= 2016 MLS expansion draft =

Player draft for MLS teams

2016 MLS Expansion Draft

General information
- Date: December 13, 2016

Overview
- Expansion teams: Atlanta United FC; Minnesota United FC
- Expansion season: 2017

The 2016 MLS Expansion Draft was a special draft for the Major League Soccer expansion teams Atlanta United FC and Minnesota United FC. Atlanta United was selected to pick first by an "Expansion Priority Draft" conducted on October 16, 2016. Protected rosters are based on an MLS release from December 12, 2016.

== Format ==
These are the rules for the 2016 MLS Expansion Draft as laid out by Major League Soccer.

- Existing teams are allowed to protect 11 players from their Senior, Supplemental and Reserve Roster. Generation Adidas players and Homegrown Players on supplemental rosters are automatically protected and exempt from the expansion draft. Though players who graduated from the Generation Adidas program to the senior roster at the end of the 2016 season are not exempt.
- Only one player may be claimed from each club's non-protected roster, that team is then eliminated from the expansion draft and not allowed to lose any further players
- The expansion draft will last 5 rounds totaling 10 players to be drafted.

== Expansion Draft order ==
Pick	MLS Team	Player	Previous Team	Trade Notes
1	Atlanta United FC	Donny Toia	Montreal Impact	Traded to Orlando City SC on December 13, 2016.
2	Minnesota United FC	Chris Duvall	New York Red Bulls	Traded to Montreal Impact on December 13, 2016.
3	Atlanta United FC	Zach Loyd	FC Dallas	
4	Minnesota United FC	Collen Warner	Houston Dynamo	
5	Atlanta United FC	Clint Irwin	Toronto FC	Traded back to Toronto FC on December 13, 2016.
6	Minnesota United FC	Mohammed Saeid	Columbus Crew SC	Traded to Colorado Rapids on March 31, 2017.
7	Atlanta United FC	Mikey Ambrose	Orlando City SC	
8	Minnesota United FC	Jeff Attinella	Real Salt Lake	Traded to Portland Timbers on December 20, 2016.
9	Atlanta United FC	Alec Kann	Sporting Kansas City	
10	Minnesota United FC	Femi Hollinger-Janzen	New England Revolution	Traded back to New England Revolution on February 15, 2017.

== Affected Post-Draft Trades ==
- Minnesota United FC traded Chris Duvall to Montreal Impact for Johan Venegas and allocation money.
- Atlanta United FC traded Donny Toia to Orlando City SC for the #8 pick in the 2017 MLS SuperDraft.
- Atlanta United FC returned Clint Irwin to Toronto FC for Mark Bloom and allocation money.
- Minnesota United FC traded Jeff Attinella to Portland Timbers FC for their natural Second Round Pick in the 2018 MLS SuperDraft and the MLS Rights to Miguel Ibarra.
- Minnesota United FC returned Femi Hollinger-Janzen to the New England Revolution for Bobby Shuttleworth.
- Minnesota United FC traded Saeid to Colorado Rapids.

== Team-by-team-breakdown ==
Legend
Selected by Atlanta
Selected by Minnesota United FC

=== Chicago Fire ===
As of December 12, 2016

Exposed	Protected	Exempt
David Arshakyan (INTL)	David Accam (DP)	Joey Calistri (HGP)
Răzvan Cociș	Arturo Álvarez	Drew Conner (HGP)
Eric Gehrig	Jonathan Campbell	Patrick Doody (HGP)
Michael Harrington	Michael de Leeuw (INTL)	Collin Fernandez (HGP)
Nick LaBrocca	John Goossens (INTL)	
Patrick McLain	Johan Kappelhof (INTL)	
Alex Morrell	Matt Lampson	
Rodrigo Ramos (On loan from Coritiba) (INTL)	João Meira (INTL)	
Michael Stephens	Matt Polster	
Khaly Thiam (On loan from MTK Budapest) (INTL)	Luis Solignac	
	Brandon Vincent	

=== Colorado Rapids ===
As of December 12, 2016

Exposed	Protected	Exempt
John Berner	Micheal Azira	Caleb Calvert (HGP)
Marc Burch	Dominique Badji (INTL)	Zach Pfeffer (HGP)
Bobby Burling	Sam Cronin	Dillon Serna (HGP)
Dennis Castillo (INTL)	Kevin Doyle (DP) (INTL)	
Conor Doyle	Shkëlzen Gashi (DP) (INTL)	
Jermaine Jones	Marlon Hairston	
Sébastien Le Toux	Tim Howard (DP)	
Marco Pappa	Zac MacMath	
Juan Ramírez (INTL)	Eric Miller	
Sean St Ledger (INTL)	Dillon Powers	
Jared Watts	Axel Sjöberg (INTL)	
Mekeil Williams (INTL)		

=== Columbus Crew SC ===
As of December 12, 2016

Exposed	Protected	Exempt
Corey Ashe	Harrison Afful (INTL)	Chad Barson (HGP)
Steve Clark	Ethan Finlay	Ben Swanson (HGP)
Dilly Duka	Federico Higuaín (DP)	
Waylon Francis	Adam Jahn	
Marshall Hollingsworth	Hector Jiménez	
Cedrick Mabwati (INTL)	Ola Kamara (INTL)	
Cristian Martínez (On loan from Chorrillo F.C.) (INTL)	Justin Meram	
Matt Pacifici	Nicolai Næss (INTL)	
Mohammed Saeid (INTL)	Zack Steffen	
Rodrigo Saravia (INTL)	Tony Tchani	
Gastón Sauro (INTL)	Wil Trapp (HGP)	
Brad Stuver		
Tyson Wahl		

=== D.C. United ===
As of December 12, 2016

Exposed	Protected	Exempt
Bobby Boswell	Luciano Acosta (on loan from Boca Juniors) (INTL)	Julian Büscher (GA) (INTL)
Andrew Dykstra	Steve Birnbaum	Chris Durkin (HGP)
Sean Franklin	Nick DeLeon	Collin Martin (HGP)
Charlie Horton	Bill Hamid (HGP)	Jalen Robinson (HGP)
Jared Jeffrey	Taylor Kemp	
Alhaji Kamara (INTL)	Patrick Mullins	
Chris Korb	Lamar Neagle	
Luke Mishu	Patrick Nyarko	
Kofi Opare	Lloyd Sam	
Chris Rolfe	Marcelo Sarvas	
Alvaro Saborio	Rob Vincent	
Travis Worra		

=== FC Dallas ===
As of December 12, 2016

Exposed	Protected	Exempt
Colin Bonner	Kellyn Acosta (HGP)	Fabián Castillo (DP)
Aubrey David (on loan from Saprissa) (INTL)	Tesho Akindele	Coy Craft (HGP)
Getterson (on loan from J. Malucelli) (INTL)	Michael Barrios (INTL)	Jesse Gonzalez (HGP)
Atiba Harris	Mauro Díaz (DP)	Aaron Guillen (HGP)
Ryan Herman	Maynor Figueroa (INTL)	Paxton Pomykal (HGP)
Moises Hernandez	Carlos Gruezo (DP) (INTL)	
Carlos Lizarazo (on loan from Cruz Azul) (INTL)	Matt Hedges	
Zach Loyd	Ryan Hollingshead	
Juan Esteban Ortiz (INTL)	Victor Ulloa (HGP)	
Norberto Paparatto	Maximiliano Urruti	
Timo Pitter (INTL)	Walker Zimmerman	
Mauro Rosales		
Carlos Ruiz		
Chris Seitz		

=== Houston Dynamo ===
As of December 12, 2016

Exposed	Protected	Exempt
Agus (INTL)	Alex	Tyler Deric (HGP)
Yair Arboleda (On loan from Santa Fe) (INTL)	Eric Alexander	Sebastien Ibeagha (HGP)
DaMarcus Beasley (DP)	Jalil Anibaba	Christian Lucatero (HGP)
Calle Brown	Will Bruin	
Keyner Brown (On loan from C.S. Herediano) (INTL)	Ricardo Clark	
Kevin Garcia	José Escalante (On loan from Olimpia) (INTL)	
David Horst	Boniek García	
Rob Lovejoy	Mauro Manotas (DP) (INTL)	
Cristian Maidana (INTL)	Erick Torres (DP) (INTL)	
Abdoulie Mansally	Andrew Wenger	
Raúl Rodríguez	Joe Willis	
Zach Steinberger		
Collen Warner		
Sheanon Williams		

=== LA Galaxy ===
As of December 12, 2016

Exposed	Protected	Exempt
Miguel Aguilar (INTL)	Emmanuel Boateng (INTL)	Bradford Jamieson IV (HGP)
Landon Donovan	Ashley Cole (INTL)	Jack McBean (HGP)
Rafael Garcia	A. J. DeLaGarza	Raúl Mendiola (HGP) (INTL)
Steven Gerrard (DP) (INTL)	Clément Diop (INTL)	Oscar Sorto (HGP)
Alan Gordon	Giovani dos Santos (DP) (INTL)	Jose Villarreal (HGP)
Baggio Hušidić	Sebastian Lletget	
Robbie Keane (DP)	Robbie Rogers	
Dan Kennedy	Brian Rowe	
Jeff Larentowicz	Daniel Steres	
Ariel Lassiter	Jelle Van Damme (INTL)	
Leonardo	Gyasi Zardes (HGP)	
Mike Magee		
David Romney		

=== Montreal Impact ===
As of December 12, 2016

Exposed	Protected	Exempt
Kyle Bekker	Hernán Bernardello (INTL)	Louis Béland-Goyette (HGP)
Patrice Bernier	Evan Bush	David Choinière (HGP)
Amadou Dia	Victor Cabrera (INTL)	Maxime Crépeau (HGP)
Didier Drogba (DP) (INTL)	Hassoun Camara	Jérémy Gagnon-Laparé (HGP)
Kyle Fisher	Laurent Ciman (INTL)	Anthony Jackson-Hamel (HGP)
Eric Kronberg	Marco Donadel (INTL)	Wandrille Lefèvre (HGP)
Calum Mallace	Matteo Mancosu (On loan from Bologna) (INTL)	
Dominic Oduro	Ambroise Oyongo (INTL)	
Lucas Ontivero (On loan from Galatasaray) (DP) (INTL)	Ignacio Piatti (DP) (INTL)	
Michael Salazar	Andrés Romero	
Harry Shipp	Johan Venegas (INTL)	
Donny Toia		

=== New England Revolution ===
As of December 12, 2016

Exposed	Protected	Exempt
Darrius Barnes	Juan Agudelo	Scott Caldwell (HGP)
José Gonçalves (DP) (INTL)	Teal Bunbury	Zachary Herivaux (HGP)
Femi Hollinger-Janzen	Cody Cropper	
Brad Knighton	Diego Fagúndez	
Daigo Kobayashi	Andrew Farrell	
Jordan McCrary	Kei Kamara (DP)	
Steve Neumann	Gershon Koffie (INTL)	
Bobby Shuttleworth	Xavier Kouassi (DP) (INTL)	
Donnie Smith	Lee Nguyen	
Matt Turner	Kelyn Rowe	
Je-Vaughn Watson	Chris Tierney	
London Woodberry		

=== New York City FC ===
As of December 12, 2016

Exposed	Protected	Exempt
Connor Brandt	R. J. Allen	Jack Harrison (GA) (INTL)
Federico Bravo (on loan from Boca Juniors) (INTL)	Frederic Brillant (INTL)	
Shannon Gomez (on loan from W Connection)	Maxime Chanot (INTL)	
Jason Hernandez	Mix Diskerud	
Eirik Johansen (INTL)	Sean Johnson	
Frank Lampard (DP) (INTL)	Mikey Lopez	
Diego Martínez (INTL)	Ronald Matarrita (INTL)	
Jefferson Mena (INTL)	Thomas McNamara	
Stiven Mendoza (on loan from Corinthians) (INTL)	Andrea Pirlo (DP) (INTL)	
Andre Rawls	Khiry Shelton	
Josh Saunders	David Villa (DP) (INTL)	
Tony Taylor		
Ethan White		

=== New York Red Bulls ===
As of December 12, 2016

Exposed	Protected	Exempt
Anatole Abang (INTL)	Aurélien Collin (INTL)	Tyler Adams (HGP)
Gideon Baah (INTL)	Felipe (INTL)	Brandon Allen (HGP)
Justin Bilyeu	Mike Grella	Sean Davis (HGP)
Omer Damari (DP) (INTL)	Sacha Kljestan (DP)	Derrick Etienne (HGP)
Chris Duvall	Kemar Lawrence (INTL)	Connor Lade (HGP)
Aaron Long	Dax McCarty	Alex Muyl (HGP)
Karl Ouimette	Ryan Meara	
Damien Perrinelle (INTL)	Luis Robles	
Kyle Reynish	Daniel Royer (INTL)	
Shaun Wright-Phillips	Gonzalo Verón (DP) (INTL)	
Sal Zizzo	Bradley Wright-Phillips (INTL)	
Ronald Zubar (INTL)		

=== Orlando City SC ===
As of December 12, 2016

Exposed	Protected	Exempt
Kevin Alston	José Aja (On loan from Nacional) (INTL)	Conor Donovan (GA)
Mikey Ambrose	Joe Bendik	Richie Laryea (GA) (INTL)
Júlio Baptista (INTL)	Cristian Higuita	Tommy Redding (HGP)
Hadji Barry	Kaká (DP) (INTL)	Mason Stajduhar (HGP)
Luke Boden	Cyle Larin	Tyler Turner (HGP)
Servando Carrasco	Kevin Molino	
Earl Edwards Jr.	Antonio Nocerino (INTL)	
Devron García (INTL)	Matías Pérez García (DP) (INTL)	
Seb Hines	Rafael Ramos (INTL)	
David Mateos (INTL)	Carlos Rivas (DP)	
Pedro Ribeiro	Brek Shea	
Tony Rocha		
Bryan Róchez (DP) (INTL)		

=== Philadelphia Union ===
As of December 12, 2016

Exposed	Protected	Exempt
Tranquillo Barnetta (INTL)	Roland Alberg (INTL)	Fabian Herbers (GA) (INTL)
Brian Carroll	Eric Ayuk (INTL)	Derrick Jones (HGP)
Anderson Conceição (On loan from Tombense) (INTL)	Alejandro Bedoya (DP)	Auston Trusty (HGP)
Charlie Davies	Andre Blake	Josh Yaro (GA) (INTL)
Maurice Edu (DP)	Warren Creavalle	
Leo Fernandes	Fabinho	
Ray Gaddis	Richie Marquez	
Matt Jones (On loan from Belenenses)	Ilsinho (INTL)	
John McCarthy	Chris Pontius	
Cole Missimo	Keegan Rosenberry	
Wálter Restrepo	C. J. Sapong	
Ken Tribbett		
Taylor Washington		

=== Portland Timbers ===
As of December 12, 2016

Exposed	Protected	Exempt
Dairon Asprilla	Fanendo Adi (INTL)	Ned Grabavoy
Jack Barmby (On loan from Leicester City F.C.) (INTL)	Vytautas Andriuškevičius (INTL)	Jack Jewsbury
Nick Besler	Gbenga Arokoyo (INTL)	
Nat Borchers	Diego Chará	
Neco Brett (INTL)	Jake Gleeson	
Wade Hamilton	Darren Mattocks	
Kennedy Igboananike (INTL)	Lucas Melano (DP) (INTL)	
Chris Klute	Darlington Nagbe	
Chris Konopka	Alvas Powell	
Jack McInerney	Liam Ridgewell	
Amobi Okugo	Diego Valeri (DP)	
Taylor Peay		
Ben Polk		
Jermaine Taylor		
Steven Taylor (INTL)		
Andy Thoma		
Zarek Valentin		
Ben Zemanski		

=== Real Salt Lake ===
As of December 12, 2016

Exposed	Protected	Exempt
Jeff Attinella	Kyle Beckerman	Danilo Acosta (HGP)
Pedro Báez (INTL)	Tony Beltran	Jordan Allen (HGP)
Olmes García	Juan Manuel Martínez (DP) (INTL)	Lalo Fernandez (HGP)
Javier Morales	Aaron Maund	Justen Glad (HGP)
Boyd Okwuonu	Yura Movsisyan (DP)	Omar Holness (GA) (INTL)
Jámison Olave	Luke Mulholland	Phanuel Kavita (HGP)
Devon Sandoval	Stephen Sunday (INTL)	Sebastian Saucedo (GA)
John Stertzer	Demar Phillips (INTL)	Ricardo Velazco (HGP)
Emery Welshman (INTL)	Joao Plata (DP)	
Chris Wingert	Nick Rimando	
	Chris Schuler	

=== San Jose Earthquakes ===
As of December 12, 2016

Exposed	Protected	Exempt
Quincy Amarikwa	Fatai Alashe	Andrew Tarbell (GA)
Leandro Barrera (INTL)	Víctor Bernárdez	Tommy Thompson (HGP)
Chad Barrett	David Bingham	
Kip Colvey	Cordell Cato	
Innocent Emeghara (DP) (INTL)	Darwin Cerén	
Shaun Francis	Simon Dawkins (DP) (INTL)	
Henok Goitom (INTL)	Anibal Godoy (INTL)	
Clarence Goodson	Andrés Imperiale (INTL)	
Steven Lenhart	Shea Salinas	
Bryan Meredith	Kofi Sarkodie	
Marc Pelosi	Chris Wondolowski	
Alberto Quintero (INTL)		
Mark Sherrod		
Matheus Silva (INTL)		
Jordan Stewart		
Marvell Wynne		

=== Seattle Sounders FC ===
As of December 12, 2016

Exposed	Protected	Exempt
Oalex Anderson (INTL)	Tony Alfaro	Darwin Jones (HGP)
Michael Farfan	Osvaldo Alonso	Aaron Kovar (HGP)
Álvaro Fernández (INTL)	Clint Dempsey (DP)	Victor Mansaray (HGP)
Oniel Fisher (INTL)	Brad Evans	Jordan Morris (HGP)
Erik Friberg (INTL)	Stefan Frei	Zach Scott
Herculez Gomez	Joevin Jones (INTL)	
Andreas Ivanschitz (INTL)	Nicolás Lodeiro (DP) (INTL)	
Damion Lowe	Chad Marshall	
Charlie Lyon	Tyler Miller	
Tyrone Mears	Cristian Roldan	
Jimmy Ockford	Román Torres (INTL)	
Dylan Remick		
Nathan Sturgis		
Nelson Valdez (DP) (INTL)		

=== Sporting Kansas City ===
As of December 12, 2016

Exposed	Protected	Exempt
Ever Alvarado (INTL)	Saad Abdul-Salaam	Kevin Ellis (HGP)
Emmanuel Appiah	Matt Besler	Jon Kempin (HGP)
Nuno André Coelho (INTL)	Dom Dwyer	Erik Palmer-Brown (HGP)
Brad Davis	Roger Espinoza (DP)	Dániel Sallói (HGP) (INTL)
Connor Hallisey	Benny Feilhaber	Paulo Nagamura
Benji Joya	Jimmy Medranda (INTL)	
Alec Kann	Tim Melia	
Justin Mapp	Soni Mustivar (INTL)	
Chance Myers	Ike Opara	
Lawrence Olum	Diego Rubio (DP) (INTL)	
Jacob Peterson	Graham Zusi (DP)	
Cameron Porter		
Seth Sinovic		

=== Toronto FC ===
As of December 12, 2016

Exposed	Protected	Exempt
Molham Babouli (HGP)	Jozy Altidore (DP)	Alex Bono (GA)
Steven Beitashour	Michael Bradley (DP)	Jay Champan (HGP)
Mark Bloom	Armando Cooper (INTL)	Jordan Hamilton (HGP)
Benoît Cheyrou (INTL)	Marco Delgado	Chris Mannella (HGP)
Clint Irwin	Tsubasa Endoh (INTL)	Ashtone Morgan (HGP)
Will Johnson	Sebastian Giovinco (DP) (INTL)	Quillan Roberts (HGP)
Daniel Lovitz	Nick Hagglund	
Tosaint Ricketts	Drew Moor	
Clément Simonin (INTL)	Justin Morrow	
Josh Williams	Jonathan Osorio	
	Eriq Zavaleta	

=== Vancouver Whitecaps FC ===
As of December 12, 2016

Exposed	Protected	Exempt
Fraser Aird	Christian Bolaños (INTL)	Sam Adekugbe (HGP)
Giles Barnes	Christian Dean	Marco Bustos (HGP)
Marcel De Jong	Jordan Harvey	Marco Carducci (HGP)
David Edgar	Erik Hurtado	Alphonso Davies (HGP)
Deybi Flores (INTL)	Andrew Jacobson	Kianz Froese (HGP)
Masato Kudo (INTL)	Matías Laba (DP) (INTL)	Ben McKendry (HGP)
Brett Levis	Kekuta Manneh	Russell Teibert (HGP)
Pedro Morales (DP) (INTL)	Nicolás Mezquida (INTL)	
Blas Pérez	David Ousted (INTL)	
Cole Seiler	Tim Parker	
Jordan Smith (INTL)	Kendall Waston (INTL)	
Cristian Techera (INTL)		
Paolo Tornaghi		
