= 2016 FC Dallas season =

FC Dallas
2016 season
- Owner: Clark Hunt
- Head coach: Óscar Pareja
- Stadium: Toyota Stadium
- MLS: Conference: 1st Overall: 1st
- CONCACAF Champions League: Semifinals
- MLS Cup Playoffs: Conference Semifinals
- Supporters' Shield: Champions
- U.S. Open Cup: Champions
- Texas Derby: Runners-up
- Brimstone Cup: Champions
- Pioneer Cup: Runners-up
- Top goalscorer: League: Maximiliano Urruti (10); All: Maximiliano Urruti (13)
- Highest home attendance: 16,612 (September 13 vs. New England Revolution); U.S. Open Cup Final
- Lowest home attendance: 10,381 (May 11 vs. Portland Timbers)
- Average home league attendance: Regular Season: 14,094; Playoffs: 14,878
Primary colors	Secondary colors

The 2016 FC Dallas season was the club's 21st season in existence in Major League Soccer (MLS), the top tier of the United States soccer league system. The club played its home games at Toyota Stadium for the 12th straight year.

The 2016 season was FC Dallas' most successful season ever. They achieved the double by winning both the Supporters' Shield for posting the best regular season record and the U.S. Open Cup, the nation's domestic cup competition. It marked the first time since 2014 where a club earned the double, and Dallas became the last of either the original MLS teams in 1996 or the existing teams founded before 2005 to win any major trophies. The Hoops fell short of winning the treble by being eliminated in the conference semifinals of the 2016 MLS Cup Playoffs, losing 2–4 on aggregate to the Seattle Sounders FC. Individually, head coach Óscar Pareja was named MLS Coach of the Year, Matt Hedges was named Defender of the Year, and Mauro Díaz and Hedges were named to the MLS Best XI.

In addition to winning the Shield, winning the Open Cup and participating in the MLS Cup Playoffs, Dallas also played in the group stages of the 2016–17 CONCACAF Champions League, where they managed to win their group. This allowed Dallas to qualify for the knockout rounds of a CONCACAF competition for the first time in their club history. The knockout rounds of the competition will be played during the 2017 FC Dallas season.

== Transfers ==
=== In ===
Date	Player	Pos	Previous club	Fee/notes	Ref
January 5, 2016	(United States) Aaron Guillen	DF	(United States) Florida Gulf Coast University	Signed on a homegrown player contract	
January 20, 2016	(Colombia) Juan Esteban Ortiz	MF	(Colombia) Atlético Huila	Undisclosed	
January 23, 2016	(Ecuador) Carlos Gruezo	MF	(Germany) VfB Stuttgart	Undisclosed	
January 26, 2016	(Honduras) Maynor Figueroa	DF	(United States) Colorado Rapids	Acquired from Colorado Rapids in exchange for General Allocation Money	
February 15, 2016	(Argentina) Mauro Rosales	MF	(Canada) Vancouver Whitecaps FC	Acquired in trade with Vancouver Whitecaps FC in exchange for Blas Pérez	
February 29, 2016	(United States) Ryan Herman	GK	(United States) University of Washington	Selected as the 17th pick of 2016 MLS SuperDraft; signed on February 29, 2016	
February 29, 2016	(Germany) Timo Pitter	MF	(United States) Creighton University	Selected as the 33rd pick of 2016 MLS SuperDraft; signed on February 29, 2016	
March 2, 2016	(United States) Colin Bonner	FW	(United States) University of North Carolina at Wilmington	Selected as the 45th pick of 2016 MLS SuperDraft; signed on March 2, 2016	
May 16, 2016	(Argentina) Agustin Jara	DF	(Argentina) C.A. Colón de Santa Fé	Undisclosed	
August 2, 2016	(Argentina) Norberto Paparatto	DF	(Argentina) Atlético de Rafaela	Rights acquired in exchange for Targeted Allocation Money from Portland Timbers	
September 9, 2016	(United States) Paxton Pomykal	MF	(United States) FC Dallas Academy	Signed on a homegrown player contract	
September 15, 2016	(Guatemala) Carlos Ruiz	FW	(Guatemala) Municipal	Undisclosed	

=== Out ===
Date	Player	Pos	Destination club	Fee/notes	Ref
November 10, 2015	(Mali) Bakary Soumare	DF	Retired	Announced retirement effective end of 2015 season	
December 3, 2015	(United States) Stephen Keel	DF	N/A	Out of contract	
December 3, 2015	(Uruguay) David Texeira	FW	(Turkey) Sivasspor	2016 option declined	
December 3, 2015	(Brazil) Michel	MF	(United States) Rayo OKC	2016 option declined	
December 3, 2015	(United States) Danny Garcia	MF	(United States) San Antonio FC	2016 option declined	
December 3, 2015	(England) Otis Earle	DF	N/A	2016 option declined	
December 15, 2015	(United States) Dan Kennedy	GK	(United States) LA Galaxy	Traded to LA Galaxy in exchange for second and third round selections in the 2017 MLS SuperDraft	
January 22, 2016	(Panama) Rolando Escobar	MF	N/A	Waived	
January 22, 2016	(Argentina) Ezequiel Cirigliano	MF	(Argentina) Club Atlético River Plate	Waived	
February 16, 2016	(Panama) Blas Pérez	FW	(Canada) Vancouver Whitecaps FC	Traded to Vancouver Whitecaps FC in exchange for Mauro Rosales	
March 4, 2016	(Jamaica) Je-Vaughn Watson	MF	(United States) New England Revolution	Re-signed to new contract and traded to the New England Revolution in exchange for third-round pick in the 2017 MLS SuperDraft	
June 24, 2016	(United States) Alejandro Zendejas	MF	(Mexico) C.D. Guadalajara	Undisclosed	
August 15, 2016	(Argentina) Agustin Jara	DF	(Bolivia) The Strongest	Waived	

=== Loan in ===
Date	Player	Pos	Previous club	Fee/notes	Ref
February 12, 2016	(Colombia) Carlos Lizarazo	MF	(Mexico) Cruz Azul	Acquired on a one-year loan from Cruz Azul.	
July 4, 2016	(Trinidad and Tobago) Aubrey David	DF	(Costa Rica) Deportivo Saprissa	Acquired on loan for remainder of 2016 season	
July 9, 2016	(Brazil) Getterson	FW	(Brazil) J. Malucelli	Acquired on loan for remainder of 2016 season	

=== Loan out ===
Date	Player	Pos	Destination club	Fee/notes	Ref
April 8, 2016	(United States) Coy Craft (HGP)	MF	(United States) Oklahoma City Energy FC	On loan to USL affiliate Oklahoma City Energy FC.	
April 29, 2016	(Guatemala) Moises Hernandez (HGP)	DF	(United States) Rayo OKC	On loan to NASL side Rayo OKC for the remainder of the 2016 season.	
May 2, 2016	(United States) Colin Bonner (HGP)	FW	(United States) Oklahoma City Energy FC	On loan to USL affiliate Oklahoma City Energy FC.	
June 28, 2016	(Germany) Timo Pitter	MF	(United States) Oklahoma City Energy FC	On loan to USL affiliate Oklahoma City Energy FC.	
August 4, 2016	(Colombia) Fabián Castillo	MF	(Turkey) Trabzonspor	On loan to Turkish club Trabzonspor through the end of 2016 with an option to buy.	

=== 2015 MLS Re-Entry Draft picks ===
Stage (Round Pick)	Player	Pos	Previous club	Ref
1 (1)	(Argentina) Maximiliano Urruti	MF	Portland Timbers	
1 (21)	PASS			
2 (17)	PASS			

The first stage of the 2015 MLS Re-Entry Draft took place on December 11, 2015.
The second stage of the 2015 MLS Re-Entry Draft took place on December 17, 2015.

=== 2016 MLS SuperDraft picks ===
Round (Overall Pick)	Player	Pos	Affiliation	Ref
1 (17)	(United States) Ryan Herman	GK	University of Washington; Seattle Sounders U-23	
2 (33)	(Germany) Timo Pitter	MF	Creighton University	
3 (45)	(United States) Colin Bonner	FW	University of North Carolina at Wilmington; D.C. United U-23	
4 (78)	(United States) Jacob Speed	DF	Southern Methodist University; Des Moines Menace	

Rounds 1 and 2 of the draft were held on January 14, 2016.
Rounds 3 and 4 of the draft were held on January 19, 2016.

=== Roster ===
As of September 15, 2016. Note: Flags indicate national team as defined under FIFA eligibility rules; some limited exceptions apply. Players may hold more than one non-FIFA nationality.

No.	Pos.	Nation	Player
1	GK	MEX	Jesse Gonzalez (HGP)
2	DF	TRI	Aubrey David (on loan from Saprissa)
5	DF	ARG	Norberto Paparatto
7	MF	ECU	Carlos Gruezo (DP)
8	MF	MEX	Victor Ulloa (HGP)
9	FW	BRA	Getterson (on loan from J. Malucelli)
10	MF	ARG	Mauro Díaz (DP)
12	MF	USA	Ryan Hollingshead
13	FW	CAN	Tesho Akindele
14	DF	SKN	Atiba Harris
15	MF	GER	Timo Pitter
16	FW	USA	Coy Craft (HGP)
17	DF	USA	Zach Loyd
18	GK	USA	Chris Seitz

No.	Pos.	Nation	Player
19	MF	USA	Paxton Pomykal (HGP)
20	MF	COL	Juan Esteban Ortiz
21	MF	COL	Michael Barrios
22	FW	COL	Carlos Lizarazo (on loan from Cruz Azul)
23	MF	USA	Kellyn Acosta (HGP)
24	DF	USA	Matt Hedges
25	DF	USA	Walker Zimmerman
28	FW	USA	Colin Bonner
29	FW	GUA	Carlos Ruiz
30	GK	USA	Ryan Herman
31	DF	HON	Maynor Figueroa
33	DF	USA	Aaron Guillen (HGP)
37	FW	ARG	Maximiliano Urruti
77	MF	ARG	Mauro Rosales

== Competitions ==
=== Match results ===
Win Draw Loss Canceled

=== Preseason ===
February 4, 2016	FC Dallas	2–1	New England Revolution	Casa Grande, Arizona
11:00 a.m. CST	Pitter 24', 42'	Report	Neumann 48'

February 6, 2016	Grand Canyon University	0–4	FC Dallas	Casa Grande, Arizona
7:30 p.m. CST		Report	Pitter 17', 39', 67'; Vega 45'	Stadium: GCU Soccer Stadium

February 20, 2016	FC Dallas	4–0	Alianza F.C.	Frisco, Texas
7:30 p.m. CST	Urruti 4', 27'; Harris (yellow card) 29'; Gruezo (yellow card) 36'; Figueroa (yellow card) 57'; Díaz 61', 83'	Report	Orellana (yellow card) 49'; Valencia (yellow card) 59'	Stadium: Toyota Stadium; Referee: Nima Saghafi

February 24, 2016 Red-Blue Classic Scrimmage	FC Dallas Red	2–0	FC Dallas Blue	Frisco, Texas
	Barrios 25', 79'	Report		Stadium: Toyota Stadium

February 27, 2016	Oklahoma City Energy FC	1–2	FC Dallas	Oklahoma City, Oklahoma
7:00 p.m. CST	Byskov (yellow card) 17'; Loyd 27' (o.g.)	Report	Harris 5'; Pitter 15'; Ortiz (yellow card) 82'	Stadium: Taft Stadium; Attendance: 7,075

=== Major League Soccer ===
==== Western Conference standings ====
Western Conference

Pos	Team	Pld	W	L	T	GF	GA	GD	Pts	Qualification
1	FC Dallas	34	17	8	9	50	40	+10	60	MLS Cup Conference Semifinals
2	Colorado Rapids	34	15	6	13	39	32	+7	58	MLS Cup Conference Semifinals
3	LA Galaxy	34	12	6	16	54	39	+15	52	MLS Cup Knockout Round
4	Seattle Sounders FC	34	14	14	6	44	43	+1	48	MLS Cup Knockout Round
5	Sporting Kansas City	34	13	13	8	42	41	+1	47	MLS Cup Knockout Round

Source: MLS

==== Overall standings ====
Pos	Team	Pld	W	L	T	GF	GA	GD	Pts	Qualification
1	FC Dallas (S)	34	17	8	9	50	40	+10	60	CONCACAF Champions League
2	Colorado Rapids	34	15	6	13	39	32	+7	58	CONCACAF Champions League
3	New York Red Bulls	34	16	9	9	61	44	+17	57	CONCACAF Champions League
4	New York City FC	34	15	10	9	62	57	+5	54	
5	Toronto FC	34	14	9	11	51	39	+12	53	CONCACAF Champions League

Source: MLS
Rules for classification: 1) points; 2) total wins; 3) total goal differential; 4) total goals scored;
(S) Supporters' Shield

==== Results summary ====
Overall								Home						Away					
Pld	W	D	L	GF	GA	GD	Pts	W	D	L	GF	GA	GD	W	D	L	GF	GA	GD
34	17	9	8	50	40	+10	60	12	4	1	33	12	+21	5	5	7	17	28	−11

Last updated: October 23, 2016.
Source: Regular Season

==== Results by round ====
Round	1	2	3	4	5	6	7	8	9	10	11	12	13	14	15	16	17	18	19	20	21	22	23	24	25	26	27	28	29	30	31	32	33	34
Stadium	H	A	H	A	H	H	A	H	A	A	A	H	H	A	A	H	A	H	H	A	A	H	A	H	H	A	A	H	H	A	A	H	H	A
Result	W	L	W	W	D	D	W	W	L	L	L	W	W	W	D	D	L	W	W	W	L	W	D	W	D	L	W	W	L	D	D	W	W	D

Updated to match(es) played on October 23, 2016. Source: Regular Season
A = Away; H = Home; W = Win; D = Draw; L = Loss

==== Regular season ====
Kickoff times are in CDT (UTC-05) unless shown otherwise

March 6, 2016 1	FC Dallas	2–0	Philadelphia Union	Frisco, Texas
2:00 p.m. CST (UTC-06)	Castillo 22'; Hedges (yellow card) 71'; Urruti 79'	Report	Carroll (yellow card) 34'	Stadium: Toyota Stadium; Attendance: 14,248; Referee: Mark Geiger

March 12, 2016 2 Texas Derby	Houston Dynamo	5–0	FC Dallas	Houston, Texas
7:30 p.m. CST (UTC-06)	Horst 6'; Hedges 13' (o.g.); Clark 23'; Wenger 27' (yellow card) 34'; Rodríguez (yellow card) 32'; García (yellow card) 80'; Bruin 85'	Report	Harris (yellow card) 21'; Gruezo (yellow card) 33'; Figueroa (yellow card) 43'	Stadium: BBVA Compass Stadium; Attendance: 21,601; Referee: Jorge González

March 19, 2016 3	FC Dallas	2–0	Montreal Impact	Frisco, Texas
8:00 p.m. CDT (UTC-05)	Zimmerman (yellow card) 34'; Figueroa (yellow card) 72'; Díaz 79'; Urruti 87'	Report	Toia (yellow card) 43'	Stadium: Toyota Stadium; Attendance: 14,502; Referee: Armando Villarreal

March 26, 2016 4	D.C. United	0–3	FC Dallas	Washington D.C.
4:30 p.m. CDT (UTC-05)	Sarvas (yellow card) 37' (yellow-red card) 66'; Rolfe (yellow card) 61'	Report	Barrios 14', 28' (yellow card) 60'; Gruezo (yellow card) 30'; Urruti 52'	Stadium: RFK Stadium; Attendance: 14,201; Referee: Jose Carlos Rivero

April 2, 2016 5 Pioneer Cup	FC Dallas	1–1	Columbus Crew SC	Frisco, Texas
8:00 p.m. CDT (UTC-05)	Akindele 77'; Gruezo (yellow card) 78'; Loyd (yellow card) 80'	Report	Meram 9'	Stadium: Toyota Stadium; Attendance: 13,174; Referee: Edvin Jurisevic

April 9, 2016 6	FC Dallas	2–2	San Jose Earthquakes	Frisco, Texas
8:00 p.m. CDT (UTC-05)	Acosta (yellow card) 14'; Gruezo (yellow card) 31'; Akindele 36' (pen.); Bernárdez 62' (o.g.); Rosales (yellow card) 84'; Figueroa (yellow card) 87'	Report	Quintero 4'; Alashe (yellow card) 41'; Wondolowski 55'	Stadium: Toyota Stadium; Attendance: 13,386; Referee: Alan Kelly

April 13, 2016 7	Portland Timbers	1–3	FC Dallas	Portland, Oregon
9:30 p.m. CDT (UTC-05)	Grabavoy (yellow card) 17'; Taylor (yellow card) 40'; Jewsbury (yellow card) 58'; Mattocks 67'	Report	Barrios 4'; Gruezo (yellow card) 22'; Castillo 26'; Akindele 29' (yellow card) 68'; Zimmerman (yellow card) 33'; Harris (yellow card) 90+1'	Stadium: Providence Park; Attendance: 21,144; Referee: Juan Guzman

April 17, 2016 8	FC Dallas	2–1	Sporting Kansas City	Frisco, Texas
6:00 p.m. CDT (UTC-05)	Barrios 35'; Rosales 68'; Harris (yellow card) 90'	Report	Olum 22'	Stadium: Toyota Stadium; Attendance: 16,215; Referee: Hilario Grajeda

April 23, 2016 9	Vancouver Whitecaps FC	3–0	FC Dallas	Vancouver, British Columbia
9:30 p.m. CDT (UTC-05)	Figueroa 35' (o.g.); Harvey 63'; Rivero (yellow card) 72'; Manneh 77'; Pérez (yellow card) 80'	Report	Urruti (yellow card) 20'; Zimmerman (yellow card) 37'	Stadium: BC Place; Attendance: 22,120; Referee: Silviu Petrescu

April 29, 2016 10	New York Red Bulls	4–0	FC Dallas	Harrison, New Jersey
6:00 p.m. CDT (UTC-05)	Zubar (yellow card) 22'; Sam 37'; Kljestan 52'; Grella 71'; Felipe 83'	Report	Díaz (yellow card) 38'	Stadium: Red Bull Arena; Attendance: 18,025; Referee: Jair Marrufo

May 7, 2016 11	Toronto FC	1–0	FC Dallas	Toronto, Ontario
6:30 p.m. CDT (UTC-05)	Delgado (yellow card) 14'; Endoh 28'; Bradley (yellow card) 43'; Beitashour (yellow card) 74'; Johnson (yellow card) 87'; Altidore (yellow card) 90+6'	Report	Ulloa (yellow card) 39'	Stadium: BMO Field; Attendance: 30,025; Referee: Jorge González

May 11, 2016 12	FC Dallas	2–1	Portland Timbers	Frisco, Texas
8:00 p.m. CDT (UTC-05)	Zimmerman (yellow card) 48' (goal) 57'; Hollingshead 55'; Castillo (yellow card) 77'	Report	Valeri 3' (yellow card) 89'; Melano (yellow card) 45'	Stadium: Toyota Stadium; Attendance: 10,381; Referee: Alan Kelly

May 14, 2016 13	FC Dallas	2–0	Seattle Sounders FC	Frisco, Texas
8:00 p.m. CDT (UTC-05)	Díaz 3' (pen.); Barrios 80'	Report		Stadium: Toyota Stadium; Attendance: 14,630; Referee: Ricardo Salazar

May 21, 2016 14	New England Revolution	2–4	FC Dallas	Foxboro, Massachusetts
6:30 p.m. CDT (UTC-05)	Shuttleworth (yellow card) 3'; Agudelo 23'; Nguyen 26' (pen.)	Report	Akindele 5' (pen.), 90'; Harris 36'; Figueroa (yellow card) 43'; Castillo 70'; Ulloa (yellow card) 81'	Stadium: Gillette Stadium; Attendance: 23,472; Referee: Silviu Petrescu

May 28, 2016 15	San Jose Earthquakes	0–0	FC Dallas	San Jose, California
9:30 p.m. CDT (UTC-05)	Thompson (yellow card) 67'	Report	Hollingshead (yellow card) 53'	Stadium: Avaya Stadium; Attendance: 18,000; Referee: Juan Guzman

June 2, 2016 16 Texas Derby	FC Dallas	1–1	Houston Dynamo	Frisco, Texas
8:00 p.m. CDT (UTC-05)	Hollingshead 23' (yellow card) 67'	Report	Clark 51'	Stadium: Toyota Stadium; Attendance: 13,457; Referee: Kevin Stott

June 19, 2016 17	Sporting Kansas City	2–0	FC Dallas	Kansas City, Kansas
4:00 p.m. CDT (UTC-05)	Olum (yellow card) 28' (goal) 43'; Feilhaber 45+2'; Dwyer (yellow card) 76'; Melia (yellow card) 80'	Report		Stadium: Children's Mercy Park; Attendance: 18,927; Referee: Jorge González

June 25, 2016 18	FC Dallas	2–0	Real Salt Lake	Frisco, Texas
8:00 p.m. CDT (UTC-05)	Acosta 18'; Hedges (yellow card) 48'; Díaz (yellow card) 51'; Castillo 58'	Report	Holness (yellow card) 81'	Stadium: Toyota Stadium; Attendance: 13,128; Referee: Drew Fischer

July 4, 2016 19	FC Dallas	4–0	Orlando City SC	Frisco, Texas
8:00 p.m. CDT (UTC-05)	Zimmerman 11'; Barrios 21', (yellow card) 29'; Hedges 61'; Gruezo (yellow card) 68'; Harris (yellow card) 70'; Castillo 90+2'	Report	Redding (yellow card) 39'; Mateos (yellow card) 55'	Stadium: Toyota Stadium; Attendance: 16,195; Referee: Silviu Petrescu

July 8, 2016 20	San Jose Earthquakes	0–1	FC Dallas	San Jose, California
9:30 p.m. CDT (UTC-05)	Quintero (yellow card) 29'; Godoy (yellow card) 59'	Report	Hedges (yellow card) 31'; Urruti 51'; Díaz (yellow card) 61'; Harris (yellow card) 72'	Stadium: Avaya Stadium; Attendance: 18,000; Referee: Juan Guzman

July 13, 2016 21	Seattle Sounders FC	5–0	FC Dallas	Seattle, Washington
9:30 p.m. CDT (UTC-05)	Dempsey 6' (pen.), (red card) 33'; Ivanschitz 18'; Morris 22'; Jones 61'; Roldan 73'	Report	Figueroa (red card) 4'; Ortiz (yellow card) 33'	Stadium: CenturyLink Field; Attendance: 40,101; Referee: Ricardo Salazar

July 16, 2016 22 Brimstone Cup	FC Dallas	3–1	Chicago Fire	Frisco, Texas
8:00 p.m. CDT (UTC-05)	Urruti 23'; Díaz 41'; Rosales 90+2'	Report	Álvarez 90+1'	Stadium: Toyota Stadium; Attendance: 13,942; Referee: Baldomero Toledo

July 23, 2016 23	Colorado Rapids	1–1	FC Dallas	Commerce City, Colorado
9:00 p.m. CDT (UTC-05)	Cronin (yellow card) 24'; Hairston 44'	Report	Ulloa 82'	Stadium: Dick's Sporting Goods Park; Attendance: 18,178; Referee: Kevin Stott

July 31, 2016 24	FC Dallas	2–0	Vancouver Whitecaps FC	Frisco, Texas
6:00 p.m. CDT (UTC-05)	Acosta 56'; Urruti 59'	Report		Stadium: Toyota Stadium; Attendance: 13,824; Referee: Jair Marrufo

August 13, 2016 25	FC Dallas	2–2	Sporting Kansas City	Frisco, Texas
8:00 p.m. CDT (UTC-05)	Hedges (yellow card) 22'; Akindele 66'; Urruti 76'; Harris (yellow card) 83'	Report	Dwyer 68', 73'; Abdul-Salaam (yellow card) 86'; Medranda (yellow card) 88'	Stadium: Toyota Stadium; Attendance: 13,408; Referee: Armando Villarreal

August 20, 2016 26	Real Salt Lake	1–0	FC Dallas	Sandy, Utah
9:00 p.m. CDT (UTC-05)	Beltran (yellow card) 43'; Mulholland (yellow card) 57'; Olave 78'; Plata (yellow card) 90+5'	Report	David (yellow card) 81'; Figueroa (yellow card) 83'	Stadium: Rio Tinto Stadium; Attendance: 19,939; Referee: Jose Carlos Rivero

August 27, 2016 27 Texas Derby	Houston Dynamo	1–3	FC Dallas	Houston, Texas
8:00 p.m. CDT (UTC-05)	Alex 19'; Torres (yellow card) 90+3'	Report	Díaz 59' (pen.); Barrios 60', 79'	Stadium: BBVA Compass Stadium; Attendance: 18,769; Referee: Kevin Stott

September 3, 2016 28	FC Dallas	3–1	Portland Timbers	Frisco, Texas
8:00 p.m. CDT (UTC-05)	Díaz 14' (pen.); Ulloa 45+2'; Ortiz (yellow card) 46'; Zimmerman 53'; Hedges (yellow card) 54'; Urruti (yellow card) 59'	Report	Jewsbury (yellow card) 22'; Ridgewell (yellow card) 52'; Valeri 87'; Grabavoy (yellow card) 90+2'	Stadium: Toyota Stadium; Attendance: 14,207; Referee: Ted Unkel

September 10, 2016 29	FC Dallas	0–1	Colorado Rapids	Frisco, Texas
8:00 p.m. CDT (UTC-05)	Urruti (yellow card) 90+6'	Report	Sjoberg (yellow card) 30'; Burch (yellow card) 51'; Badji 52'; Azira (yellow card) 68'; Hairston (yellow card) 81'	Stadium: Toyota Stadium; Attendance: 14,468; Referee: Robert Sibiga

September 17, 2016 30	New York City FC	2–2	FC Dallas	New York City, New York
6:00 p.m. CDT (UTC-05)	McNamara 8'; Allen (yellow card) 14'; Shelton 78'	Report	Urruti 20'; Hollingshead (yellow card) 28'; Figueroa (yellow card) 31'; Barrios 52'; Acosta (yellow card) 73'; Gruezo (yellow card) 88'	Stadium: Yankee Stadium; Attendance: 25,204; Referee: Alan Kelly

September 24, 2016 31	Real Salt Lake	0–0	FC Dallas	Sandy, Utah
8:30 p.m. CDT (UTC-05)	Mulholland (yellow card) 39'	Report	Acosta (yellow card) 85'; Seitz (yellow card) 90+1'	Stadium: Rio Tinto Stadium; Attendance: 20,069; Referee: Jair Marrufo

October 1, 2016 32	FC Dallas	1–0	LA Galaxy	Frisco, Texas
8:00 p.m. CDT (UTC-05)	Zimmerman 39'; Acosta (yellow card) 71'; Figueroa (yellow card) 90'	Report	DeLaGarza (yellow card) 12'; Van Damme (yellow card) 87'	Stadium: Toyota Stadium; Attendance: 15,968; Referee: Drew Fischer

October 16, 2016 33	FC Dallas	2–1	Seattle Sounders FC	Frisco, Texas
4:00 p.m. CDT (UTC-05)	Gruezo (yellow card) 40'; Urruti (yellow card) 45+1' (goal) 79'; Ruiz 89'; Barrios (yellow card) 90+7'	Report	Lodeiro 41'; Mears (yellow card) 57'	Stadium: Toyota Stadium; Attendance: 14,468; Referee: Mark Geiger

October 23, 2016 34	LA Galaxy	0–0	FC Dallas	Carson, California
6:00 p.m. CDT (UTC-05)	Donovan (yellow card) 31'	Report	Akindele (yellow card) 39'; Gruezo (yellow card) 47'; Rosales (yellow card) 90+2'	Stadium: StubHub Center; Attendance: 27,167; Referee: Chris Penso

=== MLS Cup Playoffs ===
==== Western Conference Semifinals ====
October 30, 2016 Leg 1	Seattle Sounders FC	3–0	FC Dallas	Seattle, Washington
8:30 p.m. CDT (UTC-05)	Valdez 50'; Lodeiro 55', 58'	Report	Figueroa (yellow card) 85'	Stadium: CenturyLink Field; Attendance: 37,073; Referee: Ricardo Salazar

November 6, 2016 Leg 2	FC Dallas	2–1 (2–4 agg.)	Seattle Sounders FC	Frisco, Texas
8:00 p.m. CST (UTC-06)	Akindele 25'; Harris (yellow card) 27'; Urruti 56'	Report	Roldan (yellow card) 27'; Lodeiro 54'; Frei (yellow card) 67'	Stadium: Toyota Stadium; Attendance: 14,878; Referee: Hilario Grajeda

=== CONCACAF Champions League ===
Since FC Dallas were the 2015 MLS Western Conference regular season champions, the club qualified for a group stage spot in the CONCACAF Champions League. It is the second time Dallas qualified for the competition after participating in the group stage of the 2011-12 Champions League where they did not advance out of the group stage. This time, however, they won their group to advance to the knockout stage.

==== Group stage ====
Pos	Team	Pld	W	D	L	GF	GA	GD	Pts	Qualification	DAL	SUC	EST
1	(United States) FC Dallas	4	2	2	0	8	4	+4	8	Quarter-finals	—	0–0	2–1
2	(Guatemala) Suchitepéquez	4	1	2	1	4	6	−2	5		2–5	—	1–0
3	(Nicaragua) Real Estelí	4	0	2	2	3	5	−2	2		1–1	1–1	—

Source: CONCACAF

August 4, 2016	FC Dallas (United States)	2–1	(Nicaragua) Real Estelí	Frisco, Texas
8:00 p.m. CDT (UTC-05)	Barrios 44'; Figueroa 84'; Díaz (yellow card) 90+1'	Report	Berdún 48'; Torres (yellow card) 61'; Lopez (yellow card) 77'	Stadium: Toyota Stadium; Referee: (Trinidad and Tobago) Rodphin Harris

August 24, 2016	Real Estelí (Nicaragua)	1–1	(United States) FC Dallas	Estelí, Nicaragua
9:00 p.m. CDT (UTC-05)	Pinel 5'; Galeano (yellow card) 39'; Lopez (yellow card) 50'	Report	Harris 7'	Stadium: Estadio Independencia; Referee: (El Salvador) Jaime Herrera

September 28, 2016	FC Dallas (United States)	0–0	(Guatemala) C.D. Suchitepéquez	Frisco, Texas
7:00 p.m. CDT (UTC-05)	David (red card) 90+2'	Report	Escoto (yellow card) 42' (yellow-red card) 90+6'	Stadium: Toyota Stadium; Referee: (Mexico) Roberto García Orozco

October 20, 2016	C.D. Suchitepéquez (Guatemala)	2–5	(United States) FC Dallas	Guatemala City, Guatemala
7:00 p.m. CDT (UTC-05)	Akindele 6' (o.g.); E Morales (yellow card) 7'; W Morales 22'; Maltes (yellow card) 61'; Maltes (red card) 65'	Report	Gruezo 27'; Hedges 36'; Harris 51'; Gonzalez (yellow card) 56'; González 87' (o.g.); Lizarazo 90'	Stadium: Estadio Doroteo Guamuch Flores; Referee: (Panama) John Pitti

=== U.S. Open Cup ===
June 15, 2016 Fourth round	FC Dallas (Texas)	2–2 (a.e.t.) (6–5 p)	Oklahoma City Energy FC	University Park, Texas
8:00 PM CDT	Ortiz (yellow card) 34'; Lizarazo 37', 43'	Report	Rideout 26'; König (yellow card) 87'; Thomas 90'; Harris (yellow card) 105'; Andrews (yellow card) 119'	Stadium: Westcott Field; Referee: Guido Gonzalez Jr.
	Penalties
	Lizarazo (penalty scored); Acosta (penalty scored); Díaz (penalty scored); Hedges (penalty missed); Harris (penalty scored); Ortiz (penalty scored); Bonner (penalty scored)		(penalty scored) König; (penalty scored) Cuevas; (penalty scored) Thomas; (penalty missed) Wojcik; (penalty scored) Toth; (penalty scored) Andrews; (penalty missed) Hedrick

June 29, 2016 Round of 16	FC Dallas (Texas)	2–1 (a.e.t.)	Colorado Rapids	Frisco, Texas
	Jara (yellow card) 15'; Díaz 64', (yellow card) 120+3'; Zimmerman (yellow card) 90+1'; Urruti 96'; Harris (yellow card) 120+2'	Report	Watts (yellow card) 15'; Badji 38'; Williams (yellow card) 86'	Stadium: Toyota Stadium; Referee: Ismail Elfath

July 20, 2016 Quarterfinals	Houston Dynamo (Texas)	0–1	(Texas) FC Dallas	Houston, Texas
7:30 p.m. CDT (UTC-05)	Manotas (yellow card) 22'; Clark (yellow card) 71'; Mansally (yellow card) 83'	Report	Harris (yellow card) 76'; Castillo 90+1'	Stadium: BBVA Compass Stadium; Attendance: 10,150; Referee: Nima Saghafi

August 10, 2016 Semifinals	Los Angeles Galaxy (California)	1–2 (a.e.t.)	(Texas) FC Dallas	Carson, California
9:00 PM CDT (UTC-05)	Garcia (yellow card) 80'; Magee 101' (pen.)	Report	Harris (yellow card) 26'; Ulloa (yellow card) 53', (goal) 120+1'; Figueroa (yellow card) 75'; Gruezo (yellow card) 86'; Barrios (yellow card) 112'; Hedges 116'	Stadium: StubHub Center; Attendance: 6,120; Referee: Ted Unkel

September 13, 2016 Final	FC Dallas (Texas)	4–2	(Massachusetts) New England Revolution	Frisco, Texas
9:00 PM CDT (UTC-05)	Urruti 15', 61'; Hedges 40'; Díaz 45+7' (pen.); Zimmerman (yellow card) 51'	Report	Agudelo 6', 73'; Caldwell (yellow card) 29'; Woodberry (yellow card) 48'; Farrell (yellow card) 63'; Fagundez (yellow card) 66'	Stadium: Toyota Stadium; Attendance: 16,612; Referee: Baldomero Toledo

== Statistics ==
=== Appearances ===
Numbers outside parentheses denote appearances as starter.
Numbers in parentheses denote appearances as substitute.
Players with no appearances are not included in the list.

As of final match played November 6, 2016

No.	Pos.	Nat.	Name	MLS	U.S. Open Cup	CCL	Total
No.	Pos.	Nat.	Name	Apps	Apps	Apps	Apps
1	GK	MEX	Jesse Gonzalez	6	2	4	12
2	DF	TRI	Aubrey David	4(1)	1(1)	2	7(2)
5	DF	ARG	Norberto Paparatto	0	0	2	2
7	MF	ECU	Carlos Gruezo	28(1)	3	2	33(1)
8	MF	MEX	Victor Ulloa	19(14)	1(4)	2(1)	22(19)
9	FW	BRA	Getterson	2(1)	(2)	3	5(3)
10	MF	ARG	Mauro Díaz	24(3)	5	1	30(3)
11	FW	COL	Fabián Castillo	20(2)	2	0	22(2)
12	MF	USA	Ryan Hollingshead	23(8)	2(1)	3(1)	28(10)
13	FW	CAN	Tesho Akindele	16(17)	1(3)	2(2)	19(22)
14	DF	SKN	Atiba Harris	24(6)	3(1)	3	30(7)
15	MF	GER	Timo Pitter	(1)	0	(1)	(2)
16	MF	USA	Coy Craft	(2)	1	1	2(2)
17	DF	USA	Zach Loyd	10(2)	1	0	11(2)
18	GK	USA	Chris Seitz	30	3	0	33
20	MF	COL	Juan Esteban Ortiz	2(3)	2	3	7(3)
21	MF	COL	Michael Barrios	32(2)	3(1)	1(2)	36(5)
22	MF	COL	Carlos Lizarazo	2(7)	2	1(2)	5(9)
23	DF	USA	Kellyn Acosta	26(8)	4(1)	1(2)	31(11)
24	DF	USA	Matt Hedges	28	4	3	35
25	DF	USA	Walker Zimmerman	32	4	1	37
28	MF	USA	Colin Bonner	1	(1)	0	1(1)
29	FW	GUA	Carlos Ruiz	(3)	0	1	1(3)
31	DF	HON	Maynor Figueroa	30	3	3	36
33	DF	USA	Aaron Guillen	1(1)	1	2	4(1)
34	DF	ARG	Agustin Jara	(3)	2	0	2(3)
37	FW	ARG	Maximiliano Urruti	31(1)	4(1)	1	36(2)
77	MF	ARG	Mauro Rosales	5(20)	1	2(1)	8(21)

=== Goals and assists ===
As of final match played November 6, 2016

No.	Pos.	Name	MLS		U.S. Open Cup		CCL		Total	
No.	Pos.	Name	Goals	Assists	Goals	Assists	Goals	Assists	Goals	Assists
7	MF	(Ecuador) Carlos Gruezo	0	1	0	0	1	1	1	2
8	MF	(Mexico) Victor Ulloa	2	0	1	0	0	0	3	0
10	MF	(Argentina) Mauro Díaz	5	13	2	5	0	0	7	18
11	FW	(Colombia) Fabián Castillo	5	4	1	1	0	0	6	5
12	MF	(United States) Ryan Hollingshead	2	0	0	0	0	1	2	1
13	FW	(Canada) Tesho Akindele	7	4	0	0	0	0	7	4
14	DF	(Saint Kitts and Nevis) Atiba Harris	1	4	0	1	2	0	3	5
16	MF	(United States) Coy Craft	0	0	0	2	0	0	0	2
21	MF	(Colombia) Michael Barrios	9	3	0	0	1	0	10	3
22	MF	(Colombia) Carlos Lizarazo	0	0	2	0	1	0	3	0
23	MF	(United States) Kellyn Acosta	2	5	0	0	0	0	2	5
24	DF	(United States) Matt Hedges	1	0	2	0	1	0	4	0
25	DF	(United States) Walker Zimmerman	4	0	0	0	0	0	4	0
29	FW	(Guatemala) Carlos Ruiz	1	0	0	0	0	0	1	0
31	DF	(Honduras) Maynor Figueroa	0	1	0	0	1	0	1	1
37	FW	(Argentina) Maximiliano Urruti	10	4	3	0	0	1	13	5
77	MF	(Argentina) Mauro Rosales	2	4	0	0	0	2	2	6
			1	0	0	0	1	0	2	0
Total			52	43	11	9	8	5	71	57

=== Disciplinary record ===
As of final match played November 6, 2016

No.	Pos.	Name	MLS		U.S. Open Cup		CCL		Total	
No.	Pos.	Name	Booked	Sent off (straight red)	Booked	Sent off (straight red)	Booked	Sent off (straight red)	Booked	Sent off (straight red)
1	GK	(Mexico) Jesse Gonzalez	0	0	0	0	1	0	1	0
2	DF	(Trinidad and Tobago) Aubrey David	1	0	0	0	0	1	1	1
7	MF	(Ecuador) Carlos Gruezo	9	0	1	0	0	0	10	0
8	MF	(Mexico) Victor Ulloa	3	0	1	0	0	0	4	0
10	MF	(Argentina) Mauro Díaz	3	0	1	0	1	0	5	0
11	FW	(Colombia) Fabián Castillo	1	0	0	0	0	0	1	0
12	MF	(United States) Ryan Hollingshead	3	0	0	0	0	0	3	0
13	FW	(Canada) Tesho Akindele	2	0	0	0	0	0	2	0
14	DF	(Saint Kitts and Nevis) Atiba Harris	7	0	3	0	0	0	10	0
17	DF	(United States) Zach Loyd	1	0	0	0	0	0	1	0
18	GK	(United States) Chris Seitz	1	0	0	0	0	0	1	0
20	MF	(Colombia) Juan Esteban Ortiz	2	0	1	0	0	0	3	0
21	MF	(Colombia) Michael Barrios	3	0	1	0	0	0	4	0
23	MF	(United States) Kellyn Acosta	3	0	0	0	0	0	3	0
24	DF	(United States) Matt Hedges	5	0	0	0	0	0	5	0
25	DF	(United States) Walker Zimmerman	4	0	2	0	0	0	6	0
31	DF	(Honduras) Maynor Figueroa	8	1	1	0	0	0	9	1
34	DF	(Argentina) Agustin Jara	0	0	1	0	0	0	1	0
37	FW	(Argentina) Maximiliano Urruti	4	0	0	0	0	0	4	0
77	MF	(Argentina) Mauro Rosales	2	0	0	0	0	0	2	0
Total			62	1	12	0	1	1	75	2

=== Goalkeeper statistics ===
As of final match played November 6, 2016

No.	Name	Total				Major League Soccer				U.S. Open Cup				CCL			
No.	Name	MIN	GA	GAA	SV	MIN	GA	GAA	SV	MIN	GA	GAA	SV	MIN	GA	GAA	SV
1	(Mexico) Jesse Gonzalez	1139	18	1.42	25	539	11	1.84	12	240	3	1.13	7	360	4	1.00	6
18	(United States) Chris Seitz	3000	36	1.08	73	2700	33	1.10	67	300	3	0.90	6	0	0	0.00	0
12	(United States) Ryan Hollingshead	1	0	0.00	0	1	0	0.00	0	0	0	0.00	0	0	0	0.00	0
	TOTALS	4140	54	1.17	98	3240	44	1.22	79	540	6	1.00	13	360	4	1.00	6

== Kits ==
Primary	Primary Alt.	Primary Alt. 2	Secondary	Secondary Alt.

Type	Shirt	Shorts	Socks	First appearance / Info
Primary	Red / Dark Red / White hoops	Red	Red / White hoops	MLS, April 13, 2016 against Portland Timbers
Primary Alternate	Red / Dark Red / White hoops	White	Red / White hoops	MLS, March 6, 2016 against Philadelphia Union
Primary Alternate version 2	Red / Dark Red / White hoops	Blue	Red / White hoops	MLS, April 29, 2016 against New York Red Bulls
Secondary	White / Blue hoops	Blue	Blue / White hoops	MLS, March 12, 2016 against Houston Dynamo
Secondary Alternate	White / Blue hoops	White	Blue / White hoops	MLS, March 26, 2016 against D.C. United

== See also ==
- FC Dallas
- 2016 in American soccer
- 2016 Major League Soccer season
