= All-time FC Dallas roster =

This list comprises all players who have participated in at least one league match for FC Dallas (formerly known as Dallas Burn) since the team's first Major League Soccer season in 1996. Players who were on the roster but never played a first team game are not listed; players who appeared for the team in other competitions (US Open Cup, CONCACAF Champions League, etc.) but never actually made an MLS appearance are noted at the bottom of the page.

A "†" denotes players who only appeared in a single match.

== A ==
- (Honduras) Bryan Acosta
- (United States) Kellyn Acosta
- (Colombia) Abel Aguilar
- (Canada) Tesho Akindele
- (United States) Lazo Alavanja
- (United States) Eric Alexander
- (El Salvador) Arturo Álvarez
- (Mexico) Damián Álvarez
- (Colombia) Leonel Álvarez
- (United States) Hamisi Amani-Dove
- (Ghana) Eugene Ansah
- (United States) Paul Arriola
- (United States) Chad Ashton
- (Ghana) Francis Atuahene †
- (United States) Eric Avila

== B ==
- (Senegal) Dominique Badji
- (United States) Bradlee Baladez †
- (Colombia) Michael Barrios
- (United States) Brian Bates
- (United States) Matt Behncke
- (Canada) Kyle Bekker
- (Colombia) Jair Benítez
- (United States) Colin Bonner †
- (Uganda) Tenywa Bonseu
- (Brazil) Bressan
- (United States) Paul Broome
- (England) Chris Brown †
- (United States) Michael Burke
- (United States) Ray Burse
- (United States) Carl Bussey

== C ==
- (United States) Reggie Cannon
- (United States) Antonio Carrera
- (United States) Jeff Cassar
- (Colombia) Fabián Castillo
- (United States) Edwin Cerrillo
- (El Salvador) Ronald Cerritos
- (Venezuela) Carlos Cermeño
- (Honduras) Marvin Chávez
- (Argentina) Ezequiel Cirigliano
- (United States) Kenny Cooper
- (United States) D. J. Countess
- (United States) Coy Craft
- (Colombia) Daniel Cruz
- (United States) Jeff Cunningham
- (United States) Ali Curtis

== D ==
- (United States) Eric Dade
- (Ukraine) Sergi Daniv
- (Trinidad and Tobago) Aubrey David
- (Mexico) Duilio Davino
- (United States) Kyle Davies
- (United States) Brad Davis
- (Canada) Julian de Guzman
- (United States) Chad Deering
- (Ecuador) Patrickson Delgado
- (United States) Michael Dellorusso
- (Brazil) Denílson
- (Argentina) Mauro Díaz
- (United States) Mark Dodd
- (United States) Brian Dunseth

== E ==
- (United States) Ted Eck
- (Canada) Edson Edward †
- (United States) Gerell Elliott
- (United States) Kalil ElMedkhar
- (United States) Herbert Endeley
- (Brazil) Erick
- (Colombia) Andrés Escobar
- (Panama) Rolando Escobar
- (United States) Justin Evans

== F ==
- (United States) Marco Farfan
- (South Africa) Richard Farrer
- (Peru) Raúl Fernández
- (Colombia) David Ferreira
- (United States) Jesús Ferreira
- (Honduras) Maynor Figueroa
- (United States) Jorge Flores
- (Canada) Liam Fraser

== G ==
- (Cuba) Maykel Galindo
- (United States) Danny Garcia
- (United States) Scott Garlick
- (Liberia) Chris Gbandi
- (Brazil) Getterson
- (United States) Cory Gibbs
- (United States) Jimmy Glenn
- (Turks and Caicos Islands) Gavin Glinton
- (Venezuela) Luis González
- (Mexico) Jesse Gonzalez
- (United States) Omar Gonzalez
- (United States) Clarence Goodson
- (Ecuador) Ariel Graziani
- (Argentina) Hernán Grana
- (Ecuador) Carlos Gruezo
- (Brazil) Bruno Guarda
- (Mexico) Aaron Guillen
- (Netherlands) Edwin Gyasi

== H ==
- (Puerto Rico) Jeremy Hall
- (Saint Kitts and Nevis) Atiba Harris
- (United States) Kevin Hartman
- (France) Eric Hassli
- (United States) Peter Hattrup
- (United States) Jacori Hayes
- (Trinidad and Tobago) Bryan Haynes
- (United States) Matt Hedges
- (United States) Daniel Hernández
- (Guatemala) Moises Hernandez
- (Saint Vincent and the Grenadines) Ezra Hendrickson
- (Trinidad and Tobago) Shaka Hislop
- (United States) Ryan Hollingshead

== I ==
- (United States) Sebastien Ibeagha
- (United States) Zak Ibsen
- (United States) Ugo Ihemelu
- (Spain) Asier Illarramendi
- (Argentina) Ricardo Iribarren

== J ==
- (Brazil) Jackson
- (United States) Andrew Jacobson
- (Argentina) Agustin Jara
- (Argentina) Franco Jara
- (Brazil) Geovane Jesus
- (Spain) Jesús Jiménez
- (United States) George John
- (United States) Eddie Johnson
- (United States) Steve Jolley
- (United States) Gabe Jones
- (United States) Matt Jordan
- (United States) Miles Joseph
- (United States) Sam Junqua

== K ==
- (Tanzania) Bernard Kamungo
- (United States) Stephen Keel
- (United States) Dan Kennedy
- (United States) John Kerr, Jr.
- (Albania) Amet Korca
- (Ukraine) Aleksey Korol
- (United States) Jason Kreis
- (Czech Republic) Luboš Kubík

== L ==
- (United States) Garth Lagerwey
- (Mexico) Bryan Leyva
- (Colombia) Carlos Lizarazo
- (United States) Sebastian Lletget
- (United States) Zach Loyd
- (United States) Lawrence Lozzano
- (France) Peter Luccin
- (Mexico) Rubén Luna
- (Belgium) Roland Lamah

== M ==
- (Haiti) James Marcelin
- (United States) Peri Marošević
- (Mexico) Antonio Martínez
- (United States) Joey Martinez
- (Spain) José Martínez
- (United States) Jimmy Maurer
- (United States) Ty Maurin
- (Haiti) Josué Mayard
- (Brazil) Phelipe Megiolaro
- (United States) Dax McCarty
- (Brazil) Michel
- (Ecuador) Roberto Miña
- (Scotland) Adam Moffat
- (United States) Drew Moor
- (United States) Justin Moore
- (Argentina) Javier Morales
- (United States) Lee Morrison
- (Northern Ireland) Steve Morrow
- (Colombia) Santiago Mosquera
- (Colombia) José Mulato
- (United States) Richard Mulrooney
- (United States) Eddie Munjoma
- (Croatia) Petar Musa

== N ==
- (Guinea-Bissau) Nanu
- (Bulgaria) Anton Nedyalkov
- (Brazil) Adauto Neto
- (South Africa) Toni Nhleko
- (Northern Mariana Islands) Johann Noetzel †
- (United States) Nolan Norris
- (South Africa) Tsiki Ntsabaleng
- (Honduras) Ramón Núñez

== O ==
- (Colombia) Jáder Obrian
- (Republic of Ireland) Ronnie O'Brien
- (Ghana) Dominic Oduro
- (Peru) Percy Olivares
- (Czech Republic) Zdeněk Ondrášek
- (Colombia) Juan Esteban Ortiz
- (United States) Rene Ortiz

== P ==
- (Indonesia) Maarten Paes
- (Colombia) Óscar Pareja
- (United States) Heath Pearce
- (Brazil) Marquinhos Pedroso
- (Argentina) Daniel Peinado
- (United States) Ricardo Pepi
- (Colombia) Luis Perea
- (Panama) Blas Pérez
- (Colombia) Hernán Pertúz
- (Haiti) Fafà Picault
- (United States) Aaron Pitchkolan
- (Germany) Timo Pitter †
- (United States) Brandon Pollard
- (United States) Paxton Pomykal
- (United States) Tomas Pondeca
- (El Salvador) Steve Purdy
- (United States) Ed Puskarich

== Q ==
- (Argentina) Facundo Quignon
- (United States) Eric Quill
- (Ecuador) Joshué Quiñónez

== R ==
- (Mexico) Anthony Ramirez
- (United States) Kris Reaves
- (Bosnia and Herzegovina) Beni Redžić
- (Honduras) Milton Reyes
- (United States) Bobby Rhine
- (Brazil) Ricardinho
- (Argentina) Pablo Ricchetti
- (Colombia) Andrés Ricaurte
- (Venezuela) Angel Rivillo †
- (United States) Thomas Roberts
- (Brazil) André Rocha
- (Panama) Carlos Rodríguez
- (United States) Esmundo Rodriguez
- (El Salvador) Jorge Rodríguez
- (Colombia) Milton Rodríguez
- (Uruguay) Washington Rodriguez
- (Argentina) Mauro Rosales
- (Guatemala) Carlos Ruiz

== S ==
- (Argentina) Darío Sala
- (United States) Philip Salyer
- (Costa Rica) Álvaro Sánchez
- (Mexico) Hugo Sánchez
- (Mexico) Richard Sánchez
- (United States) Mark Santel
- (Brazil) Maicon Santos
- (Brazil) Thiago Santos
- (Brazil) Marcelo Saragosa
- (United States) Juan Sastoque
- (United States) Darren Sawatzky
- (Hungary) Szabolcs Schön
- (United States) Tarik Scott
- (United States) Dante Sealy
- (Trinidad and Tobago) Scott Sealy
- (United States) Chris Seitz
- (Canada) Adrian Serioux
- (United States) Brandon Servania
- (United States) Brek Shea
- (Netherlands) Victor Sikora
- (United States) Collin Smith
- (United States) Chris Snitko
- (United States) Tom Soehn
- (Argentina) Diego Soñora
- (United States) Dan Stebbins
- (United States) Jack Stewart
- (United States) Jordan Stone
- (United States) Ryan Suarez
- (United States) Temoc Suarez
- (Switzerland) Alain Sutter

== T ==
- (United States) Nkosi Tafari
- (United States) Carey Talley
- (United States) Tanner Tessmann
- (Uruguay) David Texeira
- (Honduras) Hendry Thomas
- (Jamaica) Shavar Thomas
- (United States) Abe Thompson
- (United States) Jason Thompson
- (Colombia) Juan Toja
- (United States) Jonathan Top
- (Costa Rica) Daniel Torres
- (Colombia) John Jairo Tréllez
- (Trinidad and Tobago) Mickey Trotman
- (Ghana) Ema Twumasi

== U ==
- (Mexico) Victor Ulloa
- (Germany) Mandi Urbas
- (Argentina) Maximiliano Urruti

== V ==
- (Bolivia) Joselito Vaca
- (Finland) Simo Valakari
- (Netherlands) Dave van den Bergh
- (United States) Greg Vanney
- (Venezuela) Freddy Vargas
- (Argentina) Alan Velasco
- (Brazil) Ricardo Villar

== W ==
- (United States) David Wagenfuhr
- (United States) Blake Wagner
- (Trinidad and Tobago) Nick Walker †
- (United States) Anthony Wallace
- (United States) Bobby Warshaw
- (United States) Dante Washington
- (United States) Jamie Watson †
- (Jamaica) Je-Vaughn Watson
- (United States) Wade Webber
- (United States) Andrew Wiedeman
- (United States) Chase Wileman
- (United States) Kirk Wilson
- (England) Mark Wilson
- (United States) London Woodberry

== Y ==
- (United States) Jason Yeisley
- (United States) Alex Yi

== Z ==
- (Mexico) Alex Zendejas
- (Switzerland) Reto Ziegler
- (United States) Walker Zimmerman
- (United States) Kyle Zobeck

== Sources ==
- "MLS All-Time MLS Player Register". Mlsnet.com. Major League Soccer. Archived from the original on 14 February 2009.
- "MLS Number Assignments Archive".
- "All-Time Numeric Roster".
