= 2016 U.S. Open Cup final =

2016 final of the Lamar Hunt U.S. Open Cup

- Event: 2016 U.S. Open Cup
FC Dallas	New England Revolution
MLS	MLS
4	2
- Date: September 13, 2016
- Venue: Toyota Stadium, Frisco, Texas, U.S.
- Referee: Baldomero Toledo
- Attendance: 16,612
- Weather: Clear

The 2016 Lamar Hunt U.S. Open Cup final was played on September 13, 2016, at Toyota Stadium in Frisco, Texas. The match determined the winner of the 2016 U.S. Open Cup (LHUSOC), a tournament open to amateur and professional soccer teams affiliated with the United States Soccer Federation. It was the 103rd edition of the oldest competition in United States soccer. This edition of the final was contested between FC Dallas and New England Revolution, both of Major League Soccer (MLS). The final is a rematch at the same venue of the 2007 Final, won by New England. For the second straight year, the match was broadcast in English on ESPN2 and in Spanish on Univision Deportes Network. A preceding program on ESPN2 ran late, and the game began on ESPNEWS.

Dallas secured its berth in the final by defeating Oklahoma City Energy FC, Colorado Rapids, Houston Dynamo, and LA Galaxy. New England's road to the final involved victories over Carolina RailHawks, the New York Cosmos, Philadelphia Union, and Chicago Fire. The venue for the final was determined by a draw before the semifinals. Dallas drew 3rd and New England 4th. Therefore, following the results of the semifinals, Toyota Stadium was determined to be the final's location.

Both teams were seeking to end a long drought for a major trophy by winning a second LHUSOC, the only trophy either charter MLS franchise has won. Dallas would be the team to end their drought of 19 years by winning 4–2. It was the first time in four years that the home side won the final. As winners, FC Dallas qualified for the 2018 CONCACAF Champions League.

== Road to the final ==
=== FC Dallas ===
When they were still known as the Dallas Burn, FC Dallas (FCD) won the 1997 Cup. Lamar Hunt later became the owner of the franchise, which was re-branded as FC Dallas. The team is still owned by Hunt Sports Group and is run by Lamar's sons, Clark and Dan. FC Dallas made a run to the final of both the 2005 edition and 2007 edition of The Cup. However, they lost both finals. FCD began the 2016 LHUSOC by hosting their USL affiliate Oklahoma City Energy FC and winning by penalties. In the next round, they hosted the Colorado Rapids and won in added extra time with Maxi Urruti scoring the decisive goal. In the quarterfinals, FCD won at rivals Houston Dynamo 1–0 with the goal from Fabian Castillo. Castillo would leave the club following that game to go on loan at Turkish club Trabzonspor. In the semifinals after a scoreless 90 minutes, Dallas fell behind the LA Galaxy 1–0, but would score two goals off corner kicks late in added extra time to advance to the final. Dallas defender Atiba Harris was shown a yellow card during the match which meant he was suspended for the final due to yellow card accumulation.

=== New England Revolution ===
New England Revolution have previously appeared in two US Open Cup finals, losing the 2001 Final and winning the 2007 Final against FC Dallas. The Revs' first two matches in the competition were road games at second division opponents from the NASL. First, they defeated the Carolina Railhawks 1–0 in added extra time with a goal from Zachary Herivaux. Then, they defeated the New York Cosmos 3–2. In the quarterfinals, they hosted the Philadelphia Union and won by penalties. They also hosted in the semifinals against the Chicago Fire and won 3–1.

== Match ==
The Revolution got on the scoreboard early in the match. Following a Dallas turnover, striker Juan Agudelo received the ball and was able to turn past defender Matt Hedges near the top of the penalty box. He took a shot that beat goalkeeper Chris Seitz to Seitz's right. Maxi Urruti answered for Dallas less than ten minutes later. Mauro Diaz put a ball into the box that Urruti was able to get to before former FCD defender Je-Vaughn Watson could. After taking a touch, Urruti volleyed a shot past goalkeeper Brad Knighton to Knighton's right to even the game. Late in the first half, Dallas took the lead when Hedges headed in a ball sent into the box by Diaz after New England could not fully clear a Dallas corner. The situation continued to deteriorate for the Revs as they were forced to make two substitutions due to injury. Gershon Koffie was replaced by Kei Kamara, and Watson was replaced by Chris Tierney. Just before the half ended, Hedges drew a penalty in stoppage time as the assistant referee ruled that Jose Goncalves had pulled Hedges down inside the box. Knighton guessed correctly and dove to his right, but Diaz's penalty kick had enough pace to get under Knighton's body for a 3–1 Dallas halftime advantage.

In the second half, New England pressed to try and get a goal to get back into the game. However, a Dallas counter attack led to a second goal by Urruti, who finished a breakaway following another assist by Diaz. Urruti nearly completed a hat-trick later in the game, but hit the post on one attempt and was ruled offside on another. The Revolution would get one goal back as Agudelo scored his second goal with a far side tap-in of Teal Bunbury's cross from the right side. However, Dallas did not concede any further and claimed a 4–2 victory.

=== Details ===
2016 Lamar Hunt U.S. Open Cup Final
September 13, 2016
21:00 CDT
Final

FC Dallas	4–2	New England Revolution
Urruti 15', 61'; Hedges 40'; Díaz 45+7' (pen.)	Report	Agudelo 6', 73'

Toyota Stadium, Frisco, Texas
Attendance: 16,612
Referee: Baldomero Toledo

FC Dallas	New England Revolution

GK	18	(United States) Chris Seitz
DF	12	(United States) Ryan Hollingshead
DF	25	(United States) Walker Zimmerman	(yellow card) 50'
DF	24	(United States) Matt Hedges
DF	31	(Honduras) Maynor Figueroa
MF	23	(United States) Kellyn Acosta
MF	7	(Ecuador) Carlos Gruezo
MF	77	(Argentina) Mauro Rosales		(substituted off) 58'
MF	10	(Argentina) Mauro Diaz (c)
MF	21	(Colombia) Michael Barrios		(substituted off) 82'
FW	37	(Argentina) Maximiliano Urruti		(substituted off) 90+1'
Substitutes:
GK	1	(Mexico) Jesse Gonzalez
DF	2	(Trinidad and Tobago) Aubrey David		(substituted on) 90+1'
DF	5	(Argentina) Norberto Paparatto
MF	8	(Mexico) Victor Ulloa		(substituted on) 82'
MF	13	(Canada) Tesho Akindele		(substituted on) 58'
FW	9	(Brazil) Getterson
FW	28	(United States) Colin Bonner
Manager:
Oscar Pareja

GK	18	(United States) Brad Knighton
DF	2	(United States) Andrew Farrell	(yellow card) 63'
DF	28	(United States) London Woodberry	(yellow card) 48'
DF	23	(Portugal) Jose Goncalves
DF	15	(Jamaica) Je-Vaughn Watson		(substituted off) 45+3'
MF	7	(Ghana) Gershon Koffie		(substituted off) 42'
MF	6	(United States) Scott Caldwell	(yellow card) 29'
MF	14	(Uruguay) Diego Fagundez	(yellow card) 66'
MF	11	(United States) Kelyn Rowe		(substituted off) 69'
FW	24	(United States) Lee Nguyen (c)
FW	17	(United States) Juan Agudelo
Substitutes:
GK	1	(United States) Cody Cropper
DF	8	(United States) Chris Tierney		(substituted on) 45+3'
MF	4	(United States) Steve Neumann
MF	16	(Japan) Daigo Kobayashi
MF	10	(United States) Teal Bunbury		(substituted on) 69'
FW	13	(Sierra Leone) Kei Kamara		(substituted on) 42'
FW	88	(Benin) Femi Hollinger-Janzen
Manager:
Jay Heaps

Assistant referees:
Sean Hurd
Adam Wienckowski
Fourth official:
Sorin Stoica

Match rules

- 90 minutes.
- 30 minutes of extra time if necessary.
- Penalty shoot-out if scores still level.
- Seven named substitutes, of which up to three may be used.
- Maximum five foreign players (all citizens and legal permanent residents are considered domestic, regardless of FIFA country affiliation)
