= 2016 U.S. Open Cup =

103rd edition of cup competition in American soccer

2016 Lamar Hunt U.S. Open Cup
Tournament details
- Country: United States
- Teams: 91

Final positions
- Champions: FC Dallas (2nd title)
- Runners-up: New England Revolution
- 2018 CONCACAF Champions League: FC Dallas

Tournament statistics
- Matches played: 90
- Goals scored: 254 (2.82 per match)
- Top goal scorer(s): David Accam; Edwin Borboa (5 goals each)

The 2016 Lamar Hunt U.S. Open Cup was the 103rd edition of the oldest ongoing competition in American soccer.

On September 8, 2015 the United States Soccer Federation decided to prevent professional teams that were "majority owned by a higher-level Outdoor Professional League Team" from taking part in the competition. This rule prevented several United Soccer League teams (Bethlehem Steel FC, LA Galaxy II, New York Red Bulls II, Orlando City B, Portland Timbers 2, Real Monarchs, Seattle Sounders FC 2 and Swope Park Rangers) from competing. New York Cosmos Chief Operating Officer Erik Stover stated that eligible New York Cosmos B would not enter as "the integrity of the tournament is more important". The Houston Dynamo staffed, but not owned, Rio Grande Valley FC Toros were also ruled ineligible by USSF at the request of the Dynamo. This class of teams wouldn't take part in the U.S. Open Cup again until 2019, when South Georgia Tormenta FC and their USL League Two reserve team both participated in the competition.

Major League Soccer (MLS) teams New York Red Bulls, Portland Timbers, and Seattle Sounders FC each entered their under-23 amateur sides. US Soccer announced that these MLS sides could not play their affiliated sides before the Open Cup Final. The same rule holds for the NASL's Indy Eleven and their amateur side Indy Eleven NPSL.

The cash prize amounts were the same as those in 2015, with the champion receiving $250,000 and the runner-up $60,000. Also, the team from each lower division that advanced the furthest received $15,000. The champion of the tournament also received a berth in the 2018 CONCACAF Champions League.

== Qualification ==
All United States Division I (MLS), Division II (NASL), and Division III (USL) teams qualified automatically, except teams that are majority owned by a higher-level outdoor professional league team. This rule prevented United Soccer League teams Bethlehem Steel FC, LA Galaxy II, New York Red Bulls II, Orlando City B, Portland Timbers 2, Real Monarchs, Seattle Sounders FC 2 and Swope Park Rangers from competing. New York Cosmos B (NPSL) also stated that they would not enter the competition. The Rio Grande Valley FC Toros were ruled ineligible at the request of the Houston Dynamo. The New York Athletic Club (NPSL) withdrew before the access list was announced on February 5.

Enter in First Round (Open Division)		Enter in Second Round (Third Division)	Enter in Third Round (Second Division)	Enter in Fourth Round (First Division)
USCS/USASA/USSSA; 1 team/12 teams/1 team	NPSL/PDL; 14 teams/18 teams	USL/NPSL/PDL; 17 teams/1 team/1 team	NASL; 9 teams	MLS; 17 teams
US Club Soccer: San Francisco City FC; USASA: Aromas Café FC; Boca Raton Football Club; Lansdowne Bhoys FC; L.A. Wolves FC; La Máquina FC; Motagua New Orleans; New York Pancyprian-Freedoms; Outbreak FC; NTX Rayados; San Nicolas FC; Southie FC; West Chester United; USSSA: Harpo's FC	NPSL: AFC Cleveland; Atlanta Silverbacks Reserves; CD Aguiluchos USA; Clarkstown SC Eagles; Corinthians FC of San Antonio; Detroit City FC; FC Wichita; Fredericksburg FC; Indy Eleven NPSL; Kraze United; Miami Fusion FC; Myrtle Beach Mutiny; Richmond Strikers; Sacramento Gold; PDL: Albuquerque Sol FC; Burlingame Dragons FC; Charlotte Eagles; Cincinnati Dutch Lions; Des Moines Menace; FC Tucson; GPS Portland Phoenix; Jersey Express; Long Island Rough Riders; Michigan Bucks; Mississippi Brilla; New York Red Bulls U-23; Portland Timbers U-23; Reading United; Seacoast United Phantoms; Seattle Sounders FC U-23; Ventura County Fusion; The Villages SC	USL: Arizona United SC; Charleston Battery; Charlotte Independence; Colorado Springs Switchbacks FC; FC Cincinnati; Harrisburg City Islanders; Louisville City FC; Oklahoma City Energy FC; Orange County Blues FC; Pittsburgh Riverhounds; Richmond Kickers; Rochester Rhinos; Sacramento Republic FC; Saint Louis FC; San Antonio FC; Tulsa Roughnecks FC; Wilmington Hammerheads FC^{$}; NPSL: Chattanooga FC; PDL: Kitsap Pumas^{$}	Carolina RailHawks; Fort Lauderdale Strikers^{$}; Indy Eleven; Jacksonville Armada FC; Miami FC; Minnesota United FC; New York Cosmos; Rayo OKC; Tampa Bay Rowdies	Chicago Fire; Colorado Rapids; Columbus Crew SC; D.C. United; FC Dallas ^{$$$}; Houston Dynamo; LA Galaxy; New England Revolution ^{$$}; New York City FC; New York Red Bulls; Orlando City SC; Philadelphia Union; Portland Timbers; Real Salt Lake; San Jose Earthquakes; Seattle Sounders FC; Sporting Kansas City

- $: Winner of $15,000 bonus for advancing the furthest in the competition from their respective divisions.
- $$: Winner of $60,000 for being the runner-up in the competition.
- $$$: Winner of $250,000 for winning the competition.

== Brackets ==
First round May 11
NPSL	Richmond Strikers	1
**USASA**	**Aromas Café FC**	**2***
**PDL**	**The Villages SC**	**1**
NPSL	Kraze United	0
**PDL**	**Reading United**	**2**
NPSL	Atlanta Silverbacks Reserves	0
NPSL	Fredericksburg FC	1(7)
**USASA**	**West Chester United**	**1(8)**
**USASA**	**New York Pancyprian-Freedoms**	**2**
PDL	New York Red Bulls U-23	1
NPSL	Clarkstown SC Eagles	1
**PDL**	**Jersey Express**	**2**
**PDL**	**Charlotte Eagles**	**3***
NPSL	Myrtle Beach Mutiny	2
**NPSL**	**Miami Fusion FC**	**4***
USASA	Boca Raton Football Club	1
**NPSL**	**Indiana Fire**	**1**
PDL	Cincinnati Dutch Lions	0
**USASA**	**Southie FC**	**2**
PDL	Seacoast United Phantoms	0
PDL	Long Island Rough Riders	1
**USASA**	**Lansdowne Bhoys FC**	**2**
PDL	Michigan Bucks	0(3)
**NPSL**	**Detroit City FC**	**0(4)**
**NPSL**	**AFC Cleveland**	**1**
PDL	GPS Portland Phoenix	0
**PDL**	**Mississippi Brilla**	**2**
USASA	Motagua New Orleans	0
NPSL	FC Wichita	1
**PDL**	**Des Moines Menace**	**2**
USASA	NTX Rayados	for
**NPSL**	**Corinthians FC of San Antonio**	–
**PDL**	**FC Tucson**	**3**
USASA	San Nicolas FC	0
PDL	Albuquerque Sol FC	0
**USSSA**	**Harpo's FC**	**2**
PDL	Portland Timbers U-23	0
**USASA**	**La Máquina FC**	**2**
**NPSL**	**Sacramento Gold**	**3**
PDL	Burlingame Dragons FC	1
PDL	Ventura County Fusion	for
**USASA**	**L.A. Wolves FC**	–
**PDL**	**Seattle Sounders FC U-23**	**3***
USASA	Outbreak FC	1
USCS	San Francisco City FC	0
**NPSL**	**CD Aguiluchos USA**	**3**

Second round May 18–19
**USL**	**Richmond Kickers**	**4**
USASA	Aromas Café FC	0
**USL**	**Charleston Battery**	–
PDL	The Villages SC	for
**NPSL**	**Chattanooga FC**	**0(4)**
PDL	Reading United	0(1)
USASA	West Chester United	0
**USL**	**Harrisburg City Islanders**	**2**
USASA	New York Pancyprian-Freedoms	0
**PDL**	**Jersey Express**	**1**
PDL	Charlotte Eagles	0
**USL**	**Charlotte Independence**	**2**
**USL**	**Wilmington Hammerheads FC**	**6**
NPSL	Miami Fusion FC	0
**USL**	**FC Cincinnati**	**2**
NPSL	Indiana Fire	1
**USL**	**Rochester Rhinos**	**7**
USASA	Southie FC	0
USL	Pittsburgh Riverhounds	0
**USASA**	**Lansdowne Bhoys FC**	**2**
**USL**	**Louisville City FC**	**1(3)**
NPSL	Detroit City FC	1(1)
**USL**	**Saint Louis FC**	**2**
NPSL	AFC Cleveland	0
PDL	Mississippi Brilla	0(9)
**USL**	**Oklahoma City Energy FC**	**0(10)**
**PDL**	**Des Moines Menace**	**2**
USL	Tulsa Roughnecks FC	0
**USL**	**San Antonio FC**	**3**
NPSL	Corinthians FC of San Antonio	1
PDL	FC Tucson	0
**USL**	**Arizona United SC**	**5**
**USL**	**Colorado Springs Switchbacks FC**	**1**
USSSA	Harpo's FC	0
**USASA**	**La Máquina FC**	**2**
NPSL	Sacramento Gold	0
**USASA**	**L.A. Wolves FC**	**1(4)**
USL	Orange County Blues FC	1(2)
**PDL**	**Kitsap Pumas**	**1**
PDL	Seattle Sounders FC U-23	0
**USL**	**Sacramento Republic FC**	**5**
NPSL	CD Aguiluchos USA	0

Third round June 1
**NASL**	**Fort Lauderdale Strikers**	**1(2)**
USL	Richmond Kickers	1(0)
**NASL**	**Jacksonville Armada FC**	**2***
USL	Charleston Battery	1
NPSL	Chattanooga FC	1
**USL**	**Harrisburg City Islanders**	**2**
**NASL**	**New York Cosmos**	**2**
PDL	Jersey Express	0
**NASL**	**Carolina RailHawks**	**5***
USL	Charlotte Independence	0
NASL	Miami FC	1
**USL**	**Wilmington Hammerheads FC**	**2**
**NASL**	**Tampa Bay Rowdies**	**1**
USL	FC Cincinnati	0
**USL**	**Rochester Rhinos**	**2**
USASA	Lansdowne Bhoys FC	0
**NASL**	**Indy Eleven**	**2**
USL	Louisville City FC	1
USL	Saint Louis FC	0
**NASL**	**Minnesota United FC**	**2**
NASL	Rayo OKC	1
**USL**	**Oklahoma City Energy FC**	**2***
PDL	Des Moines Menace	1
**USL**	**San Antonio FC**	**2**
USL	Arizona United SC	0
**USL**	**Colorado Springs Switchbacks FC**	**3**
**USASA**	**La Máquina FC**	**2**
USASA	L.A. Wolves FC	0
**PDL**	**Kitsap Pumas**	**3**
USL	Sacramento Republic FC	1

Host team listed first
Bold = winner
* = after extra time, ( ) = penalty shootout score

Fourth round June 14–15
**MLS**	**Portland Timbers**	**2**
MLS	San Jose Earthquakes	0
**MLS**	**LA Galaxy**	**4***
USASA	La Máquina FC	1
**MLS**	**Real Salt Lake**	**2(3)**
USL	Wilmington Hammerheads FC	2(1)
**MLS**	**Seattle Sounders FC**	**2**
PDL	Kitsap Pumas	0
**MLS**	**Houston Dynamo**	**4**
USL	San Antonio FC	0
NASL	Minnesota United FC	1
**MLS**	**Sporting Kansas City**	**2***
**MLS**	**FC Dallas**	**2(6)**
USL	Oklahoma City Energy FC	2(5)
**MLS**	**Colorado Rapids**	**1**
USL	Colorado Springs Switchbacks FC	0
MLS	New York City FC	0
**NASL**	**New York Cosmos**	**1**
NASL	Carolina RailHawks	0
**MLS**	**New England Revolution**	**1***
**MLS**	**Philadelphia Union**	**3**
USL	Harrisburg City Islanders	2
USL	Rochester Rhinos	0
**MLS**	**New York Red Bulls**	**1**
**MLS**	**Chicago Fire**	**1(4)**
NASL	Indy Eleven	1(3)
**MLS**	**Columbus Crew SC**	**4**
NASL	Tampa Bay Rowdies	0
NASL	Jacksonville Armada FC	0
**MLS**	**Orlando City SC**	**1**
MLS	D.C. United	0(3)
**NASL**	**Fort Lauderdale Strikers**	**0(4)**

Round of 16; June 28–29
MLS	Portland Timbers	0
**MLS**	**LA Galaxy**	**1**
MLS	Real Salt Lake	1(1)
**MLS**	**Seattle Sounders FC**	**1(4)**
**MLS**	**Houston Dynamo**	**3**
MLS	Sporting Kansas City	1
**MLS**	**FC Dallas**	**2***
MLS	Colorado Rapids	1
NASL	New York Cosmos	2
**MLS**	**New England Revolution**	**3**
**MLS**	**Philadelphia Union**	**2**
MLS	New York Red Bulls	1
**MLS**	**Chicago Fire**	**2**
MLS	Columbus Crew SC	1
MLS	Orlando City SC	1
**NASL**	**Fort Lauderdale Strikers**	**2***

Quarterfinals; July 20
**MLS**	**LA Galaxy**	**4**
MLS	Seattle Sounders FC	2
MLS	Houston Dynamo	0
**MLS**	**FC Dallas**	**1**
**MLS**	**New England Revolution**	**1(4)**
MLS	Philadelphia Union	1(2)
**MLS**	**Chicago Fire**	**3**
NASL	Fort Lauderdale Strikers	0

Semifinals; August 9–10
MLS	LA Galaxy	1
**MLS**	**FC Dallas**	**2***
**MLS**	**New England Revolution**	**3**
MLS	Chicago Fire	1

Final; September 13
**MLS**	**FC Dallas**	**4**
MLS	New England Revolution	2

- Host team listed first
- **Bold** winner
- * = after extra time, ( ) = penalty shootout score

== Match details ==
=== First round ===
Draw announced April 6. All times local to game site.

May 11	The Villages SC (PDL)	1–0	Kraze United (NPSL)	The Villages, Florida
5:00 PM EDT	Dias 90+2'	USSF Report; TVSC Report		Stadium: The Villages Polo Field; Referee: Alexander DeRostaing

May 11	Richmond Strikers (NPSL)	1–2 (a.e.t.)	Aromas Café FC (USASA)	Glen Allen, Virginia
5:00 PM EDT	Bates 73' (pen.)	USSF Report	Clare 47' van Yahres 105'	Stadium: Striker Park; Referee: Matthew Franz

May 11	Fredericksburg FC (NPSL)	1–1 (a.e.t.) (7–8 p)	West Chester United (USASA)	Fredericksburg, Virginia
5:30 PM EDT	Zinkam 87' (pen.)	USSF Report	Sales	Stadium: Battleground Stadium; Referee: Mark Gorak

May 11	Miami Fusion FC (NPSL)	4–1 (a.e.t.)	Boca Raton FC (USASA)	North Miami Beach, Florida
7:00 PM EDT	Santamaria 52'; Faccini 103', 110'; Marugo 107'	USSF Report	Taboada 67'	Stadium: North Miami Athletic Stadium; Referee: Andres Pfefferkorn

May 11	Indy Eleven NPSL (NPSL)	1–0	Cincinnati Dutch Lions (PDL)	Westfield, Indiana
7:00 PM EDT	Mitchell 17'	USSF Report; IND Report; CDL Report		Stadium: Grand Park Championship Field; Referee: Aaron Hernandez

May 11	Clarkstown SC Eagles (NPSL)	1–2	Jersey Express S.C. (PDL)	Hillburn, New York
7:00 PM EDT	Bardic 90+1'	USSF Report	Correa 22' (pen.), 55' (pen.)	Stadium: Torne Valley Sports Complex; Referee: Jared Simons

May 11	Charlotte Eagles (PDL)	3–2 (a.e.t.)	Myrtle Beach FC (NPSL)	Charlotte, North Carolina
7:00 PM EDT	Siaj 49', 59'; Micaletto 111' (pen.)	USSF Report	Arambula 68'; Ibarrondo 90+1'	Stadium: Charlotte Christian School; Referee: Kevin Broadley

May 11	Reading United A.C. (PDL)	2–0	Atlanta Silverbacks (NPSL)	Reading, Pennsylvania
7:00 PM EDT	Bennett 31'; Pierrot 86'	USSF Report; RUAC Report		Stadium: John Gurski Stadium at Wilson High School; Referee: Ryan Dos Reis

May 11	Michigan Bucks (PDL)	0–0 (a.e.t.) (3–4 p)	Detroit City FC (NPSL)	Rochester, Michigan
7:30 PM EDT		USSF Report; DCFC Report		Stadium: Oakland University Soccer Field; Referee: Donovan Noocha

May 11	Long Island Rough Riders (PDL)	1–2	Lansdowne Bhoys FC (USASA)	South Huntington, New York
7:30 PM EDT	Alfonso 59'	USSF Report	Oakley 7'; McGuigan 120+6' (pen.)	Stadium: St. Anthony's High School; Referee: Dave Breckner

May 11	New York Pancyprian-Freedoms (USASA)	2–1	New York Red Bulls U-23 (PDL)	Jamaica, New York
7:30 PM EDT	Reyering 51', 66'	USSF Report	Knudson 15' (pen.)	Stadium: Belson Stadium; Referee: Rosario Candela

May 11	Southie FC (USASA)	2–0	Seacoast United Phantoms (PDL)	Revere, Massachusetts
8:00 PM EDT	Sandeman 39', 59' (pen.)	USSF Report; SUP Report		Stadium: Harry Della Russo Stadium; Referee: Randall Kelley

May 11	GPS Portland Phoenix (PDL)	0–1	AFC Cleveland (NPSL)	Portland, Maine
8:00 PM EDT		USSF Report; GPS Report; CLE Report	Manfut 24'	Stadium: Deering High School; Referee: Michael Dee

May 11	Mississippi Brilla (PDL)	2–0	Motagua New Orleans (USASA)	Clinton, Mississippi
7:00 PM CDT	Cruz 28'; Flores 43'	USSF Report; MBFC Report		Stadium: Traceway Park; Referee: Leland Grant

May 11	FC Wichita (NPSL)	1–2	Des Moines Menace (PDL)	Wichita, Kansas
7:05 PM CDT	Contreras 46'	USSF Report; DSM Report	Preston 57'; Veidman 85'	Stadium: Stryker Sports Complex; Referee: Jon Freemon

May 11	Albuquerque Sol FC (PDL)	0–2	Harpo's FC (USSSA)	Albuquerque, New Mexico
6:30 PM MDT		USSF Report	Salvaggione 14'; Wheeler 33'	Stadium: St. Pius X High School; Referee: Steven Schafer

May 11	NTX Rayados (USASA)	Forfeit	Corinthians FC of San Antonio (NPSL)
		USSF Report
Note: NTX Rayados disqualified due to not currently being active in a USSF sanctioned league.

May 11	Sacramento Gold (NPSL)	3–1	Burlingame Dragons FC (PDL)	Sacramento, California
7:00 PM PDT	Pina 56', 58'; Mez 89'	USSF Report; SGFC Report	Cox 45+3'	Stadium: Capital Christian School; Referee: Turan Ozdemir

May 11	Ventura County Fusion (PDL)	Forfeit	L.A. Wolves FC (USASA)	Ventura, California
7:00 PM PDT	España 5'; Ruiz 26'	USSF Report	Chica 45'	Stadium: Ventura College Sportsplex; Referee: Reed Christy
Note: L.A. protested the result, claiming that Ventura County used a player cup-tied to Cal FC. On May 13, the protest was upheld and L.A. moved on to the next round.

May 11	San Francisco City FC (USCS)	0–3	CD Aguiluchos USA (NPSL)	San Francisco, California
7:00 PM PDT		USSF Report	Rawsley 64'; Santiago 88'; Guerra 90+1'	Stadium: Beach Chalet #4; Referee: Michael Samaan

May 11	FC Tucson (PDL)	3–0	San Nicolas FC (USASA)	Tucson, Arizona
7:30 PM MST	Papa 6'; Minh Vu 32' (pen.), 57'	USSF Report; FCT Report		Stadium: Kino North Stadium; Referee: Anthony Bersano

May 11	Portland Timbers U23s (PDL)	0–2	La Máquina FC (USASA)	Portland, Oregon
7:30 PM PDT		USSF Report; PTU23 Report	Velazquez 6'; Barboa 90+3'	Stadium: Providence Park; Referee: Farhad Dadkho

May 11	Seattle Sounders FC U-23 (PDL)	3–1 (a.e.t.)	Outbreak FC (USASA)	Bonney Lake, Washington
7:30 PM PDT	Maguraushe 42'; Olsen 115'; Apollon 120'	USSF Report; SSU23 Report	Soria 29'	Stadium: Bonney Lake High School; Referee: Jeff Arthurholtz

=== Second round ===
Draw announced April 6. All times local to game site.

May 18	FC Cincinnati (USL)	2–1	Indy Eleven NPSL (NPSL)	Cincinnati, Ohio
7:00 PM EDT	Cummings 36' (pen.); McLaughlin 61'	Report	Mitchell 39'	Stadium: Nippert Stadium; Attendance: 8,668; Referee: Aaron Mitchell

May 18	Richmond Kickers (USL)	4–0	Aromas Café FC (USASA)	Richmond, Virginia
7:00 PM EDT	Jane 2'; Roberts 25'; Grant 48'; Luiz Fernando 83'			Stadium: City Stadium; Attendance: 1,428; Referee: JT Alukonis

May 18	Charlotte Eagles (PDL)	0–2	Charlotte Independence (USL)	Charlotte, North Carolina
7:00 PM EDT		Report	Hellmann 44'; Herrera 50'	Stadium: Charlotte Christian School; Referee: Gustavo Solorio

May 18	Wilmington Hammerheads FC (USL)	6–0	Miami Fusion FC (NPSL)	Wilmington, North Carolina
7:00 PM EDT	Martz 6', 19', 32'; Moose 9'; Parker 78', 90+2'	Report		Stadium: Legion Stadium; Referee: Corson Fidler

May 18	Louisville City FC (USL)	1–1 (a.e.t.) (3–1 p)	Detroit City FC (NPSL)	Louisville, Kentucky
7:00 PM EDT	Ilić 115'	Report	Harris 104'	Stadium: Owsley B. Frazier Stadium; Referee: Brandon Artis

May 18	Rochester Rhinos (USL)	7–0	Southie FC (USASA)	Rochester, New York
7:00 PM EDT	Volesky 6' (pen.); Fortune 9'; Ugarte 27'; Samuels 42', 44'; Own goal 48'; Samuels 76'			Stadium: Rochester Rhinos Stadium; Attendance: 1,371; Referee: Stephen Montanino

May 18	Pittsburgh Riverhounds (USL)	0–2	Lansdowne Bhoys FC (USASA)	Pittsburgh, Pennsylvania
7:00 PM EDT		Report	Purcell 10'; Kavanagh 76'	Stadium: Highmark Stadium; Referee: Charles Murphy

May 18	Charleston Battery (USL)	Forfeit	The Villages SC (PDL)	Charleston, South Carolina
7:30 PM EDT	Marini 45'; Tsonis 82'		Araujo 23', 67'	Stadium: MUSC Health Stadium; Referee: David Erbacher
Note: Game was tied 2–2 after extra time, and the Villages won 4–2 in penalties. The Villages SC were disqualified from the tournament after the Battery protested their use of a player cup-tied to Boca Raton FC.

May 18	West Chester United (USASA)	0–2	Harrisburg City Islanders (USL)	West Chester, Pennsylvania
7:30 PM EDT		Report	Warshaw 13'; Bolduc 49'	Stadium: West Chester United Soccer Club; Referee: Rosario Candela

May 18	Chattanooga FC (NPSL)	0–0 (a.e.t.) (4–1 p)	Reading United AC (PDL)	Chattanooga, Tennessee
7:30 PM EDT		Report		Stadium: Finley Stadium; Attendance: 3,641; Referee: Leland Grant
	Penalties
	(penalty scored) Bywater; (penalty scored) Zeca; (penalty scored) D. Reynolds; (penalty scored) Carrier		(penalty missed) Aguilar; (penalty missed) Fountain (penalty scored)

May 18	Mississippi Brilla (PDL)	0–0 (a.e.t.) (9–10 p)	Oklahoma City Energy FC (USL)	Clinton, Mississippi
7:00 PM CDT		Report		Stadium: Traceway Park; Referee: Andrew Musashe

May 18	Saint Louis FC (USL)	2–0	AFC Cleveland (NPSL)	Fenton, Missouri
7:00 PM CDT	Hardware 22'; Roberts 77'	Report		Stadium: World Wide Technology Soccer Park; Referee: Elvis Mahmutovic

May 18	San Antonio FC (USL)	3–1	Corinthians FC of San Antonio (NPSL)	San Antonio, Texas
7:30 PM CDT	Johnson 3'; Francois 70', 74'	Report	Chapman-Page 47'	Stadium: Toyota Field; Attendance: 2,419; Referee: Luis Guardia

May 18	Des Moines Menace (PDL)	2–0	Tulsa Roughnecks FC (USL)	West Des Moines, Iowa
7:30 PM CDT	Hoek 70'; Ibisevic 82'	Report		Stadium: Valley Stadium; Referee: Robert Sorey

May 18	Colorado Springs Switchbacks FC (USL)	1–0	Harpo's FC (USSSA)	Colorado Springs, Colorado
7:00 PM MDT	Armstrong 13'	Report		Stadium: Switchbacks Stadium; Referee: Benjamin Oakley

May 18	La Máquina FC (USASA)	2–0	Sacramento Gold (NPSL)	Westminster, California
6:00 PM PDT	Barboa 70'; Pérez 79'	Report		Stadium: Boswell Field at Westminster High School; Referee: Michael Radchuk

May 18	L.A. Wolves FC (USASA)	1–1 (a.e.t.) (4–2 p)	Orange County Blues FC (USL)	Wilmington, California
8:00 PM PDT	Sanchez 72'		Howe 77'	Stadium: Phineas Banning High School; Referee: Vincent Apple-Chiarella

May 18	FC Tucson (PDL)	0–5	Arizona United SC (USL)	Tucson, Arizona
7:30 PM MST		Report	Rooney 28'; Tan 33', 68'; Bardsley 45+'; Blackwood 47'	Stadium: Kino North Stadium; Referee: Robi Hullner

May 18	Kitsap Pumas (PDL)	1–0	Seattle Sounders FC U-23 (PDL)	Bremerton, Washington
7:30 PM PDT	Castro 90'			Stadium: Silverdale Stadium; Referee: Levi Rippy

May 18	Sacramento Republic FC (USL)	5–0	CD Aguiluchos USA (NPSL)	Sacramento, California
7:30 PM PDT	Motagalvan 24'; Pridham 36'; Rodriguez 44'; Stewart 45'; Alvarez 90'	Report		Stadium: Bonney Field; Referee: Elijio Arreguin

May 19	New York Pancyprian-Freedoms (USASA)	0–1	Jersey Express S.C. (PDL)	Jamaica, New York
7:30 PM EDT			Otto 81'	Stadium: Belson Stadium; Referee: Dave Breckner

=== Third round ===
Draw announced May 12.

June 1	Fort Lauderdale Strikers (NASL)	1–1 (a.e.t.) (2–0 p)	Richmond Kickers (USL)	Pembroke Pines, Florida
11:00 AM EDT	Gonzalez 2'	Report	Imura 32'	Stadium: Broward College South Campus; Attendance: 200; Referee: Caleb Mendez
	Penalties
	Victor (penalty scored); Núñez (penalty missed); Santos (penalty missed); Moura (penalty scored)		Imura (penalty missed); Paulini (penalty missed); Yeisley (penalty missed); Nascimento (penalty missed)

June 1	Jacksonville Armada FC (NASL)	2–1 (a.e.t.)	Charleston Battery (USL)	Jacksonville, Florida
7:00 PM EDT	Otte 17'; Keita 108'	Report	Tsonis 22'	Stadium: Southern Oak Stadium; Attendance: 1,200; Referee: Kevin Terry Jr.

June 1	Rochester Rhinos (USL)	2–0	Lansdowne Bhoys FC (USASA)	Rochester, New York
7:00 PM EDT	Fortune 59'; Volesky 70'			Stadium: Rochester Rhinos Stadium; Attendance: 4,429; Referee: Jaroslaw Werel

June 1	Indy Eleven (NASL)	2–1	Louisville City FC (USL)	Indianapolis, Indiana
7:30 PM EDT	Gordon 58'; Zayed 68'	Report	Hoffman 21'	Stadium: Carroll Stadium; Attendance: 2,145; Referee: Brandon Artis

June 1	New York Cosmos (NASL)	2–0	Jersey Express S.C. (PDL)	Jamaica, New York
7:30 PM EDT	Ayoze 35'; Orozco 72'	Report		Stadium: Belson Stadium; Attendance: 984; Referee: Dave Breckner

June 1	Carolina Railhawks (NASL)	5–0 (a.e.t.)	Charlotte Independence (USL)	Cary, North Carolina
7:30 PM EDT	Schuler 92', 115'; Albadawi 96'; Shriver 99'; Orlando 109'	Report		Stadium: WakeMed Soccer Park; Attendance: 1,769; Referee: Neil Barbulescu

June 1	Chattanooga FC (NPSL)	1–2	Harrisburg City Islanders (USL)	Chattanooga, Tennessee
7:30 PM EDT	Yuhaschek 45+1'		Wheeler 71'; Wilson 82'	Stadium: Finley Stadium; Attendance: 2,595; Referee: Leland Grant

June 1	Tampa Bay Rowdies (NASL)	1–0	FC Cincinnati (USL)	St. Petersburg, Florida
7:30 PM EDT	Hristov 11'	Report		Stadium: Al Lang Stadium; Attendance: 3,455; Referee: Rubiel Vazquez

June 1	Miami FC (NASL)	1–2	Wilmington Hammerheads FC (USL)	Miami, Florida
8:00 PM EDT	Chavez 52'	Report	Michaud 2'; Moose 5'	Stadium: FIU Stadium; Attendance: 300; Referee: Guido Gonzales Jr.

June 1	Rayo OKC (NASL)	1–2 (a.e.t.)	Oklahoma City Energy FC (USL)	Yukon, Oklahoma
7:00 PM CDT	Forbes 42'	Report	Dalgaard 45'; Hyland 107'	Stadium: Miller Stadium; Attendance: 4,385; Referee: Andrew Musashe

June 1	Saint Louis FC (USL)	0–2	Minnesota United FC (NASL)	Fenton, Missouri
7:00 PM CDT		Report	Venegas 69'; Blake 90+4'	Stadium: World Wide Technology Soccer Park; Attendance: 2,358; Referee: Greg Dopka

June 1	Des Moines Menace (PDL)	1–2	San Antonio FC (USL)	Des Moines, Iowa
8:00 PM CDT	Flath 60'	Report	McBride 72'; Francois 81'	Stadium: Valley Stadium; Attendance: 1,754; Referee: Kyle Burkhardt

June 1	La Máquina FC (USASA)	2–0	L.A. Wolves FC (USASA)	Westminster, California
7:00 PM PDT	Borboa 17', 68'			Stadium: Westminster High School; Referee: Timothy Ford

June 1	Arizona United SC (USL)	0–3	Colorado Springs Switchbacks FC (USL)	Peoria, Arizona
7:30 PM MST		Report; Report	Vercollone 39', 83'; King 59'	Stadium: Peoria Sports Complex; Attendance: 1,750; Referee: Ramy Touchan

June 1	Sacramento Republic FC (USL)	1–3	Kitsap Pumas (PDL)	Sacramento, California
8:00 PM PDT	Iwasa 61'		Castro 60', 65'; Ramos 63'	Stadium: Bonney Field; Referee: Victor Rivas

=== Fourth round ===
Draw announced May 19.

June 14	Colorado Rapids (1-MLS)	1–0	Colorado Springs Switchbacks FC (3-USL)	Commerce City, Colorado
7:00 PM MDT	Serna 84'	Report		Stadium: Dick's Sporting Goods Park; Referee: Baboucarr Jallow (Washington)

June 14	Real Salt Lake (1-MLS)	2–2 (a.e.t.) (3–1 p)	Wilmington Hammerheads FC (3-USL)	Sandy, Utah
8:00 PM MDT	Plata 68'; Martínez 86'	Report	Corboz 34'; Michaud 58'	Stadium: Rio Tinto Stadium; Attendance: 17,131; Referee: Victor Rivas (California)
	Penalties
	Martínez (penalty scored); Plata (penalty scored); Morales (penalty missed); Wingert (penalty scored)		Perone (penalty missed); Corboz (penalty scored); Barnes-Homer (penalty missed); Miller (penalty missed)

June 14	Portland Timbers (1-MLS)	2–0	San Jose Earthquakes (1-MLS)	Portland, Oregon
7:30 PM PDT	Asprilla 34'; McInerney 40'			Stadium: Providence Park; Attendance: 16,834; Referee: Allen Chapman (Utah)

June 14	LA Galaxy (1-MLS)	4–1 (a.e.t.)	La Máquina FC (5-USASA)	Carson, California
7:30 PM PDT	Villarreal 15'; Romney 96'; Lletget 105' (pen.), 115'	Report	Borboa 28'	Stadium: StubHub Center; Attendance: 4,752; Referee: Ramon Hernandez (California)

June 15	Jacksonville Armada FC (2-NASL)	0–1	Orlando City SC (1-MLS)	Jacksonville, Florida
7:00 PM EDT		Report	Mateos 62'	Stadium: Southern Oak Stadium; Attendance: 2,155; Referee: Rubiel Vazquez (Florida)

June 15	Philadelphia Union (1-MLS)	3–2	Harrisburg City Islanders (3-USL)	Chester, Pennsylvania
7:00 PM EDT	Restrepo 3'; Alberg 45+1', 90+4'	Report	Foster 79'; Warshaw 90+1'	Stadium: Talen Energy Stadium; Referee: Sorin Stoica (Ohio)

June 15	Columbus Crew SC (1-MLS)	4–0	Tampa Bay Rowdies (2-NASL)	Columbus, Ohio
7:00 PM EDT	Meram 41'; Martínez 48'; Finlay 52' (pen.); Hollingsworth 65'	Report		Stadium: Jesse Owens Memorial Stadium; Attendance: 1,064; Referee: Greg Dopka (Illinois)

June 15	Rochester Rhinos (3-USL)	0–1	New York Red Bulls (1-MLS)	Rochester, New York
7:05 PM EDT			Kljestan 20' (pen.)	Stadium: Rochester Rhinos Stadium; Attendance: 3,596; Referee: Charles Murphy (Pennsylvania)

June 15	New York City FC (1-MLS)	0–1	New York Cosmos (2-NASL)	New York, New York
7:30 PM EDT		Report Report	Szetela 88'	Stadium: Coffey Field; Attendance: 4,500; Referee: Jorge Gonzalez (New York)

June 15	Carolina RailHawks (2-NASL)	0–1 (a.e.t.)	New England Revolution (1-MLS)	Cary, North Carolina
7:30 PM EDT		Report	Herivaux 103'	Stadium: WakeMed Soccer Park; Attendance: 4,147; Referee: Kevin Terry (Texas)

June 15	D.C. United (1-MLS)	0–0 (a.e.t.) (3–4 p)	Fort Lauderdale Strikers (2-NASL)	Boyds, Maryland
7:30 PM EDT				Stadium: Maryland Soccerplex; Attendance: 1,800; Referee: Matthew Kreitzer (Maryland)
	Penalties
	Büscher (penalty scored); Vincent (penalty scored); Kemp (penalty scored); Acosta (penalty missed); Jeffrey (penalty missed)		(penalty scored) Victor; (penalty missed) Maicon Santos; (penalty scored) Gabriel; (penalty scored) Núñez; (penalty scored) Matheus Carvalho

June 15	Minnesota United FC (2-NASL)	1–2 (a.e.t.)	Sporting Kansas City (1-MLS)	Blaine, Minnesota
7:00 PM CDT	Ramirez 82' (pen.)	Report	Feilhaber 65' (pen.); Rubio 109'	Stadium: National Sports Center; Attendance: 7,689; Referee: Nima Saghafi (Oklahoma)

June 15	Houston Dynamo (1-MLS)	4–0	San Antonio FC (3-USL)	Houston, Texas
7:15 PM CDT	Manotas 39'; Alex 45+5'; Rodríguez 60'; Miranda 66'	Report		Stadium: BBVA Compass Stadium; Attendance: 5,807; Referee: Leszek Stalmach (Texas)

June 15	Chicago Fire (1-MLS)	1–1 (a.e.t.) (4–3 p)	Indy Eleven (2-NASL)	Bridgeview, Illinois
7:30 PM CDT	Accam 111'	Report	Braun 105'	Stadium: Toyota Park; Attendance: 5,543; Referee: Elvis Mahmutovic (Missouri)
	Penalties
	Igboananike (penalty missed); Thiam (penalty scored); Vincent (penalty scored); LaBrocca (penalty scored); Accam (penalty scored)		Paterson (penalty scored); Zayed (penalty scored); Vuković (penalty missed); Keller (penalty missed); Ubiparipović (penalty scored)

June 15	FC Dallas (1-MLS)	2–2 (a.e.t.) (6–5 p)	Oklahoma City Energy FC (3-USL)	Dallas, Texas
7:30 PM CDT	Lizarazo 37', 43'	Report	Rideout 26'; Thomas 90'	Stadium: Westcott Field; Referee: Guido Gonzales Jr. (Georgia)
	Penalties
	Lizarazo (penalty scored); Acosta (penalty scored); Díaz (penalty scored); Hedges (penalty missed); Harris (penalty scored); Ortiz (penalty scored); Bonner (penalty scored)		König (penalty scored); Cuevas (penalty scored); Thomas (penalty scored); Wojcik (penalty missed); Tóth (penalty scored); Andrews (penalty scored); Hedrick (penalty missed)

June 15	Seattle Sounders FC (1-MLS)	2–0	Kitsap Pumas (4-PDL)	Tukwila, Washington
7:30 PM PDT	Roldan 71'; Jones 90+1'	Report		Stadium: Starfire Sports Complex; Attendance: 3,515; Referee: Chipalo Street (Washington)

=== Round of 16 ===
Draw announced June 16. The fourth round winners were drawn into four 4-team brackets based on geographic considerations.

June 28	Chicago Fire (1-MLS)	2–1	Columbus Crew SC (1-MLS)	Bridgeview, Illinois
7:30 PM CDT	Accam 7', 29'	Report	Finlay 79' (pen.)	Stadium: Toyota Park; Attendance: 6,190; Referee: Nima Saghafi (Oklahoma)

June 28	Real Salt Lake (1-MLS)	1–1 (a.e.t.) (1–4 p)	Seattle Sounders FC (1-MLS)	Sandy, Utah
8:00 PM MDT	Plata 43' (pen.)	Report	Valdez 51'	Stadium: Rio Tinto Stadium; Attendance: 17,087; Referee: Alex Chilowicz (New Jersey)
	Penalties
	Martínez (penalty scored); Plata (penalty missed); Beckerman (penalty missed)		Gomez (penalty scored); Morris (penalty scored); Scott (penalty scored); Friberg (penalty scored)

June 29	Philadelphia Union (1-MLS)	2–1	New York Red Bulls (1-MLS)	Chester, Pennsylvania
7:00 PM EDT	Pontius 55', 60'	Report	Grella 17'	Stadium: Talen Energy Stadium; Referee: Mark Kadlecik (North Carolina)

June 29	Houston Dynamo (1-MLS)	3–1	Sporting Kansas City (1-MLS)	Houston, Texas
6:00 PM CDT	Manotas 7', 84'; Alex 55'	Report	Davis 61'	Stadium: BBVA Compass Stadium; Attendance: 6,371; Referee: Allen Chapman (Utah)

June 29	New York Cosmos (2-NASL)	2–3	New England Revolution (1-MLS)	Jamaica, New York
7:30 PM EDT	Bover 38'; Guenzatti 56'		Bunbury 43', 83'; Kamara 75'	Stadium: Belson Stadium; Attendance: 1,264; Referee: Sorin Stoica (Ohio)

June 29	Orlando City SC (1-MLS)	1–2 (a.e.t.)	Fort Lauderdale Strikers (2-NASL)	Orlando, Florida
7:30 PM EDT	Molino 15'	Report	Angulo 12'; PC 120'	Stadium: Camping World Stadium; Attendance: 3,162; Referee: Caleb Mendez (Florida)

June 29	FC Dallas (1-MLS)	2–1 (a.e.t.)	Colorado Rapids (1-MLS)	Frisco, Texas
7:30 PM CDT	Díaz 64'; Urruti 96'	Report	Badji 38'	Stadium: Toyota Stadium; Referee: Ismail Elfath (Texas)

June 29	Portland Timbers (1-MLS)	0–1	LA Galaxy (1-MLS)	Portland, Oregon
7:30 PM PDT		Report	Mendiola 5'	Stadium: Providence Park; Attendance: 18,164; Referee: Edvin Jurisevic (Nebraska)

=== Quarterfinals ===
The eight round of 16 winners played the other survivor in their geographic arm of the bracket.

July 20	New England Revolution (1-MLS)	1–1 (a.e.t.) (4–2 p)	Philadelphia Union (1-MLS)	Boston, Massachusetts
7:30 PM EDT	Watson 44'	Report	Herbers 90'	Stadium: Jordan Field; Attendance: 4,000; Referee: Sorin Stoica (Ohio)
	Penalties
	Nguyen (penalty scored); Tierney (penalty scored); Caldwell (penalty missed); Gonçalves (penalty scored); Watson (penalty scored)		(penalty missed) Le Toux; (penalty scored) Ilsinho; (penalty missed) Sapong; (penalty scored) Herbers

July 20	Chicago Fire (1-MLS)	3–0	Fort Lauderdale Strikers (2-NASL)	Bridgeview, Illinois
7:30 PM CDT	Accam 5' de Leeuw 35'; Thiam 51'			Stadium: Toyota Park; Attendance: 3,666; Referee: Fotis Bazakos (Minnesota)

July 20	Houston Dynamo (1-MLS)	0–1	FC Dallas (1-MLS)	Houston, Texas
7:30 PM CDT			Castillo 90+1'	Stadium: BBVA Compass Stadium; Attendance: 10,150; Referee: Nima Saghafi (Oklahoma)

July 20	LA Galaxy (1-MLS)	4–2	Seattle Sounders FC (1-MLS)	Carson, California
7:30 PM PDT	Gordon 17' dos Santos 77'; Lletget 85', 88'		Farfan 4'; Gómez 58'	Stadium: StubHub Center; Attendance: 3,409; Referee: Alex Chilowicz (New Jersey)

=== Semifinals ===
The draw to determine the semifinal hosts for the final teams from the eastern and western halves of the bracket took place on July 21 at Soccer House in Chicago and was conducted by U.S. Open Cup Commissioner Paul Marstaller. The semifinal matches were held on August 9–10.

August 9	New England Revolution (1-MLS)	3–1	Chicago Fire (1-MLS)	Foxborough, Massachusetts
8:00 PM EDT	Kamara 16' (pen.); Watson 42'; Bunbury 85'	Report	Accam 40'	Stadium: Gillette Stadium; Attendance: 9,801; Referee: Edvin Jurisevic (Nebraska)

August 10	LA Galaxy (1-MLS)	1–2 (a.e.t.)	FC Dallas (1-MLS)	Carson, California
7:00 PM PDT	Magee 101' (pen.)	Report	Hedges 116'; Ulloa 120+1'	Stadium: StubHub Center; Attendance: 6,120; Referee: Ted Unkel (Florida)

=== Final ===
The hosting priority for the 2016 U.S. Open Cup Final took place subsequent to the semifinal host draw. The order went as follows: Chicago Fire, LA Galaxy, FC Dallas, New England Revolution.

September 13	FC Dallas (1-MLS)	4–2	New England Revolution (1-MLS)	Frisco, Texas
9:00 PM CDT	Urruti 15', 61'; Hedges 40'; Díaz 45+7' (pen.); Zimmerman (yellow card) 51'	Report	Agudelo 6', 73'; Caldwell (yellow card) 29'; Woodberry (yellow card) 48'; Farrell (yellow card) 63'; Fagundez (yellow card) 66'	Stadium: Toyota Stadium; Attendance: 16,612; Referee: Baldomero Toledo (California)

== Top Goalscorers ==
Players and teams still active in bold.

Rank	Scorer	Club	Goals
1	(Ghana) David Accam	Chicago Fire	5
1	(Mexico) Edwin Borboa	La Máquina FC	5
3	(United States) Sebastian Lletget	LA Galaxy	4
4	(Colombia) Mauro Manotas	Houston Dynamo	3
4	(Mexico) Javier Castro	Kitsap Pumas	3
4	(United States) Teal Bunbury	New England Revolution	3
4	(Jamaica) Asani Samuels	Rochester Rhinos	3
4	(Haiti) Jacques Francois	San Antonio FC	3
4	(Argentina) Maximiliano Urruti	FC Dallas	3
10	(China) Long Tan	Arizona United SC	2
10	(United States) Billy Schuler	Carolina RailHawks	2
10	(Jordan) Jaime Siaj	Charlotte Eagles	2
10	(United States) Luke Vercollone	Colorado Springs Switchbacks FC	2
10	(United States) Ethan Finlay	Columbus Crew SC	2
10	(Colombia) Carlos Lizarazo	FC Dallas	2
10	(United States) Bobby Warshaw	Harrisburg City Islanders	2
10	(Brazil) Alex Monteiro de Lima	Houston Dynamo	2
10	(Jamaica) Vincent Mitchell	Indy Eleven NPSL	2
10	(United States) Juan Correa	Jersey Express	2
10	(Republic of Ireland) Craig Purcell	Lansdowne Bhoys	2
10	(Italy) Alain Faccini	Miami Fusion FC	2
10	(Sierra Leone) Kei Kamara	New England Revolution	2
10	(Jamaica) Je-Vaughn Watson	New England Revolution	2
10	(Germany) Yannick Reyering	New York Pancyprian-Freedoms	2
10	(Suriname) Roland Alberg	Philadelphia Union	2
10	(Trinidad and Tobago) Andre Fortune II	Rochester Rhinos	2
10	(United States) Christian Volesky	Rochester Rhinos	2
10	(Ecuador) Joao Plata	Real Salt Lake	2
10	(United States) Roy Sandeman	Southie FC	2
10	(United States) Minh Vu	FC Tucson	2
10	(United States) Justin Moose	Wilmington Hammerheads FC	2
10	(United States) Kyle Parker	Wilmington Hammerheads FC	2
10	(United States) Austin Martz	Wilmington Hammerheads FC	2
10	(United States) Jeff Michaud	Wilmington Hammerheads FC	2
10	(United States) Matt Hedges	FC Dallas	2
10	(Argentina) Mauro Diaz	FC Dallas	2
10	(United States) Juan Agudelo	New England Revolution	2
