= Mandi Urbas =

German footballer

Personal information
- Full name: Hermann Urbas
- Date of birth: 18 June 1983 (age 43)
- Place of birth: Munich, West Germany
- Height: 6 ft 0 in (1.83 m)
- Position: Midfielder

Youth career
- Bayern Munich
- 1860 Munich
- SpVgg Unterhaching

Senior career*
Years	Team	Apps	(Gls)
- SpVgg Unterhaching II
2003	Dallas Burn	3	(0)
2004–2007	SpVgg Unterhaching II		
- * Club domestic league appearances and goals

Hermann "Mandi" Urbas (born 18 June 1982) is a German former professional footballer who played as a midfielder.

== Career ==
Born in Munich, Urbas began his career with Bayern Munich, moving to 1860 Munich at the age of 9. He then signed for SpVgg Unterhaching after getting in trouble with 1860 Munich's youth management. He played for the club's second team alongside American player Taylor Twellman, who helped him find an agent for a move to the United States, where he spent the 2003 season playing in Major League Soccer with the Dallas Burn, making three appearances. He left the club and returned to SpVgg Unterhaching II, combining his football career with a job as a retail salesman.

== Personal life ==
Urbas also holds American citizenship.
