= Agustin Jara =

Argentine footballer

Agustín Jara
Personal information
- Date of birth: 1 June 1992 (age 34)
- Place of birth: Corral de Bustos, Córdoba, Argentina
- Height: 5 ft 10 in (1.78 m)
- Position: Defender

Team information
- Current team: Universitario de Vinto
- Number: 34

Youth career
- Colón

Senior career*
Years	Team	Apps	(Gls)
2016	FC Dallas	3	(0)
2016–2019	The Strongest	59	(2)
2020–2024	Santamarina	64	(3)
2025–	Universitario de Vinto	22	(3)
- * Club domestic league appearances and goals as of 30 December 2025

Agustín Jara (born 1 June 1992) is an Argentine footballer who plays for Universitario de Vinto.

== Career ==
After spending time with the youth team of Colón de Santa Fe, Jara trialed with Major League Soccer side FC Dallas during their pre-season camp, eventually signing with them on May 16, 2016. He made his debut for the club on May 21, 2016, as an 88th-minute substitute during a 4–2 victory over New England Revolution. The club waived him on August 15, 2016.
