= Coy Craft =

Former FC Dallas and USMNT player

Personal information
- Date of birth: May 23, 1997 (age 29)
- Place of birth: Abingdon, Virginia, U.S.
- Height: 1.88 m (6 ft 2 in)
- Positions: Forward; attacking midfielder

Youth career
- 2011–2013: FC Dallas

Senior career*
Years	Team	Apps	(Gls)
2013–2017	FC Dallas	18	(2)
2016–2017	→ Oklahoma City Energy (loan)	16	(3)
2018	Miami FC 2	16	(0)
2018	Nyköpings BIS	11	(2)

International career^{‡}
2014	United States U18	7	(1)
2016–2017	United States U20	12	(2)
Medal record
2016 U.S Open Cup Champion
Representing United States
Winner	CONCACAF U-20 Championship	2017
- * Club domestic league appearances and goals as of January 13, 2019 ‡ National team caps and goals as of June 4, 2017

Coy Craft (born May 23, 1997) is an American former soccer player.

== Career ==
=== Youth ===
Craft joined the FC Dallas academy in 2011, where he played with the side that won five consecutive U.S. Soccer Development Academy Texas/Frontier Division titles.

=== Professional ===
Craft signed a professional Homegrown Player contract with FC Dallas on August 1, 2013. He made his debut on October 25, 2014, as an 84th-minute substitute in a 0–2 loss against Portland Timbers.

=== International ===
Craft was selected to the U.S. squad for the 2017 CONCACAF U-20 Championship. The U.S. ended up winning the tournament. Craft successfully converted his penalty kick in the penalty shootout victory over Honduras in the championship match.

== Honors ==
=== Club ===
==== FC Dallas ====
- U.S. Open Cup: 2016
- Supporters' Shield: 2016

=== International ===
United States

- CONCACAF U-20 Championship: 2017
