= Timo Pitter =

German footballer

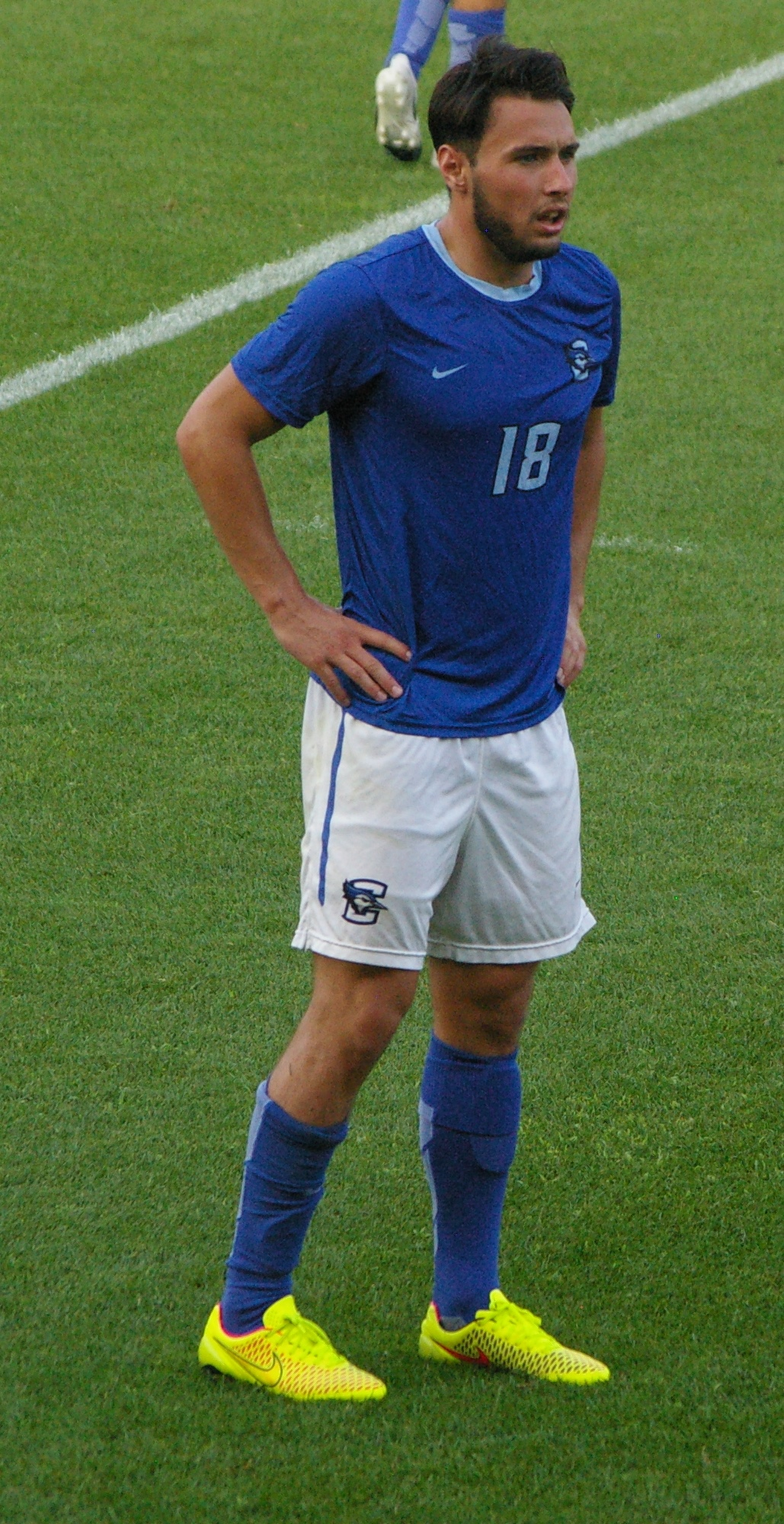
- Pitter pictured during his time at Creighton Bluejays

Personal information
- Date of birth: 1 September 1992 (age 34)
- Place of birth: Schweinfurt, Germany
- Height: 1.80 m (5 ft 11 in)
- Position: Midfielder

Team information
- Current team: TSV Aubstadt
- Number: 10

Youth career
- 2007–2010: FC Gerolzhofen

College career
Years	Team	Apps	(Gls)
2012–2015	Creighton Bluejays	89	(33)

Senior career*
Years	Team	Apps	(Gls)
2010–2012	1. FC Schweinfurt 05	52	(9)
2016	FC Dallas	1	(0)
2016	→ Oklahoma City Energy FC (loan)	11	(3)
2019–	TSV Aubstadt	191	(28)
- * Club domestic league appearances and goals as of 24 September 2026

Timo Pitter (born 1 September 1992) is a German professional footballer who plays as a midfielder for TSV Aubstadt.

== Career ==
Pitter played for over two seasons with German side 1. FC Schweinfurt 05 between 2010 and 2012, before accepting a scholarship to play college soccer at Creighton University, where he played until 2015.

On 14 January 2016, FC Dallas selected Pitter 33rd overall in the 2016 MLS SuperDraft. He made his debut on 26 March 2016 as an 81st minute substitute during a 3–0 victory over D.C. United. Pitter retired from professional soccer on 27 January 2017.
