= Mauro Díaz =

Argentine footballer

Personal information
- Full name: Mauro Alberto Díaz
- Date of birth: 10 March 1991 (age 35)
- Place of birth: Concepción del Uruguay, Argentina
- Height: 1.70 m (5 ft 7 in)
- Position: Attacking midfielder

Team information
- Current team: Universidad Católica
- Number: 28

Youth career
- River Plate

Senior career*
Years	Team	Apps	(Gls)
2008–2013	River Plate	69	(3)
2012–2013	→ Unión Española (loan)	41	(5)
2013–2018	FC Dallas	109	(23)
2018–2020	Shabab Al-Ahli	23	(5)
2020–2021	Estudiantes	18	(1)
2021–2022	Palestino	17	(2)
2023–	Universidad Católica	64	(11)

International career
2009–2010	Argentina U20	4	(0)
- * Club domestic league appearances and goals as of 20 August 2025

Mauro Alberto Díaz (born 10 March 1991) is an Argentine professional footballer who plays as an attacking midfielder for Ecuadorian Serie A club Universidad Católica.

== Early career ==
Díaz made his first team debut for River Plate on 21 September 2008 in a 3–1 away loss to San Martín de Tucumán.

== Club career ==
=== FC Dallas ===
Díaz joined Major League Soccer side FC Dallas late in 2013, quickly emerging as a talented young playmaker for the club. He scored several goals in the first few weeks of the 2014 season and earned MLS's player of the month for his exploits in March 2014. However, injuries affected him the rest of the season, and he ended up starting only nine matches. In 2015, he started 24 games and scored eight goals with ten assists as Dallas were the runners up for the Supporters' Shield and advanced to the Western Conference Finals. The next year, Díaz helped Dallas win two trophies: the 2016 Lamar Hunt U.S. Open Cup and the 2016 Supporters' Shield. However, his 2016 season ended in the penultimate game of the regular season on 16 October when he tore the Achilles tendon on his right leg. He was later named to the 2016 MLS Best XI.

=== Shabab Al-Ahli Dubai ===
On 3 July 2018, it was announced that Díaz had joined UAE Pro-League side Shabab Al-Ahli for an undisclosed transfer fee.

== Personal life ==
Díaz is the brother-in-law of both fellow Argentine footballer Ramiro Funes Mori and Mexican footballer Rogelio Funes Mori. Díaz holds a U.S. green card which qualifies him as a domestic player for MLS roster purposes.

== Honors ==
FC Dallas

- Lamar Hunt U.S. Open Cup: 2016
- Supporters' Shield: 2016

Individual

- Lamar Hunt U.S. Open Cup Player of the Tournament: 2016
- MLS Best XI: 2016
- MLS All-Star: 2016
