= Víctor Ulloa (footballer, born 1992) =

Mexican footballer

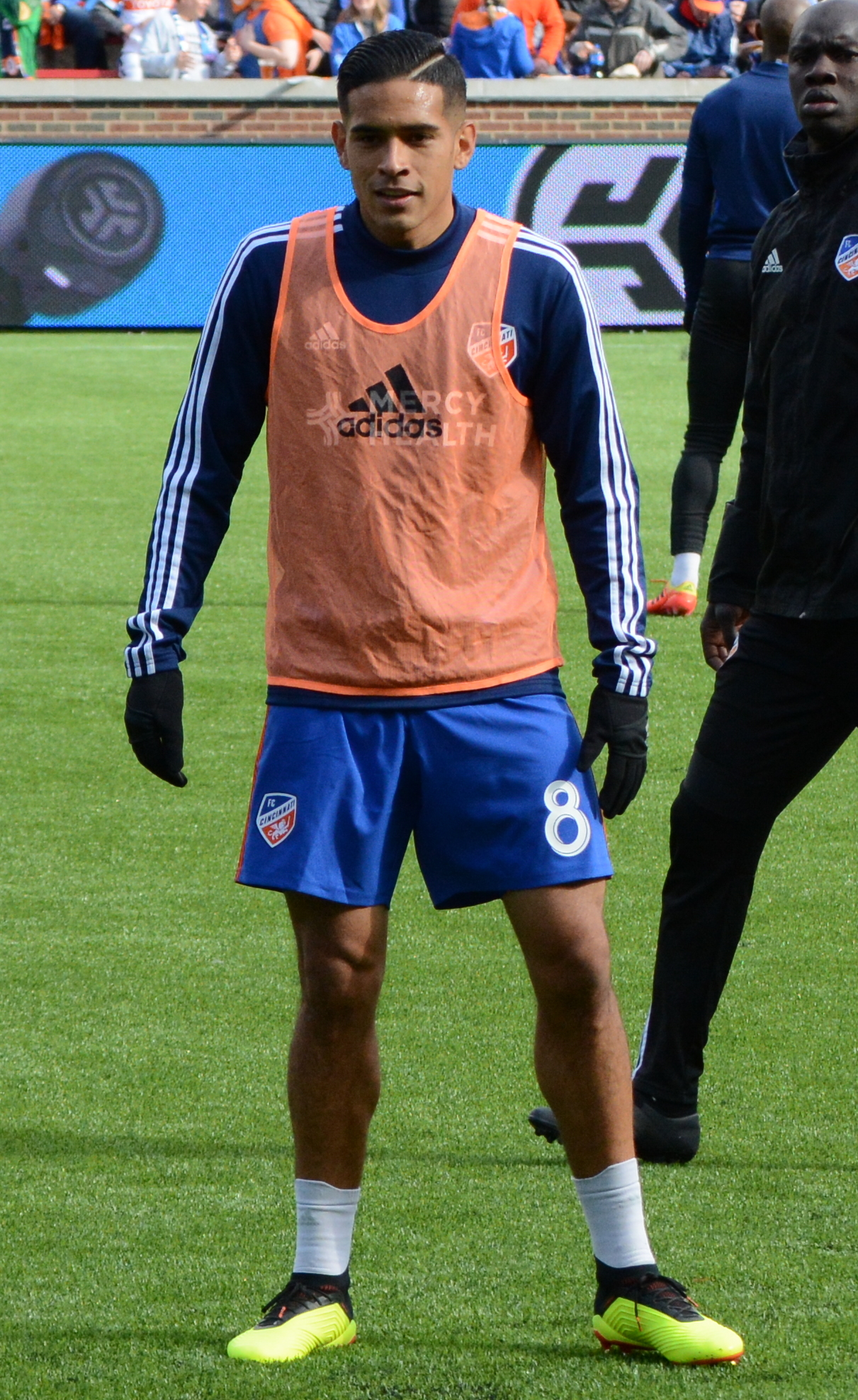
- Ulloa with FC Cincinnati in 2019

Personal information
- Date of birth: 4 March 1992 (age 34)
- Place of birth: Ciudad Juárez, Chihuahua, Mexico
- Height: 1.83 m (6 ft 0 in)
- Position: Defensive midfielder

Youth career
- 2009–2011: FC Dallas

Senior career*
Years	Team	Apps	(Gls)
2011–2018	FC Dallas	144	(5)
2019	FC Cincinnati	26	(1)
2020–2023	Inter Miami	73	(0)
2025	Des Moines Menace	0	(0)
Total		243	(6)
- * Club domestic league appearances and goals

Víctor Ulloa (born 4 March 1992) is a Mexican former professional footballer who played as a defensive midfielder. Ulloa began his career in the FC Dallas academy, and was signed to the Major League Soccer pro team as a homegrown player in 2010. He made his debut for Dallas in 2011, and played there for eight years before being traded to FC Cincinnati. Beginning in 2020, he played for Inter Miami CF until the end of 2023.

== Early life ==
Víctor Ulloa was born on 4 March 1992 in Chihuahua, Mexico to Guillermina and Evaristo Ulloa. He has a younger sister, Anahi, and a younger brother Ivan, both of whom are more than ten years younger than him. Ulloa grew up in Wylie, Texas.

== Career ==
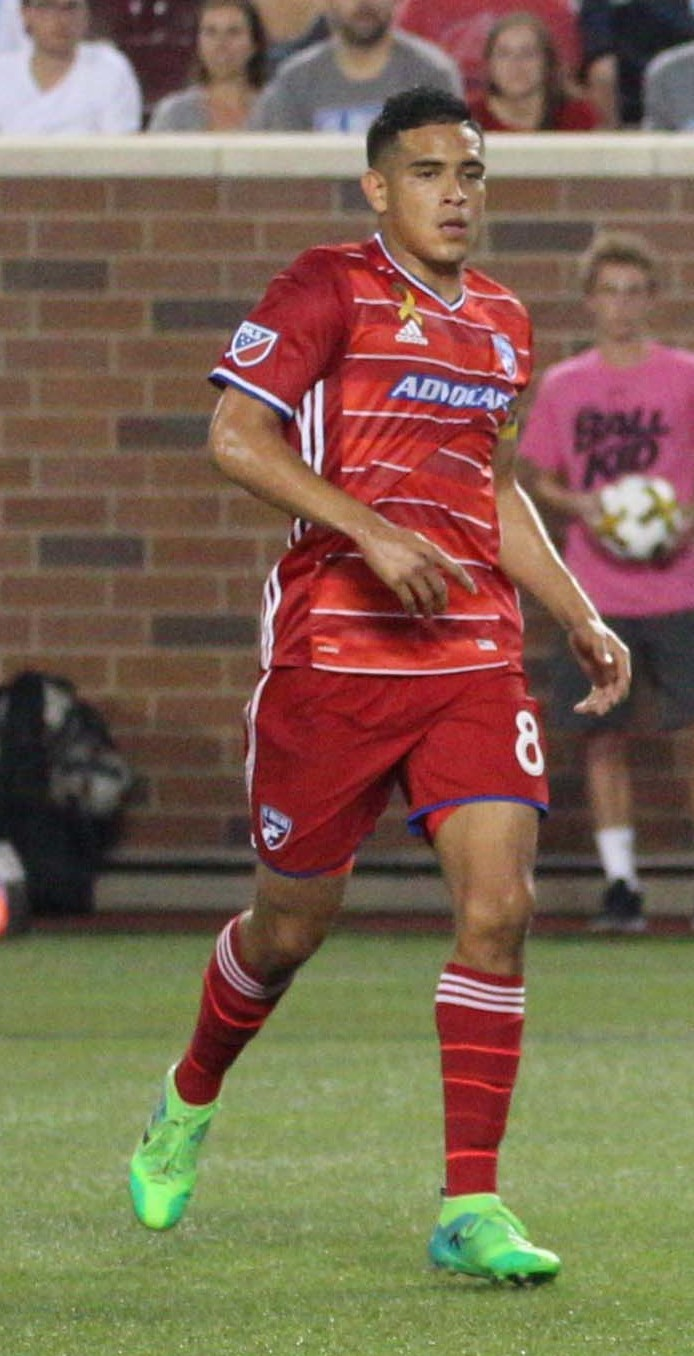
Ulloa playing for FC Dallas in 2017

On 30 July 2010, Ulloa was signed by FC Dallas as a homegrown player along with Moises Hernandez and Ruben Luna. However, he wasn't eligible to play for the first team until the 2011 season. On 23 October 2011, Ulloa made his professional debut in Dallas' 4–2 loss in their final regular season match of 2011 on the road against the San Jose Earthquakes. He did not appear in any MLS games the next two seasons. After being released by the club following the 2013 season, Ulloa re-joined the club after impressing new head coach Óscar Pareja (who was also his coach in the FC Dallas Academy) during training camp for the 2014 season. During the season, he established himself as a regular starter at defensive midfielder.

On 12 December 2018, MLS expansion side FC Cincinnati announced that they had signed Ulloa in exchange for $150,000 in General Allocation Money, with another $100,000 to be paid if Ulloa met certain performance metrics.

On 11 November 2019, Inter Miami acquired Ulloa from FC Cincinnati in exchange for $50,000 in General Allocation Money, and a 2020 MLS SuperDraft third-round selection. The club's also exchanged places in the 2019 MLS Re-Entry Draft. Following the 2021 season, Ulloa's contract option was declined by Miami. On 12 December 2021, Ulloa re-signed with Miami on a contract through to 2023.

== Career statistics ==
=== Club ===
As of match played 23 September 2023

Appearances and goals by club, season and competition
Club	Season	League			Cup		Continental		Other		Total	
Club	Season	Division	Apps	Goals	Apps	Goals	Apps	Goals	Apps	Goals	Apps	Goals
FC Dallas	2011	MLS	1	0	—		—		—		1	0
FC Dallas	2012	MLS	0	0	—		—		—		0	0
FC Dallas	2013	MLS	0	0	—		—		—		0	0
FC Dallas	2014	MLS	28	0	4	0	—		3 (Note: Appearances in MLS Cup Playoffs)	0	35	0
FC Dallas	2015	MLS	33	2	2	0	—		4	0	39	2
FC Dallas	2016	MLS	32	2	5	1	3 (Note: Appearances in CONCACAF Champions League)	0	1	0	41	3
FC Dallas	2017	MLS	23	0	3	0	—		—		26	0
FC Dallas	2018	MLS	27	1	2	0	2	0	—		31	1
FC Dallas	Total		144	5	16	1	5	0	8	0	173	6
FC Cincinnati	2019	MLS	26	1	2	0	—		—		28	1
Inter Miami	2020	MLS	23	0	—		—		1	0	24	0
Inter Miami	2021	MLS	21	0	—		—		—		21	0
Inter Miami	2022	MLS	19	0	2	0	—		—		21	0
Inter Miami	2023	MLS	10	0	2	0	—		4 (Note: Appearances in Leagues Cup)	0	16	0
Inter Miami	Total		73	0	4	0	—		5	0	82	0
Career total			243	6	22	1	5	0	13	0	283	7

== Honours ==
FC Dallas

- U.S. Open Cup: 2016
- Supporters' Shield: 2016

Inter Miami

- Leagues Cup: 2023
