= Juan Esteban Ortiz =

Colombian footballer (born 1987)

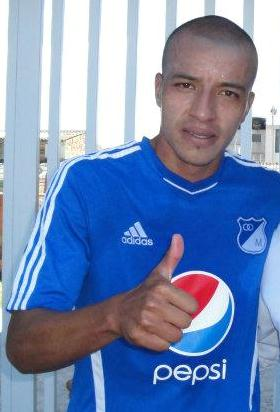
- Ortiz with Millionarios

Personal information
- Full name: Juan Esteban Ortiz
- Date of birth: August 29, 1987 (age 39)
- Place of birth: Medellín, Colombia
- Height: 1.77 m (5 ft 10 in)
- Position: Defensive midfielder

Youth career
- Independiente Medellín

Senior career*
Years	Team	Apps	(Gls)
2006–2010	Independiente Medellín	125	(5)
2011–2014	Millonarios	117	(3)
2015–2016	Atlético Huila	25	(0)
2016	FC Dallas	5	(0)
2017	Rionegro Águilas	9	(0)
2017	Chorrillo	5	(0)
2018	Deportes Quindío	10	(0)
2019	Unión Magdalena	4	(0)
2021–2022	Estudiantes	20	(0)
Total		320	(8)
- * Club domestic league appearances and goals

Juan Esteban Ortiz (born August 29, 1987) is a Colombian former professional footballer who played as a midfielder.
