= Carlos Lizarazo =

Colombian footballer (born 1991)

Personal information
- Full name: Carlos David Lizarazo Landazury
- Date of birth: April 26, 1991 (age 35)
- Place of birth: Cali, Colombia
- Height: 1.71 m (5 ft 7 1/2 in)
- Position: Attacking midfielder

Team information
- Current team: Deportivo Cali
- Number: 8

Senior career*
Years	Team	Apps	(Gls)
2009–2014	Deportivo Cali	75	(14)
2014–2017	Cruz Azul	0	(0)
2016	→ FC Dallas (loan)	8	(0)
2017	Alianza Petrolera	17	(4)
2017–2018	América de Cali	36	(1)
2019	Once Caldas	11	(1)
2020–	Deportivo Cali	7	(1)
- * Club domestic league appearances and goals

Carlos David Lizarazo Landazury (born 26 April 1991) is a Colombian football player who plays as a forward and midfielder for Categoría Primera A side Deportivo Cali.

In 2016, he went out on loan to FC Dallas of Major League Soccer.
