= 2017 MLS expansion draft =

Player draft for MLS teams

2017 MLS Expansion Draft

General information
- Date: December 12, 2017

Overview
- Expansion team: Los Angeles FC
- Expansion season: 2018

The 2017 MLS Expansion Draft was a special draft for the Major League Soccer expansion team Los Angeles FC held on December 12, 2017. Lists of protected rosters and draft-eligible players were released by MLS on December 10, 2017.

== Format ==
The rules for the 2017 MLS Expansion Draft as laid out by Major League Soccer.

- Existing teams are allowed to protect 11 players from their Senior, Supplemental and Reserve Roster. Generation Adidas players and Homegrown Players on supplemental rosters are automatically protected and exempt from the expansion draft. Though players who graduated from the Generation Adidas program to the senior roster at the end of the 2017 season are not exempt.
- Only one player may be claimed from each club’s non-protected roster, that team is then eliminated from the expansion draft and not allowed to lose any further players.
- The expansion draft will last 5 rounds totaling 5 players to be drafted.

== Expansion Draft Picks ==
Pick	MLS Team	Player	Previous Team	Trade Notes
1	Los Angeles FC	Tyler Miller	Seattle Sounders FC	
2	Los Angeles FC	Latif Blessing	Sporting Kansas City	
3	Los Angeles FC	Marco Ureña (INTL)	San Jose Earthquakes	
4	Los Angeles FC	Jukka Raitala (INTL)	Columbus Crew SC	Traded to Montreal Impact in exchange for Laurent Ciman.
5	Los Angeles FC	Raheem Edwards	Toronto FC	Traded to Montreal Impact in exchange for Laurent Ciman.

== Affected Post-Draft Trades ==
- This section will show any publicized details of trades made regarding players involved in the expansion draft.

== Team-by-team-breakdown ==
Legend
Selected by Los Angeles FC
(DP) - Designated Player
(FA) - Free agent
(GA) - Generation Adidas
(HGP) - Homegrown player
(INTL) - International player

=== Atlanta United FC ===
As of December 10, 2017

Exposed	Protected	Exempt
Mikey Ambrose	Miguel Almirón (DP) (INTL)	Andrew Carleton (HGP)
Yamil Asad (INTL)	Carlos Carmona (INTL)	Chris Goslin (HGP)
Mark Bloom	Greg Garza	Miles Robinson (GA)
Bobby Boswell (FA)	Leandro González Pírez (INTL)	
Kevin Kratz	Julian Gressel (INTL)	
Jeff Larentowicz (FA)	Brad Guzan	
Zach Loyd (FA)	Alec Kann	
Chris McCann	Josef Martínez (DP) (INTL)	
Tyrone Mears	Michael Parkhurst	
Kévin Oliveira (INTL)	Brandon Vazquez	
Jeffrey Otoo (INTL)	Héctor Villalba (DP) (INTL)	
Tyler Pasher (INTL)		
Jacob Peterson		
Kyle Reynish (FA)		
Anton Walkes (INTL)		
Andrew Wheeler-Omiunu		
Romario Williams (INTL)		

=== Chicago Fire ===
As of December 10, 2017

Exposed	Protected	Exempt
David Arshakyan (INTL)	David Accam (DP)	Drew Conner (HGP)
Jorge Bava (INTL)	Jonathan Campbell	Collin Fernandez (HGP)
Brandt Bronico	Johan Kappelhof (INTL)	Djordje Mihailovic (HGP)
Stefan Cleveland	Dax McCarty	Patrick Doody (HGP)
Jorge Corrales	Nemanja Nikolić (DP) (INTL)	Joey Calistri (HGP)
Michael de Leeuw (INTL)	Juninho	
Christian Dean	Matt Polster	
Matej Dekovic (INTL)	Richard Sánchez	
John Goossens (INTL)	Bastian Schweinsteiger (DP) (INTL)	
Michael Harrington (FA)	Luis Solignac (INTL)	
Daniel Johnson	Brandon Vincent	
Matt Lampson		
João Meira (INTL)		

=== Colorado Rapids ===
As of December 10, 2017

Exposed	Protected	Exempt
John Berner	Stefan Aigner (INTL)	Caleb Calvert (HGP)
Bobby Burling (FA)	Micheal Azira	Kortne Ford (HGP)
Dennis Castillo (INTL)	Dominique Badji (INTL)	Dillon Serna (HGP)
Mike da Fonte	Nana Boateng (INTL)	Ricardo Perez (HGP)
Josh Gatt	Shkëlzen Gashi (DP) (INTL)	Kevin Doyle
Luis Gil	Marlon Hairston	
Alan Gordon (FA)	Tim Howard (DP)	
Sam Hamilton	Zac MacMath	
Mohammed Saeid (INTL)	Eric Miller	
Mekeil Williams (INTL)	Axel Sjöberg	
	Jared Watts	

=== Columbus Crew SC ===
As of December 10, 2017

Exposed	Protected	Exempt
Waylon Francis	Mohammed Abu (INTL)	Alex Crognale (HGP)
Niko Hansen	Lalas Abubakar (INTL)	Ben Swanson (HGP)
Marshall Hollingsworth	Harrison Afful	
Adam Jahn	Artur (INTL)	
Hector Jiménez	Federico Higuaín (DP)	
Logan Ketterer	Ola Kamara (INTL)	
Connor Maloney	Kekuta Manneh	
Cristian Martínez (INTL)	Pedro Santos (DP) (INTL)	
Jonathan Mensah (DP) (INTL)	Justin Meram	
Abuchi Obinwa	Zack Steffen	
Jukka Raitala (INTL)	Wil Trapp	
Rodrigo Saravia (INTL)		
Gastón Sauro		
Brad Stuver		
Josh Williams		

=== D.C. United ===
As of December 10, 2017

Exposed	Protected	Exempt
Deshorn Brown (INTL)	Luciano Acosta (INTL)	Chris Durkin (HGP)
Julian Büscher (INTL)	Paul Arriola (DP)	Ian Harkes (HGP)
Steve Clark	Steve Birnbaum	Jalen Robinson (HGP)
Sean Franklin (FA)	Frédéric Brillant (INTL)	Chris Rolfe
Bill Hamid	Russell Canouse	
Jared Jeffrey	Nick DeLeon	
Eric Klenofsky	Taylor Kemp	
Chris Korb	Darren Mattocks	
Bruno Miranda (INTL)	Patrick Mullins	
Patrick Nyarko (FA)	Kofi Opare	
Chris Odoi-Atsem	Zoltán Stieber (INTL)	
Lloyd Sam		
Marcelo Sarvas		
Rob Vincent		
Travis Worra		

=== FC Dallas ===
As of December 10, 2017

Exposed	Protected	Exempt
Carlos Cermeño (INTL)	Kellyn Acosta	Coy Craft (HGP)
Aníbal Chalá (DP) (INTL)	Tesho Akindele	Jesse González (HGP)
Eduardo Cortes	Michael Barrios (INTL)	Bryan Reynolds (HGP)
Maynor Figueroa (INTL)	Cristian Colmán (DP) (INTL)	Paxton Pomykal (HGP)
Luis González (INTL)	Mauro Díaz	Aaron Guillen (HGP)
Hernán Grana (INTL)	Carlos Gruezo (DP) (INTL)	Jesús Ferreira (HGP)
Atiba Harris (FA)	Jacori Hayes	Reggie Cannon (HGP)
Walker Hume	Matt Hedges	Adonijah Reid (GA)
Roland Lamah (INTL)	Ryan Hollingshead	
Javier Morales (FA)	Victor Ulloa	
Chris Seitz (FA)	Maxi Urruti	

=== Houston Dynamo ===
As of December 10, 2017

Exposed	Protected	Exempt
Eric Alexander (FA)	Juan David Cabezas (INTL)	Tyler Deric (HGP)
Arturo Álvarez	Leonardo	Memo Rodríguez (HGP)
Jalil Anibaba	Alberth Elis (DP) (INTL)	Christian Lucatero (HGP)
DaMarcus Beasley (FA)	Adolfo Machado (INTL)	
Boniek García	Mauro Manotas	
Calle Brown	Tomás Martínez (DP) (INTL)	
Ricardo Clark (FA)	Romell Quioto (INTL)	
A. J. DeLaGarza (FA)	Dylan Remick	
José Escalante (INTL)	Erick Torres (DP)	
Kevin Garcia	Andrew Wenger	
Joe Holland (INTL)	Joe Willis	
Taylor Hunter		
George Malki		
Alex		
Vicente Sánchez		
Philippe Senderos (INTL)		
Charlie Ward (INTL)		

=== LA Galaxy ===
As of December 10, 2017

Exposed	Protected	Exempt
Michaël Ciani (INTL)	Romain Alessandrini (DP) (INTL)	Robbie Rogers
Bradley Diallo (INTL)	João Pedro (INTL)	Hugo Arellano (HGP)
Clément Diop	Emmanuel Boateng	Jose Villarreal (HGP)
Jermaine Jones	Ashley Cole (INTL)	Raúl Mendiola (HGP) (INTL)
Rafael Garcia	Giovani dos Santos (DP) (INTL)	Jaime Villarreal (HGP)
Jon Kempin	Jonathan dos Santos (DP) (INTL)	Nathan Smith (HGP)
Ariel Lassiter	Baggio Hušidić	Bradford Jamieson IV (HGP)
Jack McInerney	Sebastian Lletget	Jack McBean (HGP)
Brian Rowe	David Romney	
Pele van Anholt (INTL)	Daniel Steres	
	Gyasi Zardes	

=== Minnesota United FC ===
As of December 10, 2017

Exposed	Protected	Exempt
Bernardo Añor	Bobby Shuttleworth	Abu Danladi (GA) (INTL)
Justin Davis	Francisco Calvo (INTL)	Collin Martin (HGP)
Thomas De Villardi	Michael Boxall (INTL)	Harrison Heath (HGP)
Vadim Demidov (INTL)	Brent Kallman	
Joe Greenspan	Jérôme Thiesson (INTL)	
Miguel Ibarra	Marc Burch	
Ismaila Jome	Sam Cronin	
Alex Kapp	Kevin Molino	
José Leitón (INTL)	Ibson	
Patrick McLain	Ethan Finlay	
Sam Nicholson (INTL)	Christian Ramirez	
Rasmus Schüller (INTL)		
Jermaine Taylor		
Johan Venegas (INTL)		
Kevin Venegas		
Collen Warner		

=== Montreal Impact ===
As of December 10, 2017

Exposed	Protected	Exempt
Hernán Bernardello (INTL)	Ambroise Oyongo (INTL)	David Choinière (HGP)
Patrice Bernier	Evan Bush	Maxime Crépeau (HGP)
Deian Boldor (INTL)	Víctor Cabrera (INTL)	Louis Béland-Goyette (HGP)
Hassoun Camara	Laurent Ciman (INTL)	Anthony Jackson-Hamel (HGP)
Nick DePuy	Marco Donadel (INTL)	Shamit Shome (GA)
Shaun Francis (FA)	Chris Duvall	Ballou Tabla (HGP)
Eric Kronberg (FA)	Blerim Džemaili (DP) (INTL)	
Wandrille Lefèvre	Kyle Fisher	
Matteo Mancosu (INTL)	Daniel Lovitz	
Dominic Oduro	Ignacio Piatti (DP) (INTL)	
Andrés Romero (INTL)	Samuel Piette	
Michael Salazar		

=== New England Revolution ===
As of December 10, 2017

Exposed	Protected	Exempt
Benjamin Angoua (INTL)	Juan Agudelo	Scott Caldwell (HGP)
Femi Hollinger-Janzen	Teal Bunbury	Zachary Herivaux (HGP)
Brad Knighton (FA)	Cody Cropper	
Daigo Kobayashi	Antonio Delamea Mlinar (INTL)	
Xavier Kouassi (INTL)	Claude Dielna (INTL)	
Donnie Smith	Diego Fagúndez	
Joshua Smith	Andrew Farrell	
Chris Tierney	Gershon Koffie (INTL)	
Matt Turner	Krisztián Németh (INTL)	
Je-Vaughn Watson	Lee Nguyen	
London Woodberry	Kelyn Rowe	
Brian Wright		

=== New York City FC ===
As of December 10, 2017

Exposed	Protected	Exempt
R. J. Allen	Alexander Callens (INTL)	Jonathan Lewis (GA)
Kwame Awuah	Jack Harrison	James Sands (HGP)
Miguel Camargo (INTL)	Yangel Herrera (INTL)	Andrea Pirlo
Maxime Chanot (INTL)	Sean Johnson	
Shannon Gomez	Rónald Matarrita	
Eirik Johansen	Tommy McNamara	
Mikey Lopez	Maximiliano Moralez (DP) (INTL)	
Jefferson Mena (INTL)	Alexander Ring (INTL)	
Sean Okoli	Ben Sweat	
John Stertzer	David Villa (DP) (INTL)	
Andraž Struna (INTL)	Rodney Wallace	
Ethan White		

=== New York Red Bulls ===
As of December 10, 2017

Exposed	Protected	Exempt
Anatole Abang (INTL)	Felipe	Tyler Adams (HGP)
Gideon Baah (INTL)	Fidel Escobar (INTL)	Sean Davis (HGP)
Vincent Bezecourt (INTL)	Sacha Kljestan (DP)	Derrick Etienne (HGP)
Aurélien Collin (INTL)	Kemar Lawrence (INTL)	Arun Basuljevic (HGP)
Dilly Duka (FA)	Aaron Long	Alex Muyl (HGP)
Mike Grella	Ryan Meara	Evan Louro (HGP)
Muhamed Keita (INTL)	Michael Amir Murillo (INTL)	Brandon Allen (HGP)
Connor Lade	Luis Robles	
Zeiko Lewis (INTL)	Daniel Royer (INTL)	
Dan Metzger	Gonzalo Verón (INTL)	
Hassan Ndam (INTL)	Bradley Wright-Phillips (DP)	
Damien Perrinelle (INTL)		
Sal Zizzo (FA)		

=== Orlando City SC ===
As of December 10, 2017

Exposed	Protected	Exempt
Kevin Alston	José Aja (INTL)	Richie Laryea (GA) (INTL)
Giles Barnes (FA)	Joe Bendik	Tommy Redding (HGP)
Hadji Barry	Dom Dwyer	Mason Stajduhar (HGP)
Servando Carrasco	Cristian Higuita	Kaká
Pierre da Silva	Will Johnson	
Conor Donovan	Cyle Larin	
Earl Edwards Jr.	Carlos Rivas (DP)	
Devron García (INTL)	Jonathan Spector	
PC (INTL)	Scott Sutter (INTL)	
Seb Hines	Donny Toia	
Antonio Nocerino	Yoshimar Yotún (DP) (INTL)	
Léo Pereira (INTL)		
Dillon Powers		
Rafael Ramos		
Tony Rocha		
Josh Saunders (FA)		

=== Philadelphia Union ===
As of December 10, 2017

Exposed	Protected	Exempt
Roland Alberg (INTL)	Alejandro Bedoya (DP)	Adam Najem (HGP)
Eric Ayuk (INTL)	Andre Blake (INTL)	Derrick Jones (HGP)
Warren Creavalle	Jack Elliott (INTL)	Auston Trusty (HGP)
Charlie Davies	Marcus Epps	Joshua Yaro (GA) (INTL)
Maurice Edu (DP)	Fabinho	Brian Carroll
Ray Gaddis	Fabian Herbers	
Aaron Jones (INTL)	Haris Medunjanin (INTL)	
Richie Marquez	Ilsinho (INTL)	
John McCarthy	Fafà Picault	
Jake McGuire	Keegan Rosenberry	
Oguchi Onyewu	C. J. Sapong	
Chris Pontius (FA)		
Jay Simpson (INTL)		
Ken Tribbett		
Giliano Wijnaldum (INTL)		

=== Portland Timbers ===
As of December 10, 2017

Exposed	Protected	Exempt
Victor Arboleda (INTL)	Fanendo Adi (DP)	Jeremy Ebobisse (GA)
Gbenga Arokoyo (INTL)	Vytas	Marco Farfan (HGP)
Jeff Attinella	Dairon Asprilla	
Jack Barmby (INTL)	Sebastián Blanco (DP) (INTL)	
Rennico Clarke (INTL)	Diego Chará	
Jake Gleeson	David Guzmán (INTL)	
Kendall McIntosh	Larrys Mabiala (INTL)	
Lucas Melano (INTL)	Darlington Nagbe	
Roy Miller	Alvas Powell	
Chance Myers	Liam Ridgewell	
Amobi Okugo	Diego Valeri (DP)	
Lawrence Olum		
Bill Tuiloma (INTL)		
Zarek Valentin		
Ben Zemanski (FA)		

=== Real Salt Lake ===
As of December 10, 2017

Exposed	Protected	Exempt
Chad Barrett (FA)	Kyle Beckerman	Danilo Acosta (HGP)
Tony Beltran	Justen Glad (HGP)	Jordan Allen (HGP)
Nick Besler	David Horst	José Hernández (HGP) (INTL)
Reagan Dunk	Luke Mulholland	Brooks Lennon (HGP)
Omar Holness (INTL)	Joao Plata	Ricardo Velazco (HGP)
Yura Movsisyan (DP)	Nick Rimando	
Stephen Sunday	Albert Rusnák (DP) (INTL)	
Demar Phillips (INTL)	Sebastian Saucedo	
Justin Schmidt	Jefferson Savarino (DP) (INTL)	
Chris Schuler (FA)	Luis Silva	
Connor Sparrow	Marcelo Silva (INTL)	
Matt Van Oekel		
Chris Wingert (FA)		

=== San Jose Earthquakes ===
As of December 10, 2017

Exposed	Protected	Exempt
François Affolter (INTL)	Fatai Alashe	Tommy Thompson (HGP)
Quincy Amarikwa	David Bingham	Nick Lima (HGP)
Leandro Barrera (INTL)	Darwin Cerén	Jackson Yueill (GA)
Víctor Bernárdez	Aníbal Godoy (INTL)	Marvell Wynne
Matt Bersano	Danny Hoesen (INTL)	
Cordell Cato	Jahmir Hyka (INTL)	
Kip Colvey	Florian Jungwirth (INTL)	
Harold Cummings (INTL)	Vako (DP) (INTL)	
Simon Dawkins (DP) (INTL)	Shea Salinas	
Andrés Imperiale (INTL)	Andrew Tarbell	
Lindo Mfeka (INTL)	Chris Wondolowski (DP)	
Marc Pelosi		
Kofi Sarkodie		
Matheus Silva (INTL)		
Marco Ureña (INTL)		

=== Seattle Sounders FC ===
As of December 10, 2017

Exposed	Protected	Exempt
Tony Alfaro	Will Bruin	Aaron Kovar (HGP)
Osvaldo Alonso (DP)	Clint Dempsey (DP)	Seyi Adekoya (HGP)
Jordy Delem (INTL)	Stefan Frei	Jordan Morris (HGP)
Brad Evans (FA)	Kelvin Leerdam (INTL)	Henry Wingo (HGP)
Oniel Fisher	Nicolás Lodeiro (DP) (INTL)	
Joevin Jones (INTL)	Chad Marshall	
Calum Mallace	Víctor Rodríguez (INTL)	
Zach Mathers	Cristian Roldan	
Bryan Meredith	Gustav Svensson (INTL)	
Tyler Miller	Nouhou Tolo (INTL)	
Lamar Neagle (FA)	Román Torres (INTL)	
Harry Shipp		

=== Sporting Kansas City ===
As of December 10, 2017

Exposed	Protected	Exempt
Saad Abdul-Salaam	Matt Besler	Kevin Ellis (HGP)
Kharlton Belmar	Roger Espinoza (DP)	Gianluca Busio (HGP)
Latif Blessing	Benny Feilhaber	Erik Palmer-Brown (HGP)
Amer Didic	Gerso Fernandes (DP)	Dániel Sallói (HGP) (INTL)
Andrew Dykstra	Cristian Lobato (INTL)	
Cameron Iwasa	Jimmy Medranda	
Kenwyne Jones	Tim Melia	
Soni Mustivar (INTL)	James Musa (INTL)	
Cameron Porter	Ike Opara	
Diego Rubio	Ilie Sánchez	
Soony Saad	Graham Zusi (DP)	
Seth Sinovic		
Colton Storm		
Alex Tambakis		
Adrian Zendejas		

=== Toronto FC ===
As of December 10, 2017

Exposed	Protected	Exempt
Øyvind Alseth (INTL)	Jozy Altidore (DP)	Jay Chapman (HGP)
Brandon Aubrey	Alex Bono	Jordan Hamilton (HGP)
Steven Beitashour (FA)	Michael Bradley (DP)	Ashtone Morgan (HGP)
Benoît Cheyrou (INTL)	Marky Delgado	Sergio Camargo (HGP)
Armando Cooper (INTL)	Sebastian Giovinco (DP) (INTL)	Ben Spencer (HGP)
Raheem Edwards	Nick Hagglund	
Tsubasa Endoh (INTL)	Chris Mavinga (INTL)	
Nicolas Hasler (INTL)	Justin Morrow	
Jason Hernandez (FA)	Jonathan Osorio	
Clint Irwin	Víctor Vázquez (INTL)	
Drew Moor (FA)	Eriq Zavaleta	
Mark Pais		
Tosaint Ricketts		

=== Vancouver Whitecaps FC ===
As of December 10, 2017

Exposed	Protected	Exempt
Christian Bolaños (INTL)	Ali Ghazal (INTL)	Sam Adekugbe (HGP)
Marcel de Jong	Erik Hurtado	Marco Bustos (HGP)
David Edgar	Kei Kamara (DP)	Alphonso Davies (HGP)
Deybi Flores (INTL)	Stefan Marinovic (INTL)	Ben McKendry (HGP)
Kyle Greig	Nicolás Mezquida (INTL)	Russell Teibert (HGP)
Jordan Harvey (FA)	Fredy Montero (DP)	
Bernie Ibini-Isei (INTL)	Jake Nerwinski	
Nosa Igiebor (INTL)	Tim Parker	
Andrew Jacobson (FA)	Yordy Reyna (INTL)	
Matías Laba (INTL)	Tony Tchani	
Brett Levis	Kendall Waston (INTL)	
Aaron Maund		
David Ousted (INTL)		
Spencer Richey		
Mauro Rosales		
Cole Seiler		
Brek Shea (DP)		
Cristian Techera (INTL)		
Sheanon Williams		
