= 2018 FC Dallas season =

FC Dallas
2018 season
- Owner: Clark Hunt
- Head coach: Óscar Pareja
- Stadium: Toyota Stadium
- MLS: Conference: 4th Overall: 6th
- 2018 CCL: Round of 16
- MLS Cup Playoffs: Knockout Round
- U.S. Open Cup: Round of 16
- Texas Derby: Champions
- Brimstone Cup: Champions
- Pioneer Cup: Runner-up
- Top goalscorer: League: Maxi Urruti & Roland Lamah (8); All: Maxi Urruti & Roland Lamah (9)
- Highest home attendance: 19,096 (October 21 vs. Sporting Kansas City)
- Lowest home attendance: 3,318 (Feb. 28 vs. Tauro F.C.)
- Average home league attendance: MLS: 15,512; Playoffs: 10,297; CCL: 3,318
| Primary colors | Secondary colors |

The 2018 FC Dallas season was the club's 23rd season in Major League Soccer, the top tier of American soccer. FC Dallas also participated in the CONCACAF Champions League and the U.S. Open Cup.

== Transfers ==
=== In ===
| No. | Pos. | Nat. | Name | Age | Moving from | Type | Transfer window | Ends | Transfer fee | Source |
|---|---|---|---|---|---|---|---|---|---|---|
| 14 | GK | (United States) | Jimmy Maurer | 29 | New York Cosmos (United States) | Transfer | Pre-season | Undisclosed | Free | |
| 6 | DF | (Bulgaria) | Anton Nedyalkov | 24 | CSKA Sofia (Bulgaria) | Transfer | Pre-season | Undisclosed | Free | |
| 3 | DF | (Switzerland) | Reto Ziegler | 31 | FC Luzern (Switzerland) | Transfer | Pre-season | Undisclosed | Free | |
| 18 | MF | (United States) | Brandon Servania | 18 | FC Dallas Academy (United States) | Transfer | Pre-season | Undisclosed | HGP contract | |
| 32 | DF | (United States) | Kris Reaves | 22 | FC Dallas Academy (United States) | Transfer | Pre-season | Undisclosed | HGP contract | |
| 34 | DF | (United States) | Jordan Cano | 21 | FC Dallas Academy (United States) | Transfer | Pre-season | Undisclosed | HGP contract | |
| 30 | GK | (United States) | Kyle Zobeck | 28 | New York Cosmos (United States) | Transfer | Pre-season | Undisclosed | Free | |
| 99 | DF | (United States) | Chris Richards | 18 | FC Dallas Academy (United States) | Transfer | Mid-season | Undisclosed | HGP contract | |
| 6 | DF | (Brazil) | Marquinhos Pedroso | 24 | Figueirense (Brazil) | Allocation money | Mid-season | Undisclosed | Free | |
| 16 | FW | (Senegal) | Dominique Badji | 25 | Colorado Rapids (United States) | Trade | Mid-season | Undisclosed | Kellyn Acosta, 2019 first and second round picks | |
| 10 | MF | (Chile) | Pablo Aránguiz | 21 | Unión Española (Chile) | Allocation money | Mid-season | Undisclosed | Free | |
| 23 | MF | (United States) | Thomas Roberts | 17 | FC Dallas Academy (United States) | Transfer | Mid-season | Undisclosed | HGP contract | |
| 5 | DF | (Guatemala) | Moises Hernandez | 26 | Comunicaciones F.C. (Guatemala) | Transfer | Mid-season | Undisclosed | Free | |
| 44 | MF | (Colombia) | Abel Aguilar | 33 | Deportivo Cali (Colombia) | Transfer | Mid-season | Undisclosed | Free | |

==== Draft picks ====
| Round | Selection | Pos. | Name | College | Signed | Source |
|---|---|---|---|---|---|---|
| 1 | 4 | FW | (Ghana) Francis Atuahene | Michigan | Generation Adidas | |
| 1 | 11 | MF | (Ghana) Ema Twumasi | Wake Forest | Generation Adidas | |
| 2 | 29 | FW | (Venezuela) Mauro Cichero | SMU | Unsigned | |
| 2 | 34 | MF | (United States) Chris Lema | Georgetown | Not signed, signed with New York Red Bull II | |
| 3 | 57 | MF | (Germany) Amer Sasivarevic | Grand Canyon | Not signed, signed with Ogden City SC | |
| 4 | 80 | DF | (United States) Noah Franke | Creighton | Not signed, signed with Pittsburgh Riverhounds | |

=== Out ===
| No. | Pos. | Nat. | Name | Age | Moving to | Type | Transfer window | Transfer fee | Source |
|---|---|---|---|---|---|---|---|---|---|
| 2 | DF | (Argentina) | Hernán Grana | 32 | Ferro Carril Oeste (Argentina) | End of loan | Pre-season | Free | |
| 5 | DF | (Venezuela) | Carlos Cermeño | 22 | Alianza Petrolera (Colombia) | End of loan | Pre-season | Free | |
| 17 | MF | (Venezuela) | Luis González | 27 | Monagas SC (Venezuela) | End of loan | Pre-season | Free | |
| 11 | MF | (Argentina) | Javier Morales | 38 | None | Retired | Pre-season | Free | |
| 14 | DF | (Saint Kitts and Nevis) | Atiba Harris | 32 | Murciélagos (Mexico) | Option Declined | Pre-season | Free | |
| 16 | FW | (United States) | Coy Craft | 32 | Miami FC (United States) | Option Declined | Pre-season | Free | |
| 18 | GK | (United States) | Chris Seitz | 30 | Houston Dynamo (United States) | Option Declined | Pre-season | Free | |
| 26 | DF | (United States) | Walker Hume | 24 | Orange County SC (United States) | Option Declined | Pre-season | Free | |
| 33 | DF | (Mexico) | Aaron Guillen | 24 | North Carolina FC (United States) | Option Declined | Pre-season | Free | |
| 25 | DF | (United States) | Walker Zimmerman | 26 | Los Angeles FC (United States) | Trade | Pre-season | Allocation money | |
| 28 | FW | (United States) | Shaft Brewer | 18 | Los Angeles FC (United States) | Trade | Mid-season | Allocation money | |
| 6 | DF | (Bulgaria) | Anton Nedyalkov | 25 | Ludogorets (Bulgaria) | Transfer | Mid-season | Undisclosed | |
| 10 | MF | (Argentina) | Mauro Díaz | 27 | Shabab Al Ahli Club (United Arab Emirates) | Transfer | Mid-season | Undisclosed | |
| 23 | MF | (United States) | Kellyn Acosta | 22 | Colorado Rapids (United States) | Trade | Mid-season | Dominique Badji, international roster spot, 2019 first-round pick | |

== Club ==
=== Roster ===
As of August 27, 2018. Note: Flags indicate national team as defined under FIFA eligibility rules; some limited exceptions apply. Players may hold more than one non-FIFA nationality.

| No. | Pos. | Nation | Player |
|---|---|---|---|
| 1 | GK | USA | Jesse Gonzalez (HGP) |
| 2 | DF | USA | Reggie Cannon (HGP) |
| 3 | DF | SUI | Reto Ziegler |
| 5 | DF | GUA | Moises Hernandez |
| 6 | DF | BRA | Marquinhos Pedroso |
| 7 | MF | ECU | Carlos Gruezo (DP) |
| 8 | MF | MEX | Victor Ulloa (HGP) |
| 9 | FW | PAR | Cristian Colmán (DP) |
| 10 | MF | CHI | Pablo Aránguiz |
| 11 | MF | COL | Santiago Mosquera (DP) |
| 12 | MF | USA | Ryan Hollingshead |
| 13 | FW | CAN | Tesho Akindele |
| 14 | GK | USA | Jimmy Maurer |
| 15 | MF | USA | Jacori Hayes |
| 16 | FW | SEN | Dominique Badji |

| No. | Pos. | Nation | Player |
|---|---|---|---|
| 19 | MF | USA | Paxton Pomykal (HGP) |
| 20 | MF | BEL | Roland Lamah |
| 21 | MF | COL | Michael Barrios |
| 22 | FW | GHA | Ema Twumasi (GA) |
| 23 | MF | USA | Thomas Roberts (HGP) |
| 24 | DF | USA | Matt Hedges |
| 27 | FW | COL | Jesús Ferreira (HGP) |
| 29 | FW | USA | Bryan Reynolds (HGP) |
| 30 | GK | USA | Kyle Zobeck |
| 31 | DF | HON | Maynor Figueroa |
| 32 | DF | USA | Kris Reaves (HGP) |
| 34 | DF | USA | Jordan Cano (HGP) |
| 37 | FW | ARG | Maximiliano Urruti |
| 44 | MF | COL | Abel Aguilar |

=== Out on loan ===
Note: Flags indicate national team as defined under FIFA eligibility rules; some limited exceptions apply. Players may hold more than one non-FIFA nationality.

| No. | Pos. | Nation | Player |
|---|---|---|---|
| -- | DF | ECU | Aníbal Chalá (on loan to LDU Quito) |
| 17 | FW | GHA | Francis Atuahene (GA) (on loan to OKC Energy FC) |
| 18 | MF | USA | Brandon Servania (HGP) (on loan to Tulsa Roughnecks FC) |
| 28 | FW | CAN | Adonijah Reid (GA) (on loan to Ottawa Fury) |
| 99 | DF | USA | Chris Richards (HGP) (on loan to FC Bayern Munich) |

== Competitions ==
=== Preseason ===
https://www.mlssoccer.com/post/2017/12/06/full-list-2018-mls-preseason-matches

| January 27 | FC Dallas | 1–0 | Tulsa Golden Hurricane | Frisco, Texas |
| 11:00 CST | Reynolds | Report | | Stadium: AdvoCare Field 1 at Toyota Soccer Center |
Note: Three 30-minute periods.

| February 3 | Chattanooga FC | 1–1 | FC Dallas | Chattanooga, Tennessee |
| 12:00 EST | Zeca Ferraz | Report | Hedges | Stadium: Finley Stadium; Attendance: 4,873; Referee: Guido Gonzales |

| February 7 | FC Dallas | 1–1 | Santa Tecla | Frisco, Texas |
| 19:00 CST | Gruezo (yellow card) 38'; Akindele 53'; Urruti (yellow card) 66'; Acosta (yellow card) 85' | Report | Tamacas 20'; Reyes (yellow card) 26'; (yellow card) 90+2' | Stadium: Toyota Stadium; Referee: Jorge Luna |

| February 8 | FC Dallas | 1–1 | OKC Energy FC | Frisco, Texas |
| 10:00 CST | Servania | | Brown | Stadium: Toyota Soccer Center |

| February 10 | FC Dallas | 3–1 | Cartaginés | Frisco, Texas |
| 16:00 CST | Hollingshead 34'; Hedges 65'; Ziegler | | Flores 44' (pen.); Clunie (yellow card) 55' | Stadium: Toyota Stadium |

| February 11 | FC Dallas | 0–2 | San Antonio FC | Frisco, Texas |
| 13:00 CDT | | Report | Guzmán 29'; Tyrpak | Stadium: Toyota Soccer Center |

| February 14 | New England Revolution | 2–2 | FC Dallas | Tucson, Arizona |
| 18:00 CST | Zahibo (red card) 8'; Penilla 55'; Fagúndez 85' | Report | Díaz 15'; Urruti 77' | Stadium: Kino Veterans Memorial Stadium |

| February 17 | Portland Timbers | 1–2 | FC Dallas | Tucson, Arizona |
| 13:00 CST | Urruti 16', 39' | Report | Armenteros 71' | Stadium: Kino Veterans Memorial Stadium |

=== MLS ===
==== Western Conference standings ====
Western Conference

| Pos | Team | Pld | W | L | T | GF | GA | GD | Pts | Qualification |
|---|---|---|---|---|---|---|---|---|---|---|
| 2 | Seattle Sounders FC | 34 | 18 | 11 | 5 | 52 | 37 | +15 | 59 | MLS Cup Conference Semifinals |
| 3 | Los Angeles FC | 34 | 16 | 9 | 9 | 68 | 52 | +16 | 57 | MLS Cup Knockout Round |
| 4 | FC Dallas | 34 | 16 | 9 | 9 | 52 | 44 | +8 | 57 | MLS Cup Knockout Round |
| 5 | Portland Timbers | 34 | 15 | 10 | 9 | 54 | 48 | +6 | 54 | MLS Cup Knockout Round |
| 6 | Real Salt Lake | 34 | 14 | 13 | 7 | 55 | 58 | −3 | 49 | MLS Cup Knockout Round |

Source: MLS

==== Overall standings ====
| Pos | Team | Pld | W | L | T | GF | GA | GD | Pts |
|---|---|---|---|---|---|---|---|---|---|
| 4 | Seattle Sounders FC | 34 | 18 | 11 | 5 | 52 | 37 | +15 | 59 |
| 5 | Los Angeles FC | 34 | 16 | 9 | 9 | 68 | 52 | +16 | 57 |
| 6 | FC Dallas | 34 | 16 | 9 | 9 | 52 | 44 | +8 | 57 |
| 7 | New York City FC | 34 | 16 | 10 | 8 | 59 | 45 | +14 | 56 |
| 8 | Portland Timbers | 34 | 15 | 10 | 9 | 54 | 48 | +6 | 54 |

Source: MLS
Rules for classification: 1) points; 2) total wins; 3) total goal differential; 4) total goals scored; 5) disciplinary points; 6) away goals scored; 7) away goal differential; 8) coin toss or drawing of lots

==== Results summary ====
| Overall | | | | | | | | Home | | | | | | Away | | | | | |
| Pld | W | D | L | GF | GA | GD | Pts | W | D | L | GF | GA | GD | W | D | L | GF | GA | GD |
|---|---|---|---|---|---|---|---|---|---|---|---|---|---|---|---|---|---|---|---|
| 34 | 16 | 9 | 9 | 52 | 44 | +8 | 57 | 10 | 5 | 2 | 32 | 19 | +13 | 6 | 4 | 7 | 20 | 25 | −5 |

Last updated: October 28, 2018.
Source: Regular Season

==== Results by round ====
| Round | 1 | 2 | 3 | 4 | 5 | 6 | 7 | 8 | 9 | 10 | 11 | 12 | 13 | 14 | 15 | 16 | 17 | 18 | 19 | 20 | 21 | 22 | 23 | 24 | 25 | 26 | 27 | 28 | 29 | 30 | 31 | 32 | 33 | 34 |
|---|---|---|---|---|---|---|---|---|---|---|---|---|---|---|---|---|---|---|---|---|---|---|---|---|---|---|---|---|---|---|---|---|---|---|
| Stadium | H | H | H | H | A | H | A | A | H | H | A | A | H | H | A | A | H | A | H | A | A | H | A | H | A | A | H | H | A | A | H | A | H | A |
| Result | D | W | D | D | W | W | L | D | W | D | W | W | W | W | L | W | W | L | W | D | W | L | L | W | D | L | W | D | W | D | W | L | L | L |

Updated to match(es) played on October 28, 2018. Source: Regular Season
A = Away; H = Home; W = Win; D = Draw; L = Loss

==== Regular season ====
Kickoff times are in CDT (UTC-05) unless shown otherwise

| March 3, 2018 1 | FC Dallas | 1–1 | Real Salt Lake | Frisco, Texas |
| 7:00 p.m. CST (UTC-06) | Hayes (yellow card) 64'; Barrios (yellow card) 77'; Silva 86' (o.g.) | Report | Plata 25' | Stadium: Toyota Stadium; Attendance: 16,116; Referee: Robert Sibiga |

| March 18, 2018 2 | FC Dallas | 3–0 | Seattle Sounders FC | Frisco, Texas |
| 4:00 p.m. CDT (UTC-05) | Lamah 20', 63'; Urruti 58'; Nedyalkov (yellow card) 65' | Report | Dempsey (red card) 37'; Svensson (yellow card) 45+2'; Leerdam (yellow card) 65'; Kee-hee (yellow card) 76'; Neagle (yellow card) 89' | Stadium: Toyota Stadium; Attendance: 13,310; Referee: Chris Penso |

| March 24, 2018 3 | FC Dallas | 1–1 | Portland Timbers | Frisco, Texas |
| 2:30 p.m. CDT (UTC-05) | Hedges (yellow card) 8'; Lamah 36' (yellow card) 75' | Report | Olum (yellow card) 44' (yellow-red card) 75'; Blanco 47'; Chara (yellow card) 90+6' | Stadium: Toyota Stadium; Attendance: 13,851; Referee: Mark Geiger |

| April 7, 2018 4 | FC Dallas | 1–1 | Colorado Rapids | Frisco, Texas |
| 7:00 p.m. CDT (UTC-05) | Hedges (yellow card) 66'; Colmán 89' | Report | Badji (yellow card) 54'; Mason 62'; Price (yellow card) 68'; Blomberg (yellow card) 73'; Serna (yellow card) 90+5' | Stadium: Toyota Stadium; Attendance: 13,147; Referee: Rubiel Vazquez |

| April 14, 2018 5 | New England Revolution | 0–1 | FC Dallas | Foxboro, Massachusetts |
| 6:30 p.m. CDT (UTC-05) | | Report | Hayes 76' | Stadium: Gillette Stadium; Attendance: 11,508; Referee: Hilario Grajeda |

| April 21, 2018 6 | FC Dallas | 2–0 | Philadelphia Union | Frisco, Texas |
| 7:00 p.m. CDT (UTC-05) | Hayes (yellow card) 17'; Díaz 64' (pen.); Urruti 74' | Report | Medunjanin (yellow card) 90+2' | Stadium: Toyota Stadium; Attendance: 13,326; Referee: Alan Kelly |

| April 29, 2018 7 | New York City FC | 3–1 | FC Dallas | New York City, New York |
| 5:00 p.m. CDT (UTC-05) | Medina 3'; Villa 36' (pen.) (yellow card) 69' (goal) 69'; Herrera (yellow card) 49'; Johnson (yellow card) 58' | Report | Lamah (yellow card) 8'; Mosquera 10'; Díaz (yellow card) 76' | Stadium: Yankee Stadium; Attendance: 22,115; Referee: Ismail Elfath |

| May 5, 2018 8 | Los Angeles FC | 1–1 | FC Dallas | Los Angeles, California |
| 3:00 p.m. CDT (UTC-05) | Beitashour 9' | Report | Ulloa (yellow card) 39'; Urruti 55'; Hedges (yellow card) 89' | Stadium: Banc of California Stadium; Attendance: 22,000; Referee: Jair Marrufo |

| May 12, 2018 9 | FC Dallas | 3–2 | LA Galaxy | Frisco, Texas |
| 2:30 p.m. CDT (UTC-05) | Urruti 28' (yellow card) 87'; Lamah 44', 52'; Ziegler (yellow card) 58' (yellow-red card) 73' | Report | Cole (yellow card) 45+1'; Kamara 47'; Boateng 83'; Ciani (yellow card) 86' | Stadium: Toyota Stadium; Attendance: 18,355; Referee: José Carlos Rivero |

| May 19, 2018 10 | FC Dallas | 2–2 | Vancouver Whitecaps FC | Frisco, Texas |
| 3:00 p.m. CDT (UTC-05) | Cannon 40'; Hedges (yellow card) 47'; Díaz (yellow card) 54'; Urruti 78'; Maurer (yellow card) 90+8' | Report | Felipe (yellow card) 16'; Aja (yellow card) 68'; Figueroa 82' (o.g.); Kamara 90+10' | Stadium: Toyota Stadium; Attendance: 13,907; Referee: Ted Unkel |

| May 25, 2018 11 | Toronto FC | 0–1 | FC Dallas | Toronto, Ontario |
| 7:00 p.m. CDT (UTC-05) | Telfer (yellow card) 17'; Auro Jr. (yellow card) 61' | Report | Urruti 11' (yellow card) 90+8'; Figueroa (yellow card) 15'; Barrios (yellow card) 64'; Hedges (yellow card) 67'; González (yellow card) 80'; Díaz (yellow card) 90+6'; Gruezo (yellow card) 90+7' | Stadium: BMO Field; Attendance: 27,549; Referee: Chris Penso |

| May 30, 2018 12 | LA Galaxy | 2–3 | FC Dallas | Carson, California |
| 9:30 p.m. CDT (UTC-05) | Ibrahimovic 69', 90+7'; Boateng (yellow card) 63' | Report | Hollingshead 33'; Colmán 40' (red card) 80'; Gruezo 66'; González (yellow card) 90+2' | Stadium: StubHub Center; Attendance: 18,003; Referee: Drew Fischer |

| June 2, 2018 13 | FC Dallas | 2–1 | Los Angeles FC | Frisco, Texas |
| 7:00 p.m. CDT (UTC-05) | Ziegler 25'; Lamah 51'; Gruezo (yellow card) 70' | Report | Nguyen (yellow card) 49'; Diomande 61'; Harvey (yellow card) 72' (yellow-red card) 89' | Stadium: Toyota Stadium; Attendance: 14,022; Referee: Allen Chapman |

| June 9, 2018 14 | FC Dallas | 2–0 | Montreal Impact | Frisco, Texas |
| 7:00 p.m. CDT (UTC-05) | Mancosu 5' (o.g.); Díaz 18' (pen.); Gruezo (yellow card) 25'; González (yellow card) 90+2' | Report | Duvall (yellow card) 22'; Camacho (yellow card) 77'; Lovitz (yellow card) 90+4' | Stadium: Toyota Stadium; Attendance: 13,506; Referee: Nima Saghafi |

| June 23, 2018 15 | New York Red Bulls | 3–0 | FC Dallas | Harrison, New Jersey |
| 5:00 p.m. CDT (UTC-05) | Wright-Phillips 23'; Royer (red card) 27'; Long 39'; Lawrence 48' | Report | Ziegler (yellow card) 72' (red card) 90' | Stadium: Red Bull Arena; Attendance: 20,827; Referee: Robert Sibiga |

| June 29, 2018 16 | Minnesota United FC | 0–1 | FC Dallas | Minneapolis, Minnesota |
| 7:00 p.m. CDT (UTC-05) | Boxall (yellow card) 11'; Toye (yellow card) 89' | Report | Hedges (yellow card) 26'; Lamah 59'; Cannon (yellow card) 79' | Stadium: TCF Bank Stadium; Attendance: 22,345; Referee: Baldomero Toledo |

| July 4, 2018 17 | FC Dallas | 3–2 | Atlanta United FC | Frisco, Texas |
| 7:00 p.m. CDT (UTC-05) | Lamah (yellow card) 14'; Ziegler 22'; Akindele 86', 88' | Report | Martínez 41', 73'; Escobar (yellow card) 45' | Stadium: Toyota Stadium; Attendance: 17,298; Referee: Alan Kelly |

| July 7, 2018 18 | Real Salt Lake | 2–0 | FC Dallas | Sandy, Utah |
| 7:30 p.m. CDT (UTC-05) | Rusnák 11' (pen.); Silva 90+1' | Report | | Stadium: Rio Tinto Stadium; Attendance: 17,319; Referee: Armando Villarreal |

| July 14, 2018 19 Brimstone Cup | FC Dallas | 3–1 | Chicago Fire | Frisco, Texas |
| 7:00 p.m. CDT (UTC-05) | Gruezo 27'; Cannon (yellow card) 63'; Acosta 74'; Ziegler 81' (pen.) | Report | Conner (yellow card) 39' (yellow-red card) 70'; Bronico 86' | Stadium: Toyota Stadium; Attendance: 16,000; Referee: Marcos DeOliveira |

| July 21, 2018 20 Texas Derby | Houston Dynamo | 1–1 | FC Dallas | Houston, Texas |
| 8:00 p.m. CDT (UTC-05) | Manotas 8'; Machado (yellow card) 60' | Report | Hedges 1' | Stadium: BBVA Compass Stadium; Attendance: 19,295; Referee: Hilario Grajeda |

| July 28, 2018 21 | Sporting Kansas City | 2–3 | FC Dallas | Kansas City, Kansas |
| 8:00 p.m. CDT (UTC-05) | Opara (yellow card) 45+2'; Fernandes 50'; Espinoza (yellow card) 87'; Sallói 90+7' | Report | Gruezo (yellow card) 15'; Barrios 23', 62', 74'; Lamah (yellow card) 41'; Pedroso (yellow card) 69'; Urruti (yellow card) 90+9' | Stadium: Children's Mercy Park; Attendance: 20,758; Referee: Drew Fischer |

| August 4, 2018 22 | FC Dallas | 1–3 | San Jose Earthquakes | Frisco, Texas |
| 7:00 p.m. CDT (UTC-05) | Lamah 23' | Report | Qazaishvili 19', 88'; Hyka 47'; Kashia (yellow card) 74' | Stadium: Toyota Stadium; Attendance: 17,282; Referee: David Gantar |

| August 12, 2018 23 | Seattle Sounders FC | 2–1 | FC Dallas | Seattle, Washington |
| 7:00 p.m. CDT (UTC-05) | Marshall 41'; Svensson (yellow card) 51'; Lodeiro 63'; Kee-hee (yellow card) 78' | Report | Badji 52'; Cannon (yellow card) 80'; Ziegler (red card) 90+1' | Stadium: CenturyLink Field; Attendance: 39,522; Referee: Ted Unkel |

| August 18, 2018 24 | FC Dallas | 2–0 | Minnesota United FC | Frisco, Texas |
| 7:00 p.m. CDT (UTC-05) | Figueroa 44'; Gruezo (yellow card) 50'; Hedges (yellow card) 51'; Barrios 57' | Report | Martin (yellow card) 27'; Ibson (yellow card) 29' | Stadium: Toyota Stadium; Attendance: 15,107; Referee: Ismail Elfath |

| August 23, 2018 25 Texas Derby | Houston Dynamo | 1–1 | FC Dallas | Houston, Texas |
| 8:00 p.m. CDT (UTC-05) | García (yellow card) 58'; Cerén (yellow card) 61'; Peña 88' | Report | Gruezo (yellow card) 53'; Barrios 83'; Figueroa (yellow card) 90+2' | Stadium: BBVA Compass Stadium; Attendance: 16,544; Referee: Allen Chapman |

| August 29, 2018 26 | San Jose Earthquakes | 4–3 | FC Dallas | San Jose, California |
| 9:30 p.m. CDT (UTC-05) | Qazaishvili 16', 42'; Eriksson 54'; Wondolowski 62' | Report | Urruti 8'; Mosquera 51'; Badji 58' | Stadium: Avaya Stadium; Attendance: 15,648; Referee: Sorin Stoica |

| September 1, 2018 27 Texas Derby | FC Dallas | 4–2 | Houston Dynamo | Frisco, Texas |
| 7:00 p.m. CDT (UTC-05) | Barrios 10'; Mosquera 48', 51'; Ziegler 58' (pen.) | Report | Lundqvist (yellow card) 23'; Manotas 53'; Cerén (yellow card) 60'; Elis 72' (pen.) | Stadium: Toyota Stadium; Attendance: 16,835; Referee: Kevin Stott |

| September 15, 2018 28 Pioneer Cup | FC Dallas | 0–0 | Columbus Crew SC | Frisco, Texas |
| 7:00 p.m. CDT (UTC-05) | | Report | Clark (yellow card) 53'; Abubakar (yellow card) 67' | Stadium: Toyota Stadium; Attendance: 16,030; Referee: Hilario Grajeda |

| September 23, 2018 29 | Vancouver Whitecaps FC | 1–2 | FC Dallas | Vancouver, British Columbia |
| 6:00 p.m. CDT (UTC-05) | Teibert (yellow card) 37'; Kamara 66'; Techera (yellow card) 90' | Report | Pedroso (yellow card) 20'; Mosquera 42'; Barrios (yellow card) 75'; Hedges 87' | Stadium: BC Place; Attendance: 21,190; Referee: Alan Kelly |

| September 29, 2018 30 | Portland Timbers | 0–0 | FC Dallas | Portland, Oregon |
| 9:30 p.m. CDT (UTC-05) | Ridgewell (red card) 90+4'; Chara (yellow card) 90+7' | Report | Gruezo (yellow card) 72'; Hedges (yellow card) 75'; González (yellow card) 82' | Stadium: Providence Park; Attendance: 21,144; Referee: Allen Chapman |

| October 6, 2018 31 | FC Dallas | 2–0 | Orlando City SC | Frisco, Texas |
| 7:00 p.m. CDT (UTC-05) | Cannon (yellow card) 27'; Gruezo (yellow card) 28'; Mosquera 63'; Ulloa 69' | Report | Dwyer (yellow card) 7'; Yotún (yellow card) 35' | Stadium: Toyota Stadium; Attendance: 16,519; Referee: Nima Saghafi |

| October 13, 2018 32 | D.C. United | 1–0 | FC Dallas | Washington, D.C. |
| 2:30 p.m. CDT (UTC-05) | Canouse 86' | Report | | Stadium: Audi Field; Attendance: 19,610; Referee: José Carlos Rivero |

| October 21, 2018 33 | FC Dallas | 0–3 | Sporting Kansas City | Frisco, Texas |
| 4:00 PM CDT (UTC-05) | González (yellow card) 16'; Pedroso (yellow card) 86' | Report | Sallói 45'; Espinoza (yellow card) 45+2', (goal) 64'; Gutiérrez (yellow card) 68'; Sánchez (yellow card) 73'; Russell 87' (pen.) | Stadium: Toyota Stadium; Attendance: 19,096; Referee: Robert Sibiga |

| October 28, 2018 34 | Colorado Rapids | 2–1 | FC Dallas | Commerce City, Colorado |
| 3:30 p.m. CDT (UTC-05) | Acosta (yellow card) 64'; Boateng (yellow card) 66'; Bassett 80'; Smith 84' | Report | Urruti 18' | Stadium: Dick's Sporting Goods Park; Attendance: 15,172; Referee: Chris Penso |

=== MLS Cup Playoffs ===
==== Knockout Round ====
| October 31, 2018 | FC Dallas | 1–2 | Portland Timbers | Frisco, Texas |
| 8:30 p.m. CDT (UTC-05) | Urruti (yellow card) 22'; Gruezo (yellow card) 45+6'; Hedges 90+4' | Report | Valeri 23', 71'; Ridgewell (yellow card) 38'; Chará (yellow card) 45+6'; Mabiala (red card) 58' | Stadium: Toyota Stadium; Attendance: 10,297; Referee: Alan Kelly |

=== U.S. Open Cup ===
| June 6, 2018 Fourth round | San Antonio FC (Texas) | 0–1 | (Texas) FC Dallas | San Antonio, Texas |
| 7:30 p.m. CDT (UTC-05) | | Report | Akindele 46'; Cannon (yellow card) 52' | Stadium: Toyota Field; Attendance: 6,224; Referee: Elton García |

| June 16, 2018 Round of 16 | Sporting Kansas City | 3–2 | (Texas) FC Dallas | Kansas City, Kansas |
| 8:00 p.m. CDT (UTC-05) | Sallói 43', 66'; Amor (yellow card) 83'; Croizet 89' | Report | Gruezo 18'; Lamah (yellow card) 20', (goal) 77'; Barrios (yellow card) 37'; Hayes (yellow card) 72'; Ulloa (yellow card) 74' | Stadium: Children's Mercy Park; Attendance: 15,238; Referee: Ramy Touchan |

=== CONCACAF Champions League ===
==== Round of 16 ====
| February 21 First leg | Tauro F.C. (Panama) | 1–0 | (United States) FC Dallas | Panama City, Panama |
| 19:00 CST | Aguilar 57' | Report | | Stadium: Estadio Rommel Fernández; Referee: César Arturo Ramos |

| February 28 Second leg | FC Dallas (United States) | 3–2 (3-3^{1} agg.) | (Panama) Tauro F.C. | Frisco, United States |
| 19:00 CST | Urruti 32', (yellow card) 42'; Díaz 50' (pen.); Hedges (yellow card) 78'; Colmán 90' | Report | Aguilar 16'; González 44', (yellow card) 86'; Sánchez (yellow card) 45+' | Stadium: Toyota Stadium; Referee: Héctor Francisco Rodríguez |

1. FC Dallas eliminated on away goals

== Statistics ==
=== Appearances ===
Numbers outside parentheses denote appearances as starter.
Numbers in parentheses denote appearances as substitute.
Players with no appearances are not included in the list.

As of final match played October 31, 2018

| No. | Pos. | Nat. | Name | MLS | U.S. Open Cup | CCL | Total |
| No. | Pos. | Nat. | Name | Apps | Apps | Apps | Apps |
|---|---|---|---|---|---|---|---|
| 1 | GK | USA | Jesse González | 22 | 1 | 2 | 25 |
| 2 | DF | USA | Reggie Cannon | 34 | 2 | 2 | 38 |
| 3 | DF | SWI | Reto Ziegler | 30 | 1 | 2 | 33 |
| 6 | DF | BRA | Marquinhos Pedroso | 13 | 0 | 0 | 13 |
| 7 | MF | ECU | Carlos Gruezo | 29(3) | 1 | 2 | 32(3) |
| 8 | MF | MEX | Victor Ulloa | 26(2) | 2 | 2 | 30(2) |
| 9 | FW | PAR | Cristian Colmán | 6(9) | 1 | (1) | 7(10) |
| 10 | MF | CHI | Pablo Aránguiz | 3(6) | 0 | 0 | 3(6) |
| 11 | FW | COL | Santiago Mosquera | 18(12) | (1) | 1(1) | 19(14) |
| 12 | MF | USA | Ryan Hollingshead | 7(12) | (1) | 1(1) | 8(14) |
| 13 | FW | CAN | Tesho Akindele | 5(15) | 1(1) | (1) | 6(17) |
| 14 | GK | USA | Jimmy Maurer | 13 | 1 | 0 | 14 |
| 15 | MF | USA | Jacori Hayes | 10(6) | 1(1) | 0 | 11(7) |
| 16 | FW | SEN | Dominique Badji | 10(1) | 0 | 0 | 10(1) |
| 19 | MF | USA | Paxton Pomykal | 1(5) | 1 | 0 | 2(5) |
| 20 | MF | BEL | Roland Lamah | 21(9) | 1 | (1) | 22(10) |
| 21 | MF | COL | Michael Barrios | 30(5) | 1(1) | 2 | 33(6) |
| 22 | FW | GHA | Ema Twumasi | 1 | 1 | 0 | 2 |
| 24 | DF | USA | Matt Hedges | 34 | 2 | 2 | 38 |
| 27 | FW | COL | Jesús Ferreira | (1) | 0 | 0 | (1) |
| 31 | DF | HON | Maynor Figueroa | 12(5) | 2 | 1(1) | 15(6) |
| 32 | DF | USA | Kris Reaves | 2 | 0 | 0 | 2 |
| 34 | DF | USA | Jordan Cano | 0 | 1 | 0 | 1 |
| 37 | FW | ARG | Maximiliano Urruti | 31(3) | 1 | 2 | 34(3) |
| 44 | MF | COL | Abel Aguilar | 1(3) | 0 | 0 | 1(3) |
Player(s) exiting club mid-season that made appearance
| 6 | DF | BUL | Anton Nedyalkov | 9 | 0 | 1 | 10 |
| 10 | MF | ARG | Mauro Díaz | 9(3) | 0 | 2 | 11(3) |
| 23 | MF | USA | Kellyn Acosta | 8(5) | 1(1) | 0 | 9(6) |

=== Goals and assists ===
As of final match played October 31, 2018
Player names in italics transferred out mid-season.

| No. | Pos. | Name | MLS | | U.S. Open Cup | | CCL | | Total | |
| No. | Pos. | Name | Goals | Assists | Goals | Assists | Goals | Assists | Goals | Assists |
|---|---|---|---|---|---|---|---|---|---|---|
| 2 | DF | (United States) Reggie Cannon | 1 | 3 | 0 | 0 | 0 | 0 | 1 | 3 |
| 3 | DF | (Switzerland) Reto Ziegler | 4 | 0 | 0 | 0 | 0 | 0 | 4 | 0 |
| 6 | DF | (Bulgaria) Anton Nedyalkov | 0 | 1 | 0 | 0 | 0 | 0 | 0 | 1 |
| 7 | MF | (Ecuador) Carlos Gruezo | 2 | 1 | 1 | 0 | 0 | 0 | 3 | 1 |
| 8 | MF | (Mexico) Victor Ulloa | 1 | 2 | 0 | 0 | 0 | 0 | 1 | 2 |
| 9 | FW | (Paraguay) Cristian Colmán | 2 | 0 | 0 | 0 | 1 | 0 | 3 | 0 |
| 10 | MF | (Argentina) Mauro Díaz | 2 | 8 | 0 | 0 | 1 | 0 | 3 | 8 |
| 11 | MF | (Colombia) Santiago Mosquera | 6 | 6 | 0 | 0 | 0 | 1 | 6 | 7 |
| 12 | MF | (United States) Ryan Hollingshead | 1 | 3 | 0 | 0 | 0 | 0 | 1 | 3 |
| 13 | FW | (Canada) Tesho Akindele | 2 | 0 | 1 | 0 | 0 | 0 | 3 | 0 |
| 15 | MF | (United States) Jacori Hayes | 1 | 1 | 0 | 0 | 0 | 0 | 1 | 1 |
| 16 | FW | (Senegal) Dominique Badji | 2 | 1 | 0 | 0 | 0 | 0 | 2 | 1 |
| 20 | MF | (Belgium) Roland Lamah | 8 | 7 | 1 | 0 | 0 | 0 | 9 | 7 |
| 21 | MF | (Colombia) Michael Barrios | 6 | 6 | 0 | 2 | 0 | 0 | 6 | 8 |
| 23 | MF | (United States) Kellyn Acosta | 1 | 2 | 0 | 0 | 0 | 0 | 1 | 2 |
| 24 | DF | (United States) Matt Hedges | 3 | 0 | 0 | 0 | 0 | 0 | 3 | 0 |
| 31 | DF | (Honduras) Maynor Figueroa | 1 | 0 | 0 | 0 | 0 | 0 | 1 | 0 |
| 37 | FW | (Argentina) Maximiliano Urruti | 8 | 11 | 0 | 0 | 1 | 0 | 9 | 11 |
| | | | 2 | 0 | 0 | 0 | 0 | 0 | 2 | 0 |
| Total | | | 53 | 52 | 3 | 2 | 3 | 1 | 59 | 55 |

=== Disciplinary record ===
As of final match played October 31, 2018
Player names in italics transferred out mid-season.

| No. | Pos. | Name | MLS | | U.S. Open Cup | | CCL | | Total | |
| No. | Pos. | Name | Booked | Sent off (straight red) | Booked | Sent off (straight red) | Booked | Sent off (straight red) | Booked | Sent off (straight red) |
|---|---|---|---|---|---|---|---|---|---|---|
| 1 | GK | (United States) Jesse González | 5 | 0 | 0 | 0 | 0 | 0 | 5 | 0 |
| 2 | DF | (United States) Reggie Cannon | 4 | 0 | 1 | 0 | 0 | 0 | 5 | 0 |
| 3 | DF | (Switzerland) Reto Ziegler | 0 | 3 | 0 | 0 | 0 | 0 | 0 | 3 |
| 6 | DF | (Bulgaria) Anton Nedyalkov | 1 | 0 | 0 | 0 | 0 | 0 | 1 | 0 |
| 6 | DF | (Brazil) Marquinhos Pedroso | 3 | 0 | 0 | 0 | 0 | 0 | 3 | 0 |
| 7 | MF | (Ecuador) Carlos Gruezo | 9 | 0 | 0 | 0 | 0 | 0 | 9 | 0 |
| 8 | MF | (Mexico) Victor Ulloa | 1 | 0 | 1 | 0 | 0 | 0 | 2 | 0 |
| 9 | FW | (Paraguay) Cristian Colmán | 0 | 1 | 0 | 0 | 0 | 0 | 0 | 1 |
| 10 | MF | (Argentina) Mauro Díaz | 3 | 0 | 0 | 0 | 0 | 0 | 3 | 0 |
| 14 | GK | (United States) Jimmy Maurer | 1 | 0 | 0 | 0 | 0 | 0 | 1 | 0 |
| 15 | MF | (United States) Jacori Hayes | 2 | 0 | 1 | 0 | 0 | 0 | 3 | 0 |
| 20 | MF | (Belgium) Roland Lamah | 4 | 0 | 1 | 0 | 0 | 0 | 5 | 0 |
| 21 | MF | (Colombia) Michael Barrios | 3 | 0 | 1 | 0 | 0 | 0 | 4 | 0 |
| 24 | DF | (United States) Matt Hedges | 8 | 0 | 0 | 0 | 1 | 0 | 9 | 0 |
| 31 | DF | (Honduras) Maynor Figueroa | 2 | 0 | 0 | 0 | 0 | 0 | 2 | 0 |
| 37 | FW | (Argentina) Maximiliano Urruti | 4 | 0 | 0 | 0 | 1 | 0 | 5 | 0 |
| Total | | | 50 | 4 | 5 | 0 | 2 | 0 | 57 | 4 |

=== Goalkeeper stats ===
As of final match played October 31, 2018

| No. | Name | Total | | | | Major League Soccer | | | | U.S. Open Cup | | | | CCL | | | |
| No. | Name | MIN | GA | GAA | SV | MIN | GA | GAA | SV | MIN | GA | GAA | SV | MIN | GA | GAA | SV |
| 1 | (United States) Jesse Gonzalez | 2250 | 36 | 1.44 | 72 | 1980 | 30 | 1.36 | 65 | 90 | 3 | 3 | 5 | 180 | 3 | 1.5 | 2 |
| 14 | (United States) Jimmy Maurer | 1260 | 16 | 1.14 | 36 | 1170 | 16 | 1.23 | 33 | 90 | 0 | 0 | 3 | 0 | 0 | 0 | 0 |
| | TOTALS | 3510 | 52 | 1.33 | 108 | 3150 | 46 | 1.31 | 98 | 180 | 3 | 1.5 | 8 | 180 | 3 | 1.5 | 2 |

== Kits ==
| Primary | Primary Alt. | Secondary | Secondary Alt. | Special |

| Type | Shirt | Shorts | Socks | First appearance / Info |
|---|---|---|---|---|
| Primary | White / Red / Dark Blue sleeves | Red | Dark Blue / Red and White hoops | MLS, March 3, 2018 against Real Salt Lake |
| Primary Alternate | Red / Dark Red / White hoops | Red | Red / White hoops | CCL, February 28, 2018 against Tauro F.C. |
| Secondary | Blue / White sleeves | Blue | White / Blue hoops | MLS, April 14, 2018 against New England Revolution |
| Secondary Alternate | Blue / White sleeves | White | White / Blue hoops | CCL, February 21, 2018 against Tauro F.C. |
| Special | Gray | Gray | Gray / White hoops | MLS, April 21, 2018 against Philadelphia Union |

== See also ==
- FC Dallas
- 2018 in American soccer
- 2018 Major League Soccer season
