= 2017 FC Dallas season =

FC Dallas
2017 season
- Owner: Clark Hunt
- Head coach: Óscar Pareja
- Stadium: Toyota Stadium
- MLS: Conference: 7th Overall: 13th
- 2016–17 CCL: Semifinals
- U.S. Open Cup: Quarterfinals
- Texas Derby: Runners-up
- Brimstone Cup: Runners-up
- Top goalscorer: League: Maxi Urruti (12); All: Maxi Urruti (13)
- Highest home attendance: 16,291 (Jul. 4 vs. D.C. United)
- Lowest home attendance: 4,019 (Feb. 23 vs. Árabe Unido)
- Average home league attendance: MLS: 15,122; CCL: 6,490
| Primary colors | Secondary colors |

The 2017 FC Dallas season was the club's 22nd season in Major League Soccer, the top tier of the United States soccer league system. Competitive fixtures began in February 2017, when FC Dallas began their matches in the knockout stages of the 2016–17 CONCACAF Champions League. The club kicked off their 2017 MLS season in March. Dallas entered the season as the defending U.S. Open Cup champions and Supporters' Shield holders, as well as the defending champions for the minor rivalry trophy, the Brimstone Cup.

== Background ==
FC Dallas is coming off the most successful season in franchise history, earning two major trophies during their 2016 campaign. Last season, the Hoops won the double, by winning the Supporters' Shield for the best regular season record, as well as the 2016 U.S. Open Cup, a domestic knockout competition open to all tiers of the U.S. soccer pyramid. FC Dallas additionally participated in the group stages of the 2016–17 CONCACAF Champions League where they finished atop their group over Guatemalan outfit, Suchitepéquez, and Nicaraguan outfit, Real Estelí. Argentine forward Maximiliano Urruti led Dallas in 2016 with 10 goals in league play and 13 goals across all competitions.

== Transfers ==
=== In ===
| No. | Pos. | Nat. | Name | Age | Moving from | Type | Transfer window | Ends | Transfer fee | Source |
|---|---|---|---|---|---|---|---|---|---|---|
| 27 | FW | (United States) | Jesús Ferreira | 16 | FC Dallas Academy (United States) | Transfer | Pre-season | Undisclosed | HGP contract | |
| 22 | DF | (United States) | Reggie Cannon | 18 | UCLA Bruins (United States) | Transfer | Pre-season | Undisclosed | HGP contract | |
| 29 | FW | (United States) | Bryan Reynolds | 15 | FC Dallas Academy (United States) | Transfer | Pre-season | Undisclosed | HGP contract | |
| 11 | MF | (Argentina) | Javier Morales | 37 | Real Salt Lake (United States) | Transfer | Pre-season | Undisclosed | Free | |
| 20 | MF | (Belgium) | Roland Lamah | 29 | Ferencváros (Hungary) | Transfer | Pre-season | Undisclosed | Free | |
| 6 | DF | (Ecuador) | Aníbal Chalá | 20 | El Nacional (Ecuador) | Transfer | Pre-season | Undisclosed | Undisclosed | |
| 9 | FW | (Paraguay) | Cristian Colmán | 22 | Nacional (Paraguay) | Transfer | Pre-season | Undisclosed | Undisclosed | |
| 5 | MF | (Venezuela) | Carlos Cermeño | 21 | Táchira (Venezuela) | Transfer | Pre-season | Undisclosed | Undisclosed | |
| 2 | MF | (Argentina) | Hernán Grana | 31 | All Boys (Argentina) | Transfer | Pre-season | Undisclosed | Undisclosed | |
| 15 | MF | (United States) | Jacori Hayes | 21 | Wake Forest Demon Deacons (United States) | Signed draft pick | Pre-season | Undisclosed | Undisclosed | |
| 28 | FW | (Canada) | Adonijah Reid | 17 | ANB Futbol Academy (Canada) | Signed draft pick | Pre-season | Undisclosed | Undisclosed | |
| 26 | DF | (United States) | Walker Hume | 23 | North Carolina Tar Heels (United States) | Signed draft pick | Pre-season | Undisclosed | Undisclosed | |
| 17 | MF | (Venezuela) | Luis González | 26 | Monagas SC (Venezuela) | Transfer | Mid-season | Undisclosed | Undisclosed | |

==== Draft picks ====
| Round | Selection | Pos. | Name | College | Signed | Source |
|---|---|---|---|---|---|---|
| 1 | 18 | MF | (United States) Jacori Hayes | Wake Forest | Signed to first-team | |
| 2 | 37 | DF | (United States) Walker Hume | North Carolina | Signed to first-team | |
| 2 | 40 | FW | (Canada) Adonijah Reid | ANB Futbol Academy | Signed to first-team | |
| 3 | 53 | DF | (United States) Austin Ledbetter | SIU Edwardsville | Not signed, signed with Saint Louis FC | |
| 3 | 59 | MF | (United States) Dakota Barnathan | VCU | Not signed, signed with Swope Park Rangers | |
| 3 | 62 | FW | (Cape Verde) Wuilito Fernandes | UMass Lowell | Not signed, signed with Orange County SC | |
| 4 | 84 | MF | (United States) Marco Carrizales | Furman | | |

=== Out ===
| No. | Pos. | Nat. | Name | Age | Moving to | Type | Transfer window | Transfer fee | Source |
|---|---|---|---|---|---|---|---|---|---|
| 2 | DF | (Trinidad and Tobago) | Aubrey David | 26 | Saprissa (Costa Rica) | End of loan | Pre-season | Free | |
| 22 | FW | (Colombia) | Carlos Lizarazo | 25 | Cruz Azul (Mexico) | End of loan | Pre-season | Free | |
| 9 | FW | (Brazil) | Getterson | 25 | J. Malucelli (Brazil) | End of loan | Pre-season | Free | |
| 20 | MF | (Colombia) | Juan Esteban Ortiz | 29 | Rionegro Águilas (Colombia) | Option Declined | Pre-season | Free | |
| 77 | MF | (Argentina) | Mauro Rosales | 35 | Vancouver Whitecaps FC (Canada) | Option Declined | Pre-season | Free | |
| 5 | DF | (Argentina) | Norberto Paparatto | 33 | Club Almagro (Argentina) | Option Declined | Pre-season | Free | |
| 30 | GK | (United States) | Ryan Herman | 23 | Miami FC (United States) | Option Declined | Pre-season | Free | |
| 29 | FW | (Guatemala) | Carlos Ruiz | 37 | None | Retired | Pre-season | Free | |
| 17 | DF | (United States) | Zach Loyd | 29 | Atlanta United FC (United States) | Drafted | Pre-season | Expansion draft | |
| 11 | MF | (Colombia) | Fabián Castillo | 24 | Trabzonspor (Turkey) | Transfer | Pre-season | Undisclosed | |
| 3 | DF | (Guatemala) | Moises Hernandez | 24 | Comunicaciones (Guatemala) | Mutual Termination | Pre-season | Free | |
| 28 | FW | (United States) | Colin Bonner | 22 | None | Retired | Pre-season | Free | |
| 15 | MF | (Germany) | Timo Pitter | 24 | None | Retired | Pre-season | Free | |

=== Roster ===
As of August 9, 2017. Note: Flags indicate national team as defined under FIFA eligibility rules; some limited exceptions apply. Players may hold more than one non-FIFA nationality.

| No. | Pos. | Nation | Player |
|---|---|---|---|
| 1 | GK | USA | Jesse Gonzalez (HGP) |
| 2 | DF | ARG | Hernán Grana (on loan from All Boys) |
| 5 | MF | VEN | Carlos Cermeño (on loan from Deportivo Táchira) |
| 7 | MF | ECU | Carlos Gruezo (DP) |
| 8 | MF | USA | Victor Ulloa (HGP) |
| 9 | FW | PAR | Cristian Colmán (DP) |
| 10 | MF | ARG | Mauro Díaz (DP) |
| 11 | MF | ARG | Javier Morales |
| 12 | MF | USA | Ryan Hollingshead |
| 13 | FW | CAN | Tesho Akindele |
| 14 | DF | SKN | Atiba Harris |
| 16 | FW | USA | Coy Craft (HGP) |
| 17 | MF | VEN | Luis González (on loan from Monagas SC) |

| No. | Pos. | Nation | Player |
|---|---|---|---|
| 18 | GK | USA | Chris Seitz |
| 19 | MF | USA | Paxton Pomykal (HGP) |
| 20 | MF | BEL | Roland Lamah |
| 21 | MF | COL | Michael Barrios |
| 22 | DF | USA | Reggie Cannon (HGP) |
| 23 | MF | USA | Kellyn Acosta (HGP) |
| 24 | DF | USA | Matt Hedges |
| 25 | DF | USA | Walker Zimmerman |
| 26 | DF | USA | Walker Hume |
| 27 | FW | USA | Jesús Ferreira (HGP) |
| 29 | FW | USA | Bryan Reynolds (HGP) |
| 31 | DF | HON | Maynor Figueroa |
| 37 | FW | ARG | Maximiliano Urruti |

=== Out on loan ===
Note: Flags indicate national team as defined under FIFA eligibility rules; some limited exceptions apply. Players may hold more than one non-FIFA nationality.

| No. | Pos. | Nation | Player |
|---|---|---|---|
| 6 | DF | ECU | Aníbal Chalá (on loan to LDU Quito) |
| 15 | MF | USA | Jacori Hayes (on loan to Tulsa Roughnecks) |
| 28 | FW | CAN | Adonijah Reid (on loan to Ottawa Fury) |
| 33 | DF | MEX | Aaron Guillen (on loan to Tulsa Roughnecks) |

== Competitions ==
=== Match results ===
Win Draw Loss Canceled

=== Preseason ===
| February 8 | Lanús | 1–0 | FC Dallas | Lanús, Argentina |
| TBD CST | 110' | Report | | Stadium: Estadio Ciudad de Lanús – Néstor Díaz Pérez; Attendance: Closed-door |
Note: Three 40-minute periods.

| February 9 | River Plate | 1–1 | FC Dallas | Ezeiza, Argentina |
| TBD CST | Rossi 22' | Report | Reid 59' | Stadium: River Plate Training Facility |

| February 10 | San Lorenzo | 3–3 | FC Dallas | Buenos Aires, Argentina |
| TBD CST | Corujo 21'; Romagnoli 34'; 63' | Report | 18' (o.g.); Barrios 51'; Urruti 74' | Stadium: Estadio Pedro Bidegain |

| February 11 | Racing | 1–1 | FC Dallas | Buenos Aires, Argentina |
| 6:00CST | González 8' | Report | Akindele 52' | Stadium: Estadio Presidente Juan Domingo Perón |
Note: 70-minute match.

| February 11 | Racing | 1–1 | FC Dallas | Buenos Aires, Argentina |
| TBD CST | Guille | Report | Akindele 33' | Stadium: Estadio Presidente Juan Domingo Perón |
Note: 70-minute match.

| February 12 | River Plate Reserves | 1–2 | FC Dallas | Ezeiza, Argentina |
| TBD CST | 20' | Report | Ferreira 43'; Hume | Stadium: River Plate Training Grounds |
Note: 75-minute match.

| February 13 | Ferro | canceled | FC Dallas | Buenos Aires, Argentina |
| TBD CST | | Cancellation | | Stadium: Estadio Arquitecto Ricardo Etcheverry |
Note: Canceled due to bad weather

| February 14 | Lanús | 1–1 | FC Dallas | Lanús, Argentina |
| TBD CST | Silva 7' | Report | Harris 35' | Stadium: Estadio Ciudad de Lanús – Néstor Díaz Pérez |
Note: Two 25-minute halves.

| February 14 | Lanús Reserves | 2–0 | FC Dallas Reserves | Lanús, Argentina |
| TBD CST | Chalá 39' (o.g.); 43' (pen.) | Report | | Stadium: Estadio Ciudad de Lanús – Néstor Díaz Pérez |
Note: Two 25-minute halves.

| February 15 | Estudiantes de La Plata | 1–1 | FC Dallas | La Plata, Argentina |
| TBD CST | Vargas 22' | Report | Colmán 33' (pen.) |

| February 19 | FC Dallas | 2–0 | SMU Mustangs | Frisco, Texas |
| 9:00 CST | Pomykal 25', 43' | Report | | Stadium: Toyota Soccer Center Field #4; Attendance: 150 |

=== Midseason ===
| March 19 | FC Dallas | 2–1 | San Antonio FC | Frisco, Texas |
| 10:00 CST | Barrios 8'; Akindele 28' | Report | Hassan 65' | Stadium: Toyota Soccer Center Field #1 |

=== Major League Soccer ===
==== Western Conference standings ====
Western Conference

| Pos | Team | Pld | W | L | T | GF | GA | GD | Pts | Qualification |
|---|---|---|---|---|---|---|---|---|---|---|
| 5 | Sporting Kansas City | 34 | 12 | 9 | 13 | 40 | 29 | +11 | 49 | MLS Cup Knockout Round |
| 6 | San Jose Earthquakes | 34 | 13 | 14 | 7 | 39 | 60 | −21 | 46 | MLS Cup Knockout Round |
| 7 | FC Dallas | 34 | 11 | 10 | 13 | 48 | 48 | 0 | 46 | |
| 8 | Real Salt Lake | 34 | 13 | 15 | 6 | 48 | 56 | −8 | 45 | |
| 9 | Minnesota United FC | 34 | 10 | 18 | 6 | 47 | 70 | −23 | 36 | |

Source: MLS

==== Overall standings ====
| Pos | Team | Pld | W | L | T | GF | GA | GD | Pts | Qualification |
|---|---|---|---|---|---|---|---|---|---|---|
| 11 | Sporting Kansas City | 34 | 12 | 9 | 13 | 40 | 29 | +11 | 49 | CONCACAF Champions League |
| 12 | San Jose Earthquakes | 34 | 13 | 14 | 7 | 39 | 60 | −21 | 46 | |
| 13 | FC Dallas | 34 | 11 | 10 | 13 | 48 | 48 | 0 | 46 | |
| 14 | Real Salt Lake | 34 | 13 | 15 | 6 | 49 | 55 | −6 | 45 | |
| 15 | New England Revolution | 34 | 13 | 15 | 6 | 53 | 61 | −8 | 45 | |

Source: MLS
Rules for classification: 1) points; 2) total wins; 3) total goal differential; 4) total goals scored; 5) disciplinary points; 6) away goals scored; 7) away goal differential; 8) coin toss or drawing of lots

==== Results summary ====
| Overall | | | | | | | | Home | | | | | | Away | | | | | |
| Pld | W | D | L | GF | GA | GD | Pts | W | D | L | GF | GA | GD | W | D | L | GF | GA | GD |
|---|---|---|---|---|---|---|---|---|---|---|---|---|---|---|---|---|---|---|---|
| 34 | 11 | 13 | 10 | 48 | 48 | 0 | 46 | 8 | 7 | 2 | 33 | 20 | +13 | 3 | 6 | 8 | 15 | 28 | −13 |

Last updated: October 22, 2017.
Source: Regular Season

==== Results by round ====
| Round | 1 | 2 | 3 | 4 | 5 | 6 | 7 | 8 | 9 | 10 | 11 | 12 | 13 | 14 | 15 | 16 | 17 | 18 | 19 | 20 | 21 | 22 | 23 | 24 | 25 | 26 | 27 | 28 | 29 | 30 | 31 | 32 | 33 | 34 |
|---|---|---|---|---|---|---|---|---|---|---|---|---|---|---|---|---|---|---|---|---|---|---|---|---|---|---|---|---|---|---|---|---|---|---|
| Stadium | A | A | H | H | A | H | H | A | H | H | A | H | H | A | A | A | H | H | A | H | A | H | A | H | A | H | A | H | A | H | A | A | A | H |
| Result | W | D | W | W | D | W | D | W | D | L | L | D | W | L | D | D | W | W | W | L | L | D | L | D | L | D | L | D | L | W | D | D | L | W |

Updated to match(es) played on October 22, 2017. Source: Regular Season
A = Away; H = Home; W = Win; D = Draw; L = Loss

==== Regular season ====
Kickoff times are in CDT (UTC-05) unless shown otherwise

| March 4, 2017 1 | LA Galaxy | 1–2 | FC Dallas | Carson, California |
| 3:00PM CST (UTC-06) | Jones (yellow card) 17'; Pedro (yellow card) 41' dos Santos 53' (pen.) | Report | Urruti 47'; Acosta 69'; Figueroa (yellow card) 83'; Hedges (yellow card) 85' | Stadium: StubHub Center; Attendance: 23,554; Referee: Kevin Stott |

| March 11, 2017 2 | Sporting Kansas City | 0–0 | FC Dallas | Kansas City, Kansas |
| 8:00PM CST (UTC-06) | Sinovic (yellow card) 79'; Dwyer (yellow card) 81'; Fernandes (yellow card) 90+5' | Report | Guillen (yellow card) 4'; Figueroa (yellow card) 29'; Harris (yellow card) 69'; Gruezo (yellow card) 86'; Cermeño (yellow card) 90+2' | Stadium: Children's Mercy Park; Attendance: 19,117; Referee: Sorin Stoica |

| March 18, 2017 3 | FC Dallas | 2–1 | New England Revolution | Frisco, Texas |
| 7:00PM CDT (UTC-05) | Lamah (yellow card) 37'; Figueroa (yellow card) 54'; Urruti 71', 77'; Barrios (yellow card) 89' | Report | Nguyen 10' (pen.); Agudelo (yellow card) 73' | Stadium: Toyota Stadium; Attendance: 16,150; Referee: Alan Kelly |

| April 8, 2017 4 | FC Dallas | 2–0 | Minnesota United FC | Frisco, Texas |
| 7:00PM CDT (UTC-05) | Gruezo (yellow card) 30'; Morales 43'; Barrios 49'; Gonzalez (yellow card) 88'; Grana (yellow card) 89' | Report | Warner (yellow card) 5'; Ibson (yellow card) 61'; Kallman (yellow card) 72' | Stadium: Toyota Stadium; Attendance: 16,048; Referee: Chris Penso |

| April 14, 2017 5 | San Jose Earthquakes | 1–1 | FC Dallas | San Jose, California |
| 10:00PM CDT (UTC-05) | Alashe (yellow card) 83'; Hyka 90+4' | Report | Acosta 78'; Harris (yellow card) 90+2'; Gonzalez (yellow card) 90+3' | Stadium: Avaya Stadium; Attendance: 18,000; Referee: Armando Villarreal |

| April 22, 2017 6 | FC Dallas | 1–0 | Sporting Kansas City | Frisco, Texas |
| 7:00PM CDT (UTC-05) | Figueroa 77' | Report | | Stadium: Toyota Stadium; Attendance: 15,411; Referee: Kevin Stott |

| April 29, 2017 7 | FC Dallas | 2–2 | Portland Timbers | Frisco, Texas |
| 7:00PM CDT (UTC-05) | Figueroa (yellow card) 37'; Urruti 61'; Grana (yellow card) 73'; Akindele 80' | Report | Adi 30'; Andriuskevicius (yellow card) 34'; Blanco 71' | Stadium: Toyota Stadium; Attendance: 16,014; Referee: Baldomero Toledo |

| May 6, 2017 8 | Real Salt Lake | 0–3 | FC Dallas | Sandy, Utah |
| 8:30PM CDT (UTC-05) | | Report | Urruti 3' (pen.) (yellow card) 57' (goal) 90+1'; Hedges 67'; Colmán (yellow card) 79' | Stadium: Rio Tinto Stadium; Attendance: 18,160; Referee: Drew Fischer |

| May 14, 2017 9 | FC Dallas | 1–1 | New York City FC | Frisco, Texas |
| 7:00PM CDT (UTC-05) | Acosta 20'; Gruezo (yellow card) 68' | Report | McNamara (yellow card) 34' (goal) 68'; Ring (yellow card) 51'; Sweat (yellow card) 88' | Stadium: Toyota Stadium; Attendance: 14,665; Referee: Robert Sibiga |

| May 20, 2017 10 | FC Dallas | 0–1 | San Jose Earthquakes | Frisco, Texas |
| 7:00PM CDT (UTC-05) | Gruezo (yellow card) 70' | Report | Hyka 81' | Stadium: Toyota Stadium; Attendance: 14,200; Referee: Ismail Elfath |

| May 25, 2017 11 Brimstone Cup | Chicago Fire | 2–1 | FC Dallas | Bridgeview, Illinois |
| 7:30PM CDT (UTC-05) | Nikolić 3'; Accam 9'; Solignac (yellow card) 18'; Kappelhof (yellow card) 82' | Report | Lamah 6'; Gruezo (yellow card) 21'; Guillen (yellow card) 23'; Hume (yellow card) 45'; Hedges (yellow card) 70' | Stadium: Toyota Park; Attendance: 12,584; Referee: Jose Carlos Rivero |

| May 28, 2017 12 Texas Derby | FC Dallas | 0–0 | Houston Dynamo | Frisco, Texas |
| 7:00PM CDT (UTC-05) | | Report | Clark (yellow card) 17'; Cabezas (yellow card) 83'; Deric (yellow card) 90+3' | Stadium: Toyota Stadium; Attendance: 15,055; Referee: Jair Marrufo |

| June 3, 2017 13 | FC Dallas | 6–2 | Real Salt Lake | Frisco, Texas |
| 7:00PM CDT (UTC-05) | Lamah 8', 22', 31'; Urruti 39'; Akindele 43'; Ferreira 89' | Report | Beltran (yellow card) 42'; Holness 70'; Beckerman 72' | Stadium: Toyota Stadium; Attendance: 14,016; Referee: Nima Saghafi |
Note: In this game, FC Dallas became the first MLS team ever to have a 5–0 lead at halftime. Roland Lamah scores the fastest hat-trick in franchise history (31 minutes).

| June 10, 2017 14 | Portland Timbers | 2–0 | FC Dallas | Portland, Oregon |
| 9:30PM CDT (UTC-05) | Adi 32', 72'; Andriuskevicius (yellow card) 24'; Asprilla (yellow card) 54' | Report | Barrios (yellow card) 10' | Stadium: Providence Park; Attendance: 21,144; Referee: Chris Penso |

| June 17, 2017 15 | Vancouver Whitecaps FC | 1–1 | FC Dallas | Vancouver, British Columbia |
| 9:00PM CDT (UTC-05) | Laba (yellow card) 49'; Techera 74' | Report | Urruti 52'; Harris (yellow card) 90+1' | Stadium: BC Place; Attendance: 22,120; Referee: Alan Kelly |

| June 23, 2017 16 Texas Derby | Houston Dynamo | 1–1 | FC Dallas | Houston, Texas |
| 8:00PM CDT (UTC-05) | Torres 19' (yellow card) 84'; Alex (yellow card) 80' | Report | Harris (yellow card) 55'; Urruti 59'; Grana (yellow card) 80' | Stadium: BBVA Compass Stadium; Attendance: 22,115; Referee: Kevin Stott |

| July 1, 2017 17 | FC Dallas | 3–1 | Toronto FC | Frisco, Texas |
| 6:00PM CDT (UTC-05) | Lamah 5', 21' (yellow card) 15'; Harris (yellow card) 39'; Grana (yellow card) 54'; Figueroa (yellow card) 60'; Gruezo (yellow card) 76'; Urruti 78'; Akindele (yellow card) 90+2' | Report | Zavaleta (yellow card) 49'; Delgado 56' | Stadium: Toyota Stadium; Attendance: 14,984; Referee: Ricardo Salazar |

| July 4, 2017 18 | FC Dallas | 4–2 | D.C. United | Frisco, Texas |
| 7:30PM CDT (UTC-05) | Harris 41'; Grana (yellow card) 43'; Lamah 45+3', 55'; Urruti 47' | Report | Harkes 30'; Jeffrey (yellow card) 49'; Brown 57' | Stadium: Toyota Stadium; Attendance: 16,291; Referee: David Gantar |

| July 22, 2017 19 | Montreal Impact | 1–2 | FC Dallas | Montreal, Quebec |
| 6:30PM CDT (UTC-05) | Salazar 23'; Mancosu (yellow card) 43' | Report | Figueroa (yellow card) 44'; Colmán 52', 62'; Grana (yellow card) 55'; Ulloa (yellow card) 66' | Stadium: Saputo Stadium; Attendance: 20,481; Referee: Robert Sibiga |

| July 29, 2017 20 | FC Dallas | 0–4 | Vancouver Whitecaps FC | Frisco, Texas |
| 7:00PM CDT (UTC-05) | Gruezo (red card) 59'; Harris (yellow card) 89' | Report | Ibini-Isei 18'; Montero 49' (pen.) 67'; Reyna (yellow card) 79'; Mezquida 83' | Stadium: Toyota Stadium; Attendance: 15,274; Referee: Baldomero Toledo |

| August 5, 2017 21 | Philadelphia Union | 3–1 | FC Dallas | Chester, Pennsylvania |
| 6:00PM CDT (UTC-05) | Sapong 17', 68'; Ilsinho (yellow card) 64' (goal) 68' | Report | Cermeño (yellow card) 45+1'; Hedges (yellow card) 55'; Barrios 90+2' | Stadium: Talen Energy Stadium; Attendance: 17,880; Referee: Ricardo Salazar |

| August 12, 2017 22 | FC Dallas | 0–0 | Colorado Rapids | Frisco, Texas |
| 7:00PM CDT (UTC-05) | Acosta (yellow card) 16'; Hedges (yellow card) 37' | Report | Azira (yellow card) 40' da Fonte (yellow card) 57'; Doyle (yellow card) 86'; Watts (yellow card) 86' | Stadium: Toyota Stadium; Attendance: 14,522; Referee: Alan Kelly |

| August 19, 2017 23 | Sporting Kansas City | 2–0 | FC Dallas | Kansas City, Kansas |
| 7:30PM CDT (UTC-05) | Rubio 42'; Sánchez (yellow card) 48'; Fernandes 90+2' | Report | Figueroa (yellow card) 80' | Stadium: Children's Mercy Park; Attendance: 19,869; Referee: Armando Villarreal |

| August 23, 2017 24 Texas Derby | FC Dallas | 3–3 | Houston Dynamo | Frisco, Texas |
| 8:00PM CDT (UTC-05) | Akindele 45' (yellow card) 53'; Grana (yellow card) 45+1'; Figueroa 45+2'; Urruti 51'; Barrios (yellow card) 63' | Report | Sánchez 1'; García (yellow card) 25'; Torres (yellow card) 25' (goal) 71', 86'; Garcia (yellow card) 80'; Manotas (yellow card) 90' | Stadium: Toyota Stadium; Attendance: 13,339; Referee: Baldomero Toledo |

| August 26, 2017 25 Pioneer Cup | Columbus Crew SC | 2–1 | FC Dallas | Columbus, Ohio |
| 6:30PM CDT (UTC-05) | Kamara 50'; Mensah 71' | Report | Akindele (yellow card) 70'; Zimmerman 78'; Hedges (yellow card) 90+3' | Stadium: Mapfre Stadium; Attendance: 18,379; Referee: Allen Chapman |

| September 2, 2017 26 | FC Dallas | 2–2 | New York Red Bulls | Frisco, Texas |
| 8:00PM CDT (UTC-05) | Hayes (red card) 37'; Grana 54'; Díaz 75' (pen.) | Report | Zizzo (yellow card) 6'; Kljestan 43'; Long 57'; Davis (yellow card) 65' | Stadium: Toyota Stadium; Attendance: 16,035; Referee: Kevin Stott |

| September 10, 2017 27 | Atlanta United FC | 3–0 | FC Dallas | Atlanta, Georgia |
| 2:30PM CDT (UTC-05) | González Pirez 14' (yellow card) 50'; Martínez 46'; Garza 68' | Report | Gruezo (yellow card) 2' | Stadium: Mercedes-Benz Stadium; Attendance: 45,314; Referee: Mark Geiger |
Note: First game at the new Atlanta United FC stadium.

| September 16, 2017 28 | FC Dallas | 0–0 | Seattle Sounders FC | Frisco, Texas |
| 7:00PM CDT (UTC-05) | Hedges (yellow card) 53' | Report | Dempsey (yellow card) 60'; Leerdam (yellow card) 67'; Lodeiro (yellow card) 89'; Neagle (yellow card) 90+4' | Stadium: Toyota Stadium; Attendance: 15,124; Referee: Hilario Grajeda |

| September 23, 2017 29 | Minnesota United FC | 4–1 | FC Dallas | Minneapolis, Minnesota |
| 7:00PM CDT (UTC-05) | Ramirez 24'; Ibarra 35'; Calvo (yellow card) 40'; Finlay (yellow card) 42' (goal) 71'; Martin (yellow card) 58'; Danladi 81' | Report | Akindele 14' (red card) 81'; Barrios (yellow card) 75'; Grana (yellow card) 78' | Stadium: TCF Bank Stadium; Attendance: 22,055; Referee: Alex Chilowicz |

| September 27, 2017 30 | FC Dallas | 2–0 | Colorado Rapids | Frisco, Texas |
| 7:00PM CDT (UTC-05) | Figueroa 6'; Lamah 9'; Hedges (yellow card) 23'; Gonzalez (yellow card) 84' | Report | Burling (yellow card) 12'; Aigner (yellow card) 44'; Saeid (yellow card) 45+1' | Stadium: Toyota Stadium; Attendance: 14,566; Referee: Ricardo Salazar |

| September 30, 2017 31 | Orlando City SC | 0–0 | FC Dallas | Orlando, Florida |
| 3:00PM CDT (UTC-05) | | Report | Barrios (yellow card) 90+2' | Stadium: Orlando City Stadium; Attendance: 24,007; Referee: Armando Villarreal |

| October 7, 2017 32 | Colorado Rapids | 1–1 | FC Dallas | Commerce City, Colorado |
| 8:00PM CDT (UTC-05) | Aigner 15'; Boateng (yellow card) 22'; Badji (yellow card) 68' | Report | Harris 54' (yellow card) 69' | Stadium: Dick's Sporting Goods Park; Attendance: 16,598; Referee: Silviu Petrescu |

| October 15, 2017 33 | Seattle Sounders FC | 4–0 | FC Dallas | Seattle, Washington |
| 4:00PM CDT (UTC-05) | Rodríguez 31'; Bruin 64', 67'; Neagle 90+2' | Report | Morales (yellow card) 8' | Stadium: CenturyLink Field; Attendance: 48,478; Referee: Drew Fischer |

| October 22, 2017 34 | FC Dallas | 5–1 | LA Galaxy | Frisco, Texas |
| 3:00PM CDT (UTC-05) | Lamah 37', 49'; Hedges 41'; Barrios 68'; Díaz 73' (pen.); Acosta (yellow card) 84' | Report | Ciani 2' (yellow card) 65'; Diop (red card) 71' | Stadium: Toyota Stadium; Attendance: 15,383; Referee: José Carlos Rivero |

=== U.S. Open Cup ===
| June 14, 2017 Fourth round | FC Dallas (Texas) | 2–1 | (Oklahoma) Tulsa Roughnecks FC | University Park, Texas |
| 7:00 PM CDT | Craft 31'; Akindele (yellow card) 81'; Jadama 90+2' (o.g.) | Report | Caffa (yellow card) 56'; Kimura 59'; Corrales (yellow card) 63' | Stadium: Westcott Field; Attendance: 2,214; Referee: Fotis Bazakos (Minnesota) |

| June 27, 2017 Round of 16 | FC Dallas (Texas) | 3–1 | Colorado Rapids | Frisco, Texas |
| 7:00 PM CDT | Pomykal (yellow card) 16'; Diaz 45' (pen.); Hollingshead 57'; Morales 89' | Report | Ford (yellow card) 27' (yellow-red card) 88'; Hamilton (yellow card) 45+1'; Azira 46' | Stadium: Toyota Stadium; Attendance: 4,131; Referee: Robert Sibiga (New York (state)) |

| July 11, 2017 Quarterfinals | Sporting Kansas City | 3–0 (a.e.t.) | (Texas) FC Dallas | Kansas City, Kansas |
| 7:30 PM CDT | Sinovic (red card) 15'; Espinoza (yellow card) 45+3'; Medranda (yellow card) 65'; Blessing 105+3', 105+8'; Sallói 118' | Report | Victor Ulloa (yellow card) 45+2'; Diaz (yellow card) 62'; Urruti (red card) 101'; Morales (red card) 105+5'; Harris (yellow card) 120' | Stadium: Children's Mercy Park; Attendance: 15,016; Referee: Younes Marrakchi (Colorado) |

=== CONCACAF Champions League (2016–17) ===
==== Group stage ====
FC Dallas' group stage matches during the 2016–17 Champions League were played during the 2016 regular season.

| Pos | Team | Pld | W | D | L | GF | GA | GD | Pts | Qualification |
|---|---|---|---|---|---|---|---|---|---|---|
| 1 | (United States) FC Dallas | 4 | 2 | 2 | 0 | 8 | 4 | +4 | 8 | Quarter-finals |
| 2 | (Guatemala) Suchitepéquez | 4 | 1 | 2 | 1 | 4 | 6 | −2 | 5 | |
| 3 | (Nicaragua) Real Estelí | 4 | 0 | 2 | 2 | 3 | 5 | −2 | 2 | |

Source: CONCACAF
Rules for classification: Group stage tiebreakers

==== Knockout stage ====
===== Quarterfinals =====
| February 23, 2017 First leg | FC Dallas (United States) | 4–0 | (Panama) Árabe Unido | Frisco, United States |
| 19:00 CST | Colmán 30'; Acosta 55', 86'; Figueroa (yellow card) 58'; Barrios 90+1' | Report | Caesar (yellow card) 17'; Addles (yellow card) 28'; Henríquez (yellow card) 49' | Stadium: Toyota Stadium; Attendance: 4,019; Referee: Ricardo Montero (Costa Rica) |

| March 1, 2017 Second leg | Árabe Unido (Panama) | 2–1 (2–5 agg.) | (United States) FC Dallas | Panama City, Panama |
| 20:00 CST | González (yellow card) 18'; Addles (yellow card) 85'; Chen 90'; Heraldez 90+2' | Report | Heraldez 23' (o.g.); Seitz (yellow card) 28'; Hedges (yellow card) 35'; Acosta (yellow card) 61' | Stadium: Estadio Maracaná; Referee: Joel Aguilar (El Salvador) |

===== Semifinals =====
| March 15, 2017 First leg | FC Dallas (United States) | 2–1 | (Mexico) Pachuca | Frisco, United States |
| 19:00 CST | Hedges (yellow card) 33'; Urruti 44'; Grana (yellow card) 45'; Acosta 58'; Gruezo (yellow card) 62' | Report | Jara 3'; Medina (yellow card) 35'; Murillo (yellow card) 57'; Hernández (yellow card) 89' | Stadium: Toyota Stadium; Attendance: 8,961; Referee: John Pitti (Panama) |

| April 4, 2017 Second leg | Pachuca (Mexico) | 3–1 (4–3 agg.) | (United States) FC Dallas | Pachuca, Mexico |
| 21:00 CDT | Jara 38'; Lozano 80', 90+2' | Report | Zimmerman (yellow card) 63'; Colmán 86'; Hedges (yellow card) 88' | Stadium: Estadio Hidalgo; Referee: Melvin Matamoros (Honduras) |

=== CONCACAF Champions League (2018) ===
FC Dallas will not play Champions League fixtures until the 2018 season.

== Statistics ==
=== Appearances ===
Numbers outside parentheses denote appearances as starter.
Numbers in parentheses denote appearances as substitute.
Players with no appearances are not included in the list.

As of final match played October 22, 2017

| No. | Pos. | Nat. | Name | MLS | U.S. Open Cup | CCL | Total |
| No. | Pos. | Nat. | Name | Apps | Apps | Apps | Apps |
|---|---|---|---|---|---|---|---|
| 1 | GK | USA | Jesse Gonzalez | 29 | 1 | 0 | 30 |
| 2 | DF | ARG | Hernán Grana | 30 | 1 | 4 | 35 |
| 5 | DF | VEN | Carlos Cermeño | 3(5) | 1(1) | 0 | 4(6) |
| 7 | MF | ECU | Carlos Gruezo | 30(1) | 1 | 4 | 35(1) |
| 8 | MF | USA | Victor Ulloa | 12(10) | 3 | 0 | 15(10) |
| 9 | FW | PAR | Cristian Colmán | 9(15) | 2(1) | 3(1) | 14(17) |
| 10 | MF | ARG | Mauro Diaz | 13(6) | 3 | 0 | 16(6) |
| 11 | FW | ARG | Javier Morales | 8(7) | 1(2) | 1(2) | 10(11) |
| 12 | MF | USA | Ryan Hollingshead | 9(9) | 3 | 0 | 12(9) |
| 13 | FW | CAN | Tesho Akindele | 15(13) | (3) | 1(3) | 16(19) |
| 14 | DF | SKN | Atiba Harris | 21(8) | 1 | (4) | 22(12) |
| 15 | MF | USA | Jacori Hayes | 2(1) | 0 | 0 | 2(1) |
| 16 | FW | USA | Coy Craft | (1) | 1 | 0 | 1(1) |
| 17 | MF | VEN | Luis González | (2) | 0 | 0 | (2) |
| 18 | GK | USA | Chris Seitz | 5 | 2 | 4 | 11 |
| 19 | MF | USA | Paxton Pomykal | 2 | 2 | (1) | 4(1) |
| 20 | MF | BEL | Roland Lamah | 30(3) | 2 | 3 | 35(3) |
| 21 | MF | COL | Michael Barrios | 28(6) | 1(2) | 4 | 33(8) |
| 22 | DF | USA | Reggie Cannon | (1) | 2 | 0 | 2(1) |
| 23 | DF | USA | Kellyn Acosta | 20(3) | 0 | 4 | 24(3) |
| 24 | DF | USA | Matt Hedges | 27 | 1 | 4 | 32 |
| 25 | DF | USA | Walker Zimmerman | 18(4) | 1 | 4 | 23(4) |
| 26 | DF | USA | Walker Hume | 2 | 2 | 0 | 4 |
| 27 | FW | USA | Jesús Ferreira | (1) | 0 | 0 | (1) |
| 31 | DF | HON | Maynor Figueroa | 26 | 1 | 3 | 30 |
| 33 | DF | USA | Aaron Guillen | 4(2) | 0 | 1(1) | 5(3) |
| 37 | FW | ARG | Maximiliano Urruti | 31(1) | 1 | 4 | 36(1) |

=== Goals and assists ===
As of final match played October 22, 2017

| No. | Pos. | Name | MLS | | U.S. Open Cup | | CCL | | Total | |
| No. | Pos. | Name | Goals | Assists | Goals | Assists | Goals | Assists | Goals | Assists |
|---|---|---|---|---|---|---|---|---|---|---|
| 2 | DF | (Argentina) Hernán Grana | 1 | 4 | 0 | 0 | 0 | 0 | 1 | 4 |
| 7 | MF | (Ecuador) Carlos Gruezo | 0 | 4 | 0 | 0 | 0 | 2 | 0 | 6 |
| 8 | MF | (United States) Victor Ulloa | 0 | 2 | 0 | 0 | 0 | 0 | 0 | 2 |
| 9 | FW | (Paraguay) Cristian Colmán | 2 | 1 | 0 | 0 | 2 | 0 | 4 | 1 |
| 10 | MF | (Argentina) Mauro Diaz | 2 | 8 | 1 | 1 | 0 | 0 | 3 | 9 |
| 11 | FW | (Argentina) Javier Morales | 1 | 2 | 1 | 0 | 0 | 0 | 2 | 2 |
| 12 | MF | (United States) Ryan Hollingshead | 0 | 0 | 1 | 1 | 0 | 0 | 1 | 1 |
| 13 | FW | (Canada) Tesho Akindele | 4 | 0 | 0 | 0 | 0 | 2 | 4 | 2 |
| 14 | DF | (Saint Kitts and Nevis) Atiba Harris | 2 | 2 | 0 | 0 | 0 | 0 | 2 | 2 |
| 16 | FW | (United States) Coy Craft | 0 | 0 | 1 | 0 | 0 | 0 | 1 | 0 |
| 20 | MF | (Belgium) Roland Lamah | 11 | 3 | 0 | 0 | 0 | 1 | 11 | 4 |
| 21 | MF | (Colombia) Michael Barrios | 3 | 14 | 0 | 0 | 1 | 0 | 4 | 14 |
| 22 | DF | (United States) Reggie Cannon | 0 | 0 | 0 | 1 | 0 | 0 | 0 | 1 |
| 23 | MF | (United States) Kellyn Acosta | 3 | 2 | 0 | 0 | 3 | 0 | 6 | 2 |
| 24 | DF | (United States) Matt Hedges | 2 | 0 | 0 | 0 | 0 | 0 | 2 | 0 |
| 25 | DF | (United States) Walker Zimmerman | 1 | 1 | 0 | 0 | 0 | 0 | 1 | 1 |
| 27 | FW | (United States) Jesús Ferreira | 1 | 0 | 0 | 0 | 0 | 0 | 1 | 0 |
| 31 | DF | (Honduras) Maynor Figueroa | 3 | 1 | 0 | 0 | 0 | 0 | 3 | 1 |
| 37 | FW | (Argentina) Maximiliano Urruti | 12 | 5 | 0 | 0 | 1 | 0 | 13 | 5 |
| | | | 0 | 0 | 1 | 0 | 1 | 0 | 2 | 0 |
| Total | | | 48 | 49 | 5 | 3 | 8 | 5 | 61 | 57 |

=== Disciplinary record ===
As of final match played October 22, 2017

| No. | Pos. | Name | MLS | | U.S. Open Cup | | CCL | | Total | |
| No. | Pos. | Name | Booked | Sent off (straight red) | Booked | Sent off (straight red) | Booked | Sent off (straight red) | Booked | Sent off (straight red) |
|---|---|---|---|---|---|---|---|---|---|---|
| 1 | GK | (United States) Jesse Gonzalez | 3 | 0 | 0 | 0 | 0 | 0 | 3 | 0 |
| 2 | DF | (Argentina) Hernán Grana | 8 | 0 | 0 | 0 | 1 | 0 | 9 | 0 |
| 5 | MF | (Venezuela) Carlos Cermeño | 2 | 0 | 0 | 0 | 0 | 0 | 2 | 0 |
| 7 | MF | (Ecuador) Carlos Gruezo | 7 | 1 | 0 | 0 | 1 | 0 | 8 | 1 |
| 8 | MF | (United States) Victor Ulloa | 1 | 0 | 1 | 0 | 0 | 0 | 2 | 0 |
| 9 | FW | (Paraguay) Cristian Colmán | 1 | 0 | 0 | 0 | 0 | 0 | 1 | 0 |
| 10 | MF | (Argentina) Mauro Diaz | 0 | 0 | 1 | 0 | 0 | 0 | 1 | 0 |
| 11 | FW | (Argentina) Javier Morales | 1 | 0 | 0 | 1 | 0 | 0 | 1 | 1 |
| 13 | FW | (Canada) Tesho Akindele | 3 | 1 | 1 | 0 | 0 | 0 | 4 | 1 |
| 14 | DF | (Saint Kitts and Nevis) Atiba Harris | 7 | 0 | 1 | 0 | 0 | 0 | 8 | 0 |
| 15 | MF | (United States) Jacori Hayes | 1 | 1 | 0 | 0 | 0 | 0 | 1 | 1 |
| 18 | GK | (United States) Chris Seitz | 0 | 0 | 0 | 0 | 1 | 0 | 1 | 0 |
| 19 | MF | (United States) Paxton Pomykal | 0 | 0 | 1 | 0 | 0 | 0 | 1 | 0 |
| 20 | MF | (Belgium) Roland Lamah | 2 | 0 | 0 | 0 | 0 | 0 | 2 | 0 |
| 21 | MF | (Colombia) Michael Barrios | 5 | 0 | 0 | 0 | 0 | 0 | 5 | 0 |
| 23 | MF | (United States) Kellyn Acosta | 2 | 0 | 0 | 0 | 1 | 0 | 3 | 0 |
| 24 | DF | (United States) Matt Hedges | 7 | 0 | 0 | 0 | 3 | 0 | 10 | 0 |
| 25 | DF | (United States) Walker Zimmerman | 0 | 0 | 0 | 0 | 1 | 0 | 1 | 0 |
| 26 | DF | (United States) Walker Hume | 1 | 0 | 0 | 0 | 0 | 0 | 1 | 0 |
| 31 | DF | (Honduras) Maynor Figueroa | 7 | 0 | 0 | 0 | 1 | 0 | 8 | 0 |
| 33 | DF | (United States) Aaron Guillen | 2 | 0 | 0 | 0 | 0 | 0 | 2 | 0 |
| 37 | FW | (Argentina) Maximiliano Urruti | 1 | 0 | 1 | 1 | 0 | 0 | 2 | 1 |
| Total | | | 61 | 3 | 6 | 2 | 9 | 0 | 76 | 5 |

=== Goalkeeper stats ===
As of final match played October 22, 2017

| No. | Name | Total | | | | Major League Soccer | | | | U.S. Open Cup | | | | CCL | | | |
| No. | Name | MIN | GA | GAA | SV | MIN | GA | GAA | SV | MIN | GA | GAA | SV | MIN | GA | GAA | SV |
| 1 | (United States) Jesse Gonzalez | 2730 | 43 | 1.42 | 81 | 2610 | 40 | 1.38 | 76 | 120 | 3 | 2.25 | 5 | 0 | 0 | 0.00 | 0 |
| 18 | (United States) Chris Seitz | 990 | 16 | 1.45 | 29 | 450 | 8 | 1.60 | 12 | 180 | 2 | 1 | 5 | 360 | 6 | 1.5 | 12 |
| | TOTALS | 3720 | 59 | 1.43 | 110 | 3060 | 48 | 1.41 | 88 | 300 | 5 | 1.5 | 10 | 360 | 6 | 1.5 | 12 |

== Kits ==
| Primary | Primary Alt. | Secondary | Secondary Alt. |

| Type | Shirt | Shorts | Socks | First appearance / Info |
|---|---|---|---|---|
| Primary | Red / Dark Red / White hoops | Red | Red / White hoops | MLS, March 11, 2017 against Sporting Kansas City |
| Primary Alternate | Red / Dark Red / White hoops | White | Red / White hoops | CCL, February 23, 2017 against Árabe Unido |
| Secondary | Blue / White | Blue | White / Blue hoops | CCL, March 1, 2017 against Árabe Unido |
| Secondary Alternate | Blue / White | White | White / Blue hoops | MLS, June 10, 2017 against Portland Timbers |

== See also ==
- FC Dallas
- 2017 in American soccer
- 2017 Major League Soccer season
