= Maynor Figueroa =

Honduran footballer (born 1983)

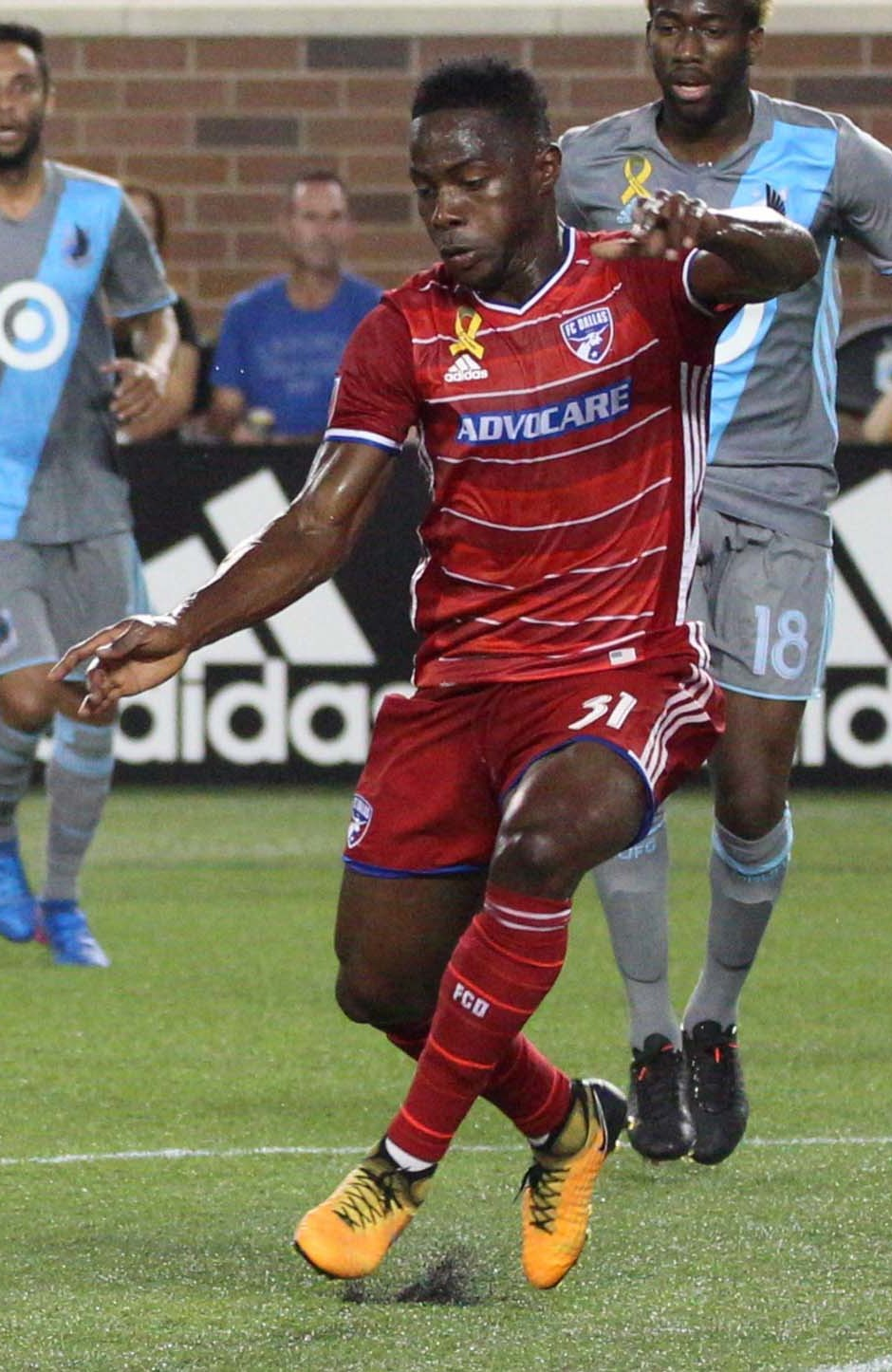
- Figueroa playing for FC Dallas in 2017

Personal information
- Full name: Maynor Alexis Figueroa Róchez
- Date of birth: 2 May 1983 (age 43)
- Place of birth: Jutiapa, Honduras
- Height: 1.82 m (6 ft 0 in)
- Positions: Left-back; centre-back

Youth career
- 1993–1999: Victoria

Senior career*
Years	Team	Apps	(Gls)
1999–2003	Victoria	24	(2)
2003–2008	Olimpia	100	(6)
2008	→ Wigan Athletic (loan)	2	(0)
2008	→ Wigan Athletic (loan)	29	(1)
2008–2013	Wigan Athletic	148	(3)
2013–2015	Hull City	35	(0)
2014	→ Wigan Athletic (loan)	6	(0)
2015	Colorado Rapids	10	(1)
2016–2018	FC Dallas	70	(4)
2019–2021	Houston Dynamo	58	(2)
Total		482	(19)

International career
1999–2003	Honduras U20	3	(1)
2001–2003	Honduras U23	8	(0)
2012	Honduras Olympic (O.P.)	4	(0)
2003–2022	Honduras	181 (Note: Includes also 6 matches that FIFA has not yet recognized as official, but they are official for the Football Federation of Honduras.)	(5)
Medal record
Men's football
Representing Honduras
CONCACAF Nations League
Third place	2021 United States
- * Club domestic league appearances and goals

Maynor Alexis Figueroa Róchez (born 2 May 1983) is a Honduran former professional footballer who played as a left-back or centre-back. He is best known for his time at Wigan Athletic, where he made 179 Premier League appearances and won the 2013 FA Cup. Figueroa made 181 international appearances between 2003 and 2022, including appearances at seven CONCACAF Gold Cups, two FIFA World Cups and the 2012 Summer Olympics.

== Club career ==
=== Early career ===
Born in Jutiapa, Atlántida, Figueroa started his career with Victoria, before moving to Olimpia in 2003. He later became club captain. In 2007, Figueroa received offers from Major League Soccer clubs, one of which was revealed to be New England Revolution, but Olimpia's administrator, Osman Madrid, turned down all the offers. Figueroa had drawn previous interest from foreign clubs aside from those in MLS, including Club Toluca of Mexico making offers during 2007. However, during an interview, Madrid indicated the terms sought by other teams had been neither agreeable nor economically favourable to Olimpia or Figueroa.

=== Loan to Wigan Athletic ===
On 20 December 2007, Honduran newspaper El Heraldo reported that, as a result of interest expressed by the Premier League club Wigan Athletic, Figueroa would travel to England. In January 2008, Figueroa joined Wigan on loan for the rest of the 2007–08 season. In July 2008, after a complicated process involving work permit and visa issues, Figueroa rejoined Wigan on loan for a further six months, after which Wigan had the option to make the deal permanent following a successful loan spell.

=== Permanent move to Wigan ===
On 23 December 2008, Wigan announced Figueroa had signed a three-and-a-half-year contract to join permanently. He scored his first goal for Wigan on 11 January 2009. He scored a close range header to secure a late winner against Tottenham Hotspur. On 12 December 2009, Figueroa scored a goal against Stoke City from his own half to put Wigan in the lead. Figueroa noticed Stoke goalkeeper Thomas Sørensen off his line at a free kick and struck the ball quickly to send the ball soaring over Sørensen and into the net. Although the match ended 2–2, Figueroa made the headlines the following day, with Alan Hansen calling it a candidate for Goal of the Season. Indeed, Figueroa's goal was chosen as Match of the Day's Goal of the Season for 2009–10. By the end of the 2009–10 campaign, he had made 81 appearances and scored twice in all competitions for Wigan.

The 2010–11 campaign proved difficult for Wigan and Figueroa. On 26 February 2011, he made his 100th Premier League appearance, playing the full 90 minutes at left-back in a 4–0 defeat against Manchester United at the DW Stadium. He scored a goal against fellow relegation struggling side Birmingham City on 19 March 2011 that led to a 2–1 win for Wigan. On the last day of the season, Wigan needed to win and have results go their way in order to secure Premier League safety. Figueroa provided the breakthrough for the away side in the 78th minute, setting up Hugo Rodallega to win the game 1–0 at Stoke City and confirm Wigan's safety in the Premier League.

During Wigan's first League Cup game of the 2012–13 season, Figueroa scored from 35 yards out, as Wigan defeated Nottingham Forest 4–1 at the City Ground. Wigan achieved success in the FA Cup winning the competition after beating Manchester City 1–0 in the final. Figueroa had played in every round of the FA Cup but was injured for the FA Cup final; however he did receive an FA Cup Winner's medal However, they did not have as much success in the Premier League and were relegated at the end of the season.

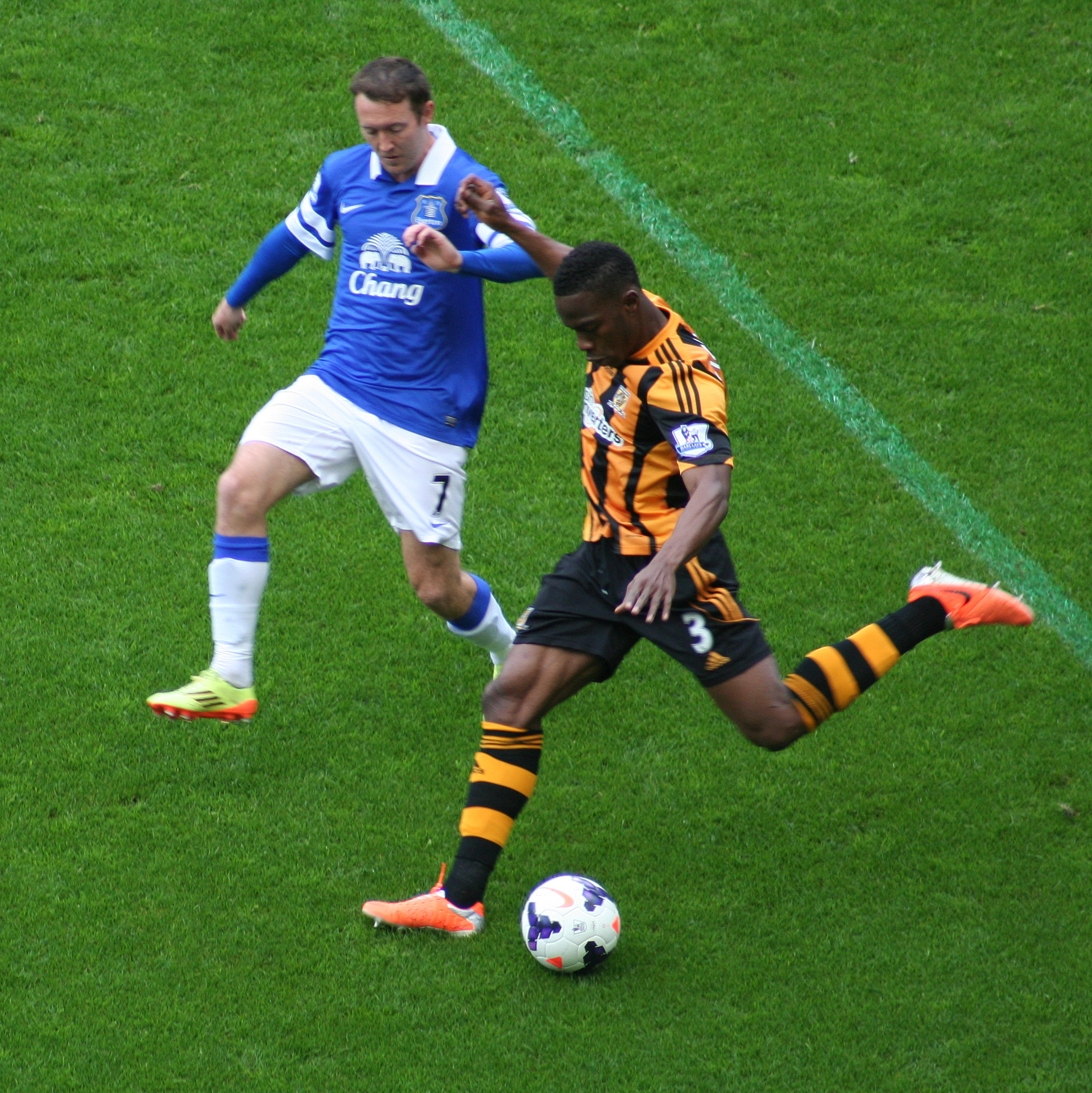
Figueroa (right) playing for Hull City in 2014

=== Hull City ===
Newly promoted Premier League side Hull City announced the signing of Figueroa on a free transfer on 17 June 2013. He made his debut on the first day of the 2013–14 season in a 2–0 loss away at Chelsea. Figueroa reached an FA Cup Final for the second successive season after playing in every game prior to the final. Whereas he missed the 2013 FA Cup Final through injury, he was an unused substitute for the 2014 FA Cup Final after manager Steve Bruce changed the system to 5-3-2 with the manager's son Alex Bruce starting ahead of Figueroa. Hull lost the final 3–2 to Arsenal after extra-time. On 21 October 2014 Figueroa returned to Wigan Athletic on a month-loan and went on to play in the 0–0 draw against Millwall the same day. After five consecutive games for the club since joining on loan, Wigan extended his loan deal until 30 December 2014. He was recalled to Hull on 22 December 2014, along with Tom Ince from Nottingham Forest. On 28 May 2015, Figueroa was one of six players released by Hull manager Steve Bruce.

=== Colorado Rapids ===
Following his release by Hull City, Figueroa joined MLS team Colorado Rapids on 7 August 2015. He made his Rapids and MLS debut on 14 August in a 1–0 defeat to the San Jose Earthquakes. Figueroa scored his first goal for Colorado on 29 August in a 2–1 win over Sporting Kansas City. Figueroa would play in 10 games for Colorado. He was unable to save the Rapids season as they failed to qualify for the playoffs and finished the year in last place in the Western Conference.

=== FC Dallas ===
On 26 January 2016, Figueroa was traded to FC Dallas in exchange for General Allocation Money. He made his debut for FC Dallas on 6 March in a 2–0 win over the Philadelphia Union. Figueroa scored his first goal for Dallas on 4 August against Real Estelí in the CONCACAF Champions League, rocketing a shot into the top right corner in the 84th minute to give Dallas a 2–1 victory. He would start in the quarter-finals, semi-final and final to help Dallas win the 2016 U.S. Open Cup. Figueroa also made 28 MLS appearances to help lead Dallas to win the Supporters' Shield. In the playoffs, he would start both legs of Dallas's conference semi-final tie with Seattle Sounders FC, but they would fall 4–2 on aggregate.

On 22 April, Figueroa scored his first MLS goal for Dallas in a 1–0 win over Sporting Kansas City. He was named to the MLS Team of the Week following a strong performance in a 1–1 draw with the Vancouver Whitecaps on 17 June. He scored his second league goal with Dallas on 23 August, blasting a ball into the top of the net in a 3–3 draw with the Houston Dynamo in a Texas Derby match. On 27 August, Figueroa would score against his former team to lead Dallas to a 2–0 win over Colorado. Dallas would finish in 7th place in the Western Conference and miss out on the playoffs in 2017 after a late season collapse saw them win 2 of their final 14 games, just one year after doing a US Open Cup and Supporters Shield double.

2018 saw a reduced role for Figueroa, with the additions of the younger Anton Nedyalkov and Marquinhos Pedroso competing for the left back spot. He would only make 20 appearances as he split time as a left back and center back. Figueroa's loan goal of the season came on 18 August in a 2–0 win over Minnesota United FC. He would help Dallas return to the playoffs in 2018. On 26 November, Figueroa had his contract option declined.

=== Houston Dynamo ===
On 30 January 2019, Figueroa signed with FC Dallas's biggest rivals, the Houston Dynamo. Figueroa made his Dynamo debut on 19 February 2019 in a 1–0 win over CD Guastatoya in the CONCACAF Champions League. He made 4 appearances in the CCL as the Dynamo reached the quarterfinals. He made his first league appearance for the Dynamo on 2 March in a 1–1 draw with Real Salt Lake. Figueroa ended his first season in Houston with 25 appearances and 3 assists in league play as Houston finished 10th in the Western Conference, missing out on the playoffs. On 20 December, Figueroa signed a new contract to stay in Houston.

Figueroa and the Dynamo opened the 2020 season on 29 February with a 1–1 draw against the LA Galaxy, with Figueroa playing the full match. He scored his first goal for the Dynamo on 19 September to help Houston to a 2–2 draw with Minnesota United FC. On 26 September Figueroa scored in the 89th minute to give the Dynamo a 1–1 draw with Nashville SC. In a shortened season due to the COVID-19 pandemic, Figueroa appeared in 20 of Houston's 23 matches and scored 2 goals. The Dynamo had a poor season as a team, finishing last in the Western Conference and missing the playoffs again.

Figueroa's contract with Houston expired following the 2020 season. He re-signed with Houston on 10 February 2021. He served as a backup centerback during the 2021 season, making 13 appearances and recording 2 assists. It was another disappointing season for the Dynamo, as Houston finished last in the West for the second consecutive season and missed out on the playoffs again.

Following the 2021 season, Figueroa's contract option was declined by Houston.

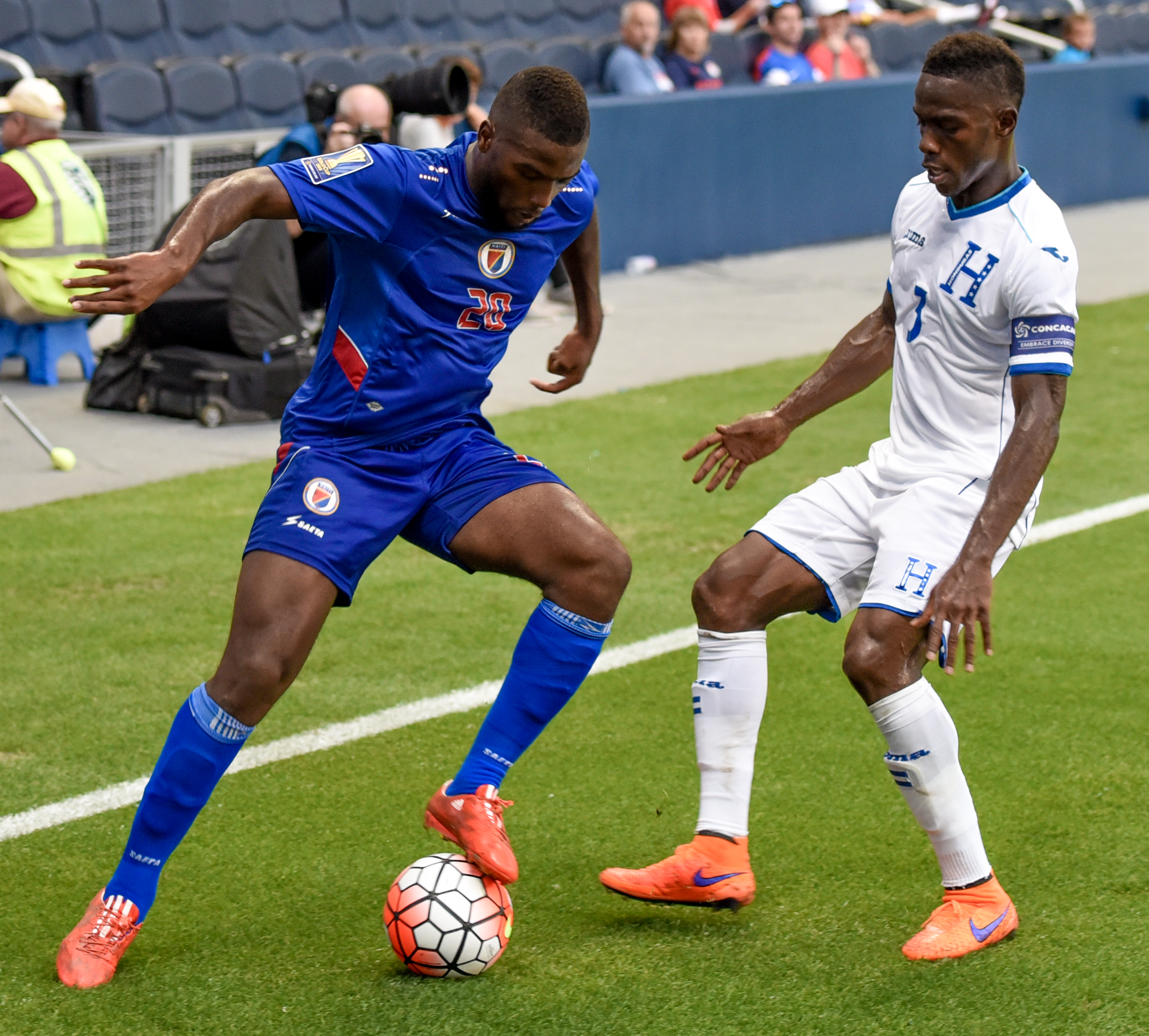
Duckens Nazon of Haiti against Figueroa in the Gold Cup, Sporting Park, Kansas City, Kansas, 13 July 2015.

== International career ==
Figueroa made his debut for Honduras in 2003 and was a part of the Honduras squad at the 2005, 2007, 2011, 2015, 2017, 2019 and 2021 CONCACAF Gold Cups, earning a combined total of 25 caps. He was also named in the 23-man squad for the 2010 FIFA World Cup in South Africa. At the time, Figueroa played out of position as a centre–back at the World Cup, due to emergence of Emilio Izaguirre at the left–back position. He was again named to Honduras' squad for the 2014 World Cup. Figueroa also represented Honduras at U-20 and U-23 level from 1999 to 2003 and 2001 to 2003 respectively, scoring once in three games for the U-20s. He joined the U-23 squad as an overage player for the 2012 Summer Olympics. He has won over 180 caps, the most for Honduras, scoring six goals since his debut, and served as captain from 2014 until 2022. In June 2021, Figueroa led Honduras into the finals of the inaugural CONCACAF Nations League tournament. He would play in Honduras' 1–0 loss to the United States, and in the third place play-off, where Honduras prevailed over rivals Costa Rica 5–4 on penalties, after a 2–2 draw.

== Personal life ==
Figueroa is married to Sandra Norales, a handball player who represented Honduras in that sport. Together they have two sons and one daughter. One of their sons, Keyrol, plays as a forward for Liverpool Academy. Figueroa also has a son with Laura Moncada, named Dereck, who plays as forward for Lugano in the Swiss Super League.

Figueroa is of Garifuna heritage. He is close friends with Honduran and former Dynamo teammate Boniek García. In 2020 Figueroa received his U.S. green card which qualified him as a domestic player for MLS roster purposes.

== Career statistics ==
=== Club ===
Appearances and goals by club, season and competition
Club	Season	League			National cup (Note: Includes FA Cup and US Open Cup appearances)		League cup (Note: Includes EFL Cup and MLS Cup Playoffs appearances)		Other (Note: Includes UEFA Europa League and CONCACAF Champions League appearances)		Total	
Club	Season	Division	Apps	Goals	Apps	Goals	Apps	Goals	Apps	Goals	Apps	Goals
Victoria	2000–01	Liga Nacional										
Victoria	2001–02	Liga Nacional										
Victoria	Total		24	2							24	2
Olimpia	2002–03	Liga Nacional										
Olimpia	2003–04	Liga Nacional										
Olimpia	2004–05	Liga Nacional										
Olimpia	2005–06	Liga Nacional										
Olimpia	2006–07	Liga Nacional										
Olimpia	2007–08	Liga Nacional	27	1	0	0	0	0	0	0	27	1
Olimpia	Total		100	6							100	6
Wigan Athletic	2007–08	Premier League	2	0	0	0	0	0	—		2	0
Wigan Athletic	2008–09	Premier League	38	1	1	0	2	0	—		41	1
Wigan Athletic	2009–10	Premier League	35	1	3	0	0	0	—		38	1
Wigan Athletic	2010–11	Premier League	33	1	2	0	4	0	—		39	1
Wigan Athletic	2011–12	Premier League	38	0	0	0	1	0	—		39	0
Wigan Athletic	2012–13	Premier League	33	1	6	1	2	1	—		41	3
Wigan Athletic	Total		179	4	12	1	9	1	0	0	200	6
Hull City	2013–14	Premier League	32	0	6	0	0	0	—		38	0
Hull City	2014–15	Premier League	3	0	1	0	1	0	2	0	7	0
Hull City	Total		35	0	7	0	1	0	2	0	45	0
Wigan Athletic (loan)	2014–15	Championship	6	0	0	0	0	0	—		6	0
Colorado Rapids	2015	MLS	10	1	0	0	—		—		10	1
FC Dallas	2016	MLS	30	0	3	0	2	0	3	1	38	1
FC Dallas	2017	MLS	26	3	1	0	—		3	0	30	3
FC Dallas	2018	MLS	16	1	2	0	0	0	2	0	20	0
FC Dallas	Total		72	4	6	0	2	0	8	1	88	4
Houston Dynamo	2019	MLS	25	0	0	0	—		4	0	29	0
Houston Dynamo	2020	MLS	20	2	—		—		—		20	2
Houston Dynamo	2021	MLS	13	0	—		—		—		13	0
Houston Dynamo	Total		58	2	0	0	0	0	4	0	62	2
Career total			484	19	25	1	12	1	14	1	535	22

=== International ===
Appearances and goals by national team and year
National team	Year	Apps	Goals
Honduras	2003	3	0
Honduras	2004	13	0
Honduras	2005	9	1
Honduras	2006	4	1
Honduras	2007	16	0
Honduras	2008	12	0
Honduras	2009	9	0
Honduras	2010	9	0
Honduras	2011	9	0
Honduras	2012	8	0
Honduras	2013	9	1
Honduras	2014	11	1
Honduras	2015	15	0
Honduras	2016	7	0
Honduras	2017	13	0
Honduras	2018	3	0
Honduras	2019	12	1
Honduras	2020	1	0
Honduras	2021	15	0
Honduras	2022	3	0
Total		181	5

Scores and results list Honduras' goal tally first, score column indicates score after each Figueroa goal.

List of international goals scored by Maynor Figueroa
No.	Date	Venue	Opponent	Score	Result	Competition
1	5 July 2005	Orange Bowl, Miami, United States	Trinidad and Tobago	1–1	1–1	2005 CONCACAF Gold Cup
2	10 October 2006	Herndon Stadium, Atlanta, United States	Guatemala	1–0	2–1	Friendly
3	15 October 2013	Independence Park, Kingston, Jamaica	Jamaica	2–1	2–2	2014 FIFA World Cup qualification
4	14 October 2014	FAU Stadium, Boca Raton, United States	United States	1–1	1–1	Friendly
5	6 June 2019	Estadio Antonio Aranda, Ciudad del Este, Paraguay	Paraguay	1–1	1–1	Friendly

== Honours ==
Olimpia

- Liga Nacional Apertura: 2005
- Liga Nacional Clausura: 2004, 2005, 2006

Wigan Athletic

- FA Cup: 2012–13

Hull City

- FA Cup runner-up: 2013–14

FC Dallas

- Supporters' Shield: 2016
- Western Conference Regular Season: 2016
- U.S. Open Cup: 2016

Honduras

- CONCACAF Nations League third place: 2021

Individual

- Premier League Goal of the Season: 2009–10
- BBC Goal of the Season: 2009–10
- FIFA Century Club

== See also ==
- List of men's footballers with 100 or more international caps
