= Luis González (footballer, born 1990) =

Venezuelan footballer

Personal information
- Full name: Luis Daniel González Cova
- Date of birth: 22 December 1990 (age 35)
- Place of birth: Cariaco, Venezuela
- Height: 1.68 m (5 ft 6 in)
- Position: Attacking midfielder

Team information
- Current team: Monagas

Youth career
- –2010: Caracas

Senior career*
Years	Team	Apps	(Gls)
2010–2014	Caracas	92	(10)
2015	Deportivo La Guaira	12	(1)
2015–2016	Mineros de Guayana	36	(3)
2016–2017	Monagas	45	(17)
2017	FC Dallas	2	(0)
2018	Monagas	15	(0)
2018–2019	Deportes Tolima	38	(7)
2019–2025	Atlético Junior	190	(38)
2025–2026	Deportivo Tachira	30	(6)
2026–	Monagas	2	(1)

International career^{‡}
2016–	Venezuela	13	(0)
Medal record
Men's football
Representing Venezuela
FIFA Series
Runner-up	2026 Uzbekistan
- * Club domestic league appearances and goals as of 18 March 2026 ‡ National team caps and goals as of 19:28, 30 March 2026 (UTC)

Luis Daniel González Cova (born 22 December 1990) is a Venezuelan footballer who plays as a midfielder for Monagas and the Venezuela national team.

== International career ==
González made his senior international debut in a 1–0 friendly win over Costa Rica. He played 79 minutes before being replaced by Ángelo Peña.

== Career statistics ==
=== Club ===
As of 18 March 2026

Club	Season	League			National cup (Note: Includes Copa Venezuela, MLS Cup, Copa Colombia)		Continental		Other		Total	
Club	Season	Division	Apps	Goals	Apps	Goals	Apps	Goals	Apps	Goals	Apps	Goals
Caracas	2010–11	Liga FUTVE	9	0	0	0	1 (Note: Appearances in the Copa Sudamericana)	0	–		10	0
Caracas	2011–12	Liga FUTVE	19	1	0	0	2 (Note: Appearances in the Copa Libertadores)	0	–		21	1
Caracas	2012–13	Liga FUTVE	19	0	0	0	1	0	–		20	0
Caracas	2013–14	Liga FUTVE	31	8	0	0	0	0	–		31	8
Caracas	2014–15	Liga FUTVE	14	1	0	0	6 (Note: Two appearances in the Copa Libertadores, four appearances in the Copa Sudamericana)	0	–		20	1
Caracas	Total		92	10	0	0	10	0	–		102	10
Deportivo La Guaira	2014–15	Liga FUTVE	12	1	0	0	0	0	–		12	1
Mineros de Guayana	2015	Liga FUTVE	21	3	2	0	0	0	–		23	3
Mineros de Guayana	2016	Liga FUTVE	15	0	0	0	0	0	–		15	0
Mineros de Guayana	Total		36	3	2	0	0	0	–		38	3
Monagas	2016	Liga FUTVE	21	7	2	0	0	0	–		23	7
Monagas	2017	Liga FUTVE	25	10	0	0	0	0	–		25	10
Monagas	Total		46	17	2	0	0	0	–		48	17
FC Dallas	2017	MLS	2	0	–		–		–		2	0
Monagas	2018	Liga FUTVE	15	0	–		–		–		15	0
Deportes Tolima	2018	Liga DIMAYOR	17	1	–		–		–		17	1
Deportes Tolima	2019	Liga DIMAYOR	21	6	0	0	8 (Note: Six appearances in Copa Libertadores, two appearances in Copa Sudamericana)	0	2 (Note: Appearances in Superliga Colombiana)	0	31	6
Deportes Tolima	Total		38	7	0	0	8	0	2	0	48	7
Atlético Junior	2019	Liga DIMAYOR	22	1	2	0	–		–		24	1
Atlético Junior	2020	Liga DIMAYOR	16	3	0	0	8 (Note: Five appearances in Copa Libertadores, three appearances in Copa Sudamericana)	0	2	0	26	0
Atlético Junior	2021	Liga DIMAYOR	34	9	2	0	9 (Note: Seven appearances in Copa Libertadores, two appearances and one goal in Copa Sudamericana)	1	–		45	10
Atlético Junior	2022	Liga DIMAYOR	36	11	5	0	5	1	–		46	12
Atlético Junior	2023	Liga DIMAYOR	40	9	1	1	1	0	–		42	10
Atlético Junior	2024	Liga DIMAYOR	32	2	1	0	4	0	1	0	37	2
Atlético Junior	2025	Liga DIMAYOR	14	2	0	0	1	0	–		15	2
Atlético Junior	Total		194	37	11	1	28	1	3	0	236	39
Deportivo Táchira	2025	Liga FUTVE	16	1	1	0	–		–		17	1
Deportivo Táchira	2026	Liga FUTVE	7	2	0	0	4	1	–		11	3
Deportivo Táchira	Total		23	3	1	0	4	1	–		28	4
Career total			458	78	16	1	50	3	5	0	529	82

=== International ===
As of match played 30 March 2026.

National team	Year	Apps	Goals
Venezuela	2016	3	0
Venezuela	2018	4	0
Venezuela	2021	2	0
Venezuela	2022	1	0
Venezuela	2026	2	0
Total		13	0

== Honours ==
Caracas FC

- Copa Venezuela: 2013

Monagas

- Primera División Venezolana: 2017
- Torneo Apertura: 2017

Junior

- Categoría Primera A: 2023-II
- Superliga Colombiana: 2020

Venezuela

- FIFA Series runner-up: 2026
