= Cristian Colmán =

Paraguayan footballer (born 1994)

Personal information
- Full name: Cristian Ariel Colmán Ortiz
- Date of birth: 26 February 1994 (age 32)
- Place of birth: San Cosme y Damián, Paraguay
- Height: 1.85 m (6 ft 1 in)
- Position: Forward

Team information
- Current team: San Lorenzo
- Number: 35

Senior career*
| Years | Team | Apps | (Gls) |
| 2014 | 3 de Febrero | 40 | (13) |
| 2015–2016 | Nacional Asunción | 68 | (19) |
| 2017–2019 | FC Dallas | 41 | (4) |
| 2019 | → North Texas SC | 6 | (0) |
| 2020 | Barcelona SC | 27 | (5) |
| 2021–2022 | Godoy Cruz | 26 | (3) |
| 2022 | Arsenal de Sarandí | 16 | (7) |
| 2022 | Barracas Central | 16 | (4) |
| 2023 | Universidad Católica | 13 | (2) |
| 2024 | Gimnasia LP | 10 | (1) |
| 2024–2025 | Deportivo Cali | 5 | (0) |
| 2025–2026 | Nacional Asunción | 23 | (3) |
| 2026– | San Lorenzo | 4 | (0) |

International career
| 2015 | Paraguay U23 | 3 | (0) |
- * Club domestic league appearances and goals as of 13 March 2026

Cristian Ariel Colmán Ortiz (born 26 February 1994) is a Paraguayan professional footballer who plays as a forward for Paraguayan Primera División club San Lorenzo.

== Career ==
On 26 January 2017, Colmán signed as a young designated player for FC Dallas. On February 23, 2017 Colmán scored his first goal for FC Dallas in his first match against Árabe Unido in the first leg of the CONCACAF Champions League quarterfinals. His second goal came in the CONCACAF Champions League semifinal second leg in a loss against Pachuca.

Colmán was released by Dallas at the end of their 2019 season.
