= Jesse González =

American soccer player (born 1995)

Personal information
- Full name: José Luis González Gudina
- Date of birth: May 25, 1995 (age 31)
- Place of birth: Edenton, North Carolina, United States
- Height: 6 ft 4 in (1.93 m)
- Position: Goalkeeper

Youth career
- 2011–2013: FC Dallas

Senior career*
Years	Team	Apps	(Gls)
2013–2020	FC Dallas	101	(0)
2015	→ Pittsburgh Riverhounds (loan)	1	(0)
2023	Antigua	10	(0)

International career
2015	Mexico U20	7	(0)
2016	Mexico U23	1	(0)
- * Club domestic league appearances and goals as of November 5, 2023

José Luis "Jesse" González Gudina (born May 25, 1995) is an American professional soccer player who plays as a goalkeeper.

== Early life ==
González was born in North Carolina. He grew up in Texas and played for a local Dallas team named C.D. Independiente under head coach Jose Antonio Radilla.

== Club career ==
González was recruited by FC Dallas at the age of 16 and started in the academy; he was signed to a professional contract a few years later. On March 25, 2013, he signed a Homegrown Player (HGP) contract with the club, making him the 10th homegrown signing in club history.

González was loaned to United Soccer League club Pittsburgh Riverhounds in August 2015. He then became a starter for FC Dallas towards the end of the 2015 season, starting the club's final 11 regular-season matches of 2015 as well as four playoff matches. After being benched for most of 2016, Gonzalez emerged as FC Dallas' starting goalkeeper for the 2017 MLS season, ranking among the best in the league in both goals against average and in save percentage.

On June 6, 2020, González was suspended by MLS following alleged domestic abuse allegations. On August 7, 2020, González and Dallas mutually agreed to terminate his contract.

== International career ==
González was eligible to play for Mexico or the United States, having been born and raised in the U.S. to Mexican parents. He played for Mexico national youth teams, including as the Mexico under-20 starting goalkeeper at the 2015 CONCACAF U-20 Championship and the 2015 FIFA U-20 World Cup.

In December 2015, it was reported that González was planning to join the United States men's national soccer team for their January 2016 training camp. It was later reported that he had changed his mind and was named as part of the Mexico under-23 preliminary roster for the 2016 Olympics.

On June 3, 2017, González was named by Bruce Arena to the United States' 40-man preliminary roster for the 2017 Gold Cup. On June 29, U.S. Soccer confirmed that González's one-time switch had been approved by FIFA, and moving forward he would represent the United States at the international level. On July 16, González was added to the United States' 23-man roster for the Gold Cup knockout stage, but did not see the field as the U.S. won the competition.

== Honors ==
FC Dallas

- U.S. Open Cup: 2016
- Supporters' Shield: 2016

Mexico U20

- CONCACAF U-20 Championship: 2015

United States

- CONCACAF Gold Cup: 2017
