= Walker Hume =

American soccer center-back (born 1993)

Personal information
- Date of birth: August 22, 1993 (age 33)
- Place of birth: Dallas, Texas, United States
- Height: 6 ft 5 in (1.96 m)
- Position: Defender

College career
Years	Team	Apps	(Gls)
2012–2013	Rollins Tars	39	(12)
2014–2016	North Carolina Tar Heels	36	(8)

Senior career*
Years	Team	Apps	(Gls)
2013–2014	Austin Aztex	24	(3)
2015	Midland/Odessa Sockers	12	(1)
2016	Portland Timbers U23s	3	(0)
2017	FC Dallas	2	(0)
2017	→ Orange County SC (loan)	9	(0)
2018–2019	Orange County SC	51	(0)
- * Club domestic league appearances and goals as of April 18, 2021

Walker Hume (born August 22, 1993) is an American soccer center-back.

== Playing career ==
=== College and amateur ===
Hume began playing college soccer at Rollins College in 2012, before transferring to the University of North Carolina at Chapel Hill for their 2014 season. Hume missed the entirety of the 2015 season due to injury.

While at college, Hume appeared for Austin Aztex, Midland/Odessa Sockers and Portland Timbers U23s in the Premier Development League.

=== Professional ===
On January 13, 2017, Hume was selected by FC Dallas in the second Round (37th overall) of the 2017 MLS SuperDraft. He signed with the team on February 21, 2017.

== Personal ==
He has a twin brother, Tucker, who currently plays for United Soccer League club Nashville SC.

His grandfather is former NFL player Tom Franckhauser, who played for the Los Angeles Rams, Dallas Cowboys and Minnesota Vikings.
