= Carlos Cermeño =

Venezuelan footballer (born 1995)

Personal information
- Full name: Carlos Eduardo Cermeño Uzcategui
- Date of birth: 8 August 1995 (age 31)
- Place of birth: Maturín, Venezuela
- Height: 5 ft 7 in (1.70 m)
- Position: Midfielder

Team information
- Current team: Anzoátegui

Senior career*
Years	Team	Apps	(Gls)
2011–2013	Monagas SC	4	(0)
2013–2017	Deportivo Táchira	95	(5)
2017	→ FC Dallas (loan)	8	(0)
2018	Alianza Petrolera	6	(0)
2018–2020	Deportivo Táchira	78	(7)
2021	Deportivo La Guaira	29	(0)
2022–2023	Metropolitanos	52	(7)
2024	Academia Puerto Cabello	24	(0)
2025	Portuguesa	21	(1)
2025-2026	UCV	16	(0)
2026-	Anzoátegui	7	(0)

International career^{‡}
2015	Venezuela U20	2	(0)
2014	Venezuela U21	5	(0)
2016–	Venezuela	1	(0)
- * Club domestic league appearances and goals as of 10 March 2026 ‡ National team caps and goals as of 24 March 2016

Carlos Eduardo Cermeño Uzcategui (born 8 August 1995) is a Venezuelan footballer who plays for Anzoátegui.

== Career ==
Cermeño began his career with Monagas in the Venezuelan first division in 2011. He played four matches before being transferred to Venezuelan first division club, Deportivo Táchira in 2013. In February 2017, FC Dallas loaned in Cermeño from Deportivo Táchira.

== International ==
Carlos participated in the 2014 Central American and Caribbean Games and 2015 South American Youth Football Championship.

He made his full national team debut on March 24, 2016.

== Honours ==
=== Club ===
Deportivo Táchira

- Venezuelan Primera Division: 2014/15
