= Hernán Grana =

Argentine footballer

Personal information
- Full name: Hernán Gustavo Grana
- Date of birth: 12 April 1985 (age 41)
- Place of birth: Quilmes, Argentina
- Height: 1.70 m (5 ft 7 in)
- Position: Right-back

Team information
- Current team: All Boys

Youth career
- Platense

Senior career*
Years	Team	Apps	(Gls)
2003–2006	Platense	26	(0)
2007	Los Andes	21	(0)
2007–2008	All Boys	39	(1)
2008–2013	Lanús	54	(0)
2011	→ Quilmes (loan)	13	(0)
2011–2012	→ Belgrano (loan)	23	(1)
2012–2013	→ All Boys (loan)	36	(1)
2013–2014	All Boys	19	(1)
2014	→ Boca Juniors (loan)	20	(0)
2015	Columbus Crew SC	7	(0)
2016	All Boys	20	(0)
2016–2024	Ferro Carril Oeste	186	(5)
2017	→ FC Dallas (loan)	30	(1)
2024–	All Boys	77	(2)
- * Club domestic league appearances and goals as of 17:45, 25 March 2026 (UTC)

Hernán Gustavo Grana (born 12 April 1985) is an Argentine football defender currently playing for All Boys.

== Career ==
Grana began his playing career in 2003 in the regionalised 3rd division of Argentine football with Platense. In 2006, he was part of the team that won the Apertura 2006 championship.

In 2007, he joined Los Andes but left the club to join All Boys later in the year. Grana won his second B Metropolitana championship with All Boys in 2007-08 helping the team to gain promotion to the 2nd tier.

Following his success at All Boys he was given his chance to play in the Primera División when he was signed by Lanús in 2008. He made his league debut for the club on 28 October 2008 in a 1–0 away defeat to Estudiantes. He has since established himself as a regular member of the first team. In 2012, he was signed by All Boys again on loan after play in Quilmes and Belgrano. Grana was sold to Columbus Crew SC on 23 January 2015 for an undisclosed amount. Grana and Columbus mutually agreed to terminate his contract on 12 May 2015 due to homesickness.

== Honours ==
Platense

- Primera B Metropolitana (1): Torneo Apertura 2006

All Boys

- Primera B Metropolitana (1):2007-08
