= 2019 Houston Dynamo season =

Houston Dynamo
MLS season
- Owner: Gabriel Brener
- General manager: Matt Jordan
- Head coach: Davy Arnaud (interim head coach)
- Stadium: BBVA Compass Stadium
- MLS: Conference: 10th Overall: 19th
- MLS Cup playoffs: Did not qualify
- U.S. Open Cup: Round of 16
- Leagues Cup: Quarter-finals
- CONCACAF Champions League: Quarter-finals
- Top goalscorer: League: Mauro Manotas (13 goals); All: Mauro Manotas (15 goals)
- Highest home attendance: League/All: 21,777 (October 6 vs. LA Galaxy)
- Lowest home attendance: League: 12,601 (March 9 vs. Montreal); All: 4,559 (June 18 vs. Minnesota United FC, USOC )
- Average home league attendance: 15,651
- Biggest win: 4–0 vs. NY Red Bulls (July 3, League play)
- Biggest defeat: 0–5 at Atlanta United FC (July 17, League play)
Home colors	Away colors

The 2019 Houston Dynamo season was the club's 14th season of existence since joining Major League Soccer in the 2006 season. The Dynamo missed the playoffs in 2018, but they did win the 2018 US Open Cup, the first in club history. The Open Cup victory also qualified the Dynamo for the 2019 CONCACAF Champions League. It was the Dynamo's third year with Wilmer Cabrera as head coach and fifth season under general manager Matt Jordan. On the front office end, it is Gabriel Brener's fourth season as majority owner. On November 1, 2018, John Walker was announced as the new President of Business Operations, replacing Chris Canetti who stepped down on October 26. On July 18, NBA and Houston Rockets All-Star James Harden became a minority owner in the Dynamo.

The Dynamo got off to their best start in club history, winning 6 and drawing 1 in their first 8 league matches. However, Houston would lose form as the season progressed. The Dynamo were knocked out of the Champions League in the quarter-finals to Tigres and fell to Minnesota United at home in the Round of 16 for the US Open Cup. After a 14-game stretch that saw the Dynamo only get 2 wins and 1 draw that included 4-0 and 5-0 defeats to the Portland Timbers and Atlanta United FC respectively, the Dynamo had fallen down to 9th place in the Western Conference. On August 13, Cabrera was fired as head coach. Assistant coach Davy Arnaud was promoted to interim head coach. Arnaud and the newly acquired Christian Ramirez were able to improve the Dynamo's performances at the end of the season, but not enough to lead them into the playoffs. Houston missed the playoffs for the 5th time in 6 years and team captain DaMarcus Beasley retired at the end of the season.

== Current squad ==
As of October 7, 2019

Appearances and goals are totals for MLS regular season only. Age and stats are up to the end of the season.

No.	Name	Nationality	Position	Date of birth (Age)	Signed from	Signed in	Apps.	Goals
Goalkeepers
1	Tyler Deric (HGP)	(United States)	GK	August 30, 1988 (age 31)	North Carolina Tar Heels	2009	90	0
23	Joe Willis	(United States)	GK	August 10, 1988 (age 31)	DC United	2015	87	0
26	Michael Nelson	(United States)	GK	February 10, 1995 (age 24)	Southern Methodist University	2018	0	0
Defenders
2	Alejandro Fuenmayor	(Venezuela)	DF	August 29, 1996 (age 23)	Carabobo FC	2018	30	3
3	Adam Lundkvist	(Sweden)	DF	March 20, 1994 (age 25)	IF Elfsborg	2018	44	0
6	Aljaž Struna	(Slovenia)	DF	August 4, 1990 (age 29)	Palermo	2018	29	0
7	DaMarcus Beasley	(United States)	DF	May 24, 1982 (age 37)	Puebla	2014	124	3
15	Maynor Figueroa	(Honduras)	DF	May 2, 1983 (age 36)	FC Dallas	2019	25	0
16	Kevin Garcia	(United States)	DF	August 21, 1990 (age 29)	Rio Grande Valley	2016	30	1
18	José Bizama	(Chile)	DF	June 25, 1994 (age 25)	Club Deportivo Huachipato	2019	5	0
20	A. J. DeLaGarza	(Guam)	DF	November 4, 1987 (age 31)	LA Galaxy	2017	57	0
28	Erik McCue (HGP)	(United States)	DF	January 18, 2001 (age 18)	Houston Dynamo Academy	2018	0	0
29	Sam Junqua	(United States)	DF	November 9, 1996 (age 22)	University of California	2019	0	0
Midfielders
5	Juan David Cabezas	(Colombia)	MF	February 27, 1991 (age 28)	Deportivo Cali	2017	48	2
8	Memo Rodríguez (HGP)	(United States)	MF	December 27, 1995 (age 23)	Rio Grande Valley	2017	54	10
10	Tomás Martínez (DP)	(Argentina)	MF	March 7, 1995 (age 24)	Braga	2017	74	12
11	Tommy McNamara	(United States)	MF	February 6, 1991 (age 28)	New York City FC	2019	33	2
12	Niko Hansen	(Denmark)	MF	September 14, 1997 (age 22)	Columbus Crew SC	2019	4	0
14	Marlon Hairston	(United States)	MF	March 23, 1994 (age 25)	Colorado Rapids	2019	12	0
22	Matías Vera	(Argentina)	MF	October 26, 1995 (age 23)	San Lorenzo	2018	30	0
24	Darwin Cerén	(El Salvador)	MF	December 31, 1989 (age 29)	San Jose Earthquakes	2018	37	2
25	Eric Bird	(United States)	MF	April 8, 1993 (age 26)	Rio Grande Valley	2017	6	0
27	Boniek García	(Honduras)	MF	September 4, 1984 (age 35)	Olimpia	2012	201	13
Forwards
9	Mauro Manotas	(Colombia)	FW	July 15, 1995 (age 24)	Uniautónoma	2015	129	48
13	Christian Ramirez	(United States)	FW	April 4, 1991 (age 28)	LAFC	2019	10	5
17	Alberth Elis (DP)	(Honduras)	FW	February 12, 1996 (age 23)	Monterrey	2017	82	30
18	Michael Salazar	(Belize)	FW	November 15, 1992 (age 26)	Rio Grande Valley	2019	7	0
21	Ronaldo Peña	(Venezuela)	FW	March 10, 1997 (age 22)	Caracas FC	2018	13	1
31	Romell Quioto	(Honduras)	FW	August 9, 1991 (age 28)	Olimpia	2017	72	15

== Player movement ==
=== In ===
Per Major League Soccer and club policies terms of the deals do not get disclosed.

Date	Player	Position	Age	Previous club	Notes	Ref
October 30, 2018	(United States) Erik McCue	DF	17	(United States) Houston Dynamo Academy	Home Grown Player	
December 17, 2018	(United States) Chris Duvall	DF	27	(Canada) Montreal Impact	Acquired in exchange for Houston's 3rd round pick in the 2020 MLS SuperDraft	
December 21, 2018	(Argentina) Matías Vera	MF	23	(Argentina) San Lorenzo	Full Rights Purchased	
December 24, 2018	(Slovenia) Aljaž Struna	DF	28	(Italy) Palermo	Full Rights Purchased	
January 11, 2019	(United States) Tommy McNamara	MF	27	(United States) New York City FC	Selected in second stage of the 2018 MLS Re-Entry Draft.	
January 11, 2019	(United States) Marlon Hairston	MF	24	(United States) Colorado Rapids	Acquired in exchange for $175,000 in General Allocation Money	
January 30, 2019	(Honduras) Maynor Figueroa	DF	35	(United States) FC Dallas	Free Transfer	
June 10, 2019	(Belize) Michael Salazar	FW	26	(United States) Rio Grande Valley FC Toros	Promoted from the Dynamo's USL Championship affiliate	
July 11, 2019	(Chile) José Bizama	DF	25	(Chile) Huachipato	Full Rights Purchased	
August 7, 2019	(United States) Christian Ramirez	FW	28	(United States) LAFC	Acquired in exchange for $175,000 in General Allocation Money and $75,000 in Targeted Allocation Money	
August 8, 2019	(Denmark) Niko Hansen	MF	24	(United States) Columbus Crew SC	Acquired in exchange for $75,000 in Targeted Allocation Money	

=== Out ===
Date	Player	Position	Age	Destination Club	Notes	Ref
November 27, 2018	(United States) Conor Donovan	DF	22	(United States) Rio Grande Valley FC Toros	Contract option declined/Free transfer	
November 27, 2018	(Brazil) Leonardo	DF	30	(United States) Orange County SC	Contract option declined/Free transfer	
November 27, 2018	(Panama) Adolfo Machado	DF	33	(Bolivia) The Strongest	Contract option declined/Free transfer	
November 27, 2018	(United States) Mac Steeves	FW	24	(United States) Hartford Athletic	Contract option declined	
November 27, 2018	(United States) Jared Watts	DF	26	Retired	Contract option declined	
November 27, 2018	(El Salvador) Arturo Álvarez	MF	33	Retired	Contract expired	
November 27, 2018	(Switzerland) Philippe Senderos	DF	33	(Switzerland) FC Chiasso	Contract expired	
November 30, 2018	(United States) Andrew Wenger	DF/MF	27	Retired		
December 2, 2018	(United States) Dylan Remick	DF	27	Retired		
December 11, 2018	(United States) Eric Alexander	MF	30	(United States) FC Cincinnati	Selected in the 2018 MLS Expansion Draft	
December 31, 2018	(United States) Luis Gil	MF	25	(Mexico) Querétaro	End of loan	
January 11, 2019	(United States) Chris Seitz	GK	31	(United States) D.C. United	Traded for 2nd round pick in 2019 MLS SuperDraft	
August 6, 2019	(United States) Chris Duvall	DF	27	(United States) Oklahoma City Energy	Waived/Free Transfer	
August 13, 2019	(Colombia) Wilmer Cabrera	Manager	51	(Canada) Montreal Impact	Sacked	

=== MLS SuperDraft ===
Round	Pick	Player	Position	Age	College	Notes	Ref
1	8	(United States) Sam Junqua	DF	22	California		
2	33	(United States) Andrew Samuels	MF	21	Maryland	Signed with Houston's USL Championship affiliate club Rio Grand Valley FC	
3	56	(United States) Brad Dunwell	DF	22	Wake Forrest	Signed with Houston's USL Championship affiliate club Rio Grand Valley FC	

== Coaching staff ==
As of October 7, 2019

Position	Name
Head Coach	(United States) Davy Arnaud (Interim Head Coach)
First Assistant Coach	(United States) Michael Dellorusso
Goalkeeper Coach	(England) Paul Rogers
Sports Performance Director/Fitness Coach	(Republic of Ireland) Paul Caffrey
Assistant Fitness Coach	(United States) Steve Fell
Equipment Manager	(United States) Chris Maxwell
Assistant Equipment Manager	(Mexico) Eddie Cerda
Chief Medical Officer	(United States) David A. Braunreiter
Head Athletic Trainer	(United States) Chris Rumsey
Assistant Athletic Trainer	(United States) Casey Carlson
Head Physical Therapist	(United States) Nathan Hironymous
Massage Therapist	(United States) Wes Speights

== Non-competitive ==
=== Preseason friendlies ===
January 26, 2019 1	Houston Dynamo	1–0	Rio Grande Valley FC Toros	Houston, Texas
6:00 PM CST	Elis 24'	Report		Stadium: BBVA Compass Stadium; Attendance: 3,000+
Note: Two 30-minute periods, followed by one 30-minute period of RGV/Academy players.

January 29, 2019 2	Houston Dynamo	2–1	Rio Grande Valley FC Toros	Houston, Texas
10:00 AM CST	McNamara 48'; Hairston 88'	Report	Foster 30'	Stadium: Houston Sports Park; Attendance: Closed-door

February 6, 2019 3	Houston Dynamo	0–0	Minnesota United FC	Tucson, Arizona
CST	Quioto (yellow card) 43'	Report	Calvo (red card) 40'; Conner (yellow card) 108'	Stadium: Kino Sports Complex

February 9, 2019 4	Houston Dynamo	1–0	Seattle Sounders FC	Tucson, Arizona
11:00 AM CST	57' (o.g.)	Report		Stadium: Kino Sports Complex; Referee: Anthony Bersano
Note: 60-minute scrimmage.

February 9, 2019 5	Houston Dynamo	3–2	Seattle Sounders FC	Tucson, Arizona
6:00 PM CST	Cabezas (yellow card) 30', (goal) 71'; Vera (yellow card) 42'; Struna (red card) 64'; Peña 80'; Hairston 88'	Report	Lodeiro 14'; Ruidíaz 18'; Vargas (yellow card) 73'; Van Alstine (yellow card) 78'	Stadium: Kino Sports Complex; Referee: Alejandro Mariscal

February 13, 2019 6a	Houston Dynamo	1–4	Sporting Kansas City	Tucson, Arizona
5:00 PM CST	Alberth Elis 4'; Quioto (red card) 73'; Cabezas (yellow card) 38'	Report	Russell 11'; Gutiérrez 23'; Németh 28', 90+1' (yellow card) 33'; Espinoza (yellow card) 80' (yellow-red card) 87'	Stadium: Kino Sports Complex
Note: Matches played concurrently

February 13, 2019 6b	Houston Dynamo	1–1	Sporting Kansas City	Tucson, Arizona
5:00 PM CST	Rodriguez 52'	Report	Croizet 45'	Stadium: Kino Sports Complex
Note: Matches played concurrently

=== Midseason friendlies ===
TBD

== Competitive ==
=== MLS ===
==== Standings ====
===== Western Conference table =====
2019 MLS Western Conference standings
Pos	Team	Pld	W	L	T	GF	GA	GD	Pts
8	San Jose Earthquakes	34	13	16	5	51	52	−1	44
9	Colorado Rapids	34	12	16	6	57	60	−3	42
10	Houston Dynamo	34	12	18	4	45	57	−12	40
11	Sporting Kansas City	34	10	16	8	49	67	−18	38
12	Vancouver Whitecaps FC	34	8	16	10	37	58	−21	34

Source: MLS
Rules for classification: 1) points; 2) total wins; 3) total goal differential; 4) total goals scored; 5) disciplinary points; 6) away goal differential; 7) away goals scored; 8) home goals scored; 9) home goal differential; 10) coin toss or drawing of lots

===== Overall table =====
2019 MLS regular season standings
Pos	Team	Pld	W	L	T	GF	GA	GD	Pts	
17	Chicago Fire	34	10	12	12	55	47	+8	42	
18	Montreal Impact (V)	34	12	17	5	47	60	−13	41	Qualification for the CONCACAF Champions League
19	Houston Dynamo	34	12	18	4	49	59	−10	40	
20	Columbus Crew SC	34	10	16	8	39	47	−8	38	
21	Sporting Kansas City	34	10	16	8	49	67	−18	38	

Source: MLS
Rules for classification: 1) points; 2) total wins; 3) total goal differential; 4) total goals scored; 5) disciplinary points; 6) away goals scored; 7) away goal differential; 8) coin toss or drawing of lots
(V) Canadian Championship winners

===== Match results =====
March 2, 2019 1	Houston Dynamo	1–1	Real Salt Lake	Houston, Texas
5:00 PM CST	K. Garcia (yellow card) 30'; Vera (yellow card) 31' (yellow-red card) 82'; Manotas 62'	Report	Luiz (yellow card) 11'; Beckerman (yellow card) 14'; Herrera (yellow card) 27'; Rusnák 40'; Johnson (yellow card) 90+3'	Stadium: BBVA Compass Stadium; Attendance: 16,827; Referee: Armando Villarreal

March 9, 2019 2	Houston Dynamo	2–1	Montreal Impact	Houston, Texas
4:00 PM CST	Rodríguez 36'; B. García (yellow card) 74'; Quioto (yellow card) 77'; Manotas 86'	Report	Taïder 34'; Sagna (yellow card) 77'; Cabrera (yellow card) 88'	Stadium: BBVA Compass Stadium; Attendance: 12,601; Referee: Ismail Elfath

March 16, 2019 3	Houston Dynamo	3–2	Vancouver Whitecaps FC	Houston, Texas
2:00 PM CDT	Rodríguez 19', (yellow card) 49', (goal) 73'; Elis 42' (pen.); Quioto (yellow card) 83'; Manotas (yellow card) 90'	Report	Montero 35' (pen.); Lass 54'; PC (yellow card) 82'	Stadium: BBVA Compass Stadium; Attendance: 13,549; Referee: Nima Saghafi

March 30, 2019 4	Colorado Rapids	1–4	Houston Dynamo	Commerce City, Colorado
2:00 PM CDT	Rubio (yellow card) 40'; Feilhaber (yellow card) 75'; Kamara 81' (pen.); Smith (red card) 89'	Report	Rodríguez 4'; Sjöberg 15' (o.g.); Rosenberry 34' (o.g.); Figueroa (yellow card) 59'; Elis 67'; Lundqvist (yellow card) 90+2'	Stadium: Dick's Sporting Goods Park; Attendance: 11,061; Referee: Marcos DeOliveira

April 13, 2019 5	Houston Dynamo	2–1	San Jose Earthquakes	Houston, Texas
2:00 PM CDT	Figueroa (yellow card) 30'; Elis 52', (yellow card) 53'; Martínez 60'; Lundqvist (yellow card) 69'	Report	Thompson (yellow card) 28'; Godoy (yellow card) 34'; Yueill 56'; López (red card) 87'	Stadium: BBVA Compass Stadium; Attendance: 14,476; Referee: Baldomero Toledo

April 19, 2019 6	LA Galaxy	2–1	Houston Dynamo	Carson, California
9:30 PM CDT	Ibrahimović 31' (pen.); Polenta 88'	Report	DeLaGarza (yellow card) 29'; Figueroa (yellow card) 47'; Elis 53' (pen.), (yellow card) 85'	Stadium: Dignity Health Sports Park; Attendance: 21,503; Referee: Jair Marrufo

April 27, 2019 7	Houston Dynamo	2–0	Columbus Crew SC	Houston, Texas
7:30 PM CDT	Manotas 3'; Martínez 55'	Report	Francis (yellow card) 51'	Stadium: BBVA Compass Stadium; Attendance: 15,557; Referee: Allen Chapman

May 4, 2019 8	Houston Dynamo	2–1	FC Dallas	Houston, Texas
3:00 PM CDT	Manotas 20' (pen.), 58'; B. García (yellow card) 27'; McNamara (yellow card) 88'; Cabezas (yellow card) 90+6'	Report	González (yellow card) 20'; Barrios (yellow card) 45+4'; Cannon (yellow card) 77'; Cerrillo (yellow card) 81'; Badji 87'	Stadium: BBVA Compass Stadium; Attendance: 16,521; Referee: Alan Kelly

May 11, 2019 9	Seattle Sounders FC	1–0	Houston Dynamo	Seattle, Washington
9:00 PM CDT	Roldan 5'; Bruin (yellow card) 78'	Report	Cerén (yellow card) 28'; DeLaGarza (yellow card) 59'; Fuenmayor (yellow card) 90+2'	Stadium: CenturyLink Field; Attendance: 39,232; Referee: Alex Chilowicz

May 15, 2019 10	Houston Dynamo	1–1	Portland Timbers	Houston, Texas
7:30 PM CDT	Manotas 40'; Figueroa (yellow card) 47'	Report	Zambrano (yellow card) 42'; Fernández 77'; Blanco (yellow card) 79'	Stadium: BBVA Compass Stadium; Attendance: 13,327; Referee: Ted Unkel

May 18, 2019 11	Houston Dynamo	2–1	D.C. United	Houston, Texas
7:30 PM CDT	Martínez (yellow card) 38'; Rodríguez 67'; McNamara 68'; Struna (yellow card) 90+5'	Report	Rooney 46'; Canouse (yellow card) 76'; Arriola (red card) 85'	Stadium: BBVA Compass Stadium; Attendance: 15,811; Referee: Rubiel Vazquez

May 25, 2019 12	Minnesota United FC	1–0	Houston Dynamo	Saint Paul, Minnesota
7:00 PM CDT	Métanire 20', (yellow card) 90'	Report	Fuenmayor (yellow card) 40'; B. García (yellow card) 66'	Stadium: Allianz Field; Attendance: 19,701; Referee: Joseph Dickerson

June 1, 2019 13	Houston Dynamo	1–1	Sporting Kansas City	Houston, Texas
7:30 PM CDT	Elis 69'	Report	Croizet 63'	Stadium: BBVA Compass Stadium; Attendance: 15,710; Referee: Kevin Stott

June 22, 2019 14	Portland Timbers	4–0	Houston Dynamo	Portland, Oregon
10:00 PM CDT	Cascante (yellow card) 12'; Chara (yellow card) 31'; Loría 39'; Valeri (yellow card) 54', (goal) 61' (pen.); Fernández 63'; Ebobisse 75'	Report	Martínez (yellow card) 16'; Peña (yellow card) 34'; Vera (yellow card) 47'	Stadium: Providence Park; Attendance: 25,218; Referee: Alan Kelly

June 26, 2019 15	San Jose Earthquakes	2–0	Houston Dynamo	San Jose, California
9:30 PM CDT	Qazaishvili 22', 75'; Kashia (yellow card) 77'	Report	Peña (yellow card) 17'; DeLaGarza (yellow card) 57'; McNamara (yellow card) 90+3'	Stadium: Avaya Stadium; Attendance: 15,563; Referee: Robert Sibiga

June 29, 2019 16	New England Revolution	2–1	Houston Dynamo	Foxborough, Massachusetts
6:30 PM CDT	Mlinar (yellow card) 45', (goal) 52'; Farrell (yellow card) 54'; Agudelo (yellow card) 83'; Bunbury 90'	Report	Cerén 25'; Quioto (yellow card) 43'; Cabezas (yellow card) 81'; Fuenmayor (yellow card) 85'	Stadium: Gillette Stadium; Attendance: 17,372; Referee: Silviu Petrescu

July 3, 2019 17	Houston Dynamo	4–0	New York Red Bulls	Houston, Texas
8:00 PM CDT	Manotas 39'; Quioto (yellow card) 41'; Martínez 56'; DeLaGarza (yellow card) 70'; Elis 72', 90+4'; Figueroa (red card) 90+4'	Report	Murillo (yellow card) 44' (yellow-red card) 83'; Duncan (yellow card) 63'; Cásseres (yellow card) 68'; Kaku (red card) 90+4'	Stadium: BBVA Compass Stadium; Attendance: 19,531; Referee: Baldomero Toledo

July 6, 2019 18	FC Cincinnati	3–2	Houston Dynamo	Cincinnati, Ohio
6:30 PM CDT	Manneh 29'; Dally 38'; Amaya (yellow card) 32'; Ulloa 61'	Report	Elis (yellow card) 19'; Cabezas (yellow card) 25'; Quioto 79' (pen.); Hagglund 81' (o.g.)	Stadium: Nippert Stadium; Attendance: 26,276; Referee: David Gantar

July 12, 2019 19	Houston Dynamo	1–3	Los Angeles FC	Houston, Texas
8:00 PM CDT	Quioto 3'; Figueroa (yellow card) 83'	Report	Diomande 45+2', 49'; Jakovic (yellow card) 71'; Rossi 88'	Stadium: BBVA Compass Stadium; Attendance: 17,219; Referee: Armando Villarreal

July 17, 2019 20	Atlanta United FC	5–0	Houston Dynamo	Atlanta, Georgia
6:00 PM CDT	Nagbe 27'; Vazquez 29'; J. Martínez 60', 79'; Gressel 88'	Report	Elis (yellow card) 6' (yellow-red card) 6'; Vera (yellow card) 45+2'; Quioto (yellow card) 79'	Stadium: Mercedes-Benz Stadium; Attendance: 42,557; Referee: Chris Penso

July 20, 2019 21	Toronto FC	1–3	Houston Dynamo	Toronto, Ontario
7:00 PM CDT	Altidore 75'	Report	McNamara 4'; Martínez 23'; Manotas 57'	Stadium: BMO Field; Attendance: 25,949; Referee: Alex Chilowicz

July 27, 2019 22	Houston Dynamo	0–1	Seattle Sounders FC	Houston, Texas
7:00 PM CDT	Peña (yellow card) 82'	Report	Delem (yellow card) 50'; Morris 59'; Shipp (yellow card) 72'	Stadium: BBVA Compass Stadium; Attendance: 15,138; Referee: Nima Saghafi

August 3, 2019 23	Houston Dynamo	0–1	Chicago Fire	Houston, Texas
8:00 PM CDT	Elis (yellow card) 44'; Vera (yellow card) 46'	Report	Nikolić 45+3'; Bronico (yellow card) 53'; McCarty (yellow card) 67'	Stadium: BBVA Compass Stadium; Attendance: 14,250; Referee: Ramy Touchan

August 8, 2019 24	New York City FC	3–2	Houston Dynamo	New York, New York
6:00 PM CDT	Mitriță 16'; Miller (yellow card) 42'; Ring (yellow card) 45+3'; Castellanos 83', 90+3', (yellow card) 90+4'	Report	Cabezas 26'; Quioto (red card) 29'; Rodríguez (yellow card) 38'; Struna (yellow card) 62'; Manotas 77'; Lundqvist (yellow card) 82'; Vera (yellow card) 86'	Stadium: Yankee Stadium; Attendance: 18,113; Referee: Robert Sibiga

August 11, 2019 25	Philadelphia Union	2–1	Houston Dynamo	Chester, Pennsylvania
5:00 PM CDT	Przybylko 18'; Elliott 78'	Report	Figueroa (yellow card) 34'; Ramirez 42'; Cabezas (yellow card) 58'	Stadium: Talen Energy Stadium; Attendance: 18,550; Referee: Marcos de Oliveira

August 17, 2019 26	Houston Dynamo	2–2	Colorado Rapids	Houston, Texas
8:00 PM CDT	Lundqvist (yellow card) 2'; Manotas 74', 79'	Report	Rubio 7', 38'; Price (yellow card) 25'; Smith (yellow card) 76'; Vines (yellow card) 81'	Stadium: BBVA Compass Stadium; Attendance: 15,458; Referee: Ismail Elfath

August 24, 2019 27	FC Dallas	5–1	Houston Dynamo	Frisco, Texas
7:00 PM CDT	Ziegler 24' (pen.); Badji (yellow card) 28'; Ferreira 29', (yellow card) 33'; Ondrášek 56', 64'; Barrios 90+6'	Report	Elis (yellow card) 15'; Bizama (yellow card) 23'; Rodríguez 80'	Stadium: Toyota Stadium; Attendance: 15,452; Referee: Armando Villarreal

August 31, 2019 28	Sporting Kansas City	1–0	Houston Dynamo	Kansas City, Kansas
7:30 PM CDT	Russell 12'; Gutiérrez (yellow card) 47'	Report	B. García (yellow card) 61'; DeLaGarza (yellow card) 65'; Vera (yellow card) 89'; Figueroa (yellow card) 90+3'	Stadium: Children's Mercy Park; Attendance: 18,917; Referee: Alan Kelly

September 11, 2019 29	Houston Dynamo	2–0	Minnesota United FC	Houston, Texas
7:30 PM CDT	Manotas 37'; Ramirez 44'; Rodríguez (yellow card) 82'	Report	Gasper (yellow card) 26'	Stadium: BBVA Compass Stadium; Attendance: 13,166; Referee: Timothy Ford

September 14, 2019 30	Vancouver Whitecaps FC	2–1	Houston Dynamo	Vancouver, British Columbia
9:00 PM CDT	Ali Adnan (yellow card) 30'; In-beom 54' (pen.), (yellow card) 66'; Montero 90'	Report	Vera (yellow card) 42'; Manotas 78'	Stadium: BC Place; Attendance: 17,382; Referee: Robert Sibiga

September 21, 2019 31	Houston Dynamo	2–1	Orlando City SC	Houston, Texas
7:30 PM CDT	Elis 70'; Ramirez 73'	Report	Dwyer 6'; Higuita (yellow card) 60'	Stadium: BBVA Compass Stadium; Attendance: 15,146; Referee: Rubiel Vazquez

September 25, 2019 32	Los Angeles FC	3–1	Houston Dynamo	Los Angeles, California
9:30 PM CDT	Vela 23' (pen.); El-Munir (yellow card) 56'; Rossi 70', (yellow card) 80'; Atuesta (yellow card) 75', (goal) 82'	Report	Miller 28' (o.g.); Struna (yellow card) 33'; Vera (yellow card) 81'	Stadium: Banc of California Stadium; Referee: Ramy Touchan

September 29, 2019 33	Real Salt Lake	2–1	Houston Dynamo	Sandy, Utah
6:30 PM CDT	Baird 1'; Savarino (yellow card) 29' (goal) 75'	Report	Martínez 32'; McNamara (yellow card) 87'	Stadium: Rio Tinto Stadium; Attendance: 18,117; Referee: Alex Chilowicz

October 6, 2019 34	Houston Dynamo	4–2	LA Galaxy	Houston, Texas
3:00 PM CDT	Ramírez 45+2', 83'; Elis 62'; B. García (yellow card) 70'; Rodríguez 90+4'	Report	Ibrahimović 9'; Feltscher (yellow card) 45+1'; Pavón 54'	Stadium: BBVA Compass Stadium; Attendance: 21,777; Referee: Allen Chapman

=== U.S. Open Cup ===
As a member of MLS, the Dynamo will enter the competition at the fourth round, scheduled to be played on June 11, 2019.

June 11, 2019 Fourth round	Houston Dynamo (Texas)	3–2	(Texas) Austin Bold FC	Houston, Texas
7:00 PM CDT	Martínez 14'; Peña 31'; Vera 40'; Cabezas (yellow card) 65'; Duvall (yellow card) 70'; O. García (yellow card) 88'	Report	Guadarrama (yellow card) 42'; Báez 48', (yellow card) 51'; Saramutin (yellow card) 49'; Promise 58'; Taylor (yellow card) 86'	Stadium: BBVA Compass Stadium; Attendance: 4,765; Referee: Elton Garcia

June 18, 2019 Round of Sixteen	Houston Dynamo (Texas)	2–3	Minnesota United FC	Houston, Texas
6:00 PM CDT	Peña 9'; Martínez 37'; Fuenmayor (yellow card) 40'	Report	Boxall (yellow card) 20'; Quintero 66', 82'; Toye 89'; Olum (yellow card) 90+4'	Stadium: BBVA Compass Stadium; Attendance: 4,559; Referee: Farhad Dadkho

=== CONCACAF Champions League ===
==== Round of 16 ====
February 19, 2019 First leg	Guastatoya (Guatemala)	0–1	(United States) Houston Dynamo	Guatemala City, Guatemala
9:00 PM CST	Ramírez (yellow card) 21'; Aparicio (yellow card) 87'	Report	Beasley 84'	Stadium: Estadio Flores; Referee: Kimbell Ward

February 26, 2019 Second leg	Houston Dynamo (United States)	2–1 (3–1 agg.)	(Guatemala) Guastatoya	Houston, United States
7:00 PM CST	Peña (yellow card) 66'; Manotas 77', 85'; Vera (yellow card) 88'	Report	Cincotta (yellow card) 33'; Aparicio (yellow card) 63'; Navarro 72'; Domínguez (yellow card) 84'	Stadium: BBVA Compass Stadium; Attendance: 10,021; Referee: Hector Martinez

==== Quarter-finals ====
March 5, 2019 First leg	Houston Dynamo (United States)	0–2	(Mexico) UANL	Houston, United States
7:00 PM CST	Elis (yellow card) 63'; García (yellow card) 90+2'	Report	Torres (yellow card) 60'; Valencia 78'; Quiñones 81'; Rodríguez (yellow card) 86'; Vargas (yellow card) 90+3'	Stadium: BBVA Compass Stadium; Referee: Iván Arcides Barton Cisneros

March 12, 2019 Second leg	UANL (Mexico)	1–0 (3–0 agg.)	(United States) Houston Dynamo	San Nicolás de los Garza, Mexico
11:00 PM CST	Salcedo 68'	Report	Figueroa (yellow card) 45+1'; Vera (yellow card) 55'; Struna (yellow card) 64'	Stadium: Estadio Universitario; Attendance: 41,615; Referee: Yadel Martinez

=== Leagues Cup ===
July 24, 2019 Quarterfinal	Houston Dynamo (United States)	1–1 (5–6 p)	(Mexico) América	Houston, United States
7:30 PM CDT	Salazar (yellow card) 40'; Fuenmayor (yellow card) 64'; Beasley 85'		Bruno Valdez (yellow card) 43'; Benedetti 73', (yellow card) 88'; Uribe (yellow card) 76'	Stadium: BBVA Compass Stadium; Attendance: 20,315; Referee: Walter López Castellanos
	Penalties
	Quioto (penalty missed); Cerén (penalty scored); Elis (penalty scored); Cabezas (penalty scored); Bird (penalty scored); K. Garcia (penalty scored); Junqua (penalty missed)		Castillo (penalty scored); Aguilera (penalty scored); Uribe (penalty scored); Ibargüen (penalty scored); Martínez (penalty missed); Benedetti (penalty scored) dos Santos (penalty scored)

== Player statistics ==
=== Appearances, goals, and assists ===
No.	Pos	Nat	Player	Total			MLS			US Open Cup			CONCACAF Champions League			Leagues Cup		
No.	Pos	Nat	Player	Apps	Goals	Assists	Apps	Goals	Assists	Apps	Goals	Assists	Apps	Goals	Assists	Apps	Goals	Assists
1	GK	(United States)	Tyler Deric	9	0	0	7	0	0	1	0	0	0	0	0	1	0	0
2	DF	(Venezuela)	Alejandro Fuenmayor	12	0	1	8	0	1	2	0	1	1	0	0	1	0	0
3	DF	(Sweden)	Adam Lundqvist	29	0	4	28	0	4	0	0	0	1	0	0	0	0	0
5	MF	(Colombia)	Juan David Cabezas	19	1	0	15	1	0	2	0	0	1	0	0	1	0	0
6	DF	(Slovenia)	Aljaž Struna	32	0	1	29	0	1	0	0	0	3	0	0	0	0	0
7	DF	(United States)	DaMarcus Beasley	18	2	2	12	0	2	1	0	0	4	1	0	1	1	0
8	MF	(United States)	Memo Rodríguez	28	7	5	26	7	5	0	0	0	1	0	0	1	0	0
9	FW	(Colombia)	Mauro Manotas	36	15	8	32	13	8	0	0	0	4	2	0	0	0	0
10	MF	(Argentina)	Tomás Martínez	37	7	4	33	5	3	2	2	1	2	0	0	0	0	0
11	MF	(United States)	Tommy McNamara	39	2	3	33	2	3	2	0	0	4	0	0	0	0	0
12	FW	(Denmark)	Niko Hansen	4	0	0	4	0	0	0	0	0	0	0	0	0	0	0
12	DF	(United States)	Chris Duvall	4	0	0	1	0	0	2	0	0	0	0	0	1	0	0
13	FW	(United States)	Christian Ramirez	10	5	1	10	5	1	0	0	0	0	0	0	0	0	0
14	MF	(United States)	Marlon Hairston	18	0	1	12	0	0	2	0	1	3	0	0	1	0	0
15	DF	(Honduras)	Maynor Figueroa	29	0	3	25	0	3	0	0	0	4	0	0	0	0	0
16	DF	(United States)	Kevin Garcia	16	0	1	12	0	1	2	0	0	1	0	0	1	0	1
17	FW	(Honduras)	Alberth Elis	31	9	11	26	9	10	0	0	0	4	0	1	1	0	0
18	DF	(Chile)	José Bizama	5	0	1	5	0	1	0	0	0	0	0	0	0	0	0
19	FW	(Belize)	Michael Salazar	10	0	0	7	0	0	2	0	0	0	0	0	1	0	0
20	DF	(Guam)	A. J. DeLaGarza	27	0	1	23	0	1	0	0	0	4	0	0	0	0	0
21	FW	(Venezuela)	Ronaldo Peña	8	2	1	4	0	0	2	2	1	2	0	0	0	0	0
22	MF	(Argentina)	Matías Vera	36	1	1	30	0	1	2	1	0	4	0	0	0	0	0
23	GK	(United States)	Joe Willis	31	0	0	27	0	0	0	0	0	4	0	0	0	0	0
24	MF	(El Salvador)	Darwin Cerén	16	1	0	13	1	0	0	0	0	2	0	0	1	0	0
25	MF	(United States)	Eric Bird	2	0	0	0	0	0	1	0	0	0	0	0	1	0	0
26	GK	(United States)	Michael Nelson	1	0	0	0	0	0	1	0	0	0	0	0	0	0	0
27	MF	(Honduras)	Boniek García	37	0	1	32	0	1	2	0	0	3	0	0	0	0	0
28	DF	(United States)	Erik McCue	0	0	0	0	0	0	0	0	0	0	0	0	0	0	0
29	DF	(United States)	Sam Junqua	2	0	0	0	0	0	1	0	0	0	0	0	1	0	0
31	MF	(Honduras)	Romell Quioto	23	2	2	18	2	2	0	0	0	4	0	0	1	0	0
34	FW	(Panama)	Carlos Small (Note: Short term loan from RGVFC)	1	0	0	0	0	0	1	0	0	0	0	0	0	0	0

Source: Season Statistics and Match reports in Competitive

=== Disciplinary record ===
No.	Pos	Nat	Player	Total		MLS		US Open Cup		CONCACAF Champions League		Leagues Cup	
No.	Pos	Nat	Player	Yellow card	Red card	Yellow card	Red card	Yellow card	Red card	Yellow card	Red card	Yellow card	Red card
1	GK	(United States)	Tyler Deric	0	0	0	0	0	0	0	0	0	0
2	DF	(Venezuela)	Alejandro Fuenmayor	5	0	3	0	1	0	0	0	1	0
3	DF	(Sweden)	Adam Lundqvist	4	0	4	0	0	0	0	0	0	0
5	MF	(Colombia)	Juan David Cabezas	5	0	4	0	1	0	0	0	0	0
6	DF	(Slovenia)	Aljaž Struna	5	0	4	0	0	0	1	0	0	0
7	DF	(United States)	DaMarcus Beasley	0	0	0	0	0	0	0	0	0	0
8	MF	(United States)	Memo Rodríguez	3	0	3	0	0	0	0	0	0	0
9	FW	(Colombia)	Mauro Manotas	0	0	0	0	0	0	0	0	0	0
10	MF	(Argentina)	Tomás Martínez	2	0	2	0	0	0	0	0	0	0
11	MF	(United States)	Tommy McNamara	3	0	3	0	0	0	0	0	0	0
12	FW	(Denmark)	Niko Hansen	0	0	0	0	0	0	0	0	0	0
12	DF	(United States)	Chris Duvall	1	0	0	0	1	0	0	0	0	0
13	FW	(United States)	Christian Ramirez	0	0	0	0	0	0	0	0	0	0
14	MF	(United States)	Marlon Hairston	0	0	0	0	0	0	0	0	0	0
15	DF	(Honduras)	Maynor Figueroa	7	1	6	1	0	0	1	0	0	0
16	DF	(United States)	Kevin Garcia	1	0	1	0	0	0	0	0	0	0
17	FW	(Honduras)	Alberth Elis	7	1	6	1	0	0	1	0	0	0
18	DF	(Chile)	José Bizama	1	0	1	0	0	0	0	0	0	0
19	FW	(Belize)	Michael Salazar	1	0	0	0	0	0	0	0	1	0
20	DF	(Guam)	A. J. DeLaGarza	6	0	6	0	0	0	0	0	0	0
21	FW	(Venezuela)	Ronaldo Peña	4	0	3	0	0	0	1	0	0	0
22	MF	(Argentina)	Matías Vera	11	1	9	1	0	0	2	0	0	0
23	GK	(United States)	Joe Willis	0	0	0	0	0	0	0	0	0	0
24	MF	(El Salvador)	Darwin Cerén	1	0	1	0	0	0	0	0	0	0
25	MF	(United States)	Eric Bird	0	0	0	0	0	0	0	0	0	0
26	GK	(United States)	Michael Nelson	0	0	0	0	0	0	0	0	0	0
27	MF	(Honduras)	Boniek García	8	0	6	0	1	0	1	0	0	0
28	DF	(United States)	Erik McCue	0	0	0	0	0	0	0	0	0	0
29	DF	(United States)	Sam Junqua	0	0	0	0	0	0	0	0	0	0
31	MF	(Honduras)	Romell Quioto	5	1	5	1	0	0	0	0	0	0
34	FW	(Panama)	Carlos Small	0	0	0	0	0	0	0	0	0	0

Source: Season Statistics and Match reports in Competitive
