= Designated Player Rule =

Major League Soccer rule

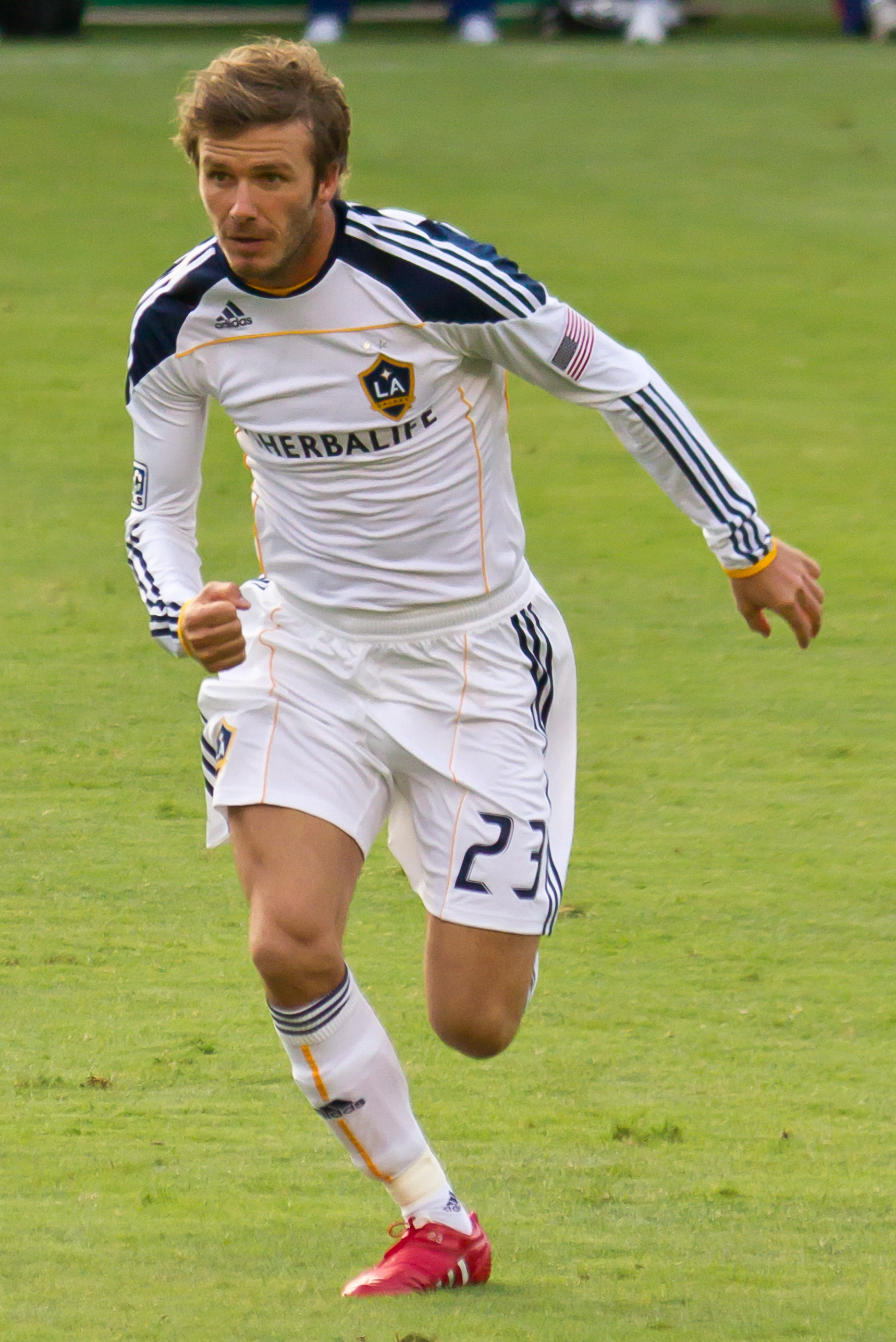
David Beckham was the league's first Designated Player, with the rule being nicknamed the "Beckham Rule".

The Designated Player Rule, nicknamed the Beckham Rule, allows Major League Soccer franchises to sign up to three players that would be considered outside their salary cap (either by offering the player higher wages or by paying a transfer fee for the player). The rule, which was adopted ahead of the 2007 MLS season, enables teams to compete for star players in the international football market. The rule is one of two mechanisms by which MLS teams may exceed their salary cap, the other being allocation money. As of January 2026, there have been 373 Designated Players in league history.

The rule is informally named after David Beckham, in anticipation of MLS teams signing lucrative deals with internationally recognized players, after Beckham entered into negotiations to join the league. Beckham was the first player signed under this rule, signing a five-year contract with the Los Angeles Galaxy in 2007 with a guaranteed annual salary of $6.5 million.

== History ==
The team salary cap was estimated to be around US$1.9 million in 2006, was $2.1 million in 2007, and was raised to $2.3 million for the 2008 season. As part of the 2010 Collective Bargaining Agreement between MLS and the MLS Players' Union, the 2010 salary cap was $2.55 million, with an automatic five percent increase each year until the expiration of the agreement at the end of the 2014 season.

Under the 2007 rule:

- The rule expires at the end of the 2009 season, and must be renewed then or allowed to lapse.
- For each Designated Player, $400,000 of his salary is charged to the salary cap and paid by the league, with any remaining salary being paid by the team's operator. This value was increased for the 2009 season to $415,000.
- Prior to the 2007 season, there were three players whose salary exceeded $400,000. These players were Landon Donovan, Carlos Ruiz, and Eddie Johnson. According to the rule, these players were grandfathered in for the 2007 season, and the exemption was extended after the 2007 season, with the league planning to review the issue at a future date. It was possible that the league would be required to renegotiate these players' contracts or consider them Designated Players. However, prior to the start of the 2008 season, Johnson moved to Fulham of the Premier League, while following Dwayne De Rosario's signing by Toronto FC in January 2009, Ruiz was released by the club and left MLS to play for Olimpia Asunción. This left Donovan as the lone player whose 2009 salary remained grandfathered under the exemption provision. However, there were several more players whose guaranteed salary exceeded the Designated Player amount, but whose salary cap expense was actually lower than their true salary due to the allocation rule. These players include Shalrie Joseph ($450,000), Christian Gomez ($430,000), Dwayne De Rosario ($425,750), and Taylor Twellman ($420,000).
- Each team initially had one Designated Player spot, but could trade their Designated Spot to another team; teams were allowed a maximum of two Designated Players.
- Only $325,000 of a team's second Designated Player counted against the salary cap, which was increased to $335,000 in 2009.

The 2010 changes:

- The rule has no expiration date.
- For each Designated Player, $335,000 of his salary is charged to the salary cap and paid by the league ($167,500 for DP players joining during the MLS summer transfer window), with any remaining salary being paid by the team's operator. This amount is halved for Designated Players signed in the middle of the season. The salary cap value of Designated Players can also be reduced using allocation money. Finally, teams whose Designated Players transfer abroad in the middle of a season can recoup part of the Designated Players' salary cap value.
- Landon Donovan is no longer grandfathered into the rule and must be considered a Designated Player.
- Each team is allowed two Designated Player spots, and they can no longer trade their Designated Player spots. The New York Red Bulls will receive $70,000 in allocation money in return for the nullification of their 2007 trade with Chivas USA for an additional Designated Player spot. This means that both New York and Chivas USA will have two Designated Player spots for the 2010 season.
- Teams can pay a $250,000 "luxury tax" for the right to sign a third Designated Player. This $250,000 would be distributed equally to all MLS teams that have not signed a third Designated Player in the form of allocation money.

The 2012 changes:

Starting with the 2012 season, the rule was changed with respect to younger players. MLS announced the changes in August 2011 after clubs expressed concern about signing young international players with no guarantees that they would develop into stars.

- Designated Players over the age of 23 will carry a salary budget charge of $350,000, unless the player joins his club in the middle of the season, in which case his budget charge will be $175,000.
- Designated Players 21–23 years old count as $200,000 against the club's salary budget.
- Designated Players 20 years old or younger count as $150,000 against the club's salary budget.
- The budget charge for the midseason signing of a young Designated Player (23 years old and younger) is $150,000 and this amount cannot be lowered with allocation funds.
- Clubs will not have to buy the third DP roster slot to accommodate Designated Players 23 years old and younger.
- Age of player is determined by year (not date) of birth.

The maximum budget charge for Designated Players over age 23 was increased to $368,750 for 2013, $387,500 in 2014, $436,250 in 2015, $457,500 in 2016, and $480,625 in 2017. The budget charge for those who join during the midseason transfer window has remained at one-half of the full-season cap charge since the inception of the rule. The budget charges for younger players have not changed since 2012.

== Background ==
The rule is informally named after David Beckham, in anticipation of MLS teams signing lucrative deals with internationally recognized players of Beckham's caliber. Beckham was the first player to be signed under this rule, signing a lucrative contract with the Los Angeles Galaxy worth up to $250 million over five years, with direct guaranteed compensation from MLS and Galaxy at $6.5 million a year.

== Current Designated Players ==
As of May 12, 2026

Year signed as DP	Player	Nationality	Current club	2026 guaranteed compensation
2017	Albert Rusnák	(Slovakia)	Seattle Sounders	$2,685,000
2019	Carles Gil	(Spain)	New England Revolution	$4,952,083
2020	Hany Mukhtar	(Germany)	Nashville SC	$5,411,667
2020	Cristian Espinoza	(Argentina)	Nashville SC	$2,343,567
2021	Ryan Gauld	(Scotland)	Vancouver Whitecaps	$3,675,000
2022	Thiago Martins	(Brazil)	New York City FC	$2,262,000
2022	Andrés Cubas	(Paraguay)	Vancouver Whitecaps	$1,153,333
2022	Denis Bouanga	(Gabon)	Los Angeles FC	$4,939,217
2023	João Klauss	(Brazil)	LA Galaxy	$2,915,000
2023	Evander	(Brazil)	FC Cincinnati	$4,736,411
2023	Martín Ojeda	(Argentina)	Orlando City	$1,778,200
2023	Riqui Puig ≠	(Spain)	LA Galaxy	$5,792,188
2023	Rafael Navarro	(Brazil)	St. Louis City SC	$1,449,600
2023	Lionel Messi	(Argentina)	Inter Miami	$28,333,333
2023	Sam Surridge	(England)	Nashville SC	$5,933,000
2024	Emil Forsberg	(Sweden)	New York Red Bulls	$6,035,625
2024	Pedro de la Vega	(Argentina)	Seattle Sounders	$1,379,000
2024	Petar Musa	(Croatia)	FC Dallas	$2,880,000
2024	Joseph Paintsil	(Ghana)	LA Galaxy	$4,502,000
2024	Liel Abada	(Israel)	Charlotte FC	$2,648,500
2024	Kelvin Yeboah	(Italy)	Minnesota United	$1,562,700
2024	Aleksei Miranchuk	(Russia)	Atlanta United	$5,085,441
2024	Joaquín Pereyra	(Argentina)	Minnesota United	$1,089,000
2025	Hirving Lozano	(Mexico)	LA Galaxy	$9,333,333
2025	Kévin Denkey	(Togo)	FC Cincinnati	$3,810,000
2025	Eric Maxim Choupo-Moting	(Cameroon)	New York Red Bulls	$3,530,667
2025	Brandon Vázquez	(United States)	Austin FC	$3,701,778
2025	Jordan Morris	(United States)	Seattle Sounders	$2,372,500
2025	Jonathan Bamba	(Ivory Coast)	Chicago Fire	$5,581,806
2025	Anders Dreyer	(Denmark)	San Diego FC	$3,561,251
2025	Myrto Uzuni	(Albania)	Austin FC	$2,305,000
2025	Miguel Almirón	(Paraguay)	Atlanta United	$7,871,000
2025	Dejan Joveljić	(Serbia)	Seattle Sounders	$3,306,250
2025	Marco Pašalić	(Croatia)	Orlando City	$1,650,667
2025	David Da Costa	(Portugal)	Portland Timbers	$3,425,000
2025	Bruno Damiani	(Uruguay)	Philadelphia Union	$847,600
2025	Nicolás Fernández	(Argentina)	New York City FC	$3,650,000
2025	Wessam Abou Ali≠	(Palestine)	Columbus Crew	$3,611,750
2025	Son Heung-min	(South Korea)	Los Angeles FC	$11,152,852
2025	Djordje Mihailovic	(United States)	Toronto FC	$2,828,204
2025	Kristoffer Velde	(Norway)	Portland Timbers	$3,027,000
2025	Paxten Aaronson	(United States)	Colorado Rapids	$2,228,063
2026	Rodrigo De Paul	(Argentina)	Inter Miami	$9,688,320
2026	Thomas Müller	(Germany)	Vancouver Whitecaps	$5,152,504
2026	Roman Bürki	(Switzerland)	St. Louis City SC	$2,750,000
2026	Justen Glad	(United States)	Real Salt Lake	$1,330,000
2026	Miles Robinson	(United States)	FC Cincinnati	$3,950,000
2026	Tai Baribo	(Israel)	D.C. United	$2,349,000
2026	Louis Munteanu	(Romania)	D.C. United	$1,634,100
2026	Guilherme	(Brazil)	Houston Dynamo	$1,925,230
2026	Facundo Torres	(Uruguay)	Austin FC	$4,405,000
2026	Timo Werner	(Germany)	San Jose Earthquakes	$4,268,039
2026	Mateusz Bogusz	(Poland)	Houston Dynamo	$2,521,048
2026	Germán Berterame	(Mexico)	Inter Miami	$3,824,200
2026	Jorge Ruvalcaba	(Mexico)	New York Red Bulls	$788,528
2026	Morgan Guilavogui	(Guinea)	Real Salt Lake	$2,225,500
2026	Josh Sargent	(United States)	Toronto FC	$5,265,667
2026	Santiago Moreno	(Colombia)	FC Dallas	$938,387
2026	Antoine Griezmann	(France)	Orlando City	$n/a
2026	Bénie Traoré	(Ivory Coast)	New York City FC	$n/a
2026	Robert Lewandowski	(Poland)	Chicago Fire	$n/a
2026	Brais Méndez	(Spain)	Columbus Crew	$n/a
2026	Allan Saint-Maximin	(France)	Charlotte FC	$n/a
2026	Kai Wagner	(Germany)	Philadelphia Union	$n/a
2026	Elias Achouri	(Tunisia)	San Diego FC	$n/a
2026	Jack Harrison	(England)	New England Revolution	$n/a
2026	Carlo Holse	(Denmark)	St. Louis City SC	$n/a
2026	Alexis Sánchez	(Chile)	CF Montréal	$n/a
2026	André Luiz	(Brazil)	Sporting Kansas City	$n/a
2026	Breel Embolo	(Switzerland)	Atlanta United	$n/a
2026	Eduard Löwen	(Germany)	San Jose Earthquakes	$1,444,250
2026	Santiago Rodríguez	(Uruguay)	Columbus Crew	$n/a
2026	Philip Zinckernagel	(Denmark)	Chicago Fire	$1,635,665
2026	Morgan Whittaker	(England)	Colorado Rapids	$n/a
2027	Mark McKenzie	(United States)	Philadelphia Union	$n/a

Notes

- Chart indicates when players signed their current Designated Player contract, not necessarily their first year in MLS.
- Other players in MLS may also be paid a salary that takes them above the Designated Player threshold, but they have had their salary reduced against the salary cap using General or Targeted Allocation Money.
- Player salaries may be below the Designated Player threshold, but their transfer fee might mean the total compensation takes them above the threshold.
- Player salaries include compensation from their MLS contract, not including any bonuses or compensation from contracts with individual teams or their affiliates.

† Player on loan at another club outside MLS
‡ Player on loan from another club inside MLS
≠ Player on season-ending injury list, so not necessarily an active Designated Player

== Club DP history ==
As of December 19, 2025

Notes

- The below list indicates players who have had their contract assigned as a Designated Player (DP) contract during their time in MLS. Players may have not always have had a DP contract, or have later had their contract negotiated below a DP level. Similarly, some players have been in MLS whose salary has been at a DP level, but the club has opted to bring their salary below the DP threshold using General Allocation Money or Targeted Allocation Money. Their listed "Years as DP" indicates what seasons they were active as a DP for that club only. Players in **bold** are currently signed to a DP contract by their club.
- Former MLS sides Miami Fusion and Tampa Bay Mutiny were dissolved before the introduction of the Designated Player Rule.

=== Atlanta United FC ===
Player	Previous club	Years as DP
(Paraguay) Héctor Villalba	(Argentina) San Lorenzo	2017
(Paraguay) **Miguel Almirón**	(Argentina) Lanús	2017–2018, 2025–
(Venezuela) Josef Martínez	(Italy) Torino	2017–2022
(Argentina) Esequiel Barco	(Argentina) Independiente	2018–2021
(Argentina) Pity Martínez	(Argentina) River Plate	2019–2020
(Argentina) Marcelino Moreno	(Argentina) Lanús	2020
(Argentina) Alan Franco	(Argentina) Independiente	2021
(Brazil) Luiz Araújo	(France) Lille	2021–2023
(Argentina) Thiago Almada	(Argentina) Vélez Sarsfield	2022–2024
(Greece) Giorgos Giakoumakis	(Scotland) Celtic	2023–2024
(Georgia (country)) Saba Lobzhanidze	(Turkey) Hatayspor	2023
(Norway) Stian Rode Gregersen	(France) Bordeaux	2024
(Russia) **Aleksei Miranchuk**	(Italy) Atalanta	2024–
(Ivory Coast) Emmanuel Latte Lath	(England) Middlesbrough	2025–2026
(Switzerland) **Breel Embolo**	(France) Rennes	2026–

=== Austin FC ===
Player	Previous club	Years as DP
(Paraguay) Cecilio Domínguez	(Argentina) Independiente	2021–2022
(Argentina) Tomás Pochettino	(Argentina) Talleres	2021
(Argentina) Sebastián Driussi	(Russia) Zenit Saint Petersburg	2021–2024
(Finland) Alexander Ring	(United States) New York City FC	2022–2024
(Argentina) Emiliano Rigoni	(Brazil) São Paulo	2022–2024
(Ghana) Osman Bukari	(Serbia) Red Star Belgrade	2024–2025
(United States) **Brandon Vázquez**	(Mexico) Monterrey	2025–
(Albania) **Myrto Uzuni**	(Spain) Granada	2025–
(Uruguay) **Facundo Torres**	(Brazil) Palmeiras	2026–

=== Charlotte FC ===
Player	Previous club	Years as DP
(Ecuador) Jordy Alcívar	(Ecuador) L.D.U. Quito	2022
(Poland) Karol Świderski	(Greece) PAOK	2022–2023, 2024
(Poland) Kamil Jóźwiak	(England) Derby County	2022–2023
(Argentina) Enzo Copetti	(Argentina) Racing Club	2023–2024
(Israel) **Liel Abada**	(Scotland) Celtic	2024–
(Spain) Pep Biel	(Greece) Olympiacos	2024
(Ivory Coast) Wilfried Zaha	(Turkey) Galatasaray	2025–2026
(France) **Allan Saint-Maximin**	(France) Lens	2026–

=== Chicago Fire FC ===
Player	Previous club	Years as DP
(Mexico) Cuauhtémoc Blanco	(Mexico) América	2007–2009
(Sweden) Freddie Ljungberg	(United States) Seattle Sounders	2010
(Mexico) Nery Castillo	(Ukraine) Shakhtar Donetsk	2010
(Uruguay) Álvaro Fernández	(United States) Seattle Sounders	2012–2013
(Netherlands) Sherjill MacDonald	(Belgium) Germinal Beerschot	2012–2013
(Uruguay) Federico Puppo	(Uruguay) Danubio	2012–2014
(Uruguay) Egidio Arévalo Ríos	(Mexico) Tijuana	2013
(Ecuador) Juan Luis Anangonó	(Ecuador) El Nacional	2013–2014
(Brazil) Gilberto	(Canada) Toronto FC	2015–2016
(Ghana) David Accam	(Sweden) Helsingborg	2015–2017
(Scotland) Shaun Maloney	(England) Wigan Athletic	2015
(Nigeria) Kennedy Igboananike	(Sweden) AIK	2015–2016
(Hungary) Nemanja Nikolić	(Poland) Legia Warsaw	2017–2019
(Germany) Bastian Schweinsteiger	(England) Manchester United	2017–2019
(Serbia) Aleksandar Katai	(Spain) Alavés	2019
(Slovenia) Robert Berić	(France) Saint-Étienne	2020–2021
(Argentina) Ignacio Aliseda	(Argentina) Defensa y Justicia	2020–2021
(Paraguay) Gastón Giménez	(Argentina) Vélez Sarsfield	2020–2022, 2024
(Switzerland) Xherdan Shaqiri	(France) Lyon	2022–2024
(Mexico) Jairo Torres	(Mexico) Atlas	2022–2023
(Ivory Coast) Ousmane Doumbia	(Switzerland) Lugano	2023
(Belgium) Hugo Cuypers	(Belgium) Gent	2024–2026
(Ivory Coast) **Jonathan Bamba**	(Spain) Celta Vigo	2025–
(Poland) **Robert Lewandowski**	(Spain) Barcelona	2026–
(Denmark) **Philip Zinckernagel**	(Belgium) Club Brugge	2026–

=== Chivas USA (defunct) ===
Player	Previous club	Years as DP
(Colombia) Juan Pablo Ángel	(United States) LA Galaxy	2011–2012
(Ecuador) Oswaldo Minda	(Ecuador) Deportivo Quito	2012–2014
(Grenada) Shalrie Joseph	(United States) New England Revolution	2012
(Mexico) Erick Torres	(Mexico) Guadalajara	2013–2014
(Argentina) Mauro Rosales	(United States) Seattle Sounders	2014

=== FC Cincinnati ===
Player	Previous club	Years as DP
(Nigeria) Fanendo Adi	(United States) Portland Timbers	2019
(Costa Rica) Allan Cruz	(Costa Rica) Herediano	2019–2020
(Japan) Yuya Kubo	(Belgium) Gent	2020, 2021–2022
(Curaçao) Jürgen Locadia	(England) Brighton & Hove Albion	2020–2021
(Brazil) Brenner	(Brazil) São Paulo	2021–2023
(Argentina) Luciano Acosta	(Mexico) Atlas	2021–2024
(Nigeria) Obinna Nwobodo	(Turkey) Göztepe	2022–2024
(Gabon) Aaron Boupendza	(Saudi Arabia) Al-Shabab	2023–2024
(Togo) **Kévin Denkey**	(Belgium) Cercle Brugge	2025–
(Brazil) **Evander**	(United States) Portland Timbers	2025–
(United States) **Miles Robinson**	(United States) Atlanta United	2026–

=== Colorado Rapids ===
Player	Previous club	Years as DP
(Panama) Gabriel Torres	(Venezuela) Zamora	2013–2015
(Argentina) Juan Ramírez	(Argentina) Argentinos Juniors	2015–2017
(Republic of Ireland) Kevin Doyle	(England) Wolverhampton Wanderers	2015–2016
(Albania) Shkëlzen Gashi	(Switzerland) Basel	2016–2018
(United States) Tim Howard	(England) Everton	2016–2019
(Denmark) Younes Namli	(Russia) Krasnodar	2020–2021
(United States) Gyasi Zardes	(United States) Columbus Crew	2022
(France) Kévin Cabral	(United States) LA Galaxy	2023–2025
(Denmark) Andreas Maxsø	(Denmark) Brøndby	2023
(Brazil) Rafael Navarro	(Brazil) Palmeiras	2023–2026
(United States) Djordje Mihailovic	(Netherlands) AZ	2023–2025
(United States) **Paxten Aaronson**	(Germany) Eintracht Frankfurt	2025–
(England) **Morgan Whittaker**	(England) Middlesbrough	2026–

=== Columbus Crew ===
Player	Previous club	Years as DP
(Argentina) Guillermo Barros Schelotto	(Argentina) Boca Juniors	2009–2010
(Peru) Andrés Mendoza	(Turkey) Diyarbakırspor	2010–2011
(Argentina) Federico Higuaín	(Argentina) Colón	2012–2019
(Sierra Leone) Kei Kamara	(England) Middlesbrough	2016
(Ghana) Jonathan Mensah	(Russia) Anzhi Makhachkala	2017
(Portugal) Pedro Santos	(Portugal) Braga	2017–2019
(United States) Gyasi Zardes	(United States) LA Galaxy	2019–2022
(United States) Darlington Nagbe	(United States) Atlanta United	2020–2025
(Armenia) Lucas Zelarayán	(Mexico) Tigres UANL	2020–2023
(Colombia) Cucho Hernández	(England) Watford	2022–2024
(Uruguay) Diego Rossi	(Turkey) Fenerbahçe	2023–2026
(Hungary) Dániel Gazdag	(United States) Philadelphia Union	2025–2026
(Palestine) **Wessam Abou Ali**	(Egypt) Al Ahly	2025–
(Spain) **Brais Méndez**	(Spain) Real Sociedad	2026–
(Uruguay) **Santiago Rodríguez**	(Brazil) Botafogo	2026–

=== FC Dallas ===
Player	Previous club	Years as DP
(Brazil) Denílson	(Saudi Arabia) Al-Nassr	2007
(Colombia) David Ferreira	(Brazil) Atlético Paranaense	2009–2013
(Colombia) Fabián Castillo	(Colombia) Deportivo Cali	2011–2015
(Canada) Julian de Guzman	(Canada) Toronto FC	2012
(France) Eric Hassli	(Canada) Toronto FC	2013
(Argentina) Mauro Díaz	(Argentina) River Plate	2013–2016
(Colombia) Andrés Escobar	(Ukraine) Dynamo Kyiv	2014
(Uruguay) David Texeira	(Netherlands) Groningen	2014–2015
(Ecuador) Carlos Gruezo	(Germany) VfB Stuttgart	2016–2018
(Ecuador) Aníbal Chalá	(Ecuador) El Nacional	2017
(Paraguay) Cristian Colmán	(Paraguay) Nacional Asunción	2017–2018
(Colombia) Santiago Mosquera	(Colombia) Millonarios	2018–2020
(Honduras) Bryan Acosta	(Spain) Tenerife	2019–2021
(Chile) Pablo Aránguiz	(Chile) Unión Española	2019
(Argentina) Franco Jara	(Mexico) Pachuca	2020–2022
(United States) Jesús Ferreira	(United States) FC Dallas Academy	2022–2024
(Argentina) Alan Velasco	(Argentina) Independiente	2022–2024
(Croatia) **Petar Musa**	(Portugal) Benfica	2024–
(Argentina) Luciano Acosta	(United States) FC Cincinnati	2025
(Colombia) **Santiago Moreno**	(Brazil) Fluminense	2026–

=== D.C. United ===
Player	Previous club	Years as DP
(Brazil) Luciano Emílio	(Honduras) Olimpia	2008–2009
(Argentina) Marcelo Gallardo	(France) Paris Saint-Germain	2008
(Montenegro) Branko Bošković	(Austria) Rapid Wien	2010–2012
(Canada) Dwayne De Rosario	(United States) New York Red Bulls	2011–2013
(Albania) Hamdi Salihi	(Austria) Rapid Wien	2012
(Brazil) Rafael Gladiador	(Brazil) Bahia	2013
(United States) Eddie Johnson	(United States) Seattle Sounders	2014–2015
(Argentina) Fabián Espíndola	(United States) New York Red Bulls	2015–2016
(United States) Paul Arriola	(Mexico) Tijuana	2017–2021
(England) Wayne Rooney	(England) Everton	2018–2019
(Argentina) Lucas Rodríguez	(Argentina) Estudiantes	2019
(Peru) Edison Flores	(Mexico) Morelia	2020–2022
(Greece) Taxiarchis Fountas	(Austria) Rapid Wien	2022–2023
(Iceland) Victor Pálsson	(Germany) Schalke 04	2022
(Belgium) Christian Benteke	(England) Crystal Palace	2022–
(Poland) Mateusz Klich	(England) Leeds United	2023–2025
(Finland) Matti Peltola	(Finland) HJK	2024
(Israel) **Tai Baribo**	(United States) Philadelphia Union	2026–
(Romania) **Louis Munteanu**	(Romania) CFR Cluj	2026–

=== Houston Dynamo FC ===
Player	Previous club	Years as DP
(Mexico) Luis Ángel Landín	(Mexico) Morelia	2009–2010
(Honduras) Boniek García	(Honduras) Olimpia	2012–2014
(Jamaica) Giles Barnes	(England) Doncaster Rovers	2012–2016
(Honduras) Alexander López	(Honduras) Olimpia	2013–2014
(United States) DaMarcus Beasley	(Mexico) Puebla	2014–2016
(Colombia) Mauro Manotas	(Colombia) Uniautónoma	2015–2016, 2020
(Mexico) Erick Torres	(Mexico) Guadalajara	2015–2017
(Honduras) Alberth Elis	(Mexico) Monterrey	2017–2020
(Argentina) Tomás Martínez	(Portugal) Braga	2017–2019
(Colombia) Darwin Quintero	(United States) Minnesota United	2020–2021
(Zimbabwe) Teenage Hadebe	(Turkey) Yeni Malatyaspor	2021–2023
(Paraguay) Sebastián Ferreira	(Paraguay) Libertad	2022–2024
(Mexico) Héctor Herrera	(Spain) Atlético Madrid	2022–2024
(Argentina) Ezequiel Ponce	(Greece) AEK Athens	2024–2026
(Brazil) Artur	(United States) Columbus Crew	2025
(Czech Republic) Ondřej Lingr	(Czech Republic) Slavia Prague	2025
(Brazil) **Guilherme**	(Brazil) Santos	2026–
(Poland) **Mateusz Bogusz**	(Mexico) Cruz Azul	2026–

=== Inter Miami CF ===
Player	Previous club	Years as DP
(Argentina) Matías Pellegrini	(Argentina) Estudiantes	2020
(Mexico) Rodolfo Pizarro	(Mexico) Monterrey	2020–2023
(Argentina) Gonzalo Higuaín	(Italy) Juventus	2020–2022
(France) Blaise Matuidi	(Italy) Juventus	2021
(Brazil) Gregore	(Brazil) Bahia	2021–2023
(Spain) Alejandro Pozuelo	(Canada) Toronto FC	2022
(Ecuador) Leonardo Campana	(England) Wolverhampton Wanderers	2023–2024
(Argentina) **Lionel Messi**	(France) Paris Saint-Germain	2023–
(Spain) Sergio Busquets	(Spain) Barcelona	2023–2025
(Spain) Jordi Alba	(Spain) Barcelona	2025
(Argentina) **Rodrigo De Paul**	(Spain) Atlético Madrid	2026–
(Mexico) **Germán Berterame**	(Mexico) Monterrey	2026–

=== Sporting Kansas City ===
Player	Previous club	Years as DP
(Argentina) Claudio López	(Argentina) Racing Club	2008
(Mexico) Omar Bravo	(Mexico) Guadalajara	2011
(Brazil) Jéferson	(Brazil) Vasco da Gama	2011
(Argentina) Claudio Bieler	(Ecuador) L.D.U. Quito	2013–2014
(United States) Matt Besler	(United States) University of Notre Dame	2014–2016
(United States) Graham Zusi	(United States) University of Maryland	2014–2017
(Honduras) Roger Espinoza	(England) Wigan Athletic	2015–2018
(Chile) Diego Rubio	(Spain) Valladolid	2016
(Guinea-Bissau) Gerso Fernandes	(Portugal) Belenenses	2017
(France) Yohan Croizet	(Belgium) Mechelen	2018–2019
(Chile) Felipe Gutiérrez	(Spain) Real Betis	2018–2020
(Scotland) Johnny Russell	(England) Derby County	2019–2024
(Mexico) Alan Pulido	(Mexico) Guadalajara	2020–2024
(Israel) Gadi Kinda	(Israel) Beitar Jerusalem	2021–2023
(Serbia) Nemanja Radoja	(Spain) Levante	2024
(Hungary) Dániel Sallói	(Hungary) Újpest	2024
(Serbia) Dejan Joveljić	(United States) LA Galaxy	2025–2026
(Spain) Manu García	(Greece) Aris	2025–2026
(Brazil) **André Luiz**	(Greece) Olympiacos	2026–

=== LA Galaxy ===
Player	Previous club	Years as DP
(England) David Beckham	(Spain) Real Madrid	2007–2012
(United States) Landon Donovan	(Germany) Bayer Leverkusen	2010–2014
(Colombia) Juan Pablo Ángel	(United States) New York Red Bulls	2011
(Republic of Ireland) Robbie Keane	(England) Tottenham Hotspur	2011–2016
(United States) Omar Gonzalez	(United States) University of Maryland	2013–2015
(England) Steven Gerrard	(England) Liverpool	2015–2016
(Mexico) Giovani dos Santos	(Spain) Villarreal	2015–2018
(Belgium) Jelle Van Damme	(Belgium) Standard Liège	2016–2017
(France) Romain Alessandrini	(France) Marseille	2017–2019
(Mexico) Jonathan dos Santos	(Spain) Villarreal	2017–2021
(Sweden) Zlatan Ibrahimović	(England) Manchester United	2019
(Argentina) Cristian Pavón	(Argentina) Boca Juniors	2020
(Mexico) Javier Hernández	(Spain) Sevilla	2020–2023
(France) Kévin Cabral	(France) Valenciennes	2021–2022
(Brazil) Douglas Costa	(Italy) Juventus	2022–2023
(Spain) **Riqui Puig**	(Spain) Barcelona	2023–
(Brazil) Gabriel Pec	(Brazil) Vasco da Gama	2024–2026
(Ghana) **Joseph Paintsil**	(Belgium) Genk	2024–
(Brazil) **João Klauss**	(United States) St. Louis City	2026–
(Mexico) **Hirving Lozano**	(United States) San Diego FC	2026–

=== Los Angeles FC ===
Player	Previous club	Years as DP
(Mexico) Carlos Vela	(Spain) Real Sociedad	2018–2023
(Uruguay) Diego Rossi	(Uruguay) Peñarol	2018–2021
(Portugal) André Horta	(Portugal) Benfica	2018–2019
(Uruguay) Brian Rodríguez	(Uruguay) Peñarol	2019–2021
(Gabon) **Denis Bouanga**	(France) Saint-Étienne	2022–
(Colombia) Eduard Atuesta	(Brazil) Palmeiras	2024
(France) Olivier Giroud	(Italy) AC Milan	2024–2025
(Turkey) Cengiz Ünder	(Turkey) Fenerbahçe	2025
(South Korea) **Son Heung-min**	(England) Tottenham Hotspur	2025–

=== Minnesota United FC ===
Player	Previous club	Years as DP
(Colombia) Darwin Quintero	(Mexico) América	2018–2019
(Colombia) Ángelo Rodríguez	(Colombia) Deportes Tolima	2018–2019
(Slovakia) Ján Greguš	(Denmark) Copenhagen	2019–2021
(Uruguay) Thomás Chacón	(Uruguay) Danubio	2019–2020
(Argentina) Emanuel Reynoso	(Argentina) Boca Juniors	2020–2024
(France) Adrien Hunou	(France) Rennes	2021–2022
(Paraguay) Luis Amarilla	(Argentina) Vélez Sarsfield	2022–2023
(Colombia) Ménder García	(Colombia) Once Caldas	2022–2023
(Finland) Teemu Pukki	(England) Norwich City	2023–2024
(Italy) **Kelvin Yeboah**	(Italy) Genoa	2024–
(Argentina) **Joaquín Pereyra**	(Argentina) Atlético Tucumán	2024–

=== CF Montréal ===
Player	Previous club	Years as DP
(Italy) Marco Di Vaio	(Italy) Bologna	2012–2014
(Argentina) Hernán Bernardello	(Spain) Almería	2013–2014
(Argentina) Ignacio Piatti	(Argentina) San Lorenzo	2014–2019
(Ivory Coast) Didier Drogba	(England) Chelsea	2015–2016
(Argentina) Lucas Ontivero	(Turkey) Galatasaray	2016
(Switzerland) Blerim Džemaili	(Italy) Bologna	2017
(Algeria) Saphir Taïder	(Italy) Bologna	2018–2020
(Kenya) Victor Wanyama	(England) Tottenham Hotspur	2020–2024
(Slovenia) Aljaž Struna	(United States) Houston Dynamo	2021
(United States) Djordje Mihailovic	(United States) Chicago Fire	2021
(Albania) Giacomo Vrioni	(United States) New England Revolution	2025
(Spain) Iván Jaime	(Portugal) Porto	2025–2026
(Chile) **Alexis Sánchez**	(Spain) Sevilla	2026–

=== Nashville SC ===
Player	Previous club	Years as DP
(Germany) **Hany Mukhtar**	(Denmark) Brøndby	2020–
(Costa Rica) Randall Leal	(Costa Rica) Saprissa	2020–2021
(Venezuela) Jhonder Cádiz	(Portugal) Benfica	2020–2021
(Ivory Coast) Aké Arnaud Loba	(Mexico) Monterrey	2021–2023
(United States) Walker Zimmerman	(United States) Los Angeles FC	2022–2025
(England) **Sam Surridge**	(England) Nottingham Forest	2023–
(Argentina) **Cristian Espinoza**	(United States) San Jose Earthquakes	2026–

=== New England Revolution ===
Player	Previous club	Years as DP
(Argentina) Milton Caraglio	(Argentina) Rosario Central	2011
(Grenada) Shalrie Joseph	(United States) New York Freedom	2012
(Honduras) Jerry Bengtson	(Honduras) Motagua	2012–2014
(United States) Jermaine Jones	(Turkey) Beşiktaş	2014–2015
(Portugal) José Gonçalves	(Switzerland) Sion	2016
(Ivory Coast) Xavier Kouassi	(Switzerland) Sion	2016–2017
(Sierra Leone) Kei Kamara	(United States) Columbus Crew	2016–2017
(France) Claude Dielna	(England) Sheffield Wednesday	2018
(Spain) **Carles Gil**	(Spain) Deportivo La Coruña	2019–
(Argentina) Gustavo Bou	(Mexico) Tijuana	2019–2023
(Poland) Adam Buksa	(Poland) Pogoń Szczecin	2020–2022
(Albania) Giacomo Vrioni	(Italy) Juventus	2022–2024
(Argentina) Tomás Chancalay	(Argentina) Racing Club	2024–2025
(United States) Matt Turner	(France) Lyon	2025–2026
(England) **Jack Harrison**	(England) Leeds United	2026–

=== New York City FC ===
Player	Previous club	Years as DP
(Spain) David Villa	(Spain) Atlético Madrid	2014–2018
(England) Frank Lampard	(England) Manchester City	2015–2016
(Italy) Andrea Pirlo	(Italy) Juventus	2015–2017
(Argentina) Maximiliano Moralez	(Mexico) León	2017–2021
(Paraguay) Jesús Medina	(Paraguay) Libertad	2018–2021
(Romania) Alexandru Mitriță	(Romania) Universitatea Craiova	2019–2020
(Brazil) Talles Magno	(Brazil) Vasco da Gama	2021–2026
(Brazil) **Thiago Martins**	(Japan) Yokohama F. Marinos	2022–
(Uruguay) Santiago Rodríguez	(Uruguay) Montevideo City Torque	2023–2025
(Argentina) **Nicolás Fernández**	(Spain) Elche	2025–
(Ivory Coast) **Bénie Traoré**	(Switzerland) FC Basel	2026–

=== New York Red Bulls ===
Player	Previous club	Years as DP
(United States) Claudio Reyna	(England) Manchester City	2007–2008
(Colombia) Juan Pablo Ángel	(England) Aston Villa	2007–2010
(France) Thierry Henry	(Spain) Barcelona	2010–2014
(Mexico) Rafael Márquez	(Spain) Barcelona	2010–2012
(Germany) Frank Rost	(Germany) Hamburger SV	2011
(Australia) Tim Cahill	(England) Everton	2012–2014
(England) Bradley Wright-Phillips	(England) Charlton Athletic	2015–2016, 2017–2019
(Argentina) Gonzalo Verón	(Argentina) San Lorenzo	2015–2017
(United States) Sacha Kljestan	(Belgium) Anderlecht	2016–2017
(Israel) Omer Damari	(Germany) RB Leipzig	2016
(Paraguay) Kaku	(Argentina) Huracán	2018–2021
(England) Josh Sims	(England) Southampton	2019–2020
(England) Dru Yearwood	(England) Brentford	2020–2021
(Poland) Patryk Klimala	(Scotland) Celtic	2021–2022
(Brazil) Luquinhas	(Poland) Legia Warsaw	2022–2023
(Belgium) Dante Vanzeir	(Belgium) Union SG	2023–2024
(Sweden) **Emil Forsberg**	(Germany) RB Leipzig	2024–
(Uruguay) Felipe Carballo	(Brazil) Grêmio	2024
(Cameroon) **Eric Maxim Choupo-Moting**	(Germany) Bayern Munich	2025–
(Mexico) **Jorge Ruvalcaba**	(Mexico) Pumas UNAM	2026–

=== Orlando City SC ===
Player	Previous club	Years as DP
(Brazil) Kaká	(Italy) Milan	2014–2017
(Colombia) Carlos Rivas	(Colombia) Deportivo Cali	2015–2017
(Honduras) Bryan Róchez	(Honduras) Real España	2015–2016
(Argentina) Matías Pérez García	(United States) San Jose Earthquakes	2016–2017
(Jamaica) Giles Barnes	(Canada) Vancouver Whitecaps	2017
(Peru) Yoshimar Yotún	(Sweden) Malmö FF	2017
(United States) Dom Dwyer	(United States) Sporting Kansas City	2018–2020
(United States) Sacha Kljestan	(United States) New York Red Bulls	2018
(Paraguay) Josué Colmán	(Paraguay) Cerro Porteño	2018–2019
(Portugal) Nani	(Portugal) Sporting CP	2019–2021
(Uruguay) Mauricio Pereyra	(Russia) Krasnodar	2019–2022
(Uruguay) Facundo Torres	(Uruguay) Peñarol	2022–2024
(Austria) Ercan Kara	(Austria) Rapid Wien	2022–2023
(Argentina) **Martín Ojeda**	(Argentina) Godoy Cruz	2023–
(Colombia) Luis Muriel	(Italy) Atalanta	2024–2025
(Croatia) **Marco Pašalić**	(Croatia) HNK Rijeka	2025–
(Paraguay) Braian Ojeda	(United States) Real Salt Lake	2026
(France) **Antoine Griezmann**	(Spain) Atlético Madrid	2026–

=== Philadelphia Union ===
Player	Previous club	Years as DP
(United States) Freddy Adu	(Portugal) Benfica	2011–2012
(Brazil) José Kléberson	(Brazil) Bahia	2013
(Argentina) Cristian Maidana	(Chile) Rangers de Talca	2014–2015
(United States) Maurice Edu	(England) Stoke City	2014–2017
(Venezuela) Fernando Aristeguieta	(France) Nantes	2015
(United States) Alejandro Bedoya	(France) Nantes	2016–2019
(Czech Republic) Bořek Dočkal	(China) Henan Jianye	2018
(Mexico) Marco Fabián	(Germany) Eintracht Frankfurt	2019
(Cape Verde) Jamiro Monteiro	(France) Metz	2020–2021
(Argentina) Julián Carranza	(United States) Inter Miami	2022–2024
(Denmark) Mikael Uhre	(Denmark) Brøndby	2022–2025
(Hungary) Dániel Gazdag	(Hungary) Budapest Honvéd	2023–2025
(Uruguay) **Bruno Damiani**	(Uruguay) Nacional	2025–
(Germany) **Kai Wagner**	(England) Birmingham City	2026–
(United States) **Mark McKenzie**	(France) Toulouse	2027–

=== Portland Timbers ===
Player	Previous club	Years as DP
(Colombia) Diego Chará	(Colombia) Deportes Tolima	2011–2013
(Scotland) Kris Boyd	(Turkey) Eskişehirspor	2012
(Argentina) Diego Valeri	(Argentina) Lanús	2013–2019
(Nigeria) Fanendo Adi	(Denmark) Copenhagen	2014–2015, 2016–2018
(England) Liam Ridgewell	(England) West Bromwich Albion	2014–2016
(Argentina) Lucas Melano	(Argentina) Lanús	2015–2016, 2019
(Argentina) Sebastián Blanco	(Argentina) San Lorenzo	2017–2023
(Argentina) Brian Fernández	(Mexico) Necaxa	2019
(Colombia) Yimmi Chará	(Brazil) Atlético Mineiro	2020–2023
(Poland) Jarosław Niezgoda	(Poland) Legia Warsaw	2020–2023
(Brazil) Evander	(Denmark) Midtjylland	2023–2024
(Uruguay) Jonathan Rodríguez	(Mexico) América	2024–2025
(Portugal) **David da Costa**	(France) Lens	2025–
(Norway) **Kristoffer Velde**	(Greece) Olympiacos	2025–
(Uruguay) Felipe Carballo	(Brazil) Grêmio	2025

=== Real Salt Lake ===
Player	Previous club	Years as DP
(Costa Rica) Álvaro Saborío	(Switzerland) Sion	2011–2015
(Argentina) Javier Morales	(Spain) Vecindario	2011–2015
(United States) Kyle Beckerman	(United States) Colorado Rapids	2015
(Ecuador) Joao Plata	(Canada) Toronto FC	2015–2016
(Chile) Sebastián Jaime	(Chile) Unión Española	2014–2015
(Argentina) Juan Manuel Martínez	(Argentina) Boca Juniors	2015–2016
(Armenia) Yura Movsisyan	(Russia) Spartak Moscow	2016–2017
(Slovakia) Albert Rusnák	(Netherlands) Groningen	2017–2021
(Venezuela) Jefferson Savarino	(Venezuela) Zulia (Brazil) Atlético Mineiro	2017–2019; 2022–2023
(Liberia) Sam Johnson	(Norway) Vålerenga	2019–2020
(Venezuela) Jeizon Ramírez	(Venezuela) Deportivo Táchira	2020–2021
(Croatia) Damir Kreilach	(Germany) Union Berlin	2020–2023
(Colombia) Cristian Arango	(Mexico) Pachuca	2023–2024
(Portugal) Diogo Gonçalves	(Denmark) Copenhagen	2024–2025
(Brazil) Rwan Cruz	(Brazil) Botafogo	2025
(United States) **Justen Glad**	(United States) Real Salt Lake Academy	2026–
(Guinea) **Morgan Guilavogui**	(France) Lens	2026–

=== St. Louis City SC ===
Player	Previous club	Years as DP
(Brazil) João Klauss	(Germany) TSG 1899 Hoffenheim	2023–2025
(Germany) Eduard Löwen	(Germany) Hertha BSC	2023–2024
(Germany) Marcel Hartel	(Germany) FC St. Pauli	2024–2026
(Switzerland) **Roman Bürki**	(Germany) Borussia Dortmund	2026–
(Denmark) **Carlo Holse**	(Turkey) Samsunspor	2026–
(Brazil) **Rafael Navarro**	(United States) Colorado Rapids	2026–

=== San Diego FC ===
Player	Previous club	Years as DP
(Mexico) Hirving Lozano	(Netherlands) PSV Eindhoven	2025–2026
(Denmark) **Anders Dreyer**	(Belgium) Anderlecht	2025–
(Tunisia) **Elias Achouri**	(Denmark) Copenhagen	2026–

=== San Jose Earthquakes ===
Player	Previous club	Years as DP
(Brazil) Geovanni	(England) Hull City	2010
(United States) Chris Wondolowski	(United States) Houston Dynamo	2013–2019
(Argentina) Matías Pérez García	(Argentina) Tigre	2014–2016
(Switzerland) Innocent Emeghara	(Azerbaijan) Qarabağ	2015–2016
(Jamaica) Simon Dawkins	(England) Derby County	2016–2017
(Georgia (country)) Valeri Qazaishvili	(Netherlands) Vitesse	2017–2020
(Sweden) Magnus Eriksson	(Sweden) Djurgårdens IF	2018
(Argentina) Cristian Espinoza	(Spain) Villarreal	2020–2025
(Mexico) Javier Eduardo López	(Mexico) Guadalajara	2021–2022
(Cape Verde) Jamiro Monteiro	(United States) Philadelphia Union	2022–2023
(Ecuador) Carlos Gruezo	(Germany) FC Augsburg	2023–2025
(Argentina) Hernán López	(Argentina) Godoy Cruz	2024–2025
(Colombia) Cristian Arango	(United States) Real Salt Lake	2025
(Germany) **Timo Werner**	(Germany) RB Leipzig	2026–
(Germany) **Eduard Löwen**	(United States) St. Louis City	2026–

=== Seattle Sounders FC ===
Player	Previous club	Years as DP
(Sweden) Freddie Ljungberg	(England) West Ham United	2009–2010
(Uruguay) Álvaro Fernández	(Uruguay) Nacional	2010–2012
(Switzerland) Blaise Nkufo	(Netherlands) Twente	2010
(Colombia) Fredy Montero	(Colombia) Deportivo Cali	2011-2012
(Argentina) Mauro Rosales	(Argentina) River Plate	2011–2013
(Germany) Christian Tiffert	(Germany) Kaiserslautern	2012–2013
(Grenada) Shalrie Joseph	(United States) Chivas USA	2013
(Nigeria) Obafemi Martins	(Spain) Levante	2013–2015
(United States) Clint Dempsey	(England) Tottenham Hotspur	2013–2018
(Cuba) Osvaldo Alonso	(United States) Charleston Battery	2014–2018
(Paraguay) Nelson Valdez	(Germany) Eintracht Frankfurt	2015–2016
(Uruguay) Nicolás Lodeiro	(Argentina) Boca Juniors	2016–2023
(Peru) Raúl Ruidíaz	(Mexico) Morelia	2018–2024
(Spain) Víctor Rodríguez	(Spain) Sporting Gijón	2019
(Ecuador) Xavier Arreaga	(Ecuador) Barcelona S.C.	2019
(Brazil) João Paulo	(Brazil) Botafogo	2020–2021
(Slovakia) Albert Rusnák	(United States) Real Salt Lake	2022–2026
(Argentina) **Pedro de la Vega**	(Argentina) Lanús	2024–
(United States) **Jordan Morris**	(United States) Seattle Sounders Academy	2025–
(Serbia) **Dejan Joveljić**	(United States) Sporting Kansas City	2026–

=== Toronto FC ===
Player	Previous club	Years as DP
(Canada) Julian de Guzman	(Spain) Deportivo La Coruña	2009–2012
(Spain) Mista	(Spain) Deportivo La Coruña	2010
(Netherlands) Danny Koevermans	(Netherlands) PSV Eindhoven	2011–2013
(Germany) Torsten Frings	(Germany) Werder Bremen	2011–2012
(France) Eric Hassli	(Canada) Vancouver Whitecaps	2012
(Argentina) Matías Laba	(Argentina) Argentinos Juniors	2013
(Brazil) Gilberto	(Brazil) Internacional	2014
(United States) Michael Bradley	(Italy) Roma	2014–2019
(England) Jermain Defoe	(England) Tottenham Hotspur	2014–2015
(Italy) Sebastian Giovinco	(Italy) Juventus	2015–2018
(United States) Jozy Altidore	(England) Sunderland	2015–2021
(Spain) Alejandro Pozuelo	(Belgium) Genk	2019–2022
(Argentina) Pablo Piatti	(Spain) Espanyol	2020
(Venezuela) Yeferson Soteldo	(Brazil) Santos	2021
(Mexico) Carlos Salcedo	(Mexico) Tigres UANL	2022
(Italy) Lorenzo Insigne	(Italy) Napoli	2022–2025
(Italy) Federico Bernardeschi	(Italy) Juventus	2022–2025
(Canada) Jonathan Osorio	(Canada) SC Toronto	2023–2024
(Canada) Richie Laryea	(England) Nottingham Forest	2024
(United States) **Djordje Mihailovic**	(United States) Colorado Rapids	2025–
(United States) **Josh Sargent**	(England) Norwich City	2026–

=== Vancouver Whitecaps FC ===
Player	Previous club	Years as DP
(France) Eric Hassli	(Switzerland) Zürich	2011–2012
(The Gambia) Mustapha Jarju	(Belgium) Mons	2011
(Scotland) Barry Robson	(England) Middlesbrough	2012
(Scotland) Kenny Miller	(Wales) Cardiff City	2012–2014
(Argentina) Matías Laba	(Canada) Toronto FC	2014–2017
(Argentina) Mauro Rosales	(United States) Chivas USA	2014
(Chile) Pedro Morales	(Spain) Málaga	2014–2016
(Uruguay) Octavio Rivero	(Chile) O'Higgins	2015–2016
(Colombia) Fredy Montero	(China) Tianjin TEDA (Portugal) Sporting CP	2017; 2019
(United States) Brek Shea	(United States) Orlando City	2017–2018
(Costa Rica) Kendall Waston	(Costa Rica) Saprissa	2018
(South Korea) Hwang In-beom	(South Korea) Daejeon Citizen	2019–2020
(Uruguay) Joaquín Ardaiz	(Switzerland) Chiasso	2019
(Iraq) Ali Adnan Kadhim	(Italy) Udinese	2019–2021
(Canada) Lucas Cavallini	(Mexico) Puebla	2020–2022
(Scotland) **Ryan Gauld**	(Portugal) Farense	2021–
(Paraguay) **Andrés Cubas**	(France) Nîmes	2022–
(Venezuela) Sergio Córdova	(Germany) FC Augsburg	2023
(Scotland) Stuart Armstrong	(England) Southampton	2024
(Germany) **Thomas Müller**	(Germany) Bayern Munich	2026–

== Past and present Designated Players by country ==
Number	Country	Players
58	Argentina	Luciano Acosta, Ignacio Aliseda, Thiago Almada, Esequiel Barco, Guillermo Barros Schelotto, Hernán Bernardello, Claudio Bieler, Sebastián Blanco, Gustavo Bou, Milton Caraglio, Julián Carranza, Tomás Chancalay, Enzo Copetti, Pedro de la Vega, Rodrigo De Paul, Mauro Díaz, Sebastián Driussi, Fabián Espíndola, Cristian Espinoza, Brian Fernández, Nicolás Fernández, Alan Franco, Marcelo Gallardo, Federico Higuaín, Gonzalo Higuaín, Sebastián Jaime, Franco Jara, Matías Laba, Claudio López, Hernán López, Cristian Maidana, Juan Manuel Martínez, Pity Martínez, Tomás Martínez, Lucas Melano, Lionel Messi, Javier Morales, Maximiliano Moralez, Marcelino Moreno, Martín Ojeda, Lucas Ontivero, Cristian Pavón, Matías Pellegrini, Joaquín Pereyra, Matías Pérez García, Ignacio Piatti, Pablo Piatti, Tomás Pochettino, Ezequiel Ponce, Juan Edgardo Ramírez, Emanuel Reynoso, Emiliano Rigoni, Lucas Rodríguez, Mauro Rosales, Diego Valeri, Gonzalo Verón, Milton Valenzuela, Alan Velasco
33	United States	Paxten Aaronson, Freddy Adu, Jozy Altidore, Paul Arriola, DaMarcus Beasley, Kyle Beckerman, Alejandro Bedoya, Matt Besler, Michael Bradley, Clint Dempsey, Landon Donovan, Dom Dwyer, Maurice Edu, Justen Glad, Jesús Ferreira, Omar Gonzalez, Tim Howard, Eddie Johnson, Jermaine Jones, Mark McKenzie, Djordje Mihailovic, Jordan Morris, Darlington Nagbe, Claudio Reyna, Miles Robinson, Josh Sargent, Brek Shea, Matt Turner, Brandon Vázquez, Chris Wondolowski, Gyasi Zardes, Walker Zimmerman, Graham Zusi
23	Brazil	Luiz Araújo, Artur, Brenner, Douglas Costa, Rwan Cruz, Denílson, Luciano Emílio, Evander, Geovanni, Gilberto, Rafael Gladiador, Guilherme, Jéferson, Kaká, João Klauss, José Kléberson, André Luiz, Luquinhas, Talles Magno, Thiago Martins, Rafael Navarro, João Paulo, Gabriel Pec
20	Mexico	Germán Berterame, Cuauhtémoc Blanco, Omar Bravo, Nery Castillo, Marco Fabián, Javier Hernández, Héctor Herrera, Luis Ángel Landín, Javier Eduardo López, Hirving Lozano, Rafael Márquez, Rodolfo Pizarro, Alan Pulido, Jorge Ruvalcaba, Carlos Salcedo, Giovani dos Santos, Jonathan dos Santos, Erick Torres, Jairo Torres, Carlos Vela
17	Colombia	Juan Pablo Ángel, Cristian Arango, Eduard Atuesta, Fabián Castillo, Diego Chará, Yimmi Chará, Andrés Ramiro Escobar, David Ferreira, Ménder García, Cucho Hernández, Mauro Manotas, Fredy Montero, Santiago Moreno, Santiago Mosquera, Luis Muriel, Darwin Quintero, Ángelo Rodríguez
16	Uruguay	Joaquín Ardaiz, Felipe Carballo, Thomás Chacón, Bruno Damiani, Álvaro Fernández, Nicolás Lodeiro, Mauricio Pereyra, Federico Puppo, Egidio Arévalo Rios, Octavio Rivero, Brian Rodríguez, Jonathan Rodríguez, Santiago Rodríguez, Diego Rossi, David Texeira, Facundo Torres
13	Paraguay	Miguel Almirón, Luis Amarilla, Cristian Colmán, Josué Colmán, Andrés Cubas, Cecilio Domínguez, Sebastián Ferreira, Gastón Giménez, Kaku, Jesús Medina, Braian Ojeda, Nelson Valdez, Héctor Villalba
12	England	David Beckham, Jermain Defoe, Steven Gerrard, Jack Harrison, Frank Lampard, Liam Ridgewell, Wayne Rooney, Josh Sims, Sam Surridge, Morgan Whittaker, Bradley Wright-Phillips, Dru Yearwood
12	Spain	Jordi Alba, Pep Biel, Sergio Busquets, Manu García, Carles Gil, Iván Jaime, Brais Méndez, Mista, Alejandro Pozuelo, Riqui Puig, Víctor Rodríguez, David Villa
11	France	Romain Alessandrini, Kévin Cabral, Yohan Croizet, Claude Dielna, Olivier Giroud, Antoine Griezmann, Eric Hassli, Thierry Henry, Adrien Hunou, Blaise Matuidi, Allan Saint-Maximin
10	Germany	Torsten Frings, Marcel Hartel, Eduard Löwen, Hany Mukhtar, Thomas Müller, Frank Rost, Bastian Schweinsteiger, Christian Tiffert, Kai Wagner, Timo Werner
8	Ecuador	Jordy Alcívar, Juan Luis Anangonó, Xavier Arreaga, Leonardo Campana, Aníbal Chalá, Carlos Gruezo, Oswaldo Minda, Joao Plata
8	Ivory Coast	Jonathan Bamba, Ousmane Doumbia, Didier Drogba, Xavier Kouassi, Emmanuel Latte Lath, Aké Arnaud Loba, Bénie Traoré, Wilfried Zaha
8	Poland	Mateusz Bogusz, Adam Buksa, Kamil Jóźwiak, Mateusz Klich, Patryk Klimala, Robert Lewandowski, Jarosław Niezgoda, Karol Świderski
7	Honduras	Bryan Acosta, Jerry Bengtson, Alberth Elis, Roger Espinoza, Boniek García, Alexander López, Bryan Róchez
7	Scotland	Stuart Armstrong, Kris Boyd, Ryan Gauld, Shaun Maloney, Kenny Miller, Barry Robson, Johnny Russell
7	Venezuela	Fernando Aristeguieta, Jhonder Cádiz, Sergio Córdova, Josef Martínez, Jeizon Ramírez, Jefferson Savarino, Yeferson Soteldo
6	Denmark	Anders Dreyer, Carlo Holse, Andreas Maxsø, Younes Namli, Mikael Uhre, Philip Zinckernagel
6	Italy	Federico Bernardeschi, Marco Di Vaio, Sebastian Giovinco, Lorenzo Insigne, Andrea Pirlo, Kelvin Yeboah
6	Portugal	David da Costa, Diogo Gonçalves, José Gonçalves, André Horta, Nani, Pedro Santos
6	Switzerland	Roman Bürki, Blerim Džemaili, Breel Embolo, Innocent Emeghara, Blaise Nkufo, Xherdan Shaqiri
5	Canada	Lucas Cavallini, Julian de Guzman, Dwayne De Rosario, Richie Laryea, Jonathan Osorio
5	Chile	Pablo Aránguiz, Felipe Gutiérrez, Pedro Morales, Diego Rubio, Alexis Sánchez
5	Costa Rica	Allan Cruz, Luis Díaz, Randall Leal, Álvaro Saborío, Kendall Waston
4	Albania	Shkëlzen Gashi, Hamdi Salihi, Myrto Uzuni, Giacomo Vrioni
4	Belgium	Christian Benteke, Hugo Cuypers, Jelle Van Damme, Dante Vanzeir
4	Ghana	David Accam, Osman Bukari, Jonathan Mensah, Joseph Paintsil
4	Israel	Liel Abada, Tai Baribo, Omer Damari, Gadi Kinda
4	Nigeria	Fanendo Adi, Kennedy Igboananike, Obafemi Martins, Obinna Nwobodo
4	Peru	Edison Flores, Andrés Mendoza, Raúl Ruidíaz, Yoshimar Yotún
4	Sweden	Magnus Eriksson, Emil Forsberg, Zlatan Ibrahimović, Freddie Ljungberg
3	Croatia	Damir Kreilach, Petar Musa, Marco Pašalić
3	Finland	Matti Peltola, Teemu Pukki, Alexander Ring
3	Hungary	Dániel Gazdag, Nemanja Nikolić, Dániel Sallói
3	Serbia	Dejan Joveljić, Aleksandar Katai, Nemanja Radoja
2	Armenia	Yura Movsisyan, Lucas Zelarayán
2	(Czech Republic) Czechia	Bořek Dočkal, Ondřej Lingr
2	Gabon	Denis Bouanga, Aaron Boupendza
2	(Georgia (country)) Georgia	Saba Lobzhanidze, Valeri Qazaishvili
2	Greece	Taxiarchis Fountas, Giorgos Giakoumakis
2	(Republic of Ireland) Ireland	Kevin Doyle, Robbie Keane
2	Jamaica	Giles Barnes, Simon Dawkins
2	Netherlands	Danny Koevermans, Sherjill MacDonald
2	Norway	Stian Rode Gregersen, Kristoffer Velde
2	Romania	Alexandru Mitriță, Louis Munteanu
2	Slovakia	Ján Greguš, Albert Rusnák
2	Slovenia	Robert Berić, Aljaž Struna
2	South Korea	Hwang In-beom, Son Heung-min
1	Algeria	Saphir Taïder
1	Australia	Tim Cahill
1	Austria	Ercan Kara
1	Cameroon	Eric Maxim Choupo-Moting
1	Cape Verde	Jamiro Monteiro
1	Cuba	Osvaldo Alonso
1	Curaçao	Jürgen Locadia
1	(The Gambia) Gambia	Mustapha Jarju
1	Grenada	Shalrie Joseph
1	Guinea	Morgan Guilavogui
1	Guinea-Bissau	Gerso Fernandes
1	Iceland	Victor Pálsson
1	Iraq	Ali Adnan Kadhim
1	Japan	Yuya Kubo
1	Kenya	Victor Wanyama
1	Liberia	Sam Johnson
1	Montenegro	Branko Bošković
1	Palestine	Wessam Abou Ali
1	Panama	Gabriel Torres
1	Russia	Aleksei Miranchuk
1	Sierra Leone	Kei Kamara
1	Togo	Kévin Denkey
1	Tunisia	Elias Achouri
1	Turkey	Cengiz Ünder
1	Zimbabwe	Teenage Hadebe

== See also ==
- Allocation money
- Franchise player
- Rodman rule
