= Rodman rule =

Rule in American women's soccer

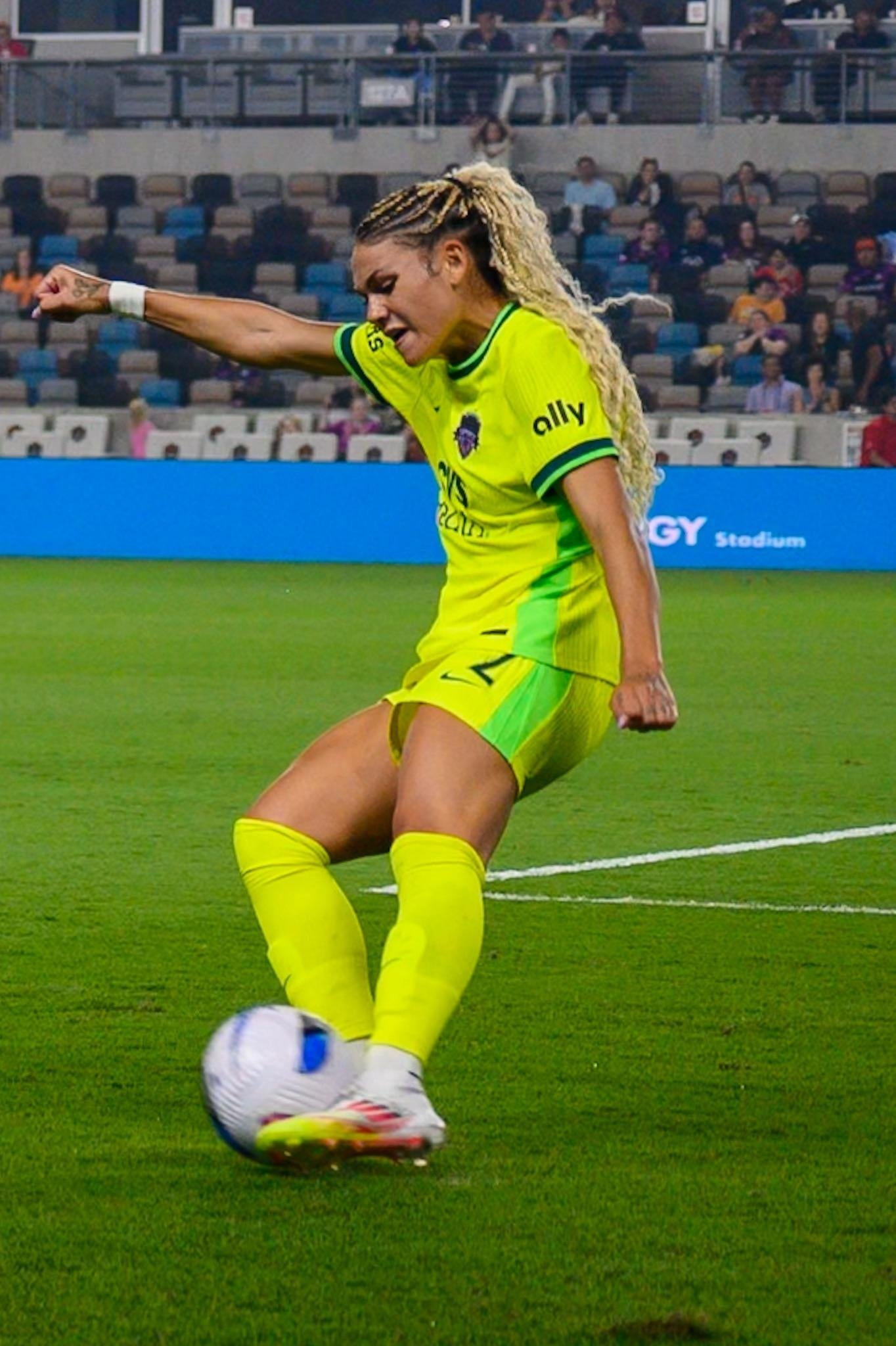
Trinity Rodman playing for the Washington Spirit in 2025; the rule was introduced that year largely to allow Rodman to renew with the club

The Rodman rule, officially the High Impact Player Rule, is a caveat to the National Women's Soccer League (NWSL)'s salary cap rules, allowing member clubs to exceed the salary cap for players whom they designate High Impact Players (HIPs).

When the rule was introduced by the NWSL in December 2025, it only allowed the salary exemptions to apply to players who met any of several criteria based on their individual marketability. The rule was widely understood to be in order to avoid Trinity Rodman leaving for a league without salary cap in the January 2026 window, with its implementation heavily criticized. Following a grievance raised by the National Women's Soccer League Players Association (NWSLPA), the NWSL settled in October 2026 to remove the original criteria.

Teams in the NWSL can go above the salary cap to pay a HIP as long as that player's salary cap charge exceeds 12% of the base salary cap.

== History and implementation ==
=== Background: salary cap ===
The National Women's Soccer League (NWSL) uses a salary cap model that limits a whole club's roster to an overall limit. The NWSL clubs and players' union NWSLPA have lobbied for a higher salary cap, to allow for different options in roster building and better salaries for squad players. Many other women's national soccer leagues, including the Big Five, do not have salary caps; the NWSL also feared that the ability for such European clubs to spend big on star players would reduce quality in the NWSL. In 2025, the NWSL salary cap was increased by $200,000 as part of its season-on-season increase, taking the per-club cap to $3.5 million. The highest-earning players in Europe reportedly earn over $1 million individually a season. NWSL commissioner Jessica Berman indicated the annual increases may not continue after 2026, stating that "in order to treat [the NWSL] like a business, it means that the amount that our teams are investing has to have a rational relationship to revenue."

=== Rodman contract renewal ===
Trinity Rodman became the then-highest-paid NWSL player in 2022, with a contract over four seasons worth $1.1 million. This contract was to expire on December 31, 2025, making Rodman a free agent with interest from European clubs (and able to negotiate contracts from six months prior). With questions of their salary cap impeding Rodman staying in the NWSL, Berman said the league would fight to retain her.

At the start of December 2025, Rodman agreed a new contract with her club, the Washington Spirit, averaging at $1.1 million per season, but back-loaded to allow for higher annual pay in years with higher salary caps. The NWSL (with which contracts are ultimately agreed) rejected the contract due to violating the spirit of the league's salary cap rules, without outright breaking them. It was later reported that the NWSL did not consider it possible under the salary cap for Rodman's contractual salary to be met and for the Spirit to meet its contractual obligation of 20 full-time players even on minimum wage. The NWSLPA filed a grievance on behalf of Rodman, which caused the NWSL board to convene with an aim to changing rules to allow more freedom in the contracts it would permit.

Media in the United States and Europe reported at the time that, after losing players like Alyssa Thompson and Naomi Girma to the Women's Super League (WSL), Rodman was the litmus test to determine if the NWSL would be structurally able to retain any of its top players, that the threat of Rodman leaving was "symbolically enormous" and the grievance outcome would reshape how salaries are handled in the NWSL. When Rodman's deal went through in January, Berman stated it was proof the rule was working as intended.

=== High Impact Player Rule ===
On December 23, 2025, the NWSL introduced what they called the High Impact Player Rule, a rule creating a caveat to the salary cap. It allows, from 2026, NWSL clubs to spend an allowance of $1 million+ above their salary cap on the wages of High Impact Players (HIP). Clubs may use the money above the cap to subsidise the salaries of one or multiple HIPs. Any contract using the rule must set the cap charge for HIPs at a minimum of 12% of the base salary cap. The rule came into place on July 1, 2026, but contracts which use it could be signed and begin before then, as long as no salary money above the cap was paid until after. The phasing-out of allocation money also means the HIP money replaces that, broader, method of supplementing salaries. Stephanie Lee, the NWSL's vice-president of player affairs, later suggested that something like the HIP rule had been under consideration since 2023 when the league began the process to start phasing out allocation money and other structural planning to financially match foreign leagues.

In the first year of the rule (2026 NWSL season), HIPs had to meet at least one of eight (it is only possible to meet up to seven) criteria that the NWSL had chosen to designate the most marketable women's footballers in the world. Rodman met all seven criteria for which she is eligible; a source close to the league said the rule is "bigger than one player". Berman said the NWSL believed it was important for them to have aligned criteria for the Rodman rule so they could act responsibly in making sure extra salary spending was done so in relationship to growing league revenue. From January 1, 2027, for the 2027 NWSL season, clubs will be able to designate their HIPs and spend up to $1.257 million above the salary cap on their wages.

The allowance is expected to increase season-on-season in line with salary cap increases, and has been compared to Major League Soccer (MLS)'s Designated Player Rule (the Beckham rule), which was introduced in order to bring high-salary players, specifically David Beckham, into the MLS from abroad. Though using the same mechanism to enhance salary, the Rodman rule is instead designed to help the NWSL retain top American talent and initially used different mechanisms in player designation.

=== NWSLPA grievance ===
The NWSLPA objected to the rule as, under US federal labor law, changes in salary cap (which is outlined in the NWSL's collective bargaining agreement [CBA]) must be decided by agreement rather than unilateral action: Meghann Burke, as executive director of the NWSLPA, said that "Fair pay is realized through fair, collectively bargained compensation systems, not arbitrary classifications." They also had concerns regarding the speed with which the rule was introduced, and indicated they may take legal action to challenge it: the NWSLPA filed its own grievance against the rule in January 2026, requesting for nullification until proper bargaining, and for compensation for player contracts affected by its implementation.

Berman responded that the NWSL had negotiated into the existing CBA the ability to unilaterally move forward with implementing a rule for reduced salary cap charge on certain players, which they feel the Rodman rule satisfies; Burke argued the parameters were different, the salary cap charge is not reduced, and the NWSLPA was only notified of the proposal less than two weeks before it was publicly announced so the NWSL did not consult them in good faith. The NWSLPA position at and since the time of the rule's announcement remained to simply increase the salary cap by $1 million instead if that money exists.

The Cutback reported in May 2026 that the NWSL was considering amending the rule in response to criticism, to remove criteria and allow clubs to designate their High Impact Players. On October 23, 2026, the NWSL and NWSLPA settled several grievances relating to labor law and individual opportunities, including the Rodman rule. The NWSLPA argued that besides violating the CBA, classifying players also violated federal labor law. The NWSL agreed to drop the original criteria for designation of HIPs, bringing the Rodman rule closer in line to the Beckham rule; retained the rule that an individual HIP's salary must exceed 12% of the base salary cap; and reserved the right to limit the number of HIPs in any individual team's roster.

== Lists of High Impact Players ==
=== Players designated High Impact Players ===
The Guardian noted that teams are not obliged to disclose which players they have signed under the Rodman rule. ESPN confirmed in October 2026 that fewer than half of NWSL teams were using the rule. The following have been publicly reported as players signed to contracts with the intention of using the rule:

Player	National team	NWSL team	Contract type	Contract date	Ref(s)
Trinity Rodman	United States	Washington Spirit	Renewal	January 22, 2026	
Catarina Macario	United States	San Diego Wave FC	International transfer	March 2026	
Lindsey Heaps	United States	Denver Summit FC	International transfer	January 12, 2026	

=== Players eligible under initial criteria ===
The NWSL described the original HIP eligibility criteria as being a mix of "commercial and sporting" and suggested that the criteria would be up for continual reconsideration. The original eight criteria were devised through a process involving the league's board. Among the board members was Kay Cossington, who stated the aim of the criteria as finding metrics to include as many players understood to be "world superstars and global icons and role models" as possible.

Original criteria:

1. Listed on SportsPro Media Top 150 Most Marketable Athletes, within the one year prior to the current league season
2. Nominated for the Ballon d'Or Féminin (i.e. included in the top 30), in the two years prior to the current league season
3. Included in the top 40 on The 100 Best Female Footballers in the World list (published by The Guardian), in the two years prior
4. Included in the top 40 of the ESPN50 (ESPN FC's top 50 football players in the world list), in the two years prior
5. For outfield players: Have among the top 11 most minutes played among outfielders for the United States women's national soccer team (USWNT) in all competitions, in the prior two calendar years
6. For goalkeepers: Have the most minutes played among goalkeepers for the USWNT in all competitions, in the prior two calendar years
7. Be an NWSL Most Valuable Player finalist, within the previous two league seasons
8. Be included in the NWSL Best XI, within the previous two league seasons

At the time of the rule's introduction, CBS Sports broke down the eligibility lists into groups of players meeting five to seven of the criteria, those meeting three or four of the criteria, and those meeting one or two criteria. It noted that looking at the top group made it apparent the rule seems designed to accommodate Rodman, and that the middle group was more diverse in its mix of NWSL stand-outs and international stars. With only one USWNT goalkeeper automatically eligible, CBS described it as "a quirk" that this fell to Alyssa Naeher, whose minutes were accumulated before she retired internationally.

The league confirmed that even if players signed to contracts which use the HIP rule would have later become ineligible, the contract would have remained able to use the HIP allowance for its duration.

As of 24 December 2025, for the 2026 NWSL season

Player	National team	League	Eligible through criteria:							
Player	National team	League	Performance & marketability				USWNT minutes		NWSL awards	
Player	National team	League	1	2	3	4	5	6	7	8
Trinity Rodman	United States	NWSL	Yes	Yes	Yes	Yes	Yes	No	Yes	Yes
Sophia Wilson	United States	NWSL	Yes	Yes	Yes	Yes	Yes	No	Yes	Yes
Marta	Brazil	NWSL	Yes	Yes	Yes	Yes	No	No	Yes	Yes
Lindsey Heaps	United States	Première Ligue	Yes	Yes	Yes	Yes	Yes	No	No	No
Temwa Chawinga	Malawi	NWSL	No	Yes	Yes	Yes	No	No	Yes	Yes
Barbra Banda	Zambia	NWSL	No	Yes	Yes	Yes	No	No	Yes	Yes
Esther González	Spain	NWSL	No	Yes	Yes	Yes	No	No	Yes	Yes
Alexia Putellas	Spain	Liga F	Yes	Yes	Yes	Yes	No	No	No	No
Aitana Bonmatí	Spain	Liga F	Yes	Yes	Yes	Yes	No	No	No	No
Lucy Bronze	England	WSL	Yes	Yes	Yes	Yes	No	No	No	No
Lauren James	England	WSL	Yes	Yes	Yes	Yes	No	No	No	No
Patricia Guijarro	Spain	Liga F	Yes	Yes	Yes	Yes	No	No	No	No
Salma Paralluelo	Spain	Liga F	Yes	Yes	Yes	Yes	No	No	No	No
Emily Fox	United States	WSL	No	Yes	Yes	Yes	Yes	No	No	No
Alyssa Naeher	United States	NWSL	No	Yes	Yes	Yes	No	Yes	No	No
Pernille Harder	Denmark	FBL	Yes	Yes	Yes	No	No	No	No	No
Keira Walsh	England	WSL	Yes	No	Yes	Yes	No	No	No	No
Caroline Weir	Scotland	Liga F	No	Yes	Yes	Yes	No	No	No	No
Klara Bühl	Germany	FBL	No	Yes	Yes	Yes	No	No	No	No
Melchie Dumornay	Haiti	Première Ligue	No	Yes	Yes	Yes	No	No	No	No
Cristiana Girelli	Italy	Serie A	No	Yes	Yes	Yes	No	No	No	No
Sandy Baltimore	France	WSL	No	Yes	Yes	Yes	No	No	No	No
Caroline Graham Hansen	Norway	Liga F	No	Yes	Yes	Yes	No	No	No	No
Clàudia Pina	Spain	Liga F	No	Yes	Yes	Yes	No	No	No	No
Hannah Hampton	England	WSL	No	Yes	Yes	Yes	No	No	No	No
Ewa Pajor	Poland	Liga F	No	Yes	Yes	Yes	No	No	No	No
Leah Williamson	England	WSL	No	Yes	Yes	Yes	No	No	No	No
Chloe Kelly	England	WSL	No	Yes	Yes	Yes	No	No	No	No
Alessia Russo	England	WSL	No	Yes	Yes	Yes	No	No	No	No
Mariona Caldentey	Spain	WSL	No	Yes	Yes	Yes	No	No	No	No
Tabitha Chawinga	Malawi	Première Ligue	No	Yes	Yes	Yes	No	No	No	No
Yui Hasegawa	Japan	WSL	No	Yes	Yes	Yes	No	No	No	No
Lauren Hemp	England	WSL	No	Yes	Yes	Yes	No	No	No	No
Marie-Antoinette Katoto	France	Première Ligue	No	Yes	Yes	Yes	No	No	No	No
Mayra Ramírez	Colombia	WSL	No	Yes	Yes	Yes	No	No	No	No
Khadija Shaw	Jamaica	WSL	No	Yes	Yes	Yes	No	No	No	No
Mallory Swanson	United States	NWSL	No	Yes	Yes	Yes	No	No	No	No
Naomi Girma	United States	WSL	No	No	Yes	Yes	Yes	No	No	No
Delphine Cascarino	France	NWSL	No	No	Yes	Yes	No	No	Yes	No
Ann-Katrin Berger	Germany	NWSL	No	No	Yes	Yes	No	No	No	Yes
Sam Coffey	United States	NWSL	No	No	No	Yes	Yes	No	No	Yes
Mapi León	Spain	Liga F	Yes	No	Yes	No	No	No	No	No
Sofia Cantore	Italy	NWSL	No	Yes	No	Yes	No	No	No	No
Johanna Rytting Kaneryd	Sweden	WSL	No	Yes	Yes	No	No	No	No	No
Giulia Gwinn	Germany	FBL	No	Yes	Yes	No	No	No	No	No
Ada Hegerberg	Norway	Première Ligue	No	Yes	Yes	No	No	No	No	No
Sjoeke Nüsken	Germany	WSL	No	Yes	Yes	No	No	No	No	No
Lea Schüller	Germany	FBL	No	Yes	Yes	No	No	No	No	No
Grace Geyoro	France	WSL	No	Yes	Yes	No	No	No	No	No
Ona Batlle	Spain	Liga F	No	No	Yes	Yes	No	No	No	No
Linda Caicedo	Colombia	Liga F	No	No	Yes	Yes	No	No	No	No
Stina Blackstenius	Sweden	WSL	No	No	Yes	Yes	No	No	No	No
Jule Brand	Germany	Première Ligue	No	No	Yes	Yes	No	No	No	No
Kadidiatou Diani	France	Première Ligue	No	No	Yes	Yes	No	No	No	No
Guro Reiten	Norway	WSL	No	No	Yes	Yes	No	No	No	No
Fridolina Rolfö	Sweden	WSL	No	No	Yes	Yes	No	No	No	No
Rose Lavelle	United States	NWSL	No	No	No	Yes	Yes	No	No	No
Manaka Matsukubo	Japan	NWSL	No	No	No	No	No	No	Yes	Yes
Beth Mead	England	WSL	Yes	No	No	No	No	No	No	No
Mary Earps	England	Première Ligue	Yes	No	No	No	No	No	No	No
Millie Bright	England	WSL	Yes	No	No	No	No	No	No	No
Steph Catley	Australia	WSL	No	Yes	No	No	No	No	No	No
Clara Mateo	France	Première Ligue	No	Yes	No	No	No	No	No	No
Frida Maanum	Norway	WSL	No	Yes	No	No	No	No	No	No
Amanda Gutierres	Brazil	Brasileirão	No	Yes	No	No	No	No	No	No
Manuela Giugliano	Italy	Serie A	No	Yes	No	No	No	No	No	No
Gabi Portilho	Brazil	NWSL	No	Yes	No	No	No	No	No	No
Tarciane	Brazil	Première Ligue	No	Yes	No	No	No	No	No	No
Glódís Perla Viggósdóttir	Iceland	FBL	No	Yes	No	No	No	No	No	No
Cata Coll	Spain	Liga F	No	No	Yes	No	No	No	No	No
Alexandra Popp	Germany	FBL	No	No	Yes	No	No	No	No	No
Georgia Stanway	England	FBL	No	No	Yes	No	No	No	No	No
Irene Paredes	Spain	WSL	No	No	No	Yes	No	No	No	No
Katie McCabe	Republic of Ireland	WSL	No	No	No	Yes	No	No	No	No
Erin Cuthbert	Scotland	WSL	No	No	No	Yes	No	No	No	No
Olga Carmona	Spain	Première Ligue	No	No	No	Yes	No	No	No	No
Alex Greenwood	England	WSL	No	No	No	Yes	No	No	No	No
Selma Bacha	France	Première Ligue	No	No	No	Yes	No	No	No	No
Vicky López	Spain	Liga F	No	No	No	Yes	No	No	No	No
Aggie Beever-Jones	England	WSL	No	No	No	Yes	No	No	No	No
Michelle Agyemang	England	WSL	No	No	No	Yes	No	No	No	No
Korbin Shrader	United States	Première Ligue	No	No	No	No	Yes	No	No	No
Tierna Davidson	United States	NWSL	No	No	No	No	Yes	No	No	No
Crystal Dunn	United States	Première Ligue	No	No	No	No	Yes	No	No	No
Emily Sonnett	United States	NWSL	No	No	No	No	Yes	No	No	No
Bia Zaneratto	Brazil	NWSL	No	No	No	No	No	No	Yes	No
Emily Sams	United States	NWSL	No	No	No	No	No	No	No	Yes
Casey Krueger	United States	NWSL	No	No	No	No	No	No	No	Yes
Kaleigh Kurtz	United States	NWSL	No	No	No	No	No	No	No	Yes
Jenna Nighswonger	United States	WSL	No	No	No	No	No	No	No	Yes
Croix Bethune	United States	NWSL	No	No	No	No	No	No	No	Yes
Lorena	Brazil	NWSL	No	No	No	No	No	No	No	Yes
Tara McKeown	United States	NWSL	No	No	No	No	No	No	No	Yes
Avery Patterson	United States	NWSL	No	No	No	No	No	No	No	Yes
Izzy Rodriguez	United States	NWSL	No	No	No	No	No	No	No	Yes
Kayla Sharples	United States	NWSL	No	No	No	No	No	No	No	Yes
Claire Hutton	United States	NWSL	No	No	No	No	No	No	No	Yes
Olivia Moultrie	United States	NWSL	No	No	No	No	No	No	No	Yes

== Criticism ==
The rule was criticized for focusing on marketability, and potentially media popularity, rather than other factors; for ignoring the NWSLPA's requests for a broader salary cap increase to improve conditions; for the Euro-centrism of many criteria; and for the criteria excluding many players who had already proven themselves as high-impact signings in the NWSL.

Sports Illustrated opined that the rule was not sufficient cover to protect the NWSL from potential player departures, with the attraction of high-profile European football and international salaries that the NWSL salary cap is not prepared to match. CBS Sports felt that, though the first four criteria were relatively arbitrary, they "may have actually saved the NWSL's skin" as they are the only path to inclusion for some well-established international stars. Nevertheless, it thought that the lack of a criterion that could account for injury – the reason for players like Sam Kerr and Catarina Macario not being eligible – was an oversight. It also found it surprising that Lizbeth Ovalle, the most expensive women's transfer at the time, did not meet any criteria. Macario was ultimately brought into the NWSL with a salary to be financed by the HIP allowance, due to an interpretation of criterion #5 that would include her as having played among the top 11 most minutes for the USWNT in 2025 only. (Note: In sources which published the criteria and lists of players based on the criteria, #5 (like #6) was interpreted as the most minutes across the two years prior combined. The list on this article follows this interpretation.)

Other cause for concern was the fear that contracts for league players who have been at NWSL teams for many years, which would usually include salary increases with each new contract, could instead be reduced as salary space within the cap is built for HIPs clubs become able to sign. Yael Averbuch West, director of Gotham FC, suggested that certain approaches to roster-building would in fact allow more salary space for such players. Interviewed by Front Office Sports in May 2026, Gotham player Midge Purce said that she "hate[s] so much" the rule, due to believing Rodman and others are worth even more than the rule allows, that the rule's mechanisms are too restrictive and the salary cap should have been increased instead; and because of concerns that media companies named in the criteria (which Purce – referring to ESPN – also opined did not cover the NWSL well) have been handed control over deciding which players can be paid more. Former Spirit and Gotham player Kelley O'Hara also said she disagrees with the rule.

The Guardian raised additional concerns about the rule implicitly encouraging American star players to stay in the NWSL if they are eligible for HIP contracts, which may stifle their opportunities to experience international football at club level and develop around different teams, though acknowledged the popularity of the NWSL was historically tied to high-profile USWNT players. Following the rule changes in October 2026, The Guardian opined that "the spirit of NWSL's original criteria has more merit than many suggest", pointing to balancing budget and league marketing, but commended that removing criteria "is a win for players" and that introducing a limit on how many players in one team can be HIPs would be beneficial to weaker teams.

USWNT coach at the time of the rule's introduction, Emma Hayes, felt it was wrong to put her or any coach in a position where their squad decisions can directly affect a player's club salary, and highlighted the fight of women's players "for our ability to not just choose, but to earn fair market value" wherever they may want to play.

In ESPN's 2026 survey of NWSL team managers, the managers were asked about the rule, responding based on the original criteria. Asked if they thought it would work, 81% responded yes, but in feedback the consensus highlighted that for the rule to work it would need additional financial infrastructure; there were mixed responses when asked whether the rule had changed locker room dynamics; managers felt that, even with the rule, the league's transfer fee cap would price teams out internationally; and the majority of managers wanted fewer salary rules when asked the one thing they would change about the league.

== See also ==
- Professionalism in women's association football
