= Matías Vera =

Argentine footballer

Personal information
- Full name: Matías Gabriel Vera
- Date of birth: 20 November 1995 (age 30)
- Place of birth: Merlo, Argentina
- Height: 1.72 m (5 ft 7 1/2 in)
- Position: Defensive midfielder

Team information
- Current team: Central Córdoba
- Number: 22

Youth career
- Nueva Chicago

Senior career*
Years	Team	Apps	(Gls)
2015–2018	Nueva Chicago	82	(2)
2018–2019	San Lorenzo	0	(0)
2018	→ O'Higgins (loan)	28	(2)
2019–2023	Houston Dynamo	108	(3)
2023	→ Argentinos Juniors (loan)	14	(0)
2024–2025	Olimpia	16	(0)
2025–	Central Córdoba	47	(0)
- * Club domestic league appearances and goals as of 17:23, 12 November 2026 (UTC)

Matías Gabriel Vera (born 20 November 1995) is an Argentine professional footballer who plays as a defensive midfielder for Central Córdoba.

== Career ==
=== Nueva Chicago ===
Vera started his career with Nueva Chicago and came through their youth ranks, serving as a captain for his teams. He originally played as a right winger and right back before his coaches moved him to defensive midfield due to his ball winning ability and natural instincts. Vera was promoted to the first team during the 2015 Argentine Primera División season. He made his debut on 6 April in a 2–1 defeat to Banfield and went on to make 17 appearances across all competitions in his first season. Nueva Chicago were relegated to Primera B Nacional in 2015, where they remained for the next three seasons as Vera featured sixty-eight times for them in all competitions while also scoring twice, netting in games with All Boys and Atlético Paraná.

=== O'Higgins ===
In January 2018, Vera joined Argentine Primera División side San Lorenzo. However, he was immediately loaned to O'Higgins of the Chilean Primera División.

His first appearance for O'Higgins was against Huachipato on 18 February 2018 in matchweek 1 of the Primera División season. He would start the first 8 games of the season before he missed matchweek 9 after getting two yellow cards in the previous match. He returned to the starting lineup for matchweek 10 Vera scored his first goal for O'Higgins on 25 August in a 1–1 draw with his first Unión Española. Vera was suspended for their matchweek 29 game due to yellow card accumulation. He returned to the lineup in matchweek 30, the final week of the season, and scored in a 4–0 win over Audax Italiano. Vera started 30 out of a possible 32 games for O'Higgins, only missing out on 2 due to suspension. O'Higgins finished the season eighth in the table, missing out on qualification to 2019 Copa Sudamericana first stage to Unión Española on goal difference.

=== Houston Dynamo ===
On 21 December 2018, Vera signed with the Houston Dynamo of Major League Soccer. The reported transfer fee was around $1 million. Vera made his Dynamo debut on 19 February, playing all 90 minutes in a 1–0 win over CD Guastatoya in the CONCACAF Champions League. He played every minute of the tournament as Houston reached the quarter-finals, where they were eliminated by Tigres UANL. Vera made his MLS debut on 2 March in a 1–1 draw with Real Salt Lake, but he was sent off after picking up two yellow cards. He scored for the Dynamo for the first time on 11 June, netting in a 3–2 win over Austin Bold in the U.S. Open Cup. Although Houston missed out on the playoffs, Vera enjoyed a strong debut season, leading the team in minutes played with 2,639 in the league and 3,088 in all competitions. He was voted as the team MVP and Newcomer of the Year by local journalists and the Dynamo staff.

Vera and the Dynamo opened the season on February 29 with a 1–1 draw against the LA Galaxy. After the second game of the year, the season was paused due to the COVID-19 pandemic, with play resuming in July. Vera played in 20 of a possible 23 games in a shortened season, anchoring the Dynamo midfield. He served as team captain for 11 of the games during the season, as the primary captain, Boniek Garcia, missed time with an injury and also featured primarily as a substitute. It was another poor season for the Dynamo as a team, finishing bottom of the Western Conference and failing to qualify for the playoffs again.

On 16 April 2021, Vera made his first appearance of the season, playing the full 90 minutes in a 2–1 win over the San Jose Earthquakes in matchweek 1. He scored his first goal of the season, and first career MLS goal, on 29 May in a 3–2 loss to Sporting Kansas City. On 21 August, Vera scored the equalizer to give the Dynamo a 2–2 draw against Texas Derby rivals FC Dallas. He ended the season with 3 goals and 1 assist in 30 appearances, as the Dynamo finished last in the Western Conference again. On 29 November 2021, Vera signed a new contract keeping him in Houston through the 2023 season, with a team option for 2024.

Vera featured frequently again in 2022, making 28 appearances (all starts) and recording 2 assists in the 2022 regular season However the Dynamo missed out on the playoffs again after finishing 13th in the conference.

==== Loan to Argentinos Juniors ====
On 9 January 2023, Vera returned to Argentina, joining Primera División side Argentinos Juniors on loan for the 2023 season.

== Career statistics ==
As of 19 February 2023

Club statistics
Club	Season	League			Cup (Note: Includes the Copa Argentina, Copa Chile and US Open Cup)		Continental		Other		Total	
Club	Season	Division	Apps	Goals	Apps	Goals	Apps	Goals	Apps	Goals	Apps	Goals
Nueva Chicago	2015	Argentine Primera División	16	0	1	0	—		—		17	0
Nueva Chicago	2016	Primera B Nacional	18	1	0	0	—		—		18	1
Nueva Chicago	2016–17	Primera B Nacional	38	1	2	0	—		—		40	1
Nueva Chicago	2017–18	Primera B Nacional	10	0	0	0	—		—		10	0
Nueva Chicago	Total		82	2	3	0	—		0	0	85	2
San Lorenzo	2017–18	Argentine Primera División	0	0	0	0	0	0	—		0	0
O'Higgins (loan)	2018	Chilean Primera División	28	2	2	0	—		—		30	2
Houston Dynamo	2019	Major League Soccer	30	0	2	1	4 (Note: Appearances in the CONCACAF Champions League)	0	—		36	1
Houston Dynamo	2020	Major League Soccer	20	0	—		—		—		20	0
Houston Dynamo	2021	Major League Soccer	30	3	—		—		—		30	3
Houston Dynamo	2022	Major League Soccer	28	0	1	0	—		—		29	0
Houston Dynamo	Total		108	3	3	1	4	0	0	0	115	4
Argentinos Juniors	2023	Argentine Primera División	0	0	0	0	0	0	—		0	0
Career total			218	7	8	1	4	0	0	0	227	8

== Honors ==
Houston Dynamo

- Dynamo Team MVP: 2019
- Dynamo Newcomer of the Year: 2019
