= Aljaž Struna =

Slovenian footballer (born 1990)

Personal information
- Date of birth: 4 August 1990 (age 36)
- Place of birth: Piran, SFR Yugoslavia
- Height: 1.89 m (6 ft 2 in)
- Position: Defender

Youth career
- –2009: Koper

Senior career*
| Years | Team | Apps | (Gls) |
| 2009–2012 | Koper | 63 | (3) |
| 2010 | → Jadran Dekani (loan) | | |
| 2012–2018 | Palermo | 63 | (2) |
| 2012–2013 | → Varese (loan) | 9 | (0) |
| 2014–2015 | → Carpi (loan) | 34 | (1) |
| 2016–2017 | → Carpi (loan) | 30 | (1) |
| 2019–2021 | Houston Dynamo | 46 | (0) |
| 2021 | CF Montréal | 18 | (1) |
| 2022–2023 | Perugia | 14 | (0) |
| 2023–2025 | Triestina | 35 | (2) |

International career
| 2008 | Slovenia U18 | 3 | (0) |
| 2008–2009 | Slovenia U19 | 5 | (0) |
| 2009 | Slovenia U20 | 1 | (0) |
| 2009–2012 | Slovenia U21 | 12 | (0) |
| 2016–2019 | Slovenia | 21 | (1) |
- * Club domestic league appearances and goals as of 31 January 2025

Aljaž Struna (born 4 August 1990) is a Slovenian professional footballer who plays as a defender. He made 21 appearances for the Slovenia national team between 2016 and 2019.

== Club career ==
=== Koper ===
Struna began his career in the youth ranks of Slovenian PrvaLiga side Koper. He made his first team debut on 11 April 2009, coming on as a substitute in a 0–0 draw with Maribor. Although Struna played primarily with the youth teams, he made two first team appearances in the 2008–09 season.

Struna found more playing time at the beginning of the 2009–10 season, appearing in fifteen league games and twice in the Slovenian Cup. He scored his first goal for Koper on 12 December 2009 in a 4–0 win over Celje. Struna would go on loan to Slovenian Third League club Jadran Dekani for the second half of the season. Koper would go on to win the PrvaLiga.

Struna returned to Koper after his brief loan. He made his first appearance of the season on 13 July 2010, making his European debut by coming on as a substitute in a UEFA Champions League qualifying match against Dinamo Zagreb. Struna established himself as a starter as the season progressed. On 2 April 2011, Struna scored his first goal of the season to help Koper defeat Maribor 3–0. He would find the net again on 6 April 2011 as Koper beat Celje.

Struna made his first appearance of the 2011–12 season in a UEFA Europa League qualifying match on 30 June 2011, a 1–1 draw with Shakhter Karagandy. Koper would go on to lose 3–2 on aggregate. He scored his only goal of the season on 14 September 2011 in a 2–0 win over Olimpija Ljubljana in a Slovenian Cup match. Struna and Koper would finish fourth in the league, just missing out the UEFA Europa League spot by one point.

=== Palermo ===
On 21 May 2012, Struna was sold to Italian side Palermo for €300,000. In the summer he went on loan to Varese of Serie B, with an option for his new club to acquire 50% of his transfer rights by the end of the season. He missed the start of the season due to a fracture in his foot. Struna made his debut for Varese on 6 October 2012, coming on as a substitute in a 2–2 draw with Empoli. He would however suffer another injury, forcing him to miss multiple months. Struna returned to action in February 2013 and would go onto make nine appearances in his debut season in Italy.

Struna returned to Palermo for the 2013–14 season. He made his debut for the club on 31 August 2013, coming on as a substitute in a 2–1 defeat to Empoli. On 31 October 2013, Struna suffered a left knee injury during training. He underwent surgery on 5 November 2013. Struna was forced to miss the rest of the season due to his injury.

On 29 August 2014 Struna went on loan to Serie B side Carpi for the 2014–15 season. He made his Carpi debut on 30 August 2014 in 1–1 draw with Livorno. Struna scored his first foal for Carpi on 24 December 2014 in a 4–0 win over Perugia. He made 34 appearances as he helped Carpi have the strongest defense in the league, allowing a league low 28 goals in 42 games. In part due to their stingy defense, Carpi finished first in the league and won promotion to Serie A for the first time in club history.

After signing a new contract with Palermo while on loan with Carpi, Struna returned to Palermo for the 2015–16 season. He made his Serie A debut on 30 August 2015 in a 1–0 win over Udinese. However, he was suspended for the next match after picking up two yellow cards. Struna scored his first Serie A goal and his first for Palermo on 20 April 2016, finding the back of the net in the 76th minute to give Palermo a 2–2 draw with Atalanta. He helped Palermo avoid relegation, finishing 16th and one point above the relegation zone.

On 31 August 2016, Struna went back to Carpi on loan for the 2016–17 season with an obligation to buy if Carpi were to be promoted. On 20 September 2016 he scored to help Carpi secure a 2–2 draw with Brescia. Struna made 30 appearances as he helped the Carpi have the fourth lowest goals against in the league. Carpi finished in seventh place and qualified for the promotion playoffs. Struna helped Carpi defeat Cittadella in the first round and defeat Frosinone 1–0 over two legs in the semi-final. Struna was forced to miss the first leg of the final after picking up two yellow cards in the second leg against Frosinone. He would return in the second leg of the final, but Benevento would win 1–0 and earn promotion.

Struna returned to Palermo for the 2017–18 season, who had been relegated from Serie A the previous year. He made his first appearance of the season on 6 August 2017 in a 5–0 win over Virtus Francavilla in a Coppa Italia match. Struna made 35 Serie B appearances to help Palermo end the year with the second best defense, allowing only 39 goals in 42 matches, and finish in fourth place, qualifying for the promotion playoffs. Although he did not feature in either of the semi-final matches, he would start both of the final legs against Frosinone. However, Struna and Palermo would lose 3–2 on aggregate.

Struna made his first appearance for the 2018–19 season in a 2–1 win over Lecce on 21 October 2018. On 26 October 2018, Struna scored in the 90th minute to give Palermo a 1–1 draw with Venezia. With his contract set to expire at the end of the season and the club in a poor financial situation, Palermo agreed to sell Struna in the January transfer window.

=== Houston Dynamo ===
On 24 December 2018 Struna signed with the Houston Dynamo of Major League Soccer. He made his Dynamo debut on 19 February 2019 in a 1–0 victory over C.D. Guastatoya in a CONCACAF Champions League match. He missed the MLS season opener and the first leg of the quarterfinals tie with Tigres UANL due to a slight thigh injury. Struna returned to action on 9 March 2019, making his MLS debut in a 2–1 win over the Montreal Impact. While he was able to play in the second leg against Tigres, the Dynamo would lose 3–0 on aggregate. Struna had a strong debut season, playing in 29 league matches and picking up one assist, coming in a 4–2 win over the LA Galaxy on the last day of the season. He was voted as the Defensive Player of the Year by local members of the media and the technical staff. Despite Struna's strong performances, Houston ended the season in tenth place in the Western Conference, missing out on the MLS Cup Playoffs.

Struna and the Dynamo opened the 2020 season on 29 February with a 1–1 against the Galaxy. Struna was named to the MLS Team of the Week for his performance in the opening match. Following the second game of the year, the MLS season was paused due to the COVID-19 pandemic. During the break, Struna underwent arthroscopic knee surgery. MLS returned to play in July with the MLS is Back Tournament, with Struna playing in every game of the group stage as the Dynamo finished third in their group. He earned his second MLS Team of the Week of the season in Week 16 following a 2–0 win over FC Dallas in the Texas Derby on 7 October. For the final five games of the season, head coach Tab Ramos opted to bench Struna. He ended the season with 17 appearances from Houston's 23 games in an abbreviated season due to COVID-19. The Dynamo finished the season bottom of the Western Conference, failing to qualify for the playoffs.

=== CF Montréal ===
On 18 January 2021, Struna was traded from the Houston Dynamo to MLS side CF Montréal in return for forward Maximiliano Urruti and a 2022 MLS SuperDraft second-round pick. He made his Montréal debut on 17 April, coming on as a substitute in a 4–2 win over Canadian Classique rivals Toronto FC. On 26 June, Struna scored his first goal for Montréal in a 1–1 draw against Nashville SC. Following the 2021 season, Montréal opted to decline their contract option on Struna.

=== Perugia ===
On 3 November 2022, Struna signed with Italian second-tier Serie B club Perugia until the end of the 2022–23 season, with an option to extend.

== International career ==
Struna made his first youth international appearance with the Slovenian under-18 team, appearing in three friendlies in May 2008. He made his debut with the senior national team on 23 March 2016 in a 1–0 friendly win against Macedonia. The match was played at Bonifika Stadium, his old home stadium with FC Koper. Struna made his competitive debut for Slovenia on 8 October 2016 in a 2018 FIFA World Cup qualifier, getting the start in a 1–0 win over Slovakia. He scored his first international goal on 6 September 2019 in a 2–0 win over Poland in a UEFA 2020 Euro qualifying match.

== Personal life ==
Struna was born and raised in Piran. When he moved to Palermo, Struna got a large tattoo of Piran on his back. He is a big fan of basketball, particularly Michael Jordan and fellow Slovenians Goran Dragić and Luka Dončić. Struna says that he likes basketball more than football and would stay up to 4 am watching NBA games while living in Italy.

Struna's older brother Andraž Struna is also a Slovenian international footballer and was his teammate at FC Koper until 2010. Struna's nickname of "Kiki" originated because Andraž struggled to pronounce his brother's name and instead called him Kiki, which was the name of a candy he liked.

== Career statistics ==
=== Club ===
As of 3 August 2021

Appearances and goals by club, season and competition
| Club | Season | League | | | National cup (Note: Includes Slovenian Cup, Coppa Italia, US Open Cup) | | Continental | | Other | | Total | |
| Club | Season | Division | Apps | Goals | Apps | Goals | Apps | Goals | Apps | Goals | Apps | Goals |
|---|---|---|---|---|---|---|---|---|---|---|---|---|
| Koper | 2008–09 | PrvaLiga | 1 | 0 | 1 | 0 | — | | — | | 2 | 0 |
| Koper | 2009–10 | PrvaLiga | 15 | 1 | 2 | 0 | — | | — | | 17 | 1 |
| Koper | 2010–11 | PrvaLiga | 24 | 2 | 2 | 0 | 2 (Note: Appearance(s) in UEFA Champions League) | 0 | 0 | 0 | 28 | 2 |
| Koper | 2011–12 | PrvaLiga | 23 | 0 | 2 | 1 | 2 (Note: Appearance(s) in UEFA Europa League) | 0 | — | | 27 | 1 |
| Koper | Total | | 63 | 3 | 7 | 1 | 4 | 0 | 0 | 0 | 74 | 4 |
| Jadran Dekani (loan) | 2009–10 | 3. SNL | | | — | | — | | — | | | |
| Palermo | 2013–14 | Serie B | 1 | 0 | 0 | 0 | — | | — | | 1 | 0 |
| Palermo | 2015–16 | Serie A | 22 | 1 | 0 | 0 | — | | — | | 22 | 1 |
| Palermo | 2017–18 | Serie B | 35 | 0 | 2 | 0 | — | | 2 (Note: Appearance(s) in Serie B promotion play-offs) | 0 | 39 | 0 |
| Palermo | 2018–19 | Serie B | 5 | 1 | 0 | 0 | — | | — | | 5 | 1 |
| Palermo | Total | | 63 | 2 | 2 | 0 | 0 | 0 | 2 | 0 | 67 | 2 |
| Varese (loan) | 2012–13 | Serie B | 9 | 0 | 0 | 0 | — | | — | | 9 | 0 |
| Carpi (loan) | 2014–15 | Serie B | 34 | 1 | 0 | 0 | — | | — | | 34 | 1 |
| Carpi (loan) | 2016–17 | Serie B | 30 | 1 | 0 | 0 | — | | 4 | 0 | 34 | 1 |
| Carpi (loan) | Total | | 64 | 2 | 0 | 0 | 0 | 0 | 4 | 0 | 68 | 2 |
| Houston Dynamo | 2019 | Major League Soccer | 29 | 0 | 0 | 0 | 3 (Note: Appearance(s) in CONCACAF Champions League) | 0 | — | | 32 | 0 |
| Houston Dynamo | 2020 | Major League Soccer | 17 | 0 | 0 | 0 | — | | — | | 17 | 0 |
| Houston Dynamo | Total | | 46 | 0 | 0 | 0 | 3 | 0 | 0 | 0 | 49 | 0 |
| CF Montréal | 2021 | Major League Soccer | 12 | 1 | 0 | 0 | — | | — | | 12 | 1 |
| Career total | | | 257 | 8 | 9 | 1 | 7 | 0 | 6 | 0 | 279 | 9 |

=== International ===
Appearances and goals by national team and year
| National team | Year | Apps | Goals |
|---|---|---|---|
| Slovenia | 2016 | 6 | 0 |
| Slovenia | 2017 | 3 | 0 |
| Slovenia | 2018 | 3 | 0 |
| Slovenia | 2019 | 9 | 1 |
| Total | | 21 | 1 |

Scores and results list Slovenia's goal tally first, score column indicates score after each Struna goal.

List of international goals scored by Aljaž Struna
| No. | Date | Venue | Opponent | Score | Result | Competition |
|---|---|---|---|---|---|---|
| 1 | 6 September 2019 | Stožice Stadium, Ljubljana, Slovenia | Poland | 1–0 | 2–0 | UEFA Euro 2020 qualification |

== Honours ==
Koper

- Slovenian PrvaLiga: 2009–10
- Slovenian Supercup: 2010

Palermo

- Serie B: 2013–14

Carpi

- Serie B: 2014–15

Individual

- Dynamo Defensive Player of the Year: 2019
