= 2015 FC Dallas season =

FC Dallas
2015 season
- Owner: Clark Hunt
- Head coach: Óscar Pareja
- Stadium: Toyota Stadium
- MLS: Conference: 1st Overall: 2nd
- MLS Cup Playoffs: Lost Western Conference Finals vs. Portland Timbers, 3 – 5 (aggregate goals)
- Supporters' Shield: Runners-up
- U.S. Open Cup: Lost Fifth round vs. Sporting Kansas City (2–6)
- Texas Derby: Champions
- Brimstone Cup: Runners-up
- Pioneer Cup: Champions
- Top goalscorer: League: Fabián Castillo (10); All: Fabián Castillo & Michael Barrios (10)
- Highest home attendance: 21,907 (August 15 vs. LA Galaxy)
- Lowest home attendance: 11,848 (October 14 vs. Vancouver Whitecaps FC)
- Average home league attendance: Regular Season: 16,013; Playoffs: 19,127
Home colors	Away colors

The 2015 FC Dallas season was the club's 20th season in existence in Major League Soccer, the top tier of the American soccer pyramid. Including the Dallas Tornado soccer franchise of the original NASL, this is the 35th season of professional soccer in Dallas. The season saw the team finish first in the Western Conference in the regular season for the second time.

== Transfers ==
=== In ===
Date	Player	Pos	Previous club	Fee/notes	Ref
October 1, 2014	(United States) Alex Zendejas	MF	(United States) FC Dallas Academy	Signed on a homegrown player contract	
November 19, 2014	(United States) Dan Kennedy	GK	(United States) Chivas USA	First overall selection of 2014 MLS Dispersal Draft	
December 12, 2014	(Saint Kitts and Nevis) Atiba Harris	FW	(United States) San Jose Earthquakes	Selected in Stage Two of 2014 MLS Re-Entry Draft	
January 15, 2015	(England) Otis Earle	DF	(United States) University of California, Riverside	Selected as the 15th pick of 2015 MLS SuperDraft	
January 21, 2015	(Canada) Kyle Bekker	MF	(Canada) Toronto FC	Acquired in trade with Toronto FC in exchange for allocation money	
February 20, 2015	(Colombia) Michael Barrios	MF	(Colombia) Uniautónoma	Undisclosed	
May 26, 2015	(Panama) Rolando Escobar	MF	(Venezuela) Deportivo Anzoátegui	Undisclosed	
July 16, 2015	(Mali) Bakary Soumare	DF	(Canada) Montreal Impact	Acquired in trade with Montreal Impact in exchange for Kyle Bekker	

=== Out ===
Date	Player	Pos	Destination club	Fee/notes	Ref
December 2, 2014	(Peru) Raúl Fernández	GK	(Peru) Universitario de Deportes	2015 option declined	
December 2, 2014	(Colombia) Jair Benítez	DF	(Colombia) Águilas Pereira	2015 option declined	
December 2, 2014	(Scotland) Adam Moffat	MF	(United States) New York Cosmos	2015 option declined	
December 2, 2014	(France) Peter Luccin	MF	Free agent	2015 option declined	
December 2, 2014	(United States) George John	DF	(United States) New York City FC	2015 option declined	
December 2, 2014	(Honduras) Hendry Thomas	MF	(United States) Fort Lauderdale Strikers	2015 option declined	
December 2, 2014	(Paraguay) Walter Cabrera	DF	(Paraguay) General Díaz FC	2015 option declined	
December 2, 2014	(United States) Jonathan Top	FW	(United States) Arizona United SC	2015 option declined	
December 2, 2014	(Colombia) Andrés Escobar	DF	(Colombia) Atlético Nacional	2015 option declined	
December 2, 2014	(Trinidad and Tobago) Nick Walker	DF	(Puerto Rico) Bayamón F.C.	2015 option declined	
February 5, 2015	(United States) Brian Span	FW	(Finland) IFK Mariehamn	Waived	
July 16, 2015	(Canada) Kyle Bekker	MF	(Canada) Montreal Impact	Traded to Montreal Impact in exchange for Bakary Soumare	

=== Loan in ===
Date	Player	Pos	Previous club	Fee/notes	Ref
July 22, 2015	(Argentina) Ezequiel Cirigliano	MF	(Argentina) Club Atlético River Plate	On loan from Argentine club River Plate for the remainder of the 2015 season	

=== Loan out ===
Date	Player	Pos	Destination club	Fee/notes	Ref
April 27, 2015	(United States) Danny Garcia (HGP)	MF	(United States) Arizona United SC	On loan to USL Pro affiliate Arizona United SC for the 2015 season	
June 18, 2015	(England) Otis Earle	DF	(United States) Arizona United SC	On loan to Arizona United SC for the 2015 season	
August 8, 2015	(Mexico) Jesse Gonzalez	GK	(United States) Pittsburgh Riverhounds	On loan to USL Pro club Pittsburgh Riverhounds for game against USL Pro club Toronto FC II	

=== Roster ===
As of July 22, 2015. Note: Flags indicate national team as defined under FIFA eligibility rules; some limited exceptions apply. Players may hold more than one non-FIFA nationality.

No.	Pos.	Nation	Player
1	GK	USA	Dan Kennedy
3	DF	GUA	Moises Hernandez (HGP)
4	DF	MLI	Bakary Soumare
5	MF	ARG	Ezequiel Cirigliano (on loan from River Plate)
7	FW	PAN	Blas Pérez
8	MF	MEX	Victor Ulloa (HGP)
9	FW	URU	David Texeira
10	MF	ARG	Mauro Díaz (DP)
11	FW	COL	Fabián Castillo (DP)
12	MF	USA	Ryan Hollingshead
13	FW	CAN	Tesho Akindele
14	FW	SKN	Atiba Harris
16	MF	USA	Coy Craft (HGP)
17	DF	USA	Zach Loyd

No.	Pos.	Nation	Player
18	GK	USA	Chris Seitz
20	MF	PAN	Rolando Escobar
21	MF	COL	Michael Barrios
22	DF	USA	Stephen Keel
23	MF	USA	Kellyn Acosta (HGP)
24	DF	USA	Matt Hedges
25	DF	USA	Walker Zimmerman (GA)
26	MF	USA	Danny Garcia (HGP)
27	MF	JAM	Je-Vaughn Watson
29	FW	USA	Alex Zendejas (HGP)
31	MF	BRA	Michel
33	DF	ENG	Otis Earle
44	GK	MEX	Jesse Gonzalez (HGP)

== Competitions ==
=== Match results ===
Win Draw Loss Canceled

=== Preseason ===
February 4, 2015	Orlando City SC	4–0	FC Dallas	Davenport, Florida
11:00 a.m. CST	Cascio 13'; Paterson 20'; Kaká 33' (pen.); Mwanga 64'	Report		Stadium: ChampionsGate Sports Field Complex

February 7, 2015	FC Dallas	1–1	Jönköpings Södra IF	Bradenton, Florida
6:00 p.m. CST	Harris 34'	Report	Silka 38'	Stadium: IMG Academy Stadium

February 13, 2015 ATX Pro Challenge Semi Final	FC Dallas	3–1	Columbus Crew SC	Austin, Texas
5:45PM CST	Pérez 29'; Hollingshead 38', 44'; Harris (yellow card) 43'; Toja (yellow card) 71'	Report	Kamara (yellow card) 28'; Parkhurst (yellow card) 45'; Tchani (yellow card) 60'; Steindórsson 65'	Stadium: Mike A. Myers Stadium; Referee: Ismail Elfath

February 15, 2015 ATX Pro Challenge Final	FC Dallas	0–1	D.C. United	Austin, Texas
3:15PM CST	Castillo (yellow card) 70'; Toja (yellow card) 84'	Report	Arnaud (yellow card) 13'; Rolfe 54'	Stadium: Mike A. Myers Stadium; Referee: Younes Marrakchi

February 20, 2015	FC Dallas	3–1	D.C. United	Frisco, Texas
7:30 p.m. CST	Michel (red card) 23'; Hollingshead 27'; Pérez (yellow card) 24'; Zimmerman (yellow card) 52'; Castillo 79'; Akindele 88' (pen.)	Report	Arnaud (yellow card) 56'; Arrieta (yellow card) 61' (goal) 62'; Espíndola (yellow card) 78'	Stadium: Toyota Stadium; Referee: Armando Villarreal

February 28, 2015 deeproot Funds Cup	San Antonio Scorpions	2–1	FC Dallas	San Antonio, Texas
7:00 p.m. CST	Palomeque 70'; Elizondo 88'	Report	Meyer (yellow card) 27'; Agudelo 89'	Stadium: Toyota Field

=== Major League Soccer ===
==== Western Conference standings ====
Western Conference

Pos	Team	Pld	W	L	T	GF	GA	GD	Pts	Qualification
1	FC Dallas	34	18	10	6	52	39	+13	60	MLS Cup Conference Semifinals
2	Vancouver Whitecaps FC	34	16	13	5	45	36	+9	53	MLS Cup Conference Semifinals
3	Portland Timbers	34	15	11	8	41	39	+2	53	MLS Cup Knockout Round
4	Seattle Sounders FC	34	15	13	6	44	36	+8	51	MLS Cup Knockout Round
5	LA Galaxy	34	14	11	9	56	46	+10	51	MLS Cup Knockout Round
6	Sporting Kansas City	34	14	11	9	48	45	+3	51	MLS Cup Knockout Round
7	San Jose Earthquakes	34	13	13	8	41	39	+2	47	
8	Houston Dynamo	34	11	14	9	42	49	−7	42	
9	Real Salt Lake	34	11	15	8	38	48	−10	41	
10	Colorado Rapids	34	9	15	10	33	43	−10	37	

Source: MLS

==== Overall standings ====
Pos	Team	Pld	W	L	T	GF	GA	GD	Pts	Qualification
1	New York Red Bulls (S)	34	18	10	6	62	43	+19	60	CONCACAF Champions League
2	FC Dallas	34	18	10	6	52	39	+13	60	CONCACAF Champions League
3	Vancouver Whitecaps FC	34	16	13	5	45	36	+9	53	CONCACAF Champions League
4	Columbus Crew	34	15	11	8	58	53	+5	53	
5	Portland Timbers (C)	34	15	11	8	41	39	+2	53	CONCACAF Champions League
6	Seattle Sounders FC	34	15	13	6	44	36	+8	51	
7	Montreal Impact	34	15	13	6	48	44	+4	51	
8	D.C. United	34	15	13	6	43	45	−2	51	
9	LA Galaxy	34	14	11	9	56	46	+10	51	
10	Sporting Kansas City	34	14	11	9	48	45	+3	51	CONCACAF Champions League
11	New England Revolution	34	14	12	8	48	47	+1	50	
12	Toronto FC	34	15	15	4	58	58	0	49	
13	San Jose Earthquakes	34	13	13	8	41	39	+2	47	
14	Orlando City SC	34	12	14	8	46	56	−10	44	
15	Houston Dynamo	34	11	14	9	42	49	−7	42	
16	Real Salt Lake	34	11	15	8	38	48	−10	41	
17	New York City FC	34	10	17	7	49	58	−9	37	
18	Philadelphia Union	34	10	17	7	42	55	−13	37	
19	Colorado Rapids	34	9	15	10	33	43	−10	37	
20	Chicago Fire	34	8	20	6	43	58	−15	30	

Source: MLS
Rules for classification: 1) points; 2) total wins; 3) total goal differential; 4) total goals scored
(C) MLS Cup Champion; (S) Supporters' Shield

==== Results summary ====
Overall								Home						Away					
Pld	W	D	L	GF	GA	GD	Pts	W	D	L	GF	GA	GD	W	D	L	GF	GA	GD
34	18	6	10	52	39	+13	60	13	2	2	33	15	+18	5	4	8	19	24	−5

Last updated: October 25, 2015.
Source: Regular Season

==== Results by round ====
Round	1	2	3	4	5	6	7	8	9	10	11	12	13	14	15	16	17	18	19	20	21	22	23	24	25	26	27	28	29	30	31	32	33	34
Stadium	H	H	A	H	A	H	H	A	A	H	H	A	A	A	A	A	H	H	A	H	H	A	H	A	H	A	H	A	A	H	A	H	A	H
Result	W	W	W	D	L	L	W	D	W	W	D	L	L	D	L	D	W	W	W	W	W	L	L	L	W	W	W	L	L	W	D	W	W	W

Updated to match(es) played on October 25, 2015. Source: Regular Season
A = Away; H = Home; W = Win; D = Draw; L = Loss

==== Regular season ====
Kickoff times are in CDT (UTC-05) unless shown otherwise

March 7, 2015 1	FC Dallas	1–0	San Jose Earthquakes	Frisco, Texas
7:30 p.m. CST (UTC-06)	Harris (yellow card) 50'; Pérez 90+2'	Report	Francis (yellow card) 67'; Salinas (yellow card) 77'; Nyassi (yellow card) 90+2'; Jahn (yellow card) 90+4'	Stadium: Toyota Stadium; Attendance: 15,236; Referee: Ted Unkel

March 14, 2015 2	FC Dallas	3–1	Sporting Kansas City	Frisco, Texas
7:30 p.m. CDT (UTC-05)	Pérez 17', 52'; Harris (yellow card) 35'; Castillo 73'; Bekker (yellow card) 90'	Report	Zusi (yellow card) 41'; Espinoza 44'; Ellis (yellow card) 90'	Stadium: Toyota Stadium; Attendance: 14,149; Referee: Antonio Marrufo

March 21, 2015 3	Philadelphia Union	0–2	FC Dallas	Chester, Pennsylvania
3:00 p.m. CDT (UTC-05)	Nogueira (yellow card) 23'; Fabinho (yellow card) 32'; Pfeffer (red card) 42'; Le Toux (yellow card) 86'	Report	Michel (yellow card) 26'; Ulloa (yellow card) 31'; Akindele 49'; Hollingshead 59' (yellow card) 90+1'	Stadium: PPL Park; Attendance: 16,031; Referee: Jose Carlos Rivero

March 28, 2015 4	FC Dallas	0–0	Seattle Sounders FC	Frisco, Texas
7:30 p.m. CDT (UTC-05)	Acosta (red card) 17'; Zimmerman (yellow card) 80'	Report	Azira (yellow card) 84'; González (yellow card) 90+2'	Stadium: Toyota Stadium; Attendance: 18,333; Referee: Kevin Stott

April 4, 2015 5	Portland Timbers	3–1	FC Dallas	Portland, Oregon
9:30 p.m. CDT (UTC-05)	Borchers 23'; Urruti 62'; Ridgewell (yellow card) 64'; Chara 87'	Report	Texeira (yellow card) 15'; Akindele 29'; Harris (yellow card) 65'	Stadium: Providence Park; Attendance: 21,144; Referee: Ricardo Salazar

April 10, 2015 6	FC Dallas	0–4	Colorado Rapids	Frisco, Texas
6:00 p.m. CDT (UTC-05)	Hollingshead (yellow card) 59'; Watson (yellow card) 90+2'	Report	Badji 2'; Powers 43'; Torres 70'; Serna 85'	Stadium: Toyota Stadium; Attendance: 12,929; Referee: Armando Villarreal

April 18, 2015 7	FC Dallas	3–2	Toronto FC	Frisco, Texas
7:30 p.m. CDT (UTC-05)	Castillo 1', 10'; Pérez 27'	Report	Bradley (yellow card) 70'; Hagglund (yellow card) 80'; Giovinco 83', 89'; Perquis (yellow card) 90+1'	Stadium: Toyota Stadium; Attendance: 16,176; Referee: Ismail Elfath

April 24, 2015 8	Colorado Rapids	1–1	FC Dallas	Commerce City, Colorado
9:00 p.m. CDT (UTC-05)	Moor (yellow card) 58'; LaBrocca 70'	Report	Hedges (yellow card) 7'; Díaz 31'; Castillo (yellow card) 50'; Pérez (red card) 59'; Acosta (yellow card) 60'; Kennedy (yellow card) 66'	Stadium: Dick's Sporting Goods Park; Attendance: 12,944; Referee: Allen Chapman

May 1, 2015 9 Texas Derby	Houston Dynamo	1–4	FC Dallas	Houston, Texas
7:00 p.m. CDT (UTC-05)	Barnes 32'	Report	Hollingshead 9'; Texeira 21'; Hernandez (yellow card) 39'; Díaz 52'; Castillo 55'	Stadium: BBVA Compass Stadium; Attendance: 19,975; Referee: Jair Marrufo

May 9, 2015 10	FC Dallas	2–1	LA Galaxy	Frisco, Texas
7:30 p.m. CDT (UTC-05)	Hernandez (yellow card) 33'; Pérez 77'; Akindele 86'	Report	Gargan (yellow card) 41'; Zardes 59'; Ishizaki (yellow card) 65'	Stadium: Toyota Stadium; Attendance: 13,829; Referee: Kevin Stott

May 15, 2015 11	FC Dallas	0–0	New York Red Bulls	Frisco, Texas
8:00 p.m. CDT (UTC-05)		Report	Perrinelle (yellow card) 34'; Kliestan (yellow card) 56'	Stadium: Toyota Stadium; Attendance: 12,640; Referee: Ricardo Salazar

May 23, 2015 12	Montreal Impact	2–1	FC Dallas	Montreal, Quebec
7:00 p.m. CDT (UTC-05)	Piatti 25' (pen.); Soumaré (yellow card) 26'; Donadel (yellow card) 29'; McInerney 50' (yellow card) 90+3'; Romero (yellow card) 58'; Mallace (yellow card) 87'	Report	Hedges (yellow card) 75' (goal) 77'	Stadium: Saputo Stadium; Attendance: 13,020; Referee: Chris Penso

May 29, 2015 13	Sporting Kansas City	4–0	FC Dallas	Kansas City, Kansas
8:00 p.m. CDT (UTC-05)	Németh 19'; Feilhaber 51'; Ellis 57'; Zusi 64'	Report	Loyd (yellow card) 33' (yellow-red card) 43'	Stadium: Sporting Park; Attendance: 20,172; Referee: David Gantar

June 7, 2015 14	San Jose Earthquakes	0–0	FC Dallas	San Jose, California
6:00 p.m. CDT (UTC-05)	Wynne (yellow card) 11'; Sherrod (red card) 53'; Koval (red card) 87'	Report	Ulloa (yellow card) 16'; Michel (yellow card) 40'; Díaz (yellow card) 40'; Watson (red card) 75'	Stadium: Avaya Stadium; Attendance: 18,000; Referee: Baldomero Toledo

June 13, 2015 15	Seattle Sounders FC	3–0	FC Dallas	Seattle, Washington
TBD CDT (UTC-05)	Evans (yellow card) 50'; Neagle 55'; Martins 73'; González 90+2'	Report	Ulloa (yellow card) 49'; Pérez (yellow card) 85'	Stadium: CenturyLink Field; Attendance: 41,108; Referee: Alan Kelly

June 19, 2015 16	Colorado Rapids	1–1	FC Dallas	Commerce City, Colorado
8:00 p.m. CDT (UTC-05)	Burling (yellow card) 9'; Riley (yellow card) 84'; Serna 88'	Report	Ulloa (yellow card) 18'; Castillo 71'; Kennedy (yellow card) 80'	Stadium: Dick's Sporting Goods Park; Attendance: 15,585; Referee: Armando Villarreal

June 26, 2015 17 Texas Derby	FC Dallas	2–0	Houston Dynamo	Frisco, Texas
8:00 p.m. CDT (UTC-05)	Taylor 33' (o.g.); Castillo 42'; Acosta (yellow card) 54'; Hedges (yellow card) 66'; Harris (yellow card) 68'	Report	Horst (yellow card) 30'; Barnes (yellow card) 42'; Taylor (yellow card) 77'	Stadium: Toyota Stadium; Attendance: 15,037; Referee: Chris Penso

July 4, 2015 18	FC Dallas	3–0	New England Revolution	Frisco, Texas
8:00 p.m. CDT (UTC-05)	Díaz 9'; Castillo 64'; Barrios 73'; Loyd (yellow card) 84'	Report	Caldwell (yellow card) 76'	Stadium: Toyota Stadium; Attendance: 19,140; Referee: Baldomero Toledo

July 11, 2015 19	Orlando City SC	0–2	FC Dallas	Orlando, Florida
6:30 p.m. CDT (UTC-05)	Boden (yellow card) 77' (yellow-red card) 90+1'	Report	Díaz 45+1' (pen.); Texeira 64'; Hollingshead (yellow card) 77'; Kennedy (yellow card) 88'	Stadium: Citrus Bowl; Attendance: 30,513; Referee: Juan Guzman

July 18, 2015 20	FC Dallas	2–1	D.C. United	Frisco, Texas
8:00 p.m. CDT (UTC-05)	Acosta 73'; Castillo 90+2'	Report	Hedges 77' (o.g.); Arrieta (yellow card) 90+4'	Stadium: Toyota Stadium; Attendance: 16,215; Referee: Allen Chapman

July 25, 2015 21	FC Dallas	4–1	Portland Timbers	Frisco, Texas
8:00 p.m. CDT (UTC-05)	Barrios 12', 22'; Hollingshead (yellow card) 65'; Acosta 69'; Harris (yellow card) 74'; Díaz 87' (pen.)	Report	Adi 90+3' (pen.)	Stadium: Toyota Stadium; Attendance: 15,992; Referee: Ismail Elfath

August 2, 2015 22 Brimstone Cup	Chicago Fire	2–0	FC Dallas	Bridgeview, Illinois
6:00 p.m. CDT (UTC-05)	Accam 4'; Watson (red card) 79'; Maloney 85' (pen.)	Report	Díaz (yellow card) 35'; Akindele (yellow card) 48'; Acosta (yellow card) 76'	Stadium: Toyota Park; Attendance: 14,209; Referee: Jair Marrufo

August 15, 2015 23	FC Dallas	1–2	LA Galaxy	Frisco, Texas
8:00 p.m. CDT (UTC-05)	Barrios 33'; Acosta (yellow card) 38'; Pérez (yellow card) 63'	Report	Keane 51', 56'; DeLaGarza (yellow card) 57'; Ricketts (yellow card) 77'; Zardes (yellow card) 90+1'	Stadium: Toyota Stadium; Attendance: 21,907; Referee: Ricardo Salazar

August 22, 2015 24	Vancouver Whitecaps FC	1–0	FC Dallas	Vancouver, British Columbia
TBD CDT (UTC-05)	Techera (yellow card) 24' (goal) 32'; Dean (yellow card) 85'	Report	Harris (yellow card) 35'	Stadium: BC Place; Attendance: 21,000; Referee: Ismail Elfath

August 29, 2015 25	FC Dallas	2–0	Real Salt Lake	Frisco, Texas
8:00 p.m. CDT (UTC-05)	Akindele 51' (pen.); Hedges (yellow card) 66'; Castillo 79'; Watson (yellow card) 84'	Report	Mulholland (yellow card) 38'; Phillips (yellow card) 40'; Morales (yellow card) 51'; Beltran (yellow card) 67'	Stadium: Toyota Stadium; Attendance: 18,172; Referee: Ted Unkel

September 6, 2015 26 Pioneer Cup	Columbus Crew SC	0–3	FC Dallas	Columbus, Ohio
6:00 p.m. CDT (UTC-05)		Report	Harris 27'; Gonzalez (yellow card) 63'; Barrios 69'; Texeira 71'	Stadium: Mapfre Stadium; Attendance: 20,217; Referee: Baldomero Toledo

September 12, 2015 27	FC Dallas	2–1	New York City FC	Frisco, Texas
7:30 p.m. CDT (UTC-05)	Harris (yellow card) 30'; Akindele 45'; Michel 45+4' (yellow card) 64'	Report	Wingert (yellow card) 62'; Mullins 70' (pen.)	Stadium: Toyota Stadium; Attendance: 16,937; Referee: Alan Kelly

September 18, 2015 28	Sporting Kansas City	3–1	FC Dallas	Kansas City, Kansas
6:00 p.m. CDT (UTC-05)	Feilhaber 65', 76' (pen.); Dwyer 83'; Anor (yellow card) 86'	Report	Ulloa 83'	Stadium: Sporting Park; Attendance: 18,861; Referee: Mark Geiger

September 27, 2015 29	LA Galaxy	3–2	FC Dallas	Carson, California
8:30 p.m. CDT (UTC-05)	Giovani 11'; Keane 14'; Gerrard 57'; Juninho (yellow card) 69'; Gordon (yellow card) 90+4'	Report	Barrios 35'; Harris 86'	Stadium: StubHub Center; Attendance: 27,000; Referee: Baldomero Toledo

October 4, 2015 30 Texas Derby	FC Dallas	4–1	Houston Dynamo	Frisco, Texas
4:00 p.m. CDT (UTC-05)	Díaz 25' (pen.); Texeira 51', 90+3'; Acosta 53'; Harris (yellow card) 55'	Report	Clark 36'; Davis (yellow card) 37'; Miranda (yellow card) 42'; Rodríguez (red card) 90'	Stadium: Toyota Stadium; Attendance: 11,000; Referee: Chris Penso

October 7, 2015 31	Vancouver Whitecaps FC	0–0	FC Dallas	Vancouver, British Columbia
9:00 p.m. CDT (UTC-05)		Report		Stadium: BC Place; Attendance: 19,339; Referee: Ismail Elfath

October 14, 2015 32	FC Dallas	2–0	Vancouver Whitecaps FC	Frisco, Texas
8:00 p.m. CDT (UTC-05)	Barrios 32'; Díaz 52'; Akindele (yellow card) 64'; Watson (yellow card) 80'	Report	Kah (yellow card) 46'; Harvey (yellow card) 55'	Stadium: Toyota Stadium; Attendance: 11,848; Referee: Jose Carlos Rivero

October 17, 2015 33	Real Salt Lake	0–1	FC Dallas	Sandy, Utah
8:30 p.m. CDT (UTC-05)	Beltran (yellow card) 26'; Beckerman (yellow card) 53'; Vásquez (yellow card) 60'; Martínez (yellow card) 62'; Stertzer (yellow card) 85'	Report	Texeira 57'; Watson (yellow card) 66'; Gonzalez (yellow card) 90+5'	Stadium: Rio Tinto Stadium; Attendance: 19,899; Referee: Jorge González

October 25, 2015 34	FC Dallas	2–1	San Jose Earthquakes	Frisco, Texas
6:00 p.m. CDT (UTC-05)	Díaz 38' (yellow card) 67'; Ulloa 79'	Report	Amarikwa 13'; Bernárdez (yellow card) 27'; García (red card) 67'; Pelosi (yellow card) 71'; Goodson (yellow card) 74'	Stadium: Toyota Stadium; Attendance: 16,937; Referee: Armando Villarreal

=== MLS Cup Playoffs ===
==== Western Conference Semifinals ====
November 1, 2015 Leg 1	Seattle Sounders FC	2–1	FC Dallas	Seattle, Washington
8:30 p.m. CST (UTC-06)	Ivanschitz 67'; Dempsey 86'	Report	Castillo 18'	Stadium: CenturyLink Field; Attendance: 39,599; Referee: Kevin Stott

November 8, 2015 Leg 2	FC Dallas	2–1 (SO) (3–3 agg.) (4–2 p)	Seattle Sounders FC	Frisco, Texas
6:30 p.m. CST (UTC-06)	Díaz (yellow card) 46'; Pérez (yellow card) 83'; Akindele 84'; Zimmerman 90+1'	Report	Friberg (yellow card) 70'; Marshall 90'; Pappa (yellow card) 95'; Ivanschitz (yellow card) 111'	Stadium: Toyota Stadium; Attendance: 17,287; Referee: Baldomero Toledo
	Penalties
	Díaz (penalty scored); Hollingshead (penalty scored); Akindele (penalty scored); Zimmerman (penalty scored)		(penalty scored) Dempsey; (penalty missed) Ivanschitz; (penalty missed) Barrett; (penalty scored) Rose

==== Western Conference Finals ====
November 22, 2015 Leg 1	Portland Timbers	3–1	FC Dallas	Portland, Oregon
6:30 p.m. CST (UTC-06)	Ridgewell 23'; Villafaña (yellow card) 38'; Asprilla 53'; Chara (yellow card) 78'; Borchers 90+1'	Report	Texeira 62'; Acosta (yellow card) 86'	Stadium: Providence Park; Attendance: 21,144; Referee: Ted Unkel

November 29, 2015 Leg 2	FC Dallas	2–2 (3–5 agg.)	Portland Timbers	Frisco, Texas
4:00 p.m. CST (UTC-06)	Hollingshead 68'; Pérez 73'; Acosta (yellow card) 80'	Report	Adi 54'; Chara (yellow card) 72'; Melano 90+5'	Stadium: Toyota Stadium; Attendance: 20,966; Referee: Ismail Elfath

=== U.S. Open Cup ===
FC Dallas entered the 2015 U.S. Open Cup with the rest of Major League Soccer in the fourth round.

June 16, 2015 Fourth round	FC Dallas (Texas)	4–1	Oklahoma City Energy FC	Fort Worth, Texas
8:00 PM CDT (UTC-05)	Texeira 21', 51'; Loyd (yellow card) 31'; Barrios 34', 36'	Report	König 82'	Stadium: Garvey-Rosenthal Soccer Stadium; Attendance: 1,106; Referee: Daniel Fitzgerald

July 1, 2015 Fifth round	Sporting Kansas City	6–2	(Texas) FC Dallas	Kansas City, Kansas
7:30 PM CDT (UTC-05)	Dwyer 5', 30', 41' (pen.), 69'; Németh 45+1', 59'	Report	Michel (yellow card) 15'; Barrios 62'; Zimmerman (yellow card) 68'; Acosta 73'	Stadium: Sporting Park; Attendance: 19,113; Referee: Robert Sibiga

== Statistics ==
=== Appearances ===
Numbers outside parentheses denote appearances as starter.
Numbers in parentheses denote appearances as substitute.
Players with no appearances are not included in the list.

As of final match played November 29, 2015

No.	Pos.	Nat.	Name	MLS	U.S. Open Cup	Total
No.	Pos.	Nat.	Name	Apps	Apps	Apps
1	GK	USA	Dan Kennedy	15	0	15
3	DF	GUA	Moises Hernandez	11(3)	1	12(3)
4	MF	CAN	Kyle Bekker	2(6)	1	3(6)
5	MF	ARG	Ezequiel Cirigliano	6(2)	0	6(2)
7	FW	PAN	Blas Pérez	14(12)	0	14(12)
8	MF	MEX	Victor Ulloa	37	1(1)	38(1)
9	FW	URU	David Texeira	23(3)	2	25(3)
10	MF	ARG	Mauro Díaz	28	0	28
11	FW	COL	Fabián Castillo	32(2)	1	33(2)
12	MF	USA	Ryan Hollingshead	29(8)	2	31(8)
13	FW	CAN	Tesho Akindele	14(18)	0	14(18)
14	DF	SKN	Atiba Harris	20(7)	1	21(7)
16	FW	USA	Coy Craft	1(1)	(1)	1(2)
17	DF	USA	Zach Loyd	31	1	32
18	GK	USA	Chris Seitz	7	2	9
20	MF	PAN	Rolando Escobar	2(12)	1	3(12)
21	MF	COL	Michael Barrios	23(7)	2	25(7)
23	DF	USA	Kellyn Acosta	22(2)	(2)	22(4)
24	DF	USA	Matt Hedges	34(1)	1	35(1)
25	DF	USA	Walker Zimmerman	11(11)	2	13(11)
27	MF	JAM	Je-Vaughn Watson	26(1)	1	27(1)
29	MF	USA	Alex Zendejas	2(6)	1(1)	3(7)
31	MF	BRA	Michel	12(7)	2	14(7)
33	DF	ENG	Otis Earle	0	(1)	(1)
44	GK	MEX	Jesse Gonzalez	15	0	15

=== Goals and assists ===
As of final match played November 29, 2015

No.	Pos.	Name	MLS		U.S. Open Cup		Total	
No.	Pos.	Name	Goals	Assists	Goals	Assists	Goals	Assists
3	DF	(United States) Moises Hernandez	0	2	0	0	0	2
4	MF	(Canada) Kyle Bekker	0	1	0	0	0	1
7	FW	(Panama) Blas Pérez	6	2	0	0	6	2
8	MF	(Mexico) Victor Ulloa	2	1	0	0	2	1
9	FW	(Uruguay) David Texeira	7	3	2	1	9	4
10	MF	(Argentina) Mauro Díaz	8	14	0	0	8	14
11	FW	(Colombia) Fabián Castillo	10	9	0	1	10	10
12	MF	(United States) Ryan Hollingshead	3	3	0	0	3	3
13	FW	(Canada) Tesho Akindele	6	1	0	0	6	1
14	DF	(Saint Kitts and Nevis) Atiba Harris	2	2	0	0	2	2
17	DF	(United States) Zach Loyd	0	1	0	0	0	1
18	GK	(United States) Chris Seitz	0	0	0	1	0	1
20	MF	(Panama) Rolando Escobar	0	0	0	1	0	1
21	MF	(Colombia) Michael Barrios	7	2	3	1	10	3
23	MF	(United States) Kellyn Acosta	3	2	1	0	4	2
24	DF	(United States) Matt Hedges	1	1	0	0	1	1
25	DF	(United States) Walker Zimmerman	1	0	0	0	1	0
27	MF	(Jamaica) Je-Vaughn Watson	0	2	0	0	0	2
31	MF	(Brazil) Michel	1	4	0	0	1	4
			1	0	0	0	1	0
Total			58	50	6	5	64	55

=== Disciplinary record ===
As of final match played November 29, 2015

No.	Pos.	Name	MLS		U.S. Open Cup		Total	
No.	Pos.	Name	Booked	Sent off (straight red)	Booked	Sent off (straight red)	Booked	Sent off (straight red)
1	GK	(United States) Dan Kennedy	3	0	0	0	3	0
3	DF	(United States) Moises Hernandez	2	0	0	0	2	0
4	MF	(Canada) Kyle Bekker	1	0	0	0	1	0
7	FW	(Panama) Blas Pérez	3	1	0	0	3	1
8	MF	(Mexico) Victor Ulloa	4	0	0	0	4	0
9	FW	(Uruguay) David Texeira	1	0	0	0	1	0
10	MF	(Argentina) Mauro Díaz	4	0	0	0	4	0
11	FW	(Colombia) Fabian Castillo	1	0	0	0	1	0
12	MF	(United States) Ryan Hollingshead	4	0	0	0	4	0
13	FW	(Canada) Tesho Akindele	2	0	0	0	2	0
14	DF	(Saint Kitts and Nevis) Atiba Harris	8	0	0	0	8	0
17	DF	(United States) Zach Loyd	2	1	1	0	3	1
23	DF	(United States) Kellyn Acosta	6	1	0	0	6	1
24	DF	(United States) Matt Hedges	4	0	0	0	4	0
25	DF	(United States) Walker Zimmerman	1	0	1	0	2	0
27	MF	(Jamaica) Je-Vaughn Watson	4	1	0	0	4	1
31	MF	(Brazil) Michel	3	0	1	0	4	0
44	GK	(Mexico) Jesse Gonzalez	2	0	0	0	2	0
Total			54	4	3	0	57	4

== Kits ==
Primary	Secondary	Secondary Alt.

Type	Shirt	Shorts	Socks	First appearance / Info
Primary	Red / Dark Red hoops	Red	Red / Dark Red hoops	MLS, March 7 against San Jose Earthquakes
Secondary	White / Blue hoops	Blue	Blue / White hoops	MLS, April 24 against Colorado Rapids
Secondary Alternate	White / Blue hoops	White	Blue / White hoops	MLS, April 18 against Toronto FC

== See also ==
- FC Dallas
- 2015 in American soccer
- 2015 Major League Soccer season
