= 2014 FC Dallas season =

FC Dallas
2014 season
- Owner: Clark Hunt
- Head coach: Óscar Pareja
- Stadium: Toyota Stadium
- MLS: Western Conference: 4th Overall: 6th
- MLS Cup Playoffs: Lost Western Conference Semifinals vs. Seattle Sounders FC; 1-1 aggregate (away goal rule)
- U.S. Open Cup: Lost Semifinal vs. Philadelphia Union (1-1, OT) (3-4 SO)
- Texas Derby: Champions
- Brimstone Cup: Runners-up
- Highest home attendance: 21,182 vs. Philadelphia Union (July 4)
- Lowest home attendance: 10,279 vs. Vancouver Whitecaps FC (October 29)
- Average home league attendance: Regular season: 16,816; Playoffs: 13,196
Home colors	Away colors

The 2014 FC Dallas season was the club's nineteenth season in existence in Major League Soccer, the top tier of American soccer.

== Transfers ==
=== In ===
Date	Player	Pos	Previous club	Fee/notes	Ref
December 9, 2013	(United States) Ryan Hollingshead	MF	(United States) UCLA	Signed as 20th overall pick of the 2013 MLS SuperDraft	
December 13, 2013	(Scotland) Adam Moffat	MF	(United States) Seattle Sounders FC	Acquired from Seattle Sounders FC in exchange for allocation money and the rights to negotiate contract with Kenny Cooper	
January 9, 2014	(United States) Brian Span	MF	(Sweden) Djurgårdens IF	Acquired in weighted lottery conducted by MLS	
February 12, 2014	(Honduras) Hendry Thomas	MF	(United States) Colorado Rapids	Acquired in exchange for allocation money	
February 21, 2014	(Uruguay) David Texeira	FW	(Netherlands) FC Groningen	Acquired as Designated Player	
February 27, 2014	(Canada) Tesho Akindele	FW	(United States) Colorado School of Mines	Signed as 6th overall pick of the 2014 MLS SuperDraft	
February 27, 2014	(Trinidad and Tobago) Nick Walker	DF	(United States) Fairleigh Dickinson	Signed as 43rd overall pick of the 2014 MLS SuperDraft	
August 1, 2014	(United States) Coy Craft	DF	(United States) FC Dallas Academy	Signed on a homegrown player contract	

=== Out ===
Date	Player	Pos	Destination club	Fee/notes	Ref
November 11, 2013	(Colombia) David Ferreira	MF	(Colombia) Independiente Santa Fe	2014 option declined	
November 11, 2013	(Honduras) Ramón Núñez	MF	(Costa Rica) Alajuelense	2014 option declined	
November 11, 2013	(Brazil) Erick	MF	(Cyprus) Ermis Aradippou	2014 option declined	
December 9, 2013	(Brazil) Jackson	MF	(Canada) Toronto FC	Traded to Toronto FC for allocation money and a conditional second-round pick in the 2015 MLS SuperDraft	
December 9, 2013	(United States) Kenny Cooper	FW	(United States) Seattle Sounders FC	Released to Seattle Sounders FC along with allocation money in exchange for Adam Moffat	
February 26, 2014	(United States) Bobby Warshaw	MF	(Sweden) GAIS	Transferred to Swedish club GAIS	
February 26, 2014	(United States) Bradlee Baladez	FW	(United States) Arizona United SC	Waived	
February 26, 2014	(United States) Kyle Zobeck	GK	(United States) New York Cosmos	Waived	
March 7, 2014	(France) Eric Hassli	FW	(United States) San Antonio Scorpions	Mutually agreed to terminate contract	
March 20, 2014	(United States) London Woodberry (HGP)	DF	(United States) Arizona United SC	Waived	
June 24, 2014	(Mexico) Richard Sánchez	GK	(Mexico) Tigres UANL	Transferred to Mexican club Tigres UANL	
July 29, 2014	(United States) Andrew Jacobson	MF	(United States) New York City FC	Traded to MLS expansion side New York City FC in exchange for New York City FC's highest third round pick of the 2016 MLS SuperDraft	

=== Loan in ===
Date	Player	Pos	Previous club	Fee/notes	Ref
February 14, 2014	(Colombia) Andrés Escobar	FW	(Ukraine) Dynamo Kyiv	On loan from Ukrainian club Dynamo Kyiv for the 2014 season	
July 21, 2014	(Mexico) Richard Sánchez	GK	(Mexico) Tigres UANL	Temporary loan from Mexican club Tigres UANL due to injury of GK Chris Seitz. Returned to Tigres on September 12, 2014	
August 7, 2014	(Paraguay) Walter Cabrera	DF	(Paraguay) General Díaz FC	On loan from Paraguayan club General Díaz FC for the remainder of the 2014 season	

=== Loan out ===
Date	Player	Pos	Destination club	Fee/notes	Ref
April 2, 2014	(United States) Brian Span	MF	(United States) Orlando City SC	On loan to USL Pro side Orlando City SC for the 2014 season	
April 8, 2014	(United States) Jonathan Top (HGP)	FW	(United States) Arizona United SC	On loan to USL Pro side Arizona United SC for the 2014 season	
August 6, 2014	(Trinidad and Tobago) Nick Walker	DF	(Puerto Rico) Bayamón F.C.	On loan to Puerto Rican club Bayamón F.C. for the remainder of the 2014 season	

=== Roster ===
As of September 18, 2014. Note: Flags indicate national team as defined under FIFA eligibility rules; some limited exceptions apply. Players may hold more than one non-FIFA nationality.

No.	Pos.	Nation	Player
1	GK	PER	Raúl Fernández
3	DF	USA	Moises Hernandez (HGP)
5	DF	COL	Jair Benítez
6	MF	SCO	Adam Moffat
7	FW	PAN	Blas Pérez
8	MF	FRA	Peter Luccin
9	FW	URU	David Texeira (DP)
10	MF	ARG	Mauro Díaz (DP)
11	FW	COL	Fabián Castillo
12	MF	USA	Ryan Hollingshead
13	FW	CAN	Tesho Akindele
14	DF	USA	George John
15	MF	USA	Brian Span
16	MF	USA	Coy Craft (HGP)
17	DF	USA	Zach Loyd

No.	Pos.	Nation	Player
18	GK	USA	Chris Seitz
20	MF	HON	Hendry Thomas
21	DF	PAR	Walter Cabrera (on loan from General Díaz FC)
22	DF	USA	Stephen Keel
23	MF	USA	Kellyn Acosta (HGP)
24	DF	USA	Matt Hedges
25	DF	USA	Walker Zimmerman (GA)
26	MF	USA	Danny Garcia (HGP)
27	MF	JAM	Je-Vaughn Watson
28	MF	USA	Victor Ulloa (HGP)
31	DF	BRA	Michel
32	FW	USA	Jonathan Top (HGP)
44	GK	MEX	Jesse Gonzalez (HGP)
91	FW	COL	Andrés Escobar (on loan from Dynamo Kyiv; DP)

== Competitions ==
=== Match results ===
Win Draw Loss Canceled

=== Preseason ===
February 07, 2014 International Friendly	BK Häcken	0 - 3	FC Dallas	Abu Dhabi, United Arab Emirates
		Report	Castillo 5'; Perez 19'; Hollingshead 84'

February 10, 2014 International Friendly	BK Häcken	3 - 1	FC Dallas	Abu Dhabi, United Arab Emirates

February 19, 2014	South Florida Bulls	1 - 5	FC Dallas	Bradenton, Florida
3:00PM CDT	Moalosi 51'	Report	Pérez 42' 44' (pen.) 77'; Hernandez (yellow card) 56'; Hedges 63'; Hollingshead 89'	Stadium: IMG Academy; Attendance: 520; Referee: Ted Unkel

February 22, 2014	FC Dallas	6 - 1	Fort Lauderdale Strikers	Bradenton, Florida
6:00PM CDT	Hernandez (yellow card) 9'; Pérez 17', 44'; Castillo 19'; Acosta 31'; Watson 57'; Michel 78' (pen.)	Report	Hassan 8', (yellow card) 10'; Chin (yellow card) 39'	Stadium: IMG Academy; Referee: Andrew Pfeffercorn

March 1, 2014 deeproots Funds Cup	San Antonio Scorpions	1 - 1	FC Dallas	San Antonio, Texas
7:30PM CDT	Janicki 90+'	Report	Jacobson (yellow card) 15'; Acosta 47'	Stadium: Toyota Field; Attendance: 7,967

=== Mid-season friendlies ===
July 23, 2014 International friendly	FC Dallas	0 - 2	Aston Villa	Frisco, Texas
8:00PM CDT	Walker (yellow card) 47'	Report	Weimann 44'; N'Zogbia 48'; Delph (yellow card) 62'	Stadium: Toyota Stadium; Referee: Christopher Mercado

=== Major League Soccer ===
==== Overall standings ====
Pos	Team	Pld	W	L	T	GF	GA	GD	Pts	Qualification
1	Seattle Sounders FC (S)	34	20	10	4	65	50	+15	64	CONCACAF Champions League
2	LA Galaxy (C)	34	17	7	10	69	37	+32	61	CONCACAF Champions League
3	D.C. United	34	17	9	8	52	37	+15	59	CONCACAF Champions League
4	Real Salt Lake	34	15	8	11	54	39	+15	56	CONCACAF Champions League
5	New England Revolution	34	17	13	4	51	46	+5	55	
6	FC Dallas	34	16	12	6	55	45	+10	54	
7	Columbus Crew	34	14	10	10	52	42	+10	52	
8	New York Red Bulls	34	13	10	11	55	50	+5	50	
9	Vancouver Whitecaps FC	34	12	8	14	42	40	+2	50	CONCACAF Champions League
10	Sporting Kansas City	34	14	13	7	48	41	+7	49	
11	Portland Timbers	34	12	9	13	61	52	+9	49	
12	Philadelphia Union	34	10	12	12	51	51	0	42	
13	Toronto FC	34	11	15	8	44	54	−10	41	
14	Houston Dynamo	34	11	17	6	39	58	−19	39	
15	Chicago Fire	34	6	10	18	41	51	−10	36	
16	Chivas USA	34	9	19	6	29	61	−32	33	
17	Colorado Rapids	34	8	18	8	43	62	−19	32	
18	San Jose Earthquakes	34	6	16	12	35	50	−15	30	
19	Montreal Impact	34	6	18	10	38	58	−20	28	

Source: MLS
Rules for classification: 1) points; 2) head-to-head record; 3) goal difference; 4) number of goals scored
(C) MLS Cup Champion; (S) Supporters' Shield

==== Western Conference standings ====
Western Conference

Pos	Team	Pld	W	L	T	GF	GA	GD	Pts	Qualification
1	Seattle Sounders FC	34	20	10	4	65	50	+15	64	MLS Cup Conference Semifinals
2	LA Galaxy	34	17	7	10	69	37	+32	61	MLS Cup Conference Semifinals
3	Real Salt Lake	34	15	8	11	54	39	+15	56	MLS Cup Conference Semifinals
4	FC Dallas	34	16	12	6	55	45	+10	54	MLS Cup Knockout round
5	Vancouver Whitecaps FC	34	12	8	14	42	40	+2	50	MLS Cup Knockout round
6	Portland Timbers	34	12	9	13	61	52	+9	49	
7	Chivas USA	34	9	19	6	29	61	−32	33	
8	Colorado Rapids	34	8	18	8	43	62	−19	32	
9	San Jose Earthquakes	34	6	16	12	35	50	−15	30	

Source: MLS

==== Results summary ====
Overall								Home						Away					
Pld	W	D	L	GF	GA	GD	Pts	W	D	L	GF	GA	GD	W	D	L	GF	GA	GD
34	16	6	12	55	45	+10	54	12	1	4	33	22	+11	4	5	8	22	23	−1

Last updated: October 25, 2014.
Source: Regular Season

==== Results by round ====
Round	1	2	3	4	5	6	7	8	9	10	11	12	13	14	15	16	17	18	19	20	21	22	23	24	25	26	27	28	29	30	31	32	33	34
Stadium	H	A	H	H	A	H	H	A	H	A	A	H	A	A	H	H	A	A	H	H	A	A	H	A	H	A	A	H	A	H	A	H	A	H
Result	W	D	W	W	W	L	W	L	L	L	L	D	L	D	L	W	D	D	W	W	D	W	W	W	W	L	L	W	L	W	L	W	W	L

Updated to match(es) played on October 25, 2014. Source: Regular Season
A = Away; H = Home; W = Win; D = Draw; L = Loss

==== Regular season ====
Kickoff times are in CDT (UTC-05) unless shown otherwise

March 8, 2014 1	FC Dallas	3–2	Montreal Impact	Frisco, Texas
7:30PM CST (UTC-06)	Castillo 16'; Hernandez (yellow card) 19'; Pérez 24' (pen.); Díaz 47' (yellow card) 50'	Report	Nyassi 10' (yellow card) 60'; Ferrari (yellow card) 17'; Wenger 65'	Stadium: Toyota Stadium; Attendance: 18,011; Referee: Jorge Luna Hernandez

March 15, 2014 2	Sporting Kansas City	1–1	FC Dallas	Kansas City, Kansas
7:30PM CDT (UTC-05)	Collin 81'	Report	Moffat (yellow card) 28'; Keel (yellow card) 30'; Watson (yellow card) 88'; Hedges 90'	Stadium: Sporting Park; Attendance: 19,431; Referee: Abbey Okulaja

March 22, 2014 3	FC Dallas	3–1	Chivas USA	Frisco, Texas
7:30PM CDT (UTC-05)	Jacobson (yellow card) 38'; Castillo 71'; Watson 78'; Michel (yellow card) 84' (goal) 86'; Thomas (red card) 90+4'	Report	Lochhead (yellow card) 33'; Torres (yellow card) 34' (goal) 81'; Minda (yellow card) 42'; McNamara (yellow card) 66'; Delgado (yellow card) 85'; Tyrpak (yellow card) 87'	Stadium: Toyota Stadium; Attendance: 15,564; Referee: Fotis Bazakos

March 29, 2014 4	FC Dallas	2–1	Portland Timbers	Frisco, Texas
7:30PM CDT (UTC-05)	Castillo (yellow card) 10'; Pérez (yellow card) 17' (goal) 45+3'; Watson (red card) 40'; Díaz 84'; Acosta (yellow card) 88'	Report	Paparatto (yellow card) 3'; Harrington (red card) 39'; Hedges 66' (o.g.); Alhassan (yellow card) 67'; Kah (yellow card) 90+3'	Stadium: Toyota Stadium; Attendance: 16,045; Referee: Sorin Stoica

April 5, 2014 5 Texas Derby	Houston Dynamo	1–4	FC Dallas	Houston, Texas
7:00PM CDT (UTC-05)	Taylor (yellow card) 21'; Clark 41'; Horst (red card) 60'	Report	Michel 31' (pen.); Thomas (yellow card) 37'; Watson 61' 70'; Barnes 68' (o.g.)	Stadium: BBVA Compass Stadium; Attendance: 22,202; Referee: Ricardo Salazar

April 12, 2014 6	FC Dallas	2–3	Seattle Sounders FC	Frisco, Texas
7:30PM CDT (UTC-05)	Texeira 10' (yellow card) 45+2'; Watson (yellow card) 20'; Michel 42' (pen.); Thomas (yellow card) 46'; Castillo (yellow card) 60'	Report	Neagle (yellow card) 12'; Alonso (yellow card) 18'; Dempsey 22' 85'; Yedlin (yellow card) 40'; Keel 75' (o.g.); Barrett (yellow card) 90+4'	Stadium: Toyota Stadium; Attendance: 17,070; Referee: Juan Guzman

April 19, 2014 7	FC Dallas	2–1	Toronto FC	Frisco, Texas
7:30PM CDT (UTC-05)	Hedges 37'; Pérez 88'	Report	Issey 21' (yellow card) 55'; Jackson (yellow card) 74'	Stadium: Toyota Stadium; Attendance: 17,406; Referee: Jorge González

April 26, 2014 8	D.C. United	4–1	FC Dallas	Washington D.C.
6:00PM CDT (UTC-05)	Espindola 45+4' 69'; Boswell 60'; Franklin 64'	Report	Díaz 13'; Loyd (yellow card) 10' (yellow-red card) 39'; Seitz (yellow card) 48'; Hedges (yellow card) 74'; Michel (red card) 89'	Stadium: RFK Stadium; Attendance: 11,172; Referee: Fotis Bazakos

May 4, 2014 9	FC Dallas	0–1	New York Red Bulls	Frisco, Texas
2:00PM CDT (UTC-05)	Watson (red card) 10'; Castillo (yellow card) 26'; Ulloa (yellow card) 90+4'	Report	Henry (yellow card) 21'; Sam (yellow card) 65'; Wright-Phillips 71'	Stadium: Toyota Stadium; Attendance: 17,105; Referee: Edvin Jurisevic

May 7, 2014 10	Seattle Sounders FC	2–1	FC Dallas	Seattle, Washington
9:00PM CDT (UTC-05)	Evans (yellow card) 37'; Pappa (yellow card) 42'; Neagle 62'; Cooper 88'	Report	Michel 16' (pen.) (yellow card) 17'; Hedges (yellow card) 23'; Pérez (yellow card) 48'	Stadium: CenturyLink Field; Attendance: 38,489; Referee: Baldomero Toledo

May 10, 2014 11	San Jose Earthquakes	2–1	FC Dallas	Santa Clara, California
9:30PM CDT (UTC-05)	Stewart (yellow card) 14'; Cato 25' (yellow card) 67'; Cronin (yellow card) 29'; Salinas (red card) 45'; Texeira 73' (o.g.); Fucito (yellow card) 81'	Report	Michel (yellow card) 72' (goal) 76'	Stadium: Buck Shaw Stadium; Attendance: 10,525; Referee: Chris Penso

May 17, 2014 12	FC Dallas	1–1	Chivas USA	Frisco, Texas
7:30PM CDT (UTC-05)	Ulloa (yellow card) 76'; Castillo 83'	Report	Delgado (yellow card) 43' (goal) 60'; Minda (yellow card) 88'; Kennedy (yellow card) 90+3'	Stadium: Toyota Stadium; Attendance: 15,039; Referee: Drew Fisher

May 21, 2014 13	LA Galaxy	2–1	FC Dallas	Carson, California
9:30PM CDT (UTC-05)	Keane 24'; Opare (yellow card) 37'; Zardes 44'	Report	Akindele (yellow card) 43' (goal) 65'; Watson (yellow card) 71'	Stadium: StubHub Center; Attendance: 14,615; Referee: Allen Chapman

May 24, 2014 14	Real Salt Lake	0–0	FC Dallas	Sandy, Utah
8:30PM CDT (UTC-05)	Beltran (yellow card) 61'; Morales (yellow card) 85'	Report	Ulloa (yellow card) 67'; Hedges (yellow card) 80'; Castillo (yellow card) 83'	Stadium: Rio Tinto Stadium; Attendance: 20,488; Referee: Hilario Grajeda

May 31, 2014 15	FC Dallas	1–2	San Jose Earthquakes	Frisco, Texas
7:30PM CDT (UTC-05)	Pérez 16'; Moffat (yellow card) 25' (yellow-red card) 37'	Report	Harris 27'; Pierazzi 45'; Barklage (yellow card) 87'; Cato (yellow card) 89'	Stadium: Toyota Stadium; Attendance: 15,682; Referee: Jose Carlos Rivero

June 7, 2014 16	FC Dallas	3–2	Colorado Rapids	Frisco, Texas
7:30PM CDT (UTC-05)	Escobar 33'; Loyd 45+2'; Luccin (yellow card) 49'; Castillo 62'	Report	Serna (yellow card) 18'; Brown 25'; Mari 52'; LaBrocca (yellow card) 76'	Stadium: Toyota Stadium; Attendance: 16,209; Referee: Kevin Stott

June 11, 2014 17	Portland Timbers	2–2	FC Dallas	Portland, Oregon
9:00PM CDT (UTC-05)	Adi (yellow card) 54'; Johnson 79' (pen.); Kah 90+4'	Report	Castillo 27'; Pérez 39' (yellow card) 90' (yellow-red card) 90+2'; Keel (yellow card) 60'; Fernández (yellow card) 77'; Hernandez (red card) 87'	Stadium: Providence Park; Attendance: 20,814; Referee: Alan Kelly

June 29, 2014 18	Columbus Crew	0–0	FC Dallas	Columbus, Ohio
1:00PM CDT (UTC-05)		Report		Stadium: Crew Stadium; Attendance: 20,617; Referee: Jair Marrufo

July 4, 2014 19	FC Dallas	2–1	Philadelphia Union	Frisco, Texas
8:00PM CDT (UTC-05)	Akindele 26'; Williams 49' (o.g.)	Report	Okugo 43'; Casey (yellow card) 65'; Le Toux (yellow card) 68'; Edu (red card) 89'	Stadium: Toyota Stadium; Attendance: 21,182; Referee: Edvin Jurisevic

July 19, 2014 20	FC Dallas	2–0	New England Revolution	Frisco, Texas
8:00PM CDT (UTC-05)	Escobar 29'; Akindele 90+1'	Report	Tierney (yellow card) 79'	Stadium: Toyota Stadium; Attendance: 15,551; Referee: Armando Villarreal

July 27, 2014 21	Vancouver Whitecaps FC	2–2	FC Dallas	Vancouver, British Columbia
4:00PM CDT (UTC-05)	Mattocks 11' (yellow card) 59'; Morales 53' (pen.)	Report	Pérez 29'; Michel 39' (pen.)	Stadium: BC Place; Attendance: 21,000; Referee: Kevin Stott

August 3, 2014 22	Chivas USA	0–1	FC Dallas	Carson, California
9:00PM CDT (UTC-05)		Report	Hedges (yellow card) 16'; Akindele 49'; Díaz (yellow card) 67'	Stadium: StubHub Center; Attendance: 3,951; Referee: Chris Penso

August 9, 2014 23	FC Dallas	3–1	Colorado Rapids	Frisco, Texas
8:00PM CDT (UTC-05)	Hedges 9'; Michel 11' (pen.) (yellow card) 87'; Castillo 55'; Moffat (yellow card) 70'; Akindele (yellow card) 74'	Report	LaBrocca (yellow card) 43'; Buddle (yellow card) 70'; Mari (yellow card) 73'; Torres 86' (pen.)	Stadium: Toyota Stadium; Attendance: 15,731; Referee: José Rivero

August 16, 2014 24	San Jose Earthquakes	0–5	FC Dallas	Santa Clara, California
9:30PM CDT (UTC-05)	Bernárdez (yellow card) 44'	Report	Castillo 30' 74'; Akindele 43' 58' 86'	Stadium: Buck Shaw Stadium; Attendance: 10,525; Referee: Jair Marrufo

August 22, 2014 25	FC Dallas	2–1	Real Salt Lake	Frisco, Texas
8:00PM CDT (UTC-05)	Pérez (yellow card) 31' (yellow-red card) 45'; Michel (yellow card) 33'; Watson 50'; Castillo 74'	Report	Schuler (yellow card) 45'; García 90+1'	Stadium: Toyota Stadium; Attendance: 17,622; Referee: Ismail Elfath

August 30, 2014 26 Brimstone Cup	Chicago Fire	1–0	FC Dallas	Bridgeview, Illinois
7:30PM CDT (UTC-05)	Ward (yellow card) 10'; Soumaré (yellow card) 52'; Earnshaw 83'; Watson (yellow card) 90+5'	Report		Stadium: Toyota Park; Attendance: 16,824; Referee: Marcos de Oliveira

September 6, 2014 27	Real Salt Lake	2–1	FC Dallas	Sandy, Utah
9:00PM CDT (UTC-05)	Findley 31'; Saborio 77'; Beltran (yellow card) 85'	Report	Loyd (yellow card) 54'; Michel 67'	Stadium: Rio Tinto Stadium; Attendance: 20,545; Referee: Armando Villarreal

September 13, 2014 28	FC Dallas	2–1	Vancouver Whitecaps FC	Frisco, Texas
7:30PM CDT (UTC-05)	Pérez 20' 78'	Report	Watson (yellow card) 29'; Teibert (yellow card) 45+2'; Hurtado 67'; Harvey (yellow card) 89'	Stadium: Toyota Stadium; Attendance: 16,792; Referee: Ted Unkel

September 20, 2014 29	LA Galaxy	2–1	FC Dallas	Carson, California
9:30PM CDT (UTC-05)	Keane 62'; Gonzalez (yellow card) 69'; Sarvas (yellow card) 74'; Gordon 84'; Donovan (yellow card) 90'	Report	Acosta (yellow card) 23'; Ulloa (yellow card) 35'; Hernandez (yellow card) 42'; Pérez 54'	Stadium: StubHub Center; Attendance: 22,863; Referee: Kevin Stott

September 24, 2014 30	FC Dallas	3–1	Seattle Sounders FC	Frisco, Texas
8:00PM CDT (UTC-05)	Texeira 8' 78' (yellow card) 79'; Michel (yellow card) 44'; Pérez 88'	Report	Neagle 58'	Stadium: Toyota Stadium; Attendance: 14,601; Referee: Mark Geiger

October 4, 2014 31	Vancouver Whitecaps FC	2–0	FC Dallas	Vancouver, British Columbia
6:00PM CDT (UTC-05)	Fernandez 14' 18' (yellow card) 90+4'; Watson (yellow card) 78'	Report	Watson (yellow card) 60'	Stadium: BC Place; Attendance: 20,183; Referee: Ricardo Salazar

October 12, 2014 32	FC Dallas	2–1	LA Galaxy	Frisco, Texas
6:00PM CDT (UTC-05)	Texeira 52'; Castillo 87'; Hernandez (red card) 89'	Report	DeLaGarza (yellow card) 17'; Ishizaki 22'; Riley (yellow card) 44'	Stadium: Toyota Stadium; Attendance: 19,039; Referee: Alan Kelly

October 18, 2014 33	Colorado Rapids	0–1	FC Dallas	Commerce City, Colorado
2:00PM CDT (UTC-05)	Watts (yellow card) 56' (yellow-red card) 79'; Knight (yellow card) 65'	Report	Benitez (yellow card) 41'; Pérez 56' (pen.); Moffat (yellow card) 73'	Stadium: Dick's Sporting Goods Park; Attendance: 15,274; Referee: Hilario Grajeda

October 25, 2014 34	FC Dallas	0–2	Portland Timbers	Frisco, Texas
7:30PM CDT (UTC-05)	Castillo (yellow card) 63'; Texeira (yellow card) 68'	Report	Nagbe 43'; Fernández (yellow card) 61'; Urruti 82'	Stadium: Toyota Stadium; Attendance: 17,231; Referee: Jair Marrufo

==== MLS Cup Playoffs ====
===== Western Conference Wild Card Game =====
October 29, 2014 Wild Card Game	Vancouver Whitecaps FC	1–2	FC Dallas	Frisco, Texas
8:00PM CDT (UTC-05)	Koffie (yellow card) 14'; Morales (yellow card) 45'; Waston (yellow card) 57'; Hurtado 64'; Fernandez (yellow card) 85' (yellow-red card) 90+6'	Report	Watson (yellow card) 35'; Akindele 40'; Michel 84' (pen.); Díaz (yellow card) 85'; Escobar (yellow card) 85'	Stadium: Toyota Stadium; Attendance: 10,279; Referee: Mark Geiger

===== Western Conference semifinals =====
November 2, 2014 Game 1	Seattle Sounders FC	1–1	FC Dallas	Frisco, Texas
8:00PM CST (UTC-06)	Alonso 54'; González (yellow card) 74'	Report	Michel 34' (pen.)	Stadium: Toyota Stadium; Attendance: 16,112; Referee: Allen Chapman

November 10, 2014 Game 2	FC Dallas	0–0 (1-1^{1} agg.)	Seattle Sounders FC	Seattle, Washington
9:30PM CST (UTC-06)	Hernandez (yellow card) 14'	Report		Stadium: CenturyLink Field; Attendance: 38,912; Referee: Baldomero Toledo

1. FC Dallas eliminated on away goals

==== Reserve League ====
Kickoff times are in CDT (UTC-05) unless shown otherwise

March 9, 2014 1	FC Dallas Reserves	2–0	Montreal Impact Reserves	Frisco, Texas
10:30AM CST (UTC-06)	Escobar 45'; Keel 52'	Report	Romero (yellow card) 10'; Ouimette (yellow card) 51'	Stadium: AdvoCare Field 1

March 23, 2014 2	FC Dallas Reserves	2–0	Chivas USA Reserves	Frisco, Texas
10:30AM CDT (UTC-07)	Garcia (yellow card) 38'; Akindele 39' 73'	Report		Stadium: AdvoCare Field 1

April 15, 2014 3	FC Dallas Reserves	1–0	Oklahoma City Energy	Frisco, Texas
7:00PM CDT (UTC-05)	Hollingshead (yellow card) 50'; Jacobson 53'; Reeves (yellow card) 88'; Hernandez (red card) 90'	Report	Greig (yellow card) 22'; Shiffman (yellow card) 42'	Stadium: Toyota Stadium; Attendance: 341; Referee: Pedro Trejo Jr.

April 22, 2014 4	FC Dallas Reserves	2–3	Orlando City SC	Frisco, Texas
7:00PM CDT (UTC-05)	De La Tejera 62'; Meyer (yellow card) 73'; Zimmerman 90'	Report	Mbengue 17'; Molino 47' 64'; Boden (yellow card) 83'	Stadium: Toyota Stadium; Attendance: 375; Referee: Chris Mercado

July 11, 2014 5	Rochester Rhinos	3–0	FC Dallas Reserves	Rochester, New York
6:35PM CDT (UTC-05)	Banks 21'; Rolfe 31'; Sundly (yellow card) 65' (goal) 88'; Rozeboom (yellow card) 78'	Report	Hollingshead (yellow card) 30'; Garcia (yellow card) 48'	Stadium: Sahlen's Stadium

August 24, 2014 6	Pittsburgh Riverhounds	3–1	FC Dallas Reserves	Pittsburgh, Pennsylvania
2:00PM CDT (UTC-05)	Vincent 20'; Kerr 33'; Green 51'	Report	Span 42'	Stadium: Highmark Stadium

August 31, 2014 7	Chicago Fire Reserves	2–1	FC Dallas Reserves	Bridgeview, Illinois
10:00AM CDT (UTC-05)	Ianni (yellow card) 21'; Fondy 32'; Cochrane (yellow card) 86'; Pongolle 90+' (pen.)	Report	Top 63'	Stadium: Toyota Park Practice Field

September 15, 2014 8	FC Dallas Reserves	0–2	Chicago Fire Reserves	Frisco, Texas
10:00AM CDT (UTC-05)	Moffat (red card) 57'; Luccin (yellow card) 70'	Report	Fondy 14' 36'; Joya (yellow card) 54'	Stadium: AdvoCare Field 1 Referee: William Tomlinson

September 28, 2014 9	Colorado Rapids Reserves	Canceled	FC Dallas Reserves	Commerce City, Colorado
11:00AM CDT (UTC-05)				Stadium: Dick's Sporting Goods Park Field 20

=== U.S. Open Cup ===
June 17, 2014 Fourth Round	FC Dallas (Texas)	2–0	(Texas) San Antonio Scorpions	Frisco, Texas
8:00 PM CDT (UTC-05)	Castillo 74'; Escobar (yellow card) 57' (goal) 81'	Report	Hassli (yellow card) 69'	Stadium: Toyota Stadium; Attendance: 2,296; Referee: Ted Unkel

June 24, 2014 Fifth Round	Houston Dynamo (Texas)	2–3 (OT)	(Texas) FC Dallas	Houston, Texas
8:00 PM CDT (UTC-05)	Barnes 43' (pen.); Cummings 62'; Taylor (yellow card) 102'	Report	Castillo 35'; Escobar 60'; Akindele 99'	Stadium: BBVA Compass Stadium; Attendance: 2,083; Referee: Kevin Stott

July 9, 2014 Quarterfinals	Carolina RailHawks (North Carolina)	2–5	(Texas) FC Dallas	Cary, North Carolina
6:30 PM CDT (UTC-05)	Schilawski 9'; King (yellow card) 15'; Martínez 37' (pen.); Low (yellow card) 61'	Report	Pérez 23', 34', 90'; Castillo 44'; Jacobson (yellow card) 76'; Díaz 89'	Stadium: WakeMed Soccer Park; Attendance: 4,169; Referee: Ricardo Salazar

August 12, 2014 Semifinals	FC Dallas (Texas)	1–1 (SO) (3–4 p)	(Pennsylvania) Philadelphia Union	Frisco, Texas
8:00 PM CDT (UTC-05)	Castillo 81'	Report	Okugo 47'; White (yellow card) 75'; Lahoud (yellow card) 102'; Cruz (yellow card) 114'	Stadium: Toyota Stadium; Attendance: 4,326; Referee: Mark Geiger
	Penalties
	Michel (penalty scored); Akindele (penalty scored); Pérez (penalty missed); Loyd (penalty scored); Ulloa (penalty missed)		(penalty scored) Williams; (penalty scored) Nogueira; (penalty scored) Maidana; (penalty scored) Edu

== Statistics ==
=== Appearances ===
Numbers outside parentheses denote appearances as starter.
Numbers in parentheses denote appearances as substitute.
Players with no appearances are not included in the list.

As of final match played November 10, 2014

No.	Pos.	Nat.	Name	MLS	U.S. Open Cup	Total
No.	Pos.	Nat.	Name	Apps	Apps	Apps
1	GK	PER	Raúl Fernández	21(1)	2	23(1)
3	DF	USA	Moises Hernandez	15(4)	3	18(4)
4	MF	USA	Andrew Jacobson	5(8)	(3)	5(11)
5	DF	COL	Jair Benítez	19(7)	(2)	19(9)
6	MF	SCO	Adam Moffat	13(7)	3	16(7)
7	FW	PAN	Blas Pérez	27(5)	4	31(5)
8	MF	FRA	Peter Luccin	2(9)	(1)	2(10)
9	FW	URU	David Texeira	9(12)	(1)	9(13)
10	MF	ARG	Mauro Díaz	11(8)	1(1)	12(9)
11	FW	COL	Fabián Castillo	29(1)	4	33(1)
12	MF	USA	Ryan Hollingshead	4(8)	(1)	4(9)
13	FW	CAN	Tesho Akindele	21(8)	4	25(8)
16	FW	USA	Coy Craft	(1)	0	(1)
17	DF	USA	Zach Loyd	31(1)	4	35(1)
18	GK	USA	Chris Seitz	16	2	18
20	MF	HND	Hendry Thomas	9(1)	1	10(1)
22	DF	USA	Stephen Keel	14(2)	2(2)	16(4)
23	MF	USA	Kellyn Acosta	9(7)	0	9(7)
24	DF	USA	Matt Hedges	35	2	37
25	DF	USA	Walker Zimmerman	10(2)	1	11(2)
26	MF	USA	Danny Garcia	4	0	4
27	MF	JAM	Je-Vaughn Watson	32(2)	3(1)	35(3)
28	MF	USA	Victor Ulloa	29(2)	4	33(2)
31	FW	BRA	Michel	23(5)	1	24(5)
34	DF	TRI	Nick Walker	(1)	0	(1)
91	FW	COL	Andrés Escobar	19(7)	3	22(7)

=== Goals and assists ===
As of final match played November 10, 2014

No.	Pos.	Name	MLS		U.S. Open Cup		Total	
No.	Pos.	Name	Goals	Assists	Goals	Assists	Goals	Assists
4	MF	(United States) Andrew Jacobson	0	0	0	1	0	1
5	DF	(Colombia) Jair Benítez	0	4	0	0	0	4
7	FW	(Panama) Blas Pérez	11	6	3	1	14	7
9	FW	(Uruguay) David Texeira	4	0	0	1	4	1
10	MF	(Argentina) Mauro Díaz	3	4	1	0	4	4
11	FW	(Colombia) Fabián Castillo	10	4	4	3	14	7
13	FW	(Canada) Tesho Akindele	8	3	1	1	9	4
17	DF	(United States) Zach Loyd	1	0	0	0	1	0
20	MF	(Honduras) Hendry Thomas	0	1	0	0	0	1
22	DF	(United States) Stephen Keel	0	1	0	0	0	1
23	MF	(United States) Kellyn Acosta	0	1	0	0	0	1
24	DF	(United States) Matt Hedges	3	1	0	0	3	1
27	MF	(Jamaica) Je-Vaughn Watson	4	2	0	2	4	4
28	MF	(United States) Victor Ulloa	0	1	0	0	0	1
31	FW	(Brazil) Michel	10	5	0	0	10	5
91	FW	(Colombia) Andrés Escobar	2	4	2	1	4	5
			2	0	0	0	2	0
Total			58	36	11	10	69	46

=== Disciplinary record ===
As of final match played November 10, 2014

No.	Pos.	Name	MLS		U.S. Open Cup		Total	
No.	Pos.	Name	Booked	Sent off (straight red)	Booked	Sent off (straight red)	Booked	Sent off (straight red)
1	GK	(Peru) Raúl Fernández	1	0	0	0	1	0
3	DF	(United States) Moises Hernandez	3	2	0	0	3	2
4	MF	(United States) Andrew Jacobson	1	0	1	0	2	0
5	DF	(Colombia) Jair Benitez	1	0	0	0	1	0
6	MF	(Scotland) Adam Moffat	4	1	0	0	4	1
7	FW	(Panama) Blas Pérez	4	2	0	0	4	2
8	MF	(France) Peter Luccin	1	0	0	0	1	0
9	FW	(Uruguay) David Texeira	2	0	0	0	2	0
10	MF	(Argentina) Mauro Díaz	3	0	0	0	3	0
11	FW	(Colombia) Fabián Castillo	5	0	0	0	5	0
13	FW	(Canada) Tesho Akindele	2	0	0	0	2	0
17	DF	(United States) Zach Loyd	2	1	0	0	2	1
18	GK	(United States) Chris Seitz	1	0	0	0	1	0
20	MF	(Honduras) Hendry Thomas	2	1	0	0	2	1
22	DF	(United States) Stephen Keel	2	0	0	0	2	0
23	MF	(United States) Kellyn Acosta	2	0	0	0	2	0
24	DF	(United States) Matt Hedges	4	0	0	0	4	0
27	MF	(Jamaica) Je-Vaughn Watson	5	2	0	0	5	2
28	MF	(United States) Victor Ulloa	4	0	0	0	4	0
31	FW	(Brazil) Michel	5	1	0	0	5	1
91	FW	(Colombia) Andrés Escobar	1	0	1	0	2	0
Total			56	10	2	0	58	10

== See also ==
- FC Dallas
- 2014 in American soccer
- 2014 Major League Soccer season
