= Kellyn Acosta =

American soccer player (born 1995)

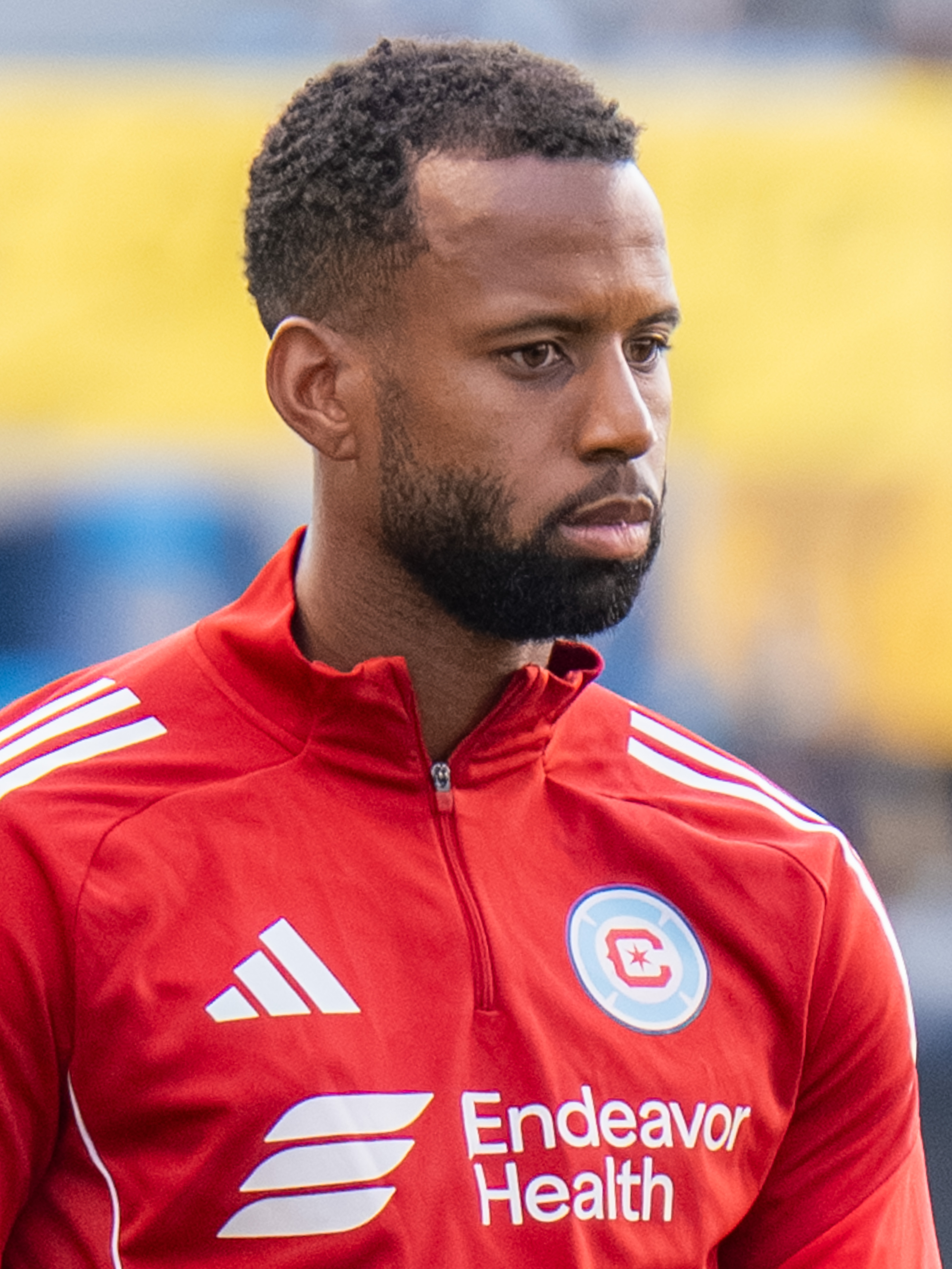
- Acosta with the Chicago Fire in 2025

Personal information
- Full name: Kellyn Kai Perry-Acosta
- Date of birth: July 24, 1995 (age 31)
- Place of birth: Plano, Texas, U.S.
- Height: 5 ft 10 in (1.77 m)
- Position: Midfielder

Team information
- Current team: Pogoń Szczecin
- Number: 3

Youth career
- 2009–2013: FC Dallas

Senior career*
Years	Team	Apps	(Gls)
2013–2018	FC Dallas	117	(9)
2018–2021	Colorado Rapids	79	(7)
2022–2023	Los Angeles FC	56	(2)
2024–2026	Chicago Fire	53	(3)
2026–	Pogoń Szczecin	14	(2)
2026–	Pogoń Szczecin II	1	(0)

International career
2010–2011	United States U17	18	(0)
2012	United States U18	4	(0)
2013–2015	United States U20	15	(0)
2016	United States U23	2	(0)
2016–2023	United States	58	(2)
Medal record
Representing United States
Men's soccer
CONCACAF Gold Cup
Winner	2017 United States
Winner	2021 United States
CONCACAF Nations League
Winner	2021 United States
- * Club domestic league appearances and goals as of August 10, 2026

Kellyn Kai Perry-Acosta (born July 24, 1995) is an American professional soccer player who plays as a midfielder for Ekstraklasa club Pogoń Szczecin.

== Early life ==
Acosta was raised in Plano, Texas. His father is Japanese American while his mother is African American. Acosta's paternal grandmother is Japanese, and the surname Acosta comes from his Mexican paternal step-grandfather. Plano was an overwhelmingly white city when he was growing up. In his predominantly white neighborhood, Acosta said in 2022 that he had long tried to hide any evidence of his Japanese roots in order to blend in and avoid bullying or any confused stares at his multiethnic family. "I wanted to fit in so bad there were times my Asian grandma would have to pick me up and park around the corner," he told NBC News. "It was so puzzling for some and I kind of got made fun of for it."

== Club career ==
=== FC Dallas ===
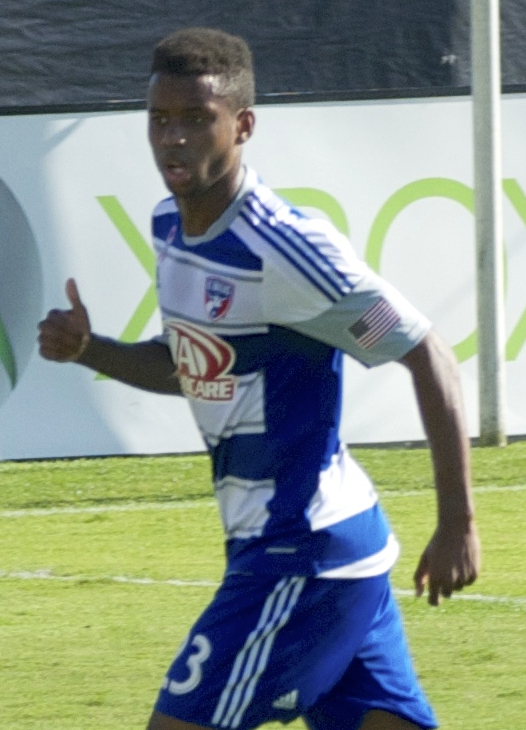
Acosta with FC Dallas in 2013.

Acosta played for the FC Dallas Development Academy and was committed to play soccer at the University of Maryland prior to becoming a homegrown signing in July 2012 (although he was not eligible for selection until the 2013 season). He did make three MLS Reserve League appearances. He was named U.S. Soccer Development Academy Central Conference Player of the Year in 2011–12.

Acosta made his first-team debut in a 3–0 loss at Seattle in August 2013. He made nine consecutive starts from August to October of that season. His 2014 season was interrupted by a knee injury. He initially played fullback for the club, but eventually transitioned to a starting role as a defensive midfielder in 2015.

=== Colorado Rapids ===
On July 23, 2018, Acosta was traded to the Colorado Rapids in exchange for Dominique Badji. Acosta started all 12 league matches after joining Colorado, scoring two goals and adding three assists in Burgundy. On February 20, 2019, Acosta signed a three-year contract extension keeping him in Colorado through 2021, with club options for 2022 and 2023.

Acosta enjoyed similar success in 2019, making 30 MLS starts and playing 2,619 minutes, both career highs, while adding two goals and two assists.

In a pandemic-shortened 2020 campaign, Acosta scored two goals and added one assist as he made 14 starts among 15 league appearances. Acosta scored Colorado's playoff-clinching goal in a 1–0 win at Portland Timbers on November 4. Acosta started and played 81 minutes in Colorado's MLS Cup Playoff first-round loss to Minnesota United FC.

=== Los Angeles FC ===
On January 14, 2022, Acosta was acquired by Los Angeles FC from the Colorado Rapids in exchange for $1.1 million in General Allocation Money ($550k GAM in 2022 and $550k GAM in 2023). The Rapids would retain a portion of any sale should Acosta be sold elsewhere. Additionally, if certain performance based metrics are met, Colorado will receive an additional $400k GAM.

=== Chicago Fire ===
On February 13, 2024, Acosta signed as a free agent on a three-year deal with Chicago Fire. On March 16, 2024, Acosta scored a last minute game-winning goal from the halfway line against CF Montréal in a 4–3 victory.

On January 14, 2026, Chicago Fire FC and Kellyn Acosta has mutually agreed to end his time at the club.

=== Pogoń Szczecin ===
On January 26, 2026, Acosta joined Polish Ekstraklasa side Pogoń Szczecin on an eighteen-month deal.

== International career ==
Acosta was born in the United States to a Japanese father and an African American mother, and was therefore eligible for Japan or the United States. After having played in the 2011 FIFA U-17 World Cup, Acosta became the youngest member of the U.S. squad at the 2013 FIFA U-20 World Cup. He was also part of the squad two years later at the 2015 FIFA U-20 World Cup.

Acosta made his senior international debut for the United States in a friendly versus Iceland on January 31, 2016. Acosta scored his first senior international goal in a 2–1 friendly win over Ghana on July 1, 2017, curling a direct free kick into the bottom corner for the eventual game-winner. He was selected to the U.S. squad for the 2017 CONCACAF Gold Cup, which the U.S. would go on to win. Acosta appeared in five of six games, including all three knock-out matches. Acosta made six appearances in international friendlies in 2018, scoring against Colombia on October 12 and assisting Josh Sargent's goal against Peru on October 16.

Following an almost 24-month absence from national team duty, Acosta was selected for a December 2020 camp on November 30, 2020, alongside fellow Rapids teammates Cole Bassett and Sam Vines. Acosta replaced Sebastian Lletget in the 68th minute of a 6–0 friendly win over El Salvador on December 9 at Inter Miami CF Stadium in Ft. Lauderdale, Florida. Acosta was called up again in January 2021 alongside Rapids teammates Vines and Jonathan Lewis, playing 90 minutes and assisting on Lewis' second goal in a 7–0 friendly win over Trinidad & Tobago at Exploria Stadium in Orlando, Florida, on January 31. During the 2021 calendar year, Acosta appeared in 21 out of a possible 22 matches for the United States, becoming the first player to do so since 1994.

Acosta was a key member for 2022 World Cup qualification, playing both central and defensive midfield. Acosta jointly led the USMNT along with Tyler Adams and Antonee Robinson with 13 appearances out of a possible 14 qualifiers. Acosta made the final World Cup squad, becoming the first Asian American man to appear for the United States in a World Cup, playing in matches against Wales and Iran.

Acosta captained the US in a friendly against Colombia on January 28, 2023, playing 90 minutes in a scoreless draw.

== Career statistics ==
=== Club ===
As of match played May 23, 2026

Appearances and goals by club, season and competition
Club	Season	League			National cup (Note: Includes U.S. Open Cup)		Continental		Other		Total	
Club	Season	Division	Apps	Goals	Apps	Goals	Apps	Goals	Apps	Goals	Apps	Goals
FC Dallas	2013	MLS	13	0	0	0	—		—		13	0
FC Dallas	2014	MLS	15	0	0	0	—		1 (Note: Appearance(s) in MLS Cup playoffs)	0	16	0
FC Dallas	2015	MLS	21	3	2	1	—		3	0	26	4
FC Dallas	2016	MLS	32	2	5	0	3 (Note: Appearance(s) in CONCACAF Champions League)	0	2	0	42	2
FC Dallas	2017	MLS	23	3	0	0	4	3	—		27	6
FC Dallas	2018	MLS	13	1	2	0	—		—		15	1
FC Dallas	Total		117	9	9	1	7	3	6	0	139	13
Colorado Rapids	2018	MLS	12	2	0	0	—		—		12	2
Colorado Rapids	2019	MLS	31	2	1	0	—		—		32	2
Colorado Rapids	2020	MLS	15 (Note: Includes three appearances and one goal in MLS is Back Tournament group stage)	2	—		—		1	0	16	2
Colorado Rapids	2021	MLS	21	1	—		—		1	0	22	1
Colorado Rapids	Total		79	7	1	0	—		2	0	82	7
Los Angeles FC	2022	MLS	32	2	3	0	—		4 (Note: One appearance in Leagues Cup, three appearances in MLS Cup playoffs)	1	39	3
Los Angeles FC	2023	MLS	24	0	0	0	7	1	9 (Note: Three appearances in Leagues Cup, one appearance in Campeones Cup, five appearances in MLS Cup playoffs)	0	40	1
Los Angeles FC	Total		56	2	3	0	7	1	13	1	79	4
Chicago Fire	2024	MLS	34	3	—		—		2 (Note: Appearances in Leagues Cup)	0	36	3
Chicago Fire	2025	MLS	19	0	2	0	—		1	0	22	0
Chicago Fire	Total		53	3	2	0	—		3	0	58	3
Pogoń Szczecin	2025–26	Ekstraklasa	11	1	—		—		—		11	1
Pogoń Szczecin II	2025–26	III liga, group II	1	0	—		—		—		1	0
Career total			317	22	15	1	14	4	24	1	370	28

=== International ===
As of match played April 19, 2023

Appearances and goals by national team and year
National team	Year	Apps	Goals
United States	2016	4	0
United States	2017	13	1
United States	2018	6	1
United States	2020	1	0
United States	2021	21	0
United States	2022	10	0
United States	2023	3	0
Total		58	2

Scores and results list the United States' goal tally first, score column indicates score after each Acosta goal.

List of international goals scored by Kellyn Acosta
No.	Date	Venue	Opponent	Score	Result	Competition
1	July 1, 2017	Rentschler Field, East Hartford, United States	Ghana	2–0	2–1	Friendly
2	October 11, 2018	Raymond James Stadium, Tampa, United States	Colombia	1–1	2–4	Friendly

== Honors ==
FC Dallas

- Supporters' Shield: 2016
- U.S. Open Cup: 2016

Los Angeles FC

- MLS Cup: 2022
- Supporters' Shield: 2022

United States U17

- CONCACAF U-17 Championship: 2011

United States

- CONCACAF Gold Cup: 2017, 2021
- CONCACAF Nations League: 2019–20
