= Otis Earle =

English footballer

Personal information
- Date of birth: 17 January 1992 (age 34)
- Place of birth: London, England
- Position: Defender

College career
Years	Team	Apps	(Gls)
2011–2014	UC Riverside Highlanders		

Senior career*
Years	Team	Apps	(Gls)
2014	FC Tucson	5	(0)
2015	FC Dallas	0	(0)
2015	→ Arizona United (loan)	6	(0)
- * Club domestic league appearances and goals

Otis Earle (born 17 January 1992) is an English former professional footballer who played as a defender.

== Career ==
=== Youth ===
Earle attended Epsom College in Surrey before moving to America to study at University of California, Riverside from 2011 to 2014. He also played in the Premier Development League for FC Tucson in 2014.

=== Professional ===
On 15 January 2015, Earle was selected in the first round (15th overall) of the 2015 MLS SuperDraft by FC Dallas. He made his professional debut for Dallas in a 4–1 US Open Cup win over Oklahoma City Energy on 16 June 2015. Two days later, he moved on loan to Arizona United. He played six times for Arizona as injuries restricted his game time. He was released by Dallas at the end of the 2015 season. In January 2017, he joined New England Revolution on trial.

== Personal life ==
Earle is the son of the former Port Vale, Wimbledon and Jamaica national team footballer and World Cup goalscorer Robbie Earle. He holds a U.S. green card which qualifies him as a domestic player for MLS roster purposes.
