= Sam Vines =

American soccer player (born 1999)

Personal information
- Full name: Samuel Marqus Lloyd Vines
- Date of birth: May 31, 1999 (age 27)
- Place of birth: Colorado Springs, Colorado, US
- Height: 5 ft 10 in (1.78 m)
- Position: Left-back

Team information
- Current team: San Diego FC (on loan from Houston Dynamo)
- Number: 23

Youth career
- –2013: Pride SC
- 2013–2017: Colorado Rapids

Senior career*
Years	Team	Apps	(Gls)
2017	Charlotte Independence	0	(0)
2018–2021	Colorado Rapids	53	(2)
2018	→ Charlotte Independence (loan)	29	(0)
2021–2023	Royal Antwerp	44	(2)
2024–2026	Colorado Rapids	27	(1)
2026–	Houston Dynamo	3	(0)
2026–	→ San Diego FC (loan)	0	(0)

International career^{‡}
2017	United States U18	1	(0)
2019–2021	United States U23	3	(0)
2020–2022	United States	9	(1)
Medal record
Representing United States
Winner	CONCACAF Gold Cup	2021
- * Club domestic league appearances and goals as of October 26, 2024 ‡ National team caps and goals as of September 23, 2022

Samuel Marqus Lloyd Vines (born May 31, 1999) is an American professional soccer player who plays as a left-back for Major League Soccer club San Diego FC on loan from Houston Dynamo.

== Club career ==
=== Colorado Rapids ===
Whilst with the Colorado Rapids academy, Vines spent time with United Soccer League side Charlotte Independence during their 2017 season.

On February 23, 2018, Vines signed a homegrown player contract with Colorado Rapids. He was loaned back out to their affiliate Charlotte Independence on March 8, 2018.

In 2019, Vines made 23 starts among 26 MLS appearances for Colorado, playing 90 minutes in 18 of Colorado's last 19 league matches. In 2020, Vines played every minute of every regular season match for Colorado, becoming the only player on the roster to do so. Vines picked up his first career MLS assist on Sep 9 against Houston Dynamo, finding Lalas Abubakar for a stoppage-time equalizer. Vines scored his first career MLS goal on Sep 12 in Colorado's 5–0 win over Real Salt Lake to reclaim the Rocky Mountain Cup. Vines made a substitute appearance in Colorado's MLS Cup Playoffs first-round loss to Minnesota United FC. He finished the season with one goal and three assists.

=== Antwerp ===
In August 2021, Vines headed to Belgium to sign a three-year contract with a one-year option with Royal Antwerp. At the beginning of September, he suffered a collarbone fracture in training which required surgery.

=== Colorado Rapids ===
Vines returned to Major League Soccer (MLS) side Colorado Rapids on January 22, 2024, signing a four-year contract through 2027. On February 21, 2026, the Rapids waived Vines' contract.

=== Houston Dynamo ===
On March 20, 2026, Vines signed with fellow MLS club Houston Dynamo through the 2027 season.

==== Loan to San Diego FC ====
On 3 September 2026, Vines joined San Diego FC on loan for the remainder of the 2026 season, with an option to extend the loan through December 2027.

== International career ==
Prior to making his full senior international debut, Vines was a regular call-up to the U.S. U-23 MNT. Vines was called up to Jason Kreis' 25-player under-23 camp in Miami in October 2019. Vines made his under-23 debut in a 6–1 win over El Salvador at Florida International University on October 15, coming on for Chris Gloster in the 66th minute. He played 90 minutes in a 1–0 loss to Brazil at the United International Football Festival in the Canary Islands on November 14.

Vines was called up to the United States national team for the first time on January 2, 2020. Vines made his senior debut, starting in a friendly against Costa Rica on February 1, 2020, becoming the first Colorado Rapids homegrown to start for the United States senior national team side. Vines was called up again for the senior team's December 2020 camp on November 30. Vines played the first half of the a 6–0 friendly win over El Salvador on December 9 at Inter Miami CF Stadium in Ft. Lauderdale, Florida.

On January 5, 2021, Vines was named to the joint senior and under-23 January camp in Bradenton, Florida, ahead of Olympic qualifying. Vines played 64 minutes and assisted Jesús Ferreira's first goal in a 7–0 friendly win over Trinidad & Tobago at Exploria Stadium in Orlando on January 31.

== Career statistics ==
=== Club ===
As of match played December 8, 2024

Appearances and goals by club, season and competition
Club	Season	League			Playoffs		National cup (Note: Includes U.S. Open Cup, Belgian Cup)		Continental		Other		Total	
Club	Season	Division	Apps	Goals	Apps	Goals	Apps	Goals	Apps	Goals	Apps	Goals	Apps	Goals
Charlotte Independence	2017	United Soccer League	0	0	—		—		—		—		0	0
Charlotte Independence (loan)	2018	United Soccer League	29	0	—		1	0	—		—		30	0
Colorado Rapids	2018	MLS	1	0	—		—		—		—		1	0
Colorado Rapids	2019	MLS	26	0	—		1	0	—		—		27	0
Colorado Rapids	2020	MLS	18	1	1	0	—		—		—		19	1
Colorado Rapids	2021	MLS	8	1	—		—		—		—		8	1
Colorado Rapids	Total		53	2	1	0	1	0	—		—		55	2
Royal Antwerp	2021–22	Belgian Pro League	24	0	—		1	0	5 (Note: Appearances in UEFA Europa League)	0	—		30	0
Royal Antwerp	2022–23	Belgian Pro League	15	1	—		—		5 (Note: Appearances in UEFA Europa Conference League)	0	—		20	1
Royal Antwerp	2023–24	Belgian Pro League	5	1	—		—		2 (Note: Appearances in UEFA Champions League)	0	1 (Note: Appearance in Belgian Super Cup)	0	8	1
Royal Antwerp	Total		44	2	—		1	0	12	0	1	0	58	2
Colorado Rapids	2024	MLS	27	1	2	0	—		—		7 (Note: Appearances in Leagues Cup)	0	36	1
Career total			153	5	3	0	3	0	12	0	8	0	179	5

=== International ===
As of match played September 23, 2022

Appearances and goals by national team and year
National team	Year	Apps	Goals
United States	2020	2	0
United States	2021	6	1
United States	2022	1	0
Total		9	1

As of match played July 11, 2021.
Scores and results list the United's goal tally first, score column indicates score after each Vines goal.

List of international goals scored by Sam Vines
No.	Date	Venue	Cap	Opponent	Score	Result	Competition
1	July 11, 2021	Children's Mercy Park, Kansas City, United States	4	Haiti	1–0	1–0	2021 CONCACAF Gold Cup

== Honors ==
Royal Antwerp

- Belgian Pro League: 2022–23
- Belgian Cup: 2022–23
- Belgian Super Cup: 2023

United States

- CONCACAF Gold Cup: 2021
