= United States men's national soccer team results (2020–present) =

This is a compilation of every international soccer game played by the United States men's national soccer team from 2020 through 2029. It includes the team's record for that year, each game played during the year, and the date each game was played. It also lists the U.S. goal scorers.

Home team is listed first. U.S. is listed first at home or neutral site.

Records are in win-loss-tie format. Games decided in penalty kicks are counted as ties, as per the FIFA standard.

== 2020 ==
Wins	Losses	Draws
3	0	1

February 1 Friendly	United States	1–0	Costa Rica	Carson, California
15:55 ET	Llanez 50' (pen.)	Report		Stadium: Dignity Health Sports Park; Attendance: 9,172; Referee: Oshane Nation (Jamaica)

November 12 Friendly	Wales	0–0	United States	Swansea, Wales
14:45 ET		Report		Stadium: Liberty Stadium; Referee: Nick Walsh (Scotland)
Note: The match was played behind closed doors.

November 16 Friendly	United States	6–2	Panama	Wiener Neustadt, Austria
14:45 ET	Reyna 18'; Gioacchini 22', 26'; Soto 83', 90+1'; Lletget 87'	Report	Fajardo 8', 79'	Stadium: Stadion Wiener Neustadt; Referee: Harald Lechner (Austria)
Note: The match was played behind closed doors.

December 9 Friendly	United States	6–0	El Salvador	Fort Lauderdale, Florida
19:30 ET	Arriola 17'; Mueller 20', 25'; Lletget 23'; Akinola 27'; Aaronson 50'	Report		Stadium: Inter Miami CF Stadium; Attendance: 2,500; Referee: Jose Raul Torres Rivera (Puerto Rico)

== 2021 ==
Wins	Losses	Draws
17	2	3

January 31 Friendly	United States	7–0	Trinidad and Tobago	Orlando, Florida
19:00 ET	Lewis 2', 55'; Ferreira 9', 62'; Arriola 22', 41'; Robinson 52'	Report		Stadium: Exploria Stadium; Attendance: 3,503; Referee: Saíd Martínez (Honduras)

March 25 Friendly	United States	4–1	Jamaica	Wiener Neustadt, Austria
13:00 ET	Dest 34'; Aaronson 53'; Lletget 83', 90'	Report	Lowe 70'	Stadium: Stadion Wiener Neustadt; Referee: Christian-Petru Ciochirca (Austria)
Note: The match was played behind closed doors.

March 28 Friendly	Northern Ireland	1–2	United States	Belfast, Northern Ireland
12:00 ET	McGinn 88'	Report	Reyna 30'; Pulisic 59' (pen.)	Stadium: Windsor Park; Referee: Robert Jenkins (Wales)
Note: The match was played behind closed doors.

May 30 Friendly	Switzerland	2–1	United States	St. Gallen, Switzerland
13:15 ET	Rodríguez 10'; Zuber 63'	Report	Lletget 5'	Stadium: Kybunpark; Referee: Harm Osmers (Germany)
Note: The match was played behind closed doors.

June 3 Nations League SF	United States	1–0	Honduras	Denver, Colorado
17:30 ET	Siebatcheu 89'	Report		Stadium: Empower Field at Mile High; Attendance: 34,451; Referee: Oshane Nation (Jamaica)

June 6 Nations League F	United States	3–2 (a.e.t.)	Mexico	Denver, Colorado
21:00 ET	Reyna 27'; McKennie 82'; Pulisic 114' (pen.)	Report	Corona 2'; Lainez 79'	Stadium: Empower Field at Mile High; Attendance: 37,648; Referee: John Pitti (Panama)

June 9 Friendly	United States	4–0	Costa Rica	Sandy, Utah
19:00 ET	Aaronson 8'; Dike 42'; Cannon 52'; Reyna 77' (pen.)	Report		Stadium: Rio Tinto Stadium; Attendance: 19,007; Referee: Tristley Bassue (St. Kitts and Nevis)

July 11 Gold Cup GS	United States	1–0	Haiti	Kansas City, Kansas
21:00 ET	Vines 8'	Report		Stadium: Children's Mercy Park; Attendance: 12,664; Referee: Saíd Martínez (Honduras)

July 15 Gold Cup GS	United States	6–1	Martinique	Kansas City, Kansas
22:00 ET	Dike 14', 59'; Camille 23' (o.g.); Robinson 50'; Zardes 70'; Gioacchini 90'	Report	Rivière 64' (pen.)	Stadium: Children's Mercy Park; Attendance: 7,511; Referee: Mario Escobar (Guatemala)

July 18 Gold Cup GS	United States	1–0	Canada	Kansas City, Kansas
17:00 ET	Moore 1'	Report		Stadium: Children's Mercy Park; Attendance: 18,467; Referee: Adonai Escobedo (Mexico)

July 25 Gold Cup QF	United States	1–0	Jamaica	Arlington, Texas
21:30 ET	Hoppe 83'	Report		Stadium: AT&T Stadium; Attendance: 41,318; Referee: César Ramos (Mexico)

July 29 Gold Cup SF	United States	1–0	Qatar	Austin, Texas
19:30 ET	Zardes 86'	Report		Stadium: Q2 Stadium; Attendance: 20,500; Referee: Juan Gabriel Calderón (Costa Rica)

August 1 Gold Cup F	United States	1–0 (a.e.t.)	Mexico	Paradise, Nevada
20:30 ET	Robinson 117'	Report		Stadium: Allegiant Stadium; Attendance: 61,114; Referee: Saíd Martínez (Honduras)

September 2 WCQ R3	El Salvador	0–0	United States	San Salvador, El Salvador
22:05 ET		Report		Stadium: Estadio Cuscatlán; Attendance: 29,000; Referee: Juan Calderón (Costa Rica)

September 5 WCQ R3	United States	1–1	Canada	Nashville, Tennessee
19:00 ET	Aaronson 55'	Report	Larin 62'	Stadium: Nissan Stadium; Attendance: 43,028; Referee: Oshane Nation (Jamaica)

September 8 WCQ R3	Honduras	1–4	United States	San Pedro Sula, Honduras
22:30 ET	Moya 27'	Report	A. Robinson 48'; Pepi 75'; Aaronson 86'; Lletget 90+3'	Stadium: Estadio Olímpico Metropolitano; Attendance: 31,000; Referee: Fernando Hernández Gómez (Mexico)

October 7 WCQ R3	United States	2–0	Jamaica	Austin, Texas
19:30 ET	Pepi 49', 62'	Report		Stadium: Q2 Stadium; Attendance: 20,500; Referee: Reon Radix (Grenada)

October 10 WCQ R3	Panama	1–0	United States	Panama City, Panama
17:00 ET	Godoy 54'	Report		Stadium: Estadio Rommel Fernández; Attendance: 21,000; Referee: César Ramos (Mexico)

October 13 WCQ R3	United States	2–1	Costa Rica	Columbus, Ohio
19:00 ET	Dest 25'; Moreira 66' (o.g.)	Report	Fuller 1'	Stadium: Lower.com Field; Attendance: 20,165; Referee: Daneon Parchment (Jamaica)

November 12 WCQ R3	United States	2–0	Mexico	Cincinnati, Ohio
21:10 ET	Pulisic 74'; McKennie 85'	Report		Stadium: TQL Stadium; Attendance: 26,000; Referee: Iván Barton (El Salvador)

November 16 WCQ R3	Jamaica	1–1	United States	Kingston, Jamaica
17:00 ET	Antonio 22'	Report	Weah 11'	Stadium: Independence Park; Attendance: 4,100; Referee: Juan Calderón (Costa Rica)

December 18 Friendly	United States	1–0	Bosnia and Herzegovina	Carson, California
20:00 ET	Bassett 89'	Report		Stadium: Dignity Health Sports Park; Attendance: 11,044; Referee: Keylor Herrera (Costa Rica)

== 2022 ==
Wins	Losses	Draws
6	4	6

January 27 WCQ R3	United States	1–0	El Salvador	Columbus, Ohio
19:00 ET	A. Robinson 52'	Report		Stadium: Lower.com Field; Attendance: 20,000; Referee: Bryan López (Guatemala)

January 30 WCQ R3	Canada	2–0	United States	Hamilton, Canada
15:05 ET	Larin 7'; Adekugbe 90+5'	Report		Stadium: Tim Hortons Field; Attendance: 12,000; Referee: César Ramos (Mexico)

February 2 WCQ R3	United States	3–0	Honduras	Saint Paul, Minnesota
19:30 ET	McKennie 8'; Zimmerman 37'; Pulisic 67'	Report		Stadium: Allianz Field; Attendance: 19,202; Referee: Oshane Nation (Jamaica)

March 24 WCQ R3	Mexico	0–0	United States	Mexico City, Mexico
22:00 ET		Report		Stadium: Estadio Azteca; Attendance: 47,000; Referee: Mario Escobar (Guatemala)

March 27 WCQ R3	United States	5–1	Panama	Orlando, Florida
19:00 ET	Pulisic 17' (pen.), 45+4' (pen.), 65'; Arriola 23'; Ferreira 27'	Report	Godoy 86'	Stadium: Exploria Stadium; Attendance: 25,022; Referee: Iván Barton (El Salvador)

March 30 WCQ R3	Costa Rica	2–0	United States	San José, Costa Rica
21:00 ET	Vargas 51'; Contreras 59'	Report		Stadium: Estadio Nacional; Attendance: 35,000; Referee: Drew Fischer (Canada)

June 1 Friendly	United States	3–0	Morocco	Cincinnati, Ohio
19:30 ET	Aaronson 26'; Weah 32'; Wright 64' (pen.)	Report		Stadium: TQL Stadium; Attendance: 24,002; Referee: Ismael Cornejo (El Salvador)

June 5 Friendly	United States	0–0	Uruguay	Kansas City, Kansas
17:00 ET		Report		Stadium: Children's Mercy Park; Attendance: 19,569; Referee: Adonai Escobedo (Mexico)

June 10 Nations League GS	United States	5–0	Grenada	Austin, Texas
22:00 ET	Ferreira 43', 54', 56', 78'; Arriola 62'	Report		Stadium: Q2 Stadium; Attendance: 20,500; Referee: Saíd Martínez (Honduras)

June 14 Nations League GS	El Salvador	1–1	United States	San Salvador, El Salvador
22:00 ET	Larín 35'; Rodríguez (red card) 79'	Report	Arriola (red card) 70'; Morris 90+1'	Stadium: Estadio Cuscatlán; Attendance: 6,313; Referee: César Ramos (Mexico)

September 23 Friendly	United States	0–2	Japan	Düsseldorf, Germany
08:25 ET		Report	Kamada 24'; Mitoma 88'	Stadium: Merkur Spiel-Arena; Attendance: 5,149; Referee: Felix Zwayer (Germany)

September 27 Friendly	United States	0–0	Saudi Arabia	Murcia, Spain
14:00 ET		Report		Stadium: Estadio Nueva Condomina; Attendance: 364; Referee: Ivan Bebek (Croatia)

November 21 World Cup GS	United States	1–1	Wales	Al Rayyan, Qatar
22:00 AST	Weah 36'		Bale 82' (pen.)	Stadium: Ahmad bin Ali Stadium; Attendance: 43,418; Referee: Abdulrahman Al-Jassim (Qatar)

November 25 World Cup GS	England	0–0	United States	Al Khor, Qatar
22:00 AST				Stadium: Al Bayt Stadium; Attendance: 68,463; Referee: Jesús Valenzuela (Venezuela)

November 29 World Cup GS	Iran	0–1	United States	Doha, Qatar
22:00 AST		Report	Pulisic 38'	Stadium: Al Thumama Stadium; Attendance: 42,127; Referee: Antonio Mateu Lahoz (Spain)

December 3 World Cup R16	Netherlands	3–1	United States	Al Rayyan, Qatar
18:00 AST	Depay 10'; Blind 45+1'; Dumfries 81'	Report	Wright 76'	Stadium: Khalifa International Stadium; Attendance: 44,846; Referee: Wilton Sampaio (Brazil)

== 2023 ==
Wins	Losses	Draws
10	3	5

January 25 Friendly	United States	1–2	Serbia	Los Angeles, California
22:00 ET	Vázquez 29'	Report	Ilić 43'; Simić 46'	Stadium: BMO Stadium; Attendance: 11,475; Referee: Daneon Parchment (Jamaica)

January 28 Friendly	United States	0–0	Colombia	Carson, California
19:30 ET		Report		Stadium: Dignity Health Sports Park; Attendance: 27,000; Referee: Saíd Martínez (Honduras)

March 24 Nations League GS	Grenada	1–7	United States	St. George's, Grenada
20:00 ET	Hippolyte 32'	Report	Pepi 4', 53'; Aaronson 20'; McKennie 31', 34'; Pulisic 49'; Zendejas 72'	Stadium: Kirani James Athletic Stadium; Attendance: 7,032; Referee: Daneon Parchment (Jamaica)

March 27 Nations League GS	United States	1–0	El Salvador	Orlando, Florida
19:30 ET	Pepi 62'	Report		Stadium: Exploria Stadium; Attendance: 18,947; Referee: Mario Escobar (Guatemala)

April 19 Continental Clásico	United States	1–1	Mexico	Glendale, Arizona
22:00 ET	Ferreira 81'	Report	Antuna 55'	Stadium: State Farm Stadium; Attendance: 55,730; Referee: Bryan López (Guatemala)

June 15 Nations League SF	United States	3–0	Mexico	Paradise, Nevada
22:00 ET	Pulisic 37', 46'; McKennie (red card) 71'; Pepi 78'; Dest (red card) 85'	Report	Montes (red card) 69'; Arteaga (red card) 85'	Stadium: Allegiant Stadium; Attendance: 65,000; Referee: Iván Barton (El Salvador)

June 18 Nations League F	United States	2–0	Canada	Paradise, Nevada
20:30 ET	Richards 12'; Balogun 34'	Report		Stadium: Allegiant Stadium; Attendance: 35,000; Referee: Saíd Martínez (Honduras)

June 24 Gold Cup GS	United States	1–1	Jamaica	Chicago, Illinois
22:00 ET	Vázquez 88'	Report	Lowe 13'	Stadium: Soldier Field; Attendance: 36,666; Referee: César Ramos (Mexico)

June 28 Gold Cup GS	United States	6–0	Saint Kitts and Nevis	St. Louis, Missouri
22:00 ET	Mihailovic 12', 79'; Reynolds 14'; Ferreira 16', 25', 50'	Report		Stadium: CityPark; Attendance: 21,216; Referee: Juan Calderón (Costa Rica)

July 2 Gold Cup GS	United States	6–0	Trinidad and Tobago	Charlotte, North Carolina
22:00 ET	Ferreira 14', 38', 45+3' (pen.); Cowell 65'; Busio 79'; Vázquez 90+4'	Report		Stadium: Bank of America Stadium; Attendance: 47,382; Referee: Mario Escobar (Guatemala)

July 9 Gold Cup QF	United States	2–2 (a.e.t.) (3–2 p)	Canada	Cincinnati, Ohio
19:30 ET	Vázquez 88'; Kennedy 114' (o.g.)	Report	Vitória 90+3' (pen.); Shaffelburg 109'	Stadium: TQL Stadium; Attendance: 24,979; Referee: Marco Ortiz (Mexico)
	Penalties
	Vázquez (penalty missed); Cowell (penalty scored); Busio (penalty scored); Ferreira (penalty scored)		(penalty missed) Vitória; (penalty missed) Fraser; (penalty scored) Miller; (penalty scored) Russell-Rowe; (penalty missed) Brym

July 12 Gold Cup SF	United States	1–1 (a.e.t.) (4–5 p)	Panama	San Diego, California
19:30 ET	Ferreira 105'	Report	I. Anderson 99'	Stadium: Snapdragon Stadium; Attendance: 31,690; Referee: Walter López (Guatemala)
	Penalties
	Ferreira (penalty missed); Mihailovic (penalty scored); Morris (penalty scored); Gressel (penalty scored); Miazga (penalty scored); Roldan (penalty missed)		(penalty scored) Escobar; (penalty scored) Díaz; (penalty missed) Martínez; (penalty scored) Bárcenas; (penalty scored) Waterman; (penalty scored) Carrasquilla

September 9 Friendly	United States	3–0	Uzbekistan	St. Louis, Missouri
17:30 ET	Weah 4'; Pepi 90+1'; Pulisic 90+5' (pen.)	Report		Stadium: CityPark; Attendance: 15,569; Referee: Nelson Salgado (Honduras)

September 12 Friendly	United States	4–0	Oman	Saint Paul, Minnesota
20:30 ET	Balogun 13'; Aaronson 60'; Pepi 79'; Al-Braiki 81' (o.g.)	Report		Stadium: Allianz Field; Attendance: 13,665; Referee: Mario Escobar (Guatemala)

October 14 Friendly	United States	1–3	Germany	East Hartford, Connecticut
15:00 ET	Pulisic 27'	Report	Gündoğan 39'; Füllkrug 58'; Musiala 61'	Stadium: Pratt & Whitney Stadium; Attendance: 37,743; Referee: Fernando Guerrero (Mexico)

October 17 Friendly	United States	4–0	Ghana	Nashville, Tennessee
20:30 ET	Reyna 10', 39'; Pulisic 19' (pen.); Balogun 22'	Report		Stadium: Geodis Park; Attendance: 18,468; Referee: Marco Ortiz (Mexico)

November 16 Nations League QF	United States	3–0	Trinidad and Tobago	Austin, Texas
21:00 ET	Pepi 82'; Robinson 86'; Reyna 89'	Report	Powder (yellow card) 18' (yellow-red card) 38'	Stadium: Q2 Stadium; Attendance: 19,850; Referee: Oshane Nation (Jamaica)

November 20 Nations League QF	Trinidad and Tobago	2–1	United States	Port of Spain, Trinidad and Tobago
19:00 ET	Moore 43'; Jones 57'	Report	Robinson 25'; Dest (yellow card) 39' (yellow-red card) 39'	Stadium: Hasely Crawford Stadium; Attendance: 9,438; Referee: Walter López (Guatemala)

== 2024 ==
Wins	Losses	Draws
6	6	2

January 20 Friendly	United States	0–1	Slovenia	San Antonio, Texas
3:00 ET		Report	Gradišar 26'	Stadium: Toyota Field; Attendance: 9,191; Referee: Pierre-Luc Lauziere (Canada)

March 21 Nations League SF	United States	3–1 (a.e.t.)	Jamaica	Arlington, Texas
19:00 ET	Burke 90+6' (o.g.); Wright 96', 109'	Report	Leigh 1'	Stadium: AT&T Stadium; Attendance: 40,926; Referee: Selvin Brown (Honduras)

March 24 Nations League F	United States	2–0	Mexico	Arlington, Texas
21:15 ET	Adams 45'; Reyna 63'	Report		Stadium: AT&T Stadium; Attendance: 59,471; Referee: Drew Fischer (Canada)

June 8 Friendly	United States	1–5	Colombia	Landover, Maryland
17:30 ET	Weah 58'	Report	J. Arias 6'; Borré 19'; Ríos 77'; Carrascal 85'; Sinisterra 88'	Stadium: Commanders Field; Attendance: 55,494; Referee: Fernando Hernández Gómez (Mexico)

June 12 Continental Clásico	United States	1–1	Brazil	Orlando, Florida
7:30 ET	Pulisic 26'	Report	Rodrygo 17'	Stadium: Camping World Stadium; Attendance: 60,016; Referee: Saíd Martínez (Honduras)

June 23 Copa América GS	United States	2–0	Bolivia	Arlington, Texas
17:00 CDT	Pulisic 3'; Balogun 44'	Report		Stadium: AT&T Stadium; Attendance: 47,873; Referee: Maurizio Mariani (Italy)

June 27 Copa América GS	United States	1–2	Panama	Atlanta, Georgia
18:00 EDT	Weah (red card) 18'; Balogun 22'	Report	Blackman 26'; Fajardo 83'; Carrasquilla (red card) 88'	Stadium: Mercedes-Benz Stadium; Attendance: 59,145; Referee: Iván Barton (El Salvador)

July 1 Copa América GS	United States	0–1	Uruguay	Kansas City, Missouri
20:00 CDT		Report	M. Olivera 66'	Stadium: Arrowhead Stadium; Attendance: 55,460; Referee: Kevin Ortega (Peru)

September 7 Friendly	United States	1–2	Canada	Kansas City, Kansas
15:00 CDT	de la Torre 66'	Report	Shaffelburg 17'; David 58'	Stadium: Children's Mercy Park; Attendance: 10,523; Referee: Keylor Herrera (Costa Rica)

September 10 Friendly	United States	1–1	New Zealand	Cincinnati, Ohio
19:00 ET	Pulisic 69'	Report	Waine 89'	Stadium: TQL Stadium; Attendance: 15,711; Referee: Selvin Brown (Honduras)

October 12 Friendly	United States	2–0	Panama	Austin, Texas
21:00 CDT	Musah 49'; Pepi 90+4'	Report		Stadium: Q2 Stadium; Attendance: 20,239; Referee: Katia Itzel García (Mexico)

October 15 Friendly	Mexico	2–0	United States	Zapopan, Mexico
22:30 ET	Jiménez 22'; Huerta 49'	Report		Stadium: Estadio Akron; Attendance: 43,537; Referee: Keylor Herrera (Costa Rica)

November 14 Nations League QF	Jamaica	0–1	United States	Kingston, Jamaica
20:00 ET	Holgate (yellow card) 76' (yellow-red card) 86'	Report	Pepi 5'	Stadium: Independence Park; Attendance: 25,500; Referee: Juan Gabriel Calderon (Costa Rica)

November 18 Nations League QF	United States	4–2	Jamaica	St. Louis, Missouri
20:00 ET	Pulisic 14' Bernard 33' (o.g.) Pepi 42' Weah 56'	Report	D. Gray 53', 68'	Stadium: CityPark; Attendance: 21,080; Referee: Mario Escobar (Guatemala)

== 2025 ==
Wins	Losses	Draws
10	6	2

January 18 Friendly	United States	3–1	Venezuela	Fort Lauderdale, Florida
3:00 ET	McGlynn 37'; Agyemang 39'; Miljevic 64'	Report	Yriarte 68'	Stadium: Chase Stadium; Attendance: 18,008; Referee: Steven Madrigal (Costa Rica)

January 22 Friendly	United States	3–0	Costa Rica	Orlando, Florida
7:00 ET	White 21'; Clark 77'; Agyemang 90'	Report		Stadium: Inter&Co Stadium; Attendance: 13,580; Referee: Cristopher Corado (Guatemala)

March 20 Nations League SF	United States	0–1	Panama	Inglewood, California
7:00 ET		Report	Waterman 90+4'	Stadium: SoFi Stadium; Referee: Oshane Nation (Jamaica)

March 23 Nations League 3rd	United States	1–2	Canada	Inglewood, California
6:00 ET	Agyemang 35'	Report	Oluwaseyi 27'; David 59'	Stadium: SoFi Stadium; Referee: Katia Itzel García (Mexico)

June 7 Friendly	United States	1–2	Turkey	East Hartford, Connecticut
15:30 ET	McGlynn 1'	Report	Güler 24'; Aktürkoğlu 27'	Stadium: Pratt & Whitney Stadium; Attendance: 34,023; Referee: Fernando Morón (Panama)

June 10 Friendly	United States	0–4	Switzerland	Nashville, Tennessee
20:00 ET		Report	Ndoye 13'; Aebischer 23'; Embolo 33'; Manzambi 36'	Stadium: Geodis Park; Attendance: 20,602; Referee: Andrew Samuel (Trinidad and Tobago)

June 15 Gold Cup GS	United States	5–0	Trinidad and Tobago	San Jose, California
6:00 ET	Tillman 16', 41'; Agyemang 44'; B. Aaronson 82'; Wright 84'	Report		Stadium: PayPal Park; Attendance: 12,610; Referee: Adonai Escobedo (Mexico)

June 19 Gold Cup GS	United States	1–0	Saudi Arabia	Austin, Texas
9:15 ET	Richards 63'	Report		Stadium: Q2 Stadium; Attendance: 11,727; Referee: Marco Ortiz (Mexico)

June 22 Gold Cup GS	United States	2–1	Haiti	Arlington, Texas
7:00 ET	Tillman 10'; Agyemang 75'	Report	Louicius 19'	Stadium: AT&T Stadium; Attendance: 20,918; Referee: Katia García (Mexico)

June 29 Gold Cup QF	United States	2–2 (4–3 p)	Costa Rica	Minneapolis, Minnesota
19:00 ET	Tillman (penalty missed) 37'; Luna 43'; Arfsten 47'	Report	Calvo 12' (pen.); Martínez 71'	Stadium: U.S. Bank Stadium; Attendance: 32,289; Referee: Walter López (Guatemala)
	Penalties
	Adams (penalty scored); Tillman (penalty scored); Berhalter (penalty missed); Freeman (penalty scored); Tolkin (penalty missed); Downs (penalty scored)		(penalty scored) Martínez; (penalty missed) J. Vargas; (penalty scored) Van der Putten; (penalty scored) Brenes; (penalty missed) Calvo; (penalty missed) Rojas

July 2 Gold Cup SF	United States	2–1	Guatemala	St. Louis, Missouri
19:00 ET	Luna 4', 15'	Report	Escobar 80'	Stadium: Energizer Park; Attendance: 22,423; Referee: Oshane Nation (Jamaica)

July 6 Gold Cup F	United States	1–2	Mexico	Houston, Texas
19:00 ET	Richards 4'	Report	Jiménez 27'; Ed. Álvarez 77'	Stadium: NRG Stadium; Attendance: 70,925; Referee: Mario Escobar (Guatemala)

September 6 Friendly	United States	0–2	South Korea	Harrison, New Jersey
17:00 ET		Report	Son Heung-min 18'; Lee Dong-gyeong 43'	Stadium: Sports Illustrated Stadium; Attendance: 26,500; Referee: Reon Radix (Grenada)

September 9 Friendly	United States	2–0	Japan	Columbus, Ohio
19:30 ET	Zendejas 30'; Balogun 64'	Report		Stadium: Lower.com Field; Attendance: 20,192; Referee: Bryan Lopez (Guatemala)

October 10 Friendly	United States	1–1	Ecuador	Austin, Texas
19:30 CT	Balogun 71'	Report	Valencia 24'	Stadium: Q2 Stadium; Attendance: 20,738; Referee: Filip Dujic (Canada)

October 14 Friendly	United States	2–1	Australia	Commerce City, Colorado
19:00 MT	Wright 33', 51'	Report	Bos 19'	Stadium: Dick's Sporting Goods Park; Attendance: 18,218; Referee: Kwinsi Williams (Trinidad and Tobago)

November 15 Friendly	United States	2–1	Paraguay	Chester, Pennsylvania
17:00 ET	Reyna 4'; Balogun 71'	Report	Arce 10'	Stadium: Subaru Park; Attendance: 17,224; Referee: Cristhofer Corado (Guatemala)

November 18 Friendly	United States	5–1	Uruguay	Tampa, Florida
18:30 ET	Berhalter 17'; Freeman 20', 31'; Luna 42'; Tessmann 68'	Report	de Arrascaeta 45+1'; Bentancur (yellow card) 50' (yellow-red card) 64'	Stadium: Raymond James Stadium; Attendance: 26,110; Referee: Julio Cesar de Jesus Luna Guzman (Guatemala)

== 2026 ==
Wins	Losses	Draws
10	5	0

March 28 Friendly	United States	2–5	Belgium	Atlanta, Georgia
15:30 EDT	McKennie 39'; Agyemang 87'	Report	Debast 45'; Onana 53'; De Ketelaere 59' (pen.); Lukébakio 68', 82'	Stadium: Mercedes-Benz Stadium; Attendance: 66,867; Referee: Esteban Ostojich (Uruguay)

March 31 Friendly	United States	0–2	Portugal	Atlanta, Georgia
19:00 EST		Report	Trincão 37'; Félix 59'	Stadium: Mercedes-Benz Stadium; Attendance: 72,297; Referee: Sven Jablonski (Germany)

May 31 Continental Clásico	United States	3–2	Senegal	Charlotte, North Carolina
15:30 EST	Dest 7'; Pulisic 20'; Balogun 63'	Report	Mané 44', 52'	Stadium: Bank of America Stadium; Attendance: 57,741; Referee: Nick Walsh (Scotland)

June 6 Friendly	United States	1–2	Germany	Chicago, Illinois
14:30 EST	A. Robinson 37'	Report	Havertz 2'; Sané 57'	Stadium: Soldier Field; Attendance: 63,636; Referee: Piero Maza (Chile)

June 12 World Cup GS	United States	4–1	Paraguay	Inglewood, California
18:00 PT	Bobadilla 7' (o.g.); Balogun 31', 45+5'; Reyna 90+8'	Report	Maurício 73'	Stadium: SoFi Stadium; Attendance: 70,492; Referee: Danny Makkelie (Netherlands)

June 19 World Cup GS	United States	2–0	Australia	Seattle, Washington
12:00 PT	Burgess 11' (o.g.); Freeman 43'	Report		Stadium: Lumen Field; Attendance: 66,925; Referee: Felix Zwayer (Germany)

June 25 World Cup GS	United States	2–3	Turkey	Inglewood, California
19:00 PT	Trusty 3'; Berhalter 49'	Report	Güler 10'; Yılmaz 31'; Ayhan 90+8'	Stadium: SoFi Stadium; Attendance: 70,492; Referee: Mustapha Ghorbal (Algeria)

July 1 World Cup R32	United States	2–0	Bosnia and Herzegovina	Santa Clara, California
20:00 ET	Balogun 45' (red card) 64'; Tillman 82'	Report		Stadium: Levi's Stadium; Attendance: 68,827; Referee: Raphael Claus (Brazil)

July 6 World Cup R16	United States	1–4	Belgium	Seattle, Washington
20:00 ET	Tillman 31'	Report	De Ketelare 9', 33'; Vanaken 57'; Lukaku 90+3'	Stadium: Lumen Field; Attendance: 66,925; Referee: Adham Makhadmeh (Jordan)

September 26 Friendly	United States	4–1	Peru	Orlando, Florida
16:30 EDT	Ellis 4'; Tillman 66' (pen.); Hall 72'; Berhalter 90'	Source	Lapadula 15'	Stadium: Inter&Co Stadium; Attendance: 24,228; Referee: Steffon Dewar (Jamaica)

September 29 Friendly	United States	4–2	Chile	St. Louis, Missouri
19:00 CDT	Berhalter 37'; Hall 51'; Richards 72'; Albert 90+3'	Source	Ulloa 45+1'; Gutiérrez 49'	Stadium: Energizer Park; Attendance: 21,680; Referee: Jorge Camacho (Mexico)

October 3 Friendly	United States	3–0	Mexico	Glendale, Arizona
19:00 MDT	Hall 38'; Sullivan 62'; Tillman 84'	Source		Stadium: State Farm Stadium; Attendance: 64,932; Referee: Selvin Brown (Honduras)

October 6 Friendly	United States	1–0	Canada	St. Paul, Minnesota
19:00 CDT	Ellis 29'	Source		Stadium: Allianz Field; Attendance: 19,182; Referee: Steven Madrigal (Costa Rica)

November 14 Nations League QF	Haiti	0–6	United States	Miami, FL
16:30 EST		Report	Trusty 10'; Hall 52'; Pulisic 62' (pen.), 63'; McKennie 68'; Balogun 82'	Stadium: Nu Stadium; Attendance: 21,597; Referee: Walter López (Guatemala)

November 17 Nations League QF	United States	2–0	Haiti	Cincinnati, Ohio
19:00 EST	Pulisic 25'; Hall 43'	Report		Stadium: TQL Stadium; Attendance: 24,001; Referee: Oshane Nation (Jamaica)

== See also ==
- United States at the FIFA World Cup
- United States at the CONCACAF Gold Cup
- United States at the Copa América
