= Walter Cabrera =

Paraguayan footballer (born 1990)

Personal information
- Date of birth: 7 January 1990 (age 36)
- Place of birth: Paraguay
- Height: 1.82 m (6 ft 0 in)
- Position: Centre back

Team information
- Current team: Sportivo Ameliano
- Number: 13

Youth career
- Cerro Porteño

Senior career*
| Years | Team | Apps | (Gls) |
| 2013–2019 | General Díaz | 150 | (8) |
| 2014 | → FC Dallas (loan) | 0 | (0) |
| 2020 | 12 de Octubre | 6 | (0) |
| 2021 | River Plate Asunción | 2 | (0) |
| 2021– | Sportivo Ameliano | 86 | (4) |
- * Club domestic league appearances and goals as of 13 August 2025

Walter Cabrera (born 7 January 1990) is a professional Paraguayan football defender who currently plays for Sportivo Ameliano.

== Career ==
Cabrera began his career with General Díaz in 2013, before moving on loan to Major League Soccer club FC Dallas on August 7, 2014.
