= Andrés Escobar (footballer, born 1991) =

Colombian footballer

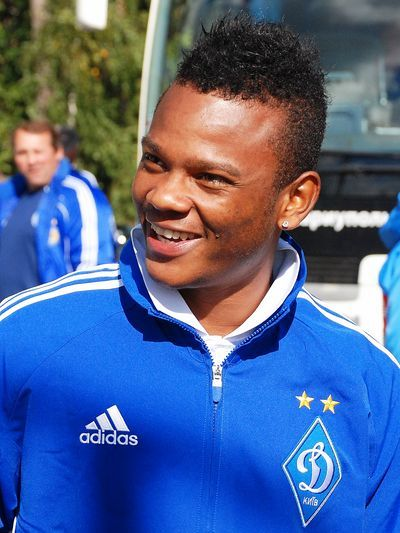

Personal information
- Full name: Andrés Ramiro Escobar Díaz
- Date of birth: 14 May 1991 (age 35)
- Place of birth: Puerto Tejada, Colombia
- Height: 1.68 m (5 ft 6 in)
- Positions: Second striker; winger

Youth career
- –2009: Deportivo Cali

Senior career*
Years	Team	Apps	(Gls)
2010–2011	Deportivo Cali	33	(4)
2011–2017	Dynamo Kyiv	0	(0)
2012–2013	→ Deportivo Cali (loan)	35	(5)
2013	→ Evian (loan)	5	(0)
2013	→ Evian II (loan)	2	(0)
2014	→ FC Dallas (loan)	26	(2)
2015	→ Atlético Nacional (loan)	12	(1)
2016	→ Millonarios (loan)	30	(6)
2017	→ Vasco da Gama (loan)	14	(2)
2018	Estudiantes (LP)	2	(0)
2018	Deportes Tolima	8	(0)
2019	FK Liepāja	0	(0)
2019	CSA	0	(0)
2020	Cúcuta Deportivo	4	(0)
2021	Leiknir Reykjavík	18	(2)
2024	Nueva Chicago	10	(0)

International career
2011	Colombia U20	12	(1)
Medal record
Colombia
Winner	Toulon Tournament	2011
- * Club domestic league appearances and goals as of 14:33, 30 December 2024 (UTC)

Andrés Ramiro Escobar Díaz (born 14 May 1991), nicknamed Manga, is a Colombian footballer and convicted rapist who played as a forward, most recently for Leiknir Reykjavík.

== Club career ==
=== Deportivo Cali ===
Escobar began his career in Categoría Primera A club, Deportivo Cali. He made his professional debut on 2 May 2010, in a 1–0 victory against Envigado, coming on as a 50th-minute substitute for Armando Carrillo. Escobar scored his first ever goal on 8 May, in the 38th minute in a 1–3 win against Deportivo Pereira. That same year he would score 5 goals in 6 matches in the 2010 Copa Colombia. He noticeably scored 2 goals in both legs of the final (1 goal per each match), in which Deportivo Cali defeated Itagüí with a global score of 3–0 therefore claiming the title.

=== Dynamo Kyiv ===
On 28 August 2011, it was announced that Ukrainian club Dynamo Kyiv purchased Escobar with an agreement of 5 years. Escobar officially debuted for the club on 21 September 2011, for the 2011–12 Ukrainian Cup, in a 3–2 away win against Kremin, coming on as a 73rd-minute substitute for Oleh Husyev. However, it is the only match that Escobar has played so far for the Ukrainian club.

=== Deportivo Cali ===
Escobar returned to Deportivo Cali for the 2012 season as a loan spell. Escobar scored 5 goals in 35 matches during the 2012 and 2013 season in Deportivo Cali. He made his way back to Dynamo Kyiv on 30 June 2013.

=== Évian ===
On 19 July, Escobar would be loaned to Ligue 1 club, Évian, club that would play the 2012–13 season.

=== FC Dallas ===
On 14 February 2014, Escobar officially signed for Major League Soccer side FC Dallas on loan from Dynamo Kyiv.

== International career ==
Escobar was called for the Colombia U20 squad for the 2011 South American U-20 Championship. He played 8 of the 9 matches that the team played in the competition and scored 1 goal, in the 37th minute of the 2–1 win against Bolivia U20.

He also was called for the 2011 Toulon Tournament. There he played 4 matches, but did not score any goals. Colombia was the champion of this tournament.

== Career statistics ==
=== Club ===
Club performance		League		Cup		Continental		Total	
Club	Season	Apps	Goals	Apps	Goals	Apps	Goals	Apps	Goals
Deportivo Cali	2008	0	0	1	1	—		1	1
Deportivo Cali	2009	0	0	—		—		0	0
Deportivo Cali	2010	18	2	6	5	—		24	7
Deportivo Cali	2011	15	2	0	0	—		15	2
Deportivo Cali	2012	14	3	1	0	—		15	3
Deportivo Cali	2013	21	2	1	0	—		22	2
Deportivo Cali	Total	68	9	9	6	0	0	77	15
Dynamo Kyiv	2011-12	0	0	1	0	—		1	0
Evian	2013-14	7	0	—		—		7	0
FC Dallas	2014	27	2	3	2	—		30	4
Atlético Nacional	2015	14	1	1	0	3	0	18	1
Millonarios	2016	30	6	6	1	—		36	7
Vasco da Gama	2017	18	2	1	0	—		19	2
Estudiantes (LP)	2018	2	0	—		1	0	3	0
FK Liepāja	2019	0	0	1	0	—		1	0
Deportes Tolima	2018	5	0	—		—		5	0
CSA	2019	11	2	—		—		11	2
Cúcuta Deportivo	2020	4	0	—		—		4	0
Leiknir Reykjavík	2021	16	2	1	0	—		16	2
Career total		223	24	23	9	4	0	250	33

=== International ===
==== International appearances ====
===== Under-20 =====
Team	Year	Apps	Goals
Colombia	2011	12	1
Total		12	1

==== International goals ====
===== Under-20 =====
International goals
No.	Date	Venue	Opponent	Score	Result	Competition
1	2011-01-26	Estadio Jorge Basadre, Tacna, Peru	Bolivia	2–0	2–1	2011 South American U-20 Championship

== Honours ==
=== Club ===
Deportivo Cali

- Copa Colombia (1): 2010

Dynamo Kyiv

- Premier League

Runner-up (1): 2011–12

=== International ===
Under-20

- Toulon Tournament (1): 2011

== Sexual abuse conviction ==
In March 2022, Escobar was convicted of raping a woman he met in Reykjavik. According to the court, Escobar took advantage of the woman's intoxicated state. In September 2022, Escobar received a two-and-a-half-year sentence.
