= Nick Walker (footballer) =

Trinidad and Tobago footballer

Nicholas Walker
Personal information
- Full name: Nicholas Walker
- Date of birth: 23 January 1990 (age 36)
- Place of birth: Port-of-Spain, Trinidad and Tobago
- Height: 1.90 m (6 ft 3 in)
- Position: Defender

College career
| Years | Team | Apps | (Gls) |
| 2010–2013 | Fairleigh Dickinson Knights | | |

Senior career*
| Years | Team | Apps | (Gls) |
| 2013 | Michigan Bucks | 12 | (0) |
| 2014 | FC Dallas | 1 | (0) |
| 2014 | → Puerto Rico Bayamón (loan) | | |
| 2017 | Nykøbing FC | | |
| 2017 | Michigan Bucks | 14 | (0) |
- * Club domestic league appearances and goals as of 11 April 2018

Nicholas Walker (born January 23, 1990) is a Trinidadian professional footballer.

== Career ==
=== Early career ===
Walker played four years of college soccer at Fairleigh Dickinson University between 2010 and 2013. Was a two-time all-North Atlantic region first team selection at Fairleigh Dickinson. Was also named 2013 Northeast Conference Defender of the Year as a senior. Walker started 69 of the 71 games he played as a four-year starter for the Knights. He finished his collegiate career with four goals.

Walker also made twelve appearances for USL PDL club Michigan Bucks in 2013.

=== FC Dallas ===
On January 21, 2014, Walker was drafted in the third round (43rd overall) of the 2014 MLS SuperDraft by FC Dallas. He signed with Dallas on March 19, 2014.

Walker made his professional debut on June 11, 2014 as an 87th-minute substitute in a 2-2 draw against Portland Timbers.

On August 6, 2014, Walker was loaned to Puerto Rican club Bayamón FC. He scored his first goal in a Concacaf Champions League match against Club America.

In December 2014, FC Dallas declined the option to sign Walker for the 2015 season.
