= David Texeira =

Uruguayan footballer (born 1991)

Personal information
- Full name: César David Texeira Torres
- Date of birth: 27 February 1991 (age 35)
- Place of birth: Salto, Uruguay
- Height: 1.83 m (6 ft 0 in)
- Position: Forward

Team information
- Current team: Dallas Sidekicks
- Number: 99

Youth career
- Defensor Sporting

Senior career*
Years	Team	Apps	(Gls)
2009–2011	Defensor Sporting	22	(6)
2011–2014	Groningen	65	(14)
2014–2015	FC Dallas	41	(10)
2016	Sivasspor	15	(2)
2016–2018	Vitória Guimarães	21	(5)
2018	AEL Limassol	11	(4)
2018–2020	Moreirense	19	(4)
2021–2022	Chattanooga Red Wolves	10	(2)
2024–	Dallas Sidekicks (indoor)	8	(7)

International career^{‡}
2010–2011	Uruguay U20	3	(0)
- * Club domestic league appearances and goals as of 27 November 2024 ‡ National team caps and goals as of 6 August 2011

César David Texeira Torres (born 27 February 1991) is a Uruguayan professional footballer who plays as a forward for the Dallas Sidekicks in the Major Arena Soccer League.

== Club career ==
=== Defensor Sporting ===
Texeira started his career playing with Defensor Sporting a top club in Uruguay, where he made his debut in the first team against Rampla Juniors on 30 February 2010.

=== FC Groningen ===
In August 2011, he was transferred to FC Groningen. He made his Eredivisie debut on 11 September 2011 against SC Heerenveen, and scored his first goal with the new club against AZ in the 2010–11 KNVB Cup. During the January transfer window, Texeira was heavily linked with a move to Liverpool, which would have seen him join up with national teammates Sebastián Coates and Luis Suárez. These rumours turned out to be false and Texeira stayed at Groningen. In the 2012–13 season, he played in midfield and ended the season with 29 appearances and five goals.

=== FC Dallas ===
Texeira was acquired by FC Dallas of Major League Soccer on 21 February 2014. He joined as a Designated Player, on an undisclosed contract. He made his debut on 16 March in a 1–1 draw at Sporting Kansas City, replacing Mauro Díaz for the last 12 minutes; he won the free kick that led to his team's late equaliser. In his first season, he scored four times as the team reached the Western Conference semi-finals, including two in a 3–1 home win against Seattle Sounders FC on 24 September.

In his second season, Texeira scored in home and away wins over the Houston Dynamo in the Texas derby, including two on 4 October 2015 in a 4–1 win at the Toyota Stadium. The team lost the Conference final to the Portland Timbers, with Texeira scoring once in the 5–3 aggregate loss.

=== Return to Europe ===
In January 2016, Texeira returned to European football by joining Sivasspor of the Turkish Süper Lig. Unemployed during the summer, he signed for Vitória S.C. of Portugal's Primeira Liga on 10 September. He was a 57th-minute substitute for Ghislain Konan in the 2017 Taça de Portugal Final, a 2–1 loss to S.L. Benfica.

After 25 games and six total goals for the team from Guimarães, Texeira was allowed to leave by manager Pedro Martins in January 2018 and headed for AEL Limassol in the Cypriot First Division. On 26 July that year he returned to the city, signing a two-year deal with Moreirense F.C. including the option of a third.

=== Return to the United States ===
On 24 September 2021, Texeira returned to the United States, joining third-tier USL League One side Chattanooga Red Wolves.

Texeira joined Major Arena Soccer League club Dallas Sidekicks in January 2024.

== International career ==
He has been capped by the Uruguay national under-20 football team for the 2011 FIFA U-20 World Cup.

== Career statistics ==
=== Club ===
As of match played 29 October 2022

Appearances and goals by club, season and competition
Club	Season	League			Cup		League Cup		Continental		Other		Total	
Club	Season	Division	Apps	Goals	Apps	Goals	Apps	Goals	Apps	Goals	Apps	Goals	Apps	Goals
Defensor Sporting	2009–10	Uruguayan Primera División	2	0	—		—		—		—		2	0
Defensor Sporting	2010–11	Uruguayan Primera División	18	6	—		—		1	0	—		19	6
Defensor Sporting	2011–12	Uruguayan Primera División	2	0	—		—		—		—		2	0
Defensor Sporting	Total		22	6	—		—		1	0	—		23	6
FC Groningen	2011–12	Eredivisie	30	8	1	1	—		—		—		31	9
FC Groningen	2012–13	Eredivisie	29	5	1	0	—		—		—		30	5
FC Groningen	2013–14	Eredivisie	6	1	—		—		—		—		6	1
FC Groningen	Total		65	14	2	1	—		—		—		67	15
FC Dallas	2014	Major League Soccer	19	4	1	0	—		—		2	0	22	4
FC Dallas	2015	Major League Soccer	22	6	2	2	—		—		4	1	28	9
FC Dallas	Total		41	10	3	2	—		—		6	1	50	13
Sivasspor	2015–16	Süper Lig	15	2	—		—		—		—		15	2
Vitória de Guimarães	2016–17	Primeira Liga	19	5	3	0	3	1	—		—		25	6
Vitória de Guimarães	2017–18	Primeira Liga	2	0	1	2	0	0	2	0	0	0	5	2
Vitória de Guimarães	Total		21	5	4	2	3	1	2	0	0	0	30	8
AEL	2017–18	Cypriot First Division	11	4	—		—		—		—		11	2
Moreirense	2018–19	Primeira Liga	17	4	3	2	1	0	—		—		21	6
Moreirense	2019–20	Primeira Liga	7	2	1	0	0	0	—		—		3	0
Moreirense	Total		19	4	4	2	1	0	—		—		24	6
Chattanooga Red Wolves	2021	USL League One	3	0	—		—		—		—		3	0
Chattanooga Red Wolves	2022	USL League One	7	2	0	0	—		—		2	0	9	2
Chattanooga Red Wolves	Total		10	2	0	0	—		—		2	0	12	2
Total			204	47	13	7	4	1	3	0	8	1	232	56

=== International goals ===
No.	Date	Venue	Opponent	Score	Result	Competition	Ref.
1.	7 July 2011	Estádio Brinco de Ouro da Princesa, Campinas, Brazil	Saudi Arabia	2–0	3–0	Friendly	
2.	11 July 2011	Complejo Uruguay Celeste, Canelones, Uruguay	Guatemala	3–0	7–0	Friendly	
3.	13 July 2011	Estadio Juan Antonio Lavalleja, Flores, Uruguay	Guatemala	1–0	2–0	Friendly	
