= 2020 Montreal Impact season =

Canadian Major League Soccer team

Montreal Impact
2020 season
- Owner: Joey Saputo
- President: Kevin Gilmore
- Head coach: Thierry Henry
- Stadium: Saputo Stadium; Red Bull Arena (Temporary)
- Major League Soccer: Conference: 9th Overall: 18th
- MLS Cup Playoffs: Play-in round
- CONCACAF Champions League: Quarter-finals
- MLS is Back Tournament: Round of 16
- Top goalscorer: League: Romell Quioto (8); All: Romell Quioto (10)
- Highest home attendance: 21,505 (February 26 vs. Saprissa)
- Lowest home attendance: 250 (August 25 vs. Vancouver Whitecaps FC) & (August 28 vs. Toronto FC)
- Average home league attendance: 7,169
- Biggest win: MTL 2–0 VAN (Aug. 25); VAN 2–4 MTL (Sept. 13)
- Biggest defeat: MTL 1–4 PHI (Sept. 20)
Home colours	Away colours

The 2020 Montreal Impact season was the club's 27th season of existence, and their ninth in Major League Soccer, the top tier of the American soccer pyramid. This was the last season as the Impact, as they are now known as Club de Foot Montréal.

Around September and towards the end of the season, COVID-19 cross-border restrictions imposed by the Canadian government forced Montreal Impact to play the remaining home matches at Red Bull Arena in Harrison, New Jersey.

== Squad ==
As of November 5, 2020:

No.	Name	Nationality	Position	Date of birth (age At Year End)	Previous club
Goalkeepers
23	Clément Diop	SEN	GK	October 12, 1993 (age 32)	(United States) LA Galaxy
40	Jonathan Sirois	CAN	GK	June 27, 2001 (age 24)	(Canada) Montreal Impact Academy
41	James Pantemis	CAN	GK	February 21, 1997 (age 29)	(Canada) Montreal Impact Academy
Defenders
4	Rudy Camacho	FRA	CB	March 5, 1991 (age 35)	(Belgium) Waasland-Beveren
5	Luis Binks	ENG	CB	September 2, 2001 (age 24)	(England) Tottenham Hotspur U-23
7	Rod Fanni	FRA	CB	December 6, 1981 (age 44)	(France) Marseille
12	Mustafa Kizza	UGA	LB	October 3, 1999 (age 26)	(Uganda) KCCA FC
15	Zachary Brault-Guillard	CAN	RB	December 30, 1998 (age 27)	(France) Lyon
16	Joel Waterman	CAN	CB	January 24, 1996 (age 30)	(Canada) Cavalry FC
22	Jukka Raitala	FIN	LB	September 15, 1988 (age 37)	(United States) Los Angeles FC
24	Karifa Yao	CAN	CB	September 20, 2000 (age 25)	(Canada) Montreal Impact Academy
26	Jorge Corrales	CUB	LB	May 20, 1991 (age 34)	(United States) Chicago Fire FC
27	Clément Bayiha	CAN	RB	March 8, 1999 (age 27)	(Canada) Ottawa Fury
33	Keesean Ferdinand	CAN	CB	August 17, 2003 (age 22)	(Canada) Montreal Impact Academy
Midfielders
2	Victor Wanyama	KEN	DM	June 25, 1991 (age 34)	(England) Tottenham Hotspur
6	Samuel Piette	CAN	DM	November 12, 1994 (age 31)	(Spain) CD Izarra
14	Amar Sejdič	BIH	AM	November 29, 1996 (age 29)	(United States) Maryland Terrapins
17	Ballou Tabla	CAN	AM	March 31, 1999 (age 27)	(Spain) Barcelona B
19	Steeven Saba	HAI	DM	February 24, 1993 (age 33)	(Haiti) Violette AC
25	Emanuel Maciel	ARG	CM	March 28, 1997 (age 29)	(Argentina) San Lorenzo
28	Shamit Shome	CAN	AM	September 5, 1997 (age 28)	(Canada) FC Edmonton
29	Mathieu Choinière	CAN	AM	February 7, 1999 (age 27)	(Canada) Montreal Impact Academy
34	Tomas Giraldo	CAN	AM	March 8, 2003 (age 23)	(Canada) Montreal Impact Academy
Attackers
9	Bojan Krkić	ESP	ST	August 28, 1990 (age 35)	(England) Stoke City
11	Anthony Jackson-Hamel	CAN	ST	August 3, 1993 (age 32)	(Canada) Montreal Impact Academy
13	Mason Toye	USA	FW	October 16, 1998 (age 27)	(United States) Minnesota United FC
18	Orji Okwonkwo	NGA	FW	January 19, 1998 (age 28)	(Italy) Bologna
21	Lassi Lappalainen	FIN	FW	August 24, 1998 (age 27)	(Italy) Bologna
30	Romell Quioto	HON	FW	August 9, 1991 (age 34)	(United States) Houston Dynamo
37	Maximiliano Urruti	ARG	FW	February 22, 1991 (age 35)	(United States) FC Dallas

=== International roster slots ===
Montreal currently has nine MLS International Roster Slots for use in the 2020 season. Montreal has eight slots allotted from the league and the team acquired three spots in trades with the Portland Timbers, D.C. United and Nashville SC. Montreal has also sold two slots to Orlando City SC and Philadelphia Union.

Montreal Impact International slots
Slot	Player	Nationality
1	Orji Okwonkwo	Nigeria
2	Rudy Camacho	France
3	Jukka Raitala	Finland
4	Bojan Krkić	Spain
5	Rod Fanni	France
6	Emanuel Maciel	Argentina
7	Luis Binks	England
8	Victor Wanyama	Kenya
9	Mustafa Kizza	Uganda
IR	Lassi Lappalainen	Finland

Foreign-Born Players with Domestic Status
Player	Nationality
Romell Quioto	Honduras ^{G}
Amar Sejdič	Bosnia and Herzegovina ^{G}
Maximiliano Urruti	Argentina ^{G}
Clément Diop	Senegal ^{G}
Jorge Corrales	Cuba ^{G}
Clément Bayiha	Cameroon / Canada
Ballou Tabla	Ivory Coast / Canada
Zachary Brault-Guillard	Haiti / Canada
Steeven Saba	Haiti / (United States) USA
Tomas Giraldo	Colombia / Canada

- (Canada) – Player is Canadian citizen;
- (United States) – Player is US citizen;
- G – Player has US green card;
- C – Player has permanent Canadian residency.

== Player movement ==
=== In ===
Per Major League Soccer and club policies terms of the deals do not get disclosed.

No.	Pos.	Player	Transferred from	Fee/notes	Date	Source
30	FW	(Honduras) Romell Quioto	(United States) Houston Dynamo	Traded for $100K GAM and Víctor Cabrera	November 20, 2019	
16	DF	(Canada) Joel Waterman	(Canada) Cavalry FC	Undisclosed Fee	January 14, 2020	
17	MF	(Canada) Ballou Tabla	(Spain) Barcelona B	Undisclosed Fee	January 15, 2020	
15	DF	(Canada) Zachary Brault-Guillard	(France) Lyon	Undisclosed Fee	January 25, 2020	
19	MF	(Haiti) Steeven Saba	(Haiti) Violette AC	Free Transfer	February 4, 2020	
25	MF	(Argentina) Emanuel Maciel	(Argentina) San Lorenzo	Free Transfer	February 11, 2020	
5	DF	(England) Luis Binks	(England) Tottenham Hotspur U-23	Free Transfer	February 18, 2020	
2	MF	(Kenya) Victor Wanyama	(England) Tottenham Hotspur	Free Transfer	March 3, 2020	
40	GK	(Canada) Jonathan Sirois	(Canada) Montreal Impact Academy	Signed from the academy	March 6, 2020	
33	DF	(Canada) Keesean Ferdinand	(Canada) Montreal Impact Academy	Signed from the academy	June 17, 2020	
34	MF	(Canada) Tomas Giraldo	(Canada) Montreal Impact Academy	Signed from the academy - Non-Roster	June 17, 2020	
12	DF	(Uganda) Mustafa Kizza	(Uganda) KCCA FC	Transfer Fee - Non-Roster	August 12, 2020	
13	FW	(United States) Mason Toye	(United States) Minnesota United FC	$600,000 in GAM	October 1, 2020	

=== Out ===
No.	Pos.	Player	Transferred to	Fee/notes	Date	Source
3	DF	(United States) Daniel Lovitz	(United States) Nashville SC	Traded for $50K TAM, $50K GAM and an International roster spot in 2020	November 19, 2019	
2	DF	(Argentina) Víctor Cabrera	(United States) Houston Dynamo	Traded with $100K GAM for Romell Quioto	November 20, 2019	
15	DF	(Canada) Thomas Meilleur-Giguère	(Canada) Pacific FC	Option declined	November 21, 2019	
40	GK	(Canada) Jason Beaulieu	(Canada) HFX Wanderers FC	Option declined	November 21, 2019	
25	DF	(Canada) Daniel Kinumbe	(Canada) HFX Wanderers FC	Option declined	November 21, 2019	
13	MF	(Japan) Ken Krolicki	(United States) Portland Timbers 2	Option declined	November 21, 2019	
16	MF	(Chile) Jeisson Vargas	(Chile) Unión La Calera	Option declined	November 21, 2019	
33	DF	(France) Bacary Sagna	Retired		November 21, 2019	
10	MF	(Argentina) Ignacio Piatti	(Argentina) San Lorenzo	Contract Terminated	February 10, 2020	
5	DF	(England) Luis Binks	(Italy) Bologna F.C. 1909	Transfer Fee	August 13, 2020	
1	GK	(United States) Evan Bush	(Canada) Vancouver Whitecaps FC	Traded for a 3rd Round Pick	September 28, 2020	
8	MF	(Algeria) Saphir Taïder	(Saudi Arabia) Al-Ain FC	Transfer Fee - $200,000	October 14, 2020	

=== Loans in ===
No.	Pos.	Player	Loaned from	Loan start date	Loan end date	Source
21	FW	(Finland) Lassi Lappalainen	(Italy) Bologna	November 21, 2019	December 31, 2020	
18	FW	(Nigeria) Orji Okwonkwo	(Italy) Bologna	January 24, 2020	December 31, 2020	
5	DF	(England) Luis Binks	(Italy) Bologna	August 13, 2020	August 13, 2020	
35	FW	(Canada) Jean-Aniel Assi	(Canada) Montreal Impact Academy	December 15, 2020	December 31, 2020	

=== Loans out ===
No.	Pos.	Player	Loaned to	Loan start date	Loan end date	Source
41	GK	(Canada) James Pantemis	(Canada) Valour FC	March 6, 2020	September 26, 2020	
12	DF	(Uganda) Mustafa Kizza	(Uganda) KCCA FC	August 12, 2020	October 15, 2020	
40	GK	(Canada) Jonathan Sirois	(Canada) Vancouver Whitecaps FC	July 22, 2020	July 23, 2020	

=== Draft picks ===
Round	No.	Pos.	Player	College/Club team	Transaction	Source
1(9)		MF	(United States) Jeremy Kelly	(United States) North Carolina	Trade to the Colorado Rapids for $75,000 in GAM	
3(56)	Passed					
3(60)	Passed					
3(61)	Passed					

== International caps ==
Players called for senior international duty during the 2020 season while under contract with the Montreal Impact.

Nationality	Position	Player	Competition	Date	Opponent	Minutes played	Score
Canada	MF	Samuel Piette	Friendly	January 7, 2020	v Barbados	57'	4–1
Canada	MF	Shamit Shome	Friendly	January 7, 2020	v Barbados	33'	4–1
Canada	MF	Samuel Piette	Friendly	January 10, 2020	v Barbados	46'	4–1
Canada	MF	Shamit Shome	Friendly	January 10, 2020	v Barbados	44'	4–1
Canada	MF	Samuel Piette	Friendly	January 15, 2020	v Iceland	90'	0–1
Finland	DF	Jukka Raitala	UEFA Nations League B group stage	October 11, 2020	v Bulgaria	90'	2–0
Finland	DF	Jukka Raitala	UEFA Nations League B group stage	October 14, 2020	v Ireland	4'	1–0
Kenya	MF	Victor Wanyama	2021 Africa Cup of Nations qualification	November 11, 2020	v Comoros	90'	1–1
Kenya	MF	Victor Wanyama	2021 Africa Cup of Nations qualification	November 15, 2020	v Comoros	90'	1–2

== Friendlies ==
=== Pre-season ===
Win Draw Loss

January 28 Preseason	Montreal Impact	3–1	D.C. United	Tampa, Florida
3:00 pm (EST)	Tabla 63', 84'; Quioto 78'	Report	Fawole 86'	Stadium: Corbett Soccer Stadium

February 5 Preseason	Montreal Impact	0–1	Philadelphia Union	Clearwater, Florida
7:00 pm (EST)	Bojan (yellow card) 16'	Report	Przybyłko (yellow card) 28', (goal) 57'; Martínez (yellow card) 89'	Stadium: Joe DiMaggio Sports Complex

February 8 Preseason	Orlando City SC	1–0	Montreal Impact	Orlando, Florida
6:00 pm (EST)	Nani 39'	Report		Stadium: Exploria Stadium

February 12 Preseason	Montreal Impact	0-1	Nashville SC	St. Petersburg, Florida
7:00 pm (EST)		Report	Dominique Badji 78'	Stadium: Al Lang Stadium

February 15 Preseason	Tampa Bay Rowdies	2–1	Montreal Impact	St. Petersburg, Florida
7:00 pm (EST)	Guenzatti 14', 66' (Mkosana)	Report	Quioto 90' (pen.)	Stadium: Al Lang Stadium

== Major League Soccer ==
=== Tables ===
==== Eastern Conference ====
Pos	Team	Pld	W	L	T	GF	GA	GD	Pts	PPG	Qualification
7	Nashville SC (Note: On June 10, 2020, Major League Soccer announced that Nashville SC would switch from the Western Conference to the Eastern Conference for the remainder of the 2020 season.)	23	8	7	8	24	22	+2	32	1.39	Qualification for the playoffs play-in round
8	New England Revolution	23	8	7	8	26	25	+1	32	1.39	Qualification for the playoffs play-in round
9	Montreal Impact (Note: Canadian clubs could not qualify for the 2021 CONCACAF Champions League through the MLS regular season or playoffs.)	23	8	13	2	33	43	−10	26	1.13	Qualification for the playoffs play-in round
10	Inter Miami CF	23	7	13	3	25	35	−10	24	1.04	Qualification for the playoffs play-in round
11	Chicago Fire FC	23	5	10	8	33	39	−6	23	1.00	

Source: MLS
Rules for classification: 1) points per game; 2) total wins per match played; 3) total goal differential per match played; 4) total goals scored per match played; 5) fewest disciplinary points per match played; 6) away goal differential per away match played; 7) away goals scored per away match played; 8) home goal differential per home match played; 9) home goals scored per home match played; 10) coin toss or drawing of lots.

==== MLS is Back – Group C ====
Group C results
Pos	Team	Pld	W	D	L	GF	GA	GD	Pts	Qualification
1	Toronto FC	3	1	2	0	6	5	+1	5	Advanced to knockout stage
2	New England Revolution	3	1	2	0	2	1	+1	5	Advanced to knockout stage
3	Montreal Impact	3	1	0	2	4	5	−1	3	Advanced to knockout stage
4	D.C. United	3	0	2	1	3	4	−1	2	

Source: MLS

==== Overall ====
2020 MLS overall standings
Pos	Team	Pld	W	L	T	GF	GA	GD	Pts	PPG
16	San Jose Earthquakes	23	8	9	6	35	51	−16	30	1.30
17	Vancouver Whitecaps FC	23	9	14	0	27	44	−17	27	1.17
18	Montreal Impact	23	8	13	2	33	43	−10	26	1.13
19	Inter Miami CF	23	7	13	3	25	35	−10	24	1.04
20	LA Galaxy	22	6	12	4	27	46	−19	22	1.00

Source: MLS
Rules for classification: 1) points per game; 2) total wins per match played; 3) total goal differential per match played; 4) total goals scored per match played; 5) fewest disciplinary points per match played; 6) away goal differential per away match played; 7) away goals scored per away match played; 8) home goal differential per home match played; 9) home goals scored per home match played; 10) coin toss or drawing of lots.

==== Results summary ====
Overall								Home						Away					
Pld	Pts	W	L	D	GF	GA	GD	W	L	D	GF	GA	GD	W	L	D	GF	GA	GD
2	4	1	0	1	4	3	+1	1	0	0	2	1	+1	0	0	1	2	2	0

Last updated: March 7, 2020
Source: 2020 Major League Soccer season
Pld = Matches played; Pts = Points; W = Matches won; D = Matches drawn; L = Matches lost; GF = Goals for; GA = Goals against; GD = Goal difference

==== Matches ====
Unless otherwise noted, all times in EST

February 29 1	Montreal Impact	2–1	New England Revolution	Montreal, Quebec
3:00 pm (EST)	Quioto 37'; Urruti 80'	Report	Bunbury 13'	Stadium: Olympic Stadium; Attendance: 21,006; Referee: Chris Penso

March 7 2	FC Dallas	2–2	Montreal Impact	Frisco, Texas
3:00 pm (EST)	Cannon (yellow card) 81'; Ondrášek 83'; Ziegler (yellow card) 85'; Pepi 90+6'	Report	Urruti 59', 68'	Stadium: Toyota Stadium; Attendance: 15,865; Referee: Victor Rivas

July 9 3 MLSiBT Group stage	Montreal Impact	0–1	New England Revolution	Bay Lake, Florida
20:00 EDT	Binks (yellow card) 72'	Report	Bou 56'; Mancienne (yellow card) 61'	Stadium: ESPN Wide World of Sports Complex; Attendance: 0 (Note: All matches in the MLS Is Back Tournament will be played behind closed doors due to the COVID-19 pandemic in Florida.); Referee: Guido Gonzalez

July 16 4 MLSiBT Group stage	Montreal Impact	3–4	Toronto FC	Bay Lake, Florida
20:00 EDT	Maciel (yellow card) 6'; Quioto 14'; Taïder 37' (pen.), 90+5' (pen.)	Report	Laryea 8'; Akinola 25', 37', 83'	Stadium: ESPN Wide World of Sports Complex; Attendance: 0 Referee: Jair Marrufo

July 21 5 MLSiBT Group stage	Montreal Impact	1–0	DC United	Bay Lake, Florida
20:00 EDT	Taïder 31'; Urruti (yellow card) 42'; Quioto (yellow card) 90+1'; Jackson-Hamel (yellow card) 90+4'	Report	Felipe (yellow card) 35'; Higuaín (yellow card) 90+2'	Stadium: ESPN Wide World of Sports Complex; Attendance: 0 Referee: Alex Chilowicz

July 25 MLSiBT Round of 16	Orlando City SC	1–0	Montreal Impact	Bay Lake, Florida
20:00 EDT	Akindele 60'; Moutinho (yellow card) 62'; Dike (yellow card) 90'	Report		Stadium: ESPN Wide World of Sports Complex; Attendance: Behind-closed-doors; Referee: Marcos de Oliveira

August 25 6	Montreal Impact	2–0	Vancouver Whitecaps FC	Montreal, Quebec
20:00 EDT	Quioto 18'; Lappalainen 40'; Jackson-Hamel (yellow card) 85'	Report	Cornelius (yellow card) 85'	Stadium: Stade Saputo; Attendance: 250; Referee: Drew Fischer

August 28 7	Montreal Impact	0–1	Toronto FC	Montreal, Quebec
8:00pm ET	Wanyama (yellow card) 57'; Camacho (yellow card) 68'	Report	Pozuelo 50' (pen.), (yellow card) 90+3'	Stadium: Saputo Stadium; Attendance: 250; Referee: David Gantar

September 1 8	Toronto FC	0–1	Montreal Impact	Toronto, Ontario
8:00pm ET	Pozuelo (penalty missed) 45+1', (yellow card) 59'	Report	Camacho 14', (yellow card) 45'; Brault-Guillard (yellow card) 46'; Wanyama (yellow card) 52'; Taïder (yellow card) 88'; Maciel (yellow card) 90+7'	Stadium: BMO Field; Attendance: 0 Referee: Drew Fischer

September 9 9	Montreal Impact	1–2	Toronto FC	Montreal, Quebec
8:00pm ET	Wanyama 53'	Report	Piatti 32'; Altidore 89'	Stadium: Saputo Stadium; Referee: David Gantar

September 13 10	Vancouver Whitecaps FC	2–4	Montreal Impact	Vancouver, British Columbia
9:30PM	Bair 7'; Cavallini (yellow card) 24' (yellow-red card) 57'; Camacho 66' (o.g.); Dájome (yellow card) 69'; Baldisimo (yellow card) 74'; Montero (yellow card) 86'	Report	Okwonkwo 15'; Taïder 45+1' (pen.); Piette 51'; Quioto 60'; Maciel (red card) 72'	Stadium: BC Place; Referee: Pierre-Luc Lauziere

September 16 11	Vancouver Whitecaps FC	3–1	Montreal Impact	Vancouver, British Columbia
9:30PM	Veselinović (yellow card) 31'; Montero 41' (pen.), 78'; Dájome 44'	Report	Camacho (red card) 37'; Piette (yellow card) 45+1'; Quioto 70'	Stadium: BC Place; Attendance: 0 Referee: Drew Fischer

September 20 12	Montreal Impact	1–4	Philadelphia Union	Harrison, New Jersey
7:00PM	Quioto 5', (red card) 16'	Box Score	Bedoya 22'; Blake (yellow card) 28'; Przybylko 45+3' 47'; Fontana 65'	Stadium: Red Bull Arena; Referee: Marcos de Oliveira

September 23 13	New England Revolution	3–1	Montreal Impact	Foxborough, Massachusetts
7:30PM	Farrell (yellow card) 41'; Kessler 45+2'; Bou 49'; Fagúndez 65'	Report	Binks (yellow card) 53'; Lappalainen 86'	Stadium: Gillette Stadium; Referee: Fotis Bazakos

September 27 14	New York Red Bulls	4–1	Montreal Impact	Harrison, New Jersey
7:00PM	Barlow 14', 35'; Royer 56'; Kaku 57'	Report	Bojan 4'; Binks (red card) 90'	Stadium: Red Bull Arena; Referee: Rosendo Mendoza

October 3 15	Montreal Impact	2–2	Chicago Fire FC	Harrison, New Jersey
6:30 PM	Lappalainen 22'; Urruti 67'; Brault-Guillard (yellow card) 75'; Piette (yellow card) 79'	Report	Berić 15'; Calvo 73'	Stadium: Red Bull Arena; Referee: Guido Gonzales, Jr.

October 7 16	Columbus Crew SC	1–2	Montreal Impact	Columbus, Ohio
7:30 PM EDT	Afful (yellow card) 24'; Zardes 45'	Report	Lappalainen 24'; Raitala (yellow card) 42'; Corrales (yellow card) 52'; Binks (yellow card) 54'; Bojan 74' (pen.)	Stadium: Mapfre Stadium; Attendance: 1,401; Referee: Victor Rivas

October 11 17	Philadelphia Union	2–1	Montreal Impact	Chester, Pennsylvania
7:30 p.m. EDT	Monteiro 39'; Santos 48'; Mbaizo (yellow card) 58'; Bedoya (yellow card) 76'; Real (yellow card) 90+3'	Report	Piette (yellow card) 55'; Wanyama (yellow card) 59'; Sejdič 65'; Corrales (yellow card) 71'	Stadium: Subaru Park; Referee: Ted Unkel

October 14 18	Montreal Impact	2–3	New England Revolution	Harrison, New Jersey
7:30 PM	Sejdič 27'; Binks (yellow card) 83'; Tabla 90+2'	Report	Manneh 13'; Bunbury 20'; Buksa 52', (yellow card) 57'; McNamara (yellow card) 87'	Stadium: Red Bull Arena; Referee: Joseph Dickerson

October 17 19	Montreal Impact	2–1	Inter Miami CF	Harrison, New Jersey
7:00 PM EDT	Bojan 6'; Urruti 80'; Waterman (yellow card) 90+4'	Report	Shea 33'; Sweat (yellow card) 45+1'; Pirez (yellow card) 69'	Stadium: Red Bull Arena; Referee: Timothy Ford

October 24 20	New York City FC	3–1	Montreal Impact	New York, New York
7:30 PM EDT	Tinnerholm (yellow card) 68'; Medina 68'; Moralez 83'; Rocha 86'; Matarrita (yellow card) 89'	Report	Quioto 89'	Stadium: Yankee Stadium; Referee: Ramy Touchan

October 27 21	Montreal Impact	0–1	Nashville SC	Harrison, New Jersey
7:00 PM EDT	Corrales (yellow card) 53'; Raitala (yellow card) 80'; Binks (yellow card) 90'	Report	Leal 33'; Zimmerman (yellow card) 45+3'	Stadium: Red Bull Arena; Referee: Ismail Elfath

November 1 22	Montreal Impact	0–1	Orlando City SC	Harrison, New Jersey
7:30 PM EST		Report	Dike 39'; Smith (yellow card) 51'	Stadium: Red Bull Arena; Referee: Robert Sibiga

November 8 23	D.C. United	2–3	Montreal Impact	Washington, D.C.
3:30 PM EST	Pines 9'; Kamara 33'	Report	Bojan 13'; Quioto (yellow card) 35', (goal) 88'; Sejdič (yellow card) 41'; Wanyama 74'; Piette (red card) 90+1'	Stadium: Audi Field; Attendance: 0 Referee: Rubiel Vazquez

==== MLS Cup Playoffs ====
November 20 Play-in Round	New England Revolution	2–1	Montreal Impact	Foxborough, Massachusetts
6:30 PM EST	Bou (yellow card) 6', (goal) 90+5'; McNamara (yellow card) 20'; Gil 38'	Report	Corrales (yellow card) 43'; Quioto 61'	Stadium: Gillette Stadium; Referee: Jair Marrufo

== Canadian Championship ==
=== Qualification ===
As part of the MLS regular season, Canada's three Major League Soccer clubs will play each other three times from August 18 to September 16. The team with the most points from this series will qualify for the Canadian Championship.

Pos	Team	Pld	W	D	L	GF	GA	GD	Pts	Qualification
1	Toronto FC	6	4	0	2	9	5	+4	12	2020 Canadian Championship and 2021 CONCACAF Champions League
2	Montreal Impact	6	3	0	3	9	8	+1	9	
3	Vancouver Whitecaps FC	6	2	0	4	8	13	−5	6	

Source: MLS
Rules for classification: 1) points; 2) total wins; 3) goal differential; 4) goals for; 5) away goal differential; 6) away goals for; 7) home goal differential; 8) home goals for 9) coin toss or drawing of lots.

== CONCACAF Champions League ==
=== Bracket ===
Round of 16
(Costa Rica) San Carlos	3	0	3
(United States) New York City FC	5	1	6
(El Salvador) Alianza	2	2	4
(Mexico) UANL	1	4	5
(Costa Rica) Saprissa	2	0	2
(Canada) Montreal Impact (a)	2	0	2
(Honduras) Olimpia (p)	2	2	4 (4)
(United States) Seattle Sounders FC	2	2	4 (2)
(Mexico) León	2	0	2
(United States) Los Angeles FC	0	3	3
(Jamaica) Portmore United	1	0	1
(Mexico) Cruz Azul	2	4	6
(Guatemala) Comunicaciones	1	1	2 (3)
(Mexico) América (p)	1	1	2 (5)
(Honduras) Motagua	1	0	1
(United States) Atlanta United FC	1	3	4

Quarter-finals
(United States) New York City FC	0	0	0
(Mexico) UANL	1	4	5
(Canada) Montreal Impact	1	1	2
(Honduras) Olimpia (a)	2	0	2
(United States) Los Angeles FC	2
(Mexico) Cruz Azul	1
(Mexico) América	3	0	3
(United States) Atlanta United FC	0	1	1

Semi-finals
(Mexico) UANL	3
(Honduras) Olimpia	0
(United States) Los Angeles FC	3
(Mexico) América	1

Final
(Mexico) UANL
(United States) Los Angeles FC

=== Matches ===
==== Round of 16 ====
February 19 First leg	Saprissa (Costa Rica)	2–2	(Canada) Montreal Impact	San José, Costa Rica
21:00	Torres (yellow card) 43'; Venegas 80'; A. Rodríguez 90'	Report	Okwonkwo 12'; Quioto 22'; Corrales (yellow card) 85'	Stadium: Estadio Ricardo Saprissa Aymá; Referee: Kimbell Ward (Saint Kitts and Nevis)

February 26 Second leg	Montreal Impact (Canada)	0–0 (2 (a) –2 agg.)	(Costa Rica) Saprissa	Montreal, Canada
20:00	Waterman (yellow card) 68'; Shome (yellow card) 89'	Report	Guzmán (yellow card) 20'; David (yellow card) 37'	Stadium: Olympic Stadium; Attendance: 21,505; Referee: Fernando Guerrero (Mexico)

==== Quarter-finals ====
March 10 First leg	Montreal Impact (Canada)	1–2	(Honduras) Olimpia	Montreal, Canada
20:00	Wanyama (yellow card) 34'; Taïder 47'	Report	Bengtson 15'; Núñez (yellow card) 24'; Benguché 41'; Leverón (yellow card) 70'	Stadium: Olympic Stadium; Referee: Adonai Escobedo González (Mexico)

December 15 Second leg	Olimpia (Honduras)	0–1 (2 (a) –2 agg.)	(Canada) Montreal Impact	Orlando, United States
20:00	Flores (yellow card) 74'	Report	Binks (yellow card) 26'; Kizza (yellow card) 42'; Quioto (yellow card) 52'; Sejdič 57'; Brault-Guillard (yellow card) 70'	Stadium: Exploria Stadium; Attendance: 0 Referee: Ricardo Montero (Costa Rica)
Note: Postponed due to the COVID-19 pandemic. The match was originally scheduled to take place at Estadio Olímpico Metropolitano, San Pedro Sula on March 17, 2020 (18:00 UTC−6).

== Statistics ==
=== Appearances, minutes played, and goals scored ===
No.	Nat.	Player	Total			Major League Soccer			MLS Cup Playoffs			CONCACAF CL			MLS is Back Knockout			Ref.
No.	Nat.	Player	App.	Min.	Gls	App.	Min.	Gls	App.	Min.	Gls	App.	Min.	Gls	App.	Min.	Gls	Ref.
Goalkeepers
23	(Senegal)	Clément Diop	26	2340	0	20	1800	0	1	90	0	4	360	0	1	90	0	
40	(Canada)	Jonathan Sirois	0	0	0	0	0	0	0	0	0	0	0	0	0	0	0	
41	(Canada)	James Pantemis	3	270	0	3	270	0	0	0	0	0	0	0	0	0	0	
Defenders
4	(France)	Rudy Camacho	17	1386	1	14	1189	1	1	90	0	2	107	0	0	0	0	
5	(England)	Luis Binks	26	2212	0	21	1762	0	1	90	0	3	270	0	1	90	0	
7	(France)	Rod Fanni	17	1379	0	12	947	0	1	90	0	3	270	0	1	72	0	
12	(Uganda)	Mustafa Kizza	3	154	0	1	19	0	1	45	0	1	90	0	0	0	0	
15	(Canada)	Zachary Brault-Guillard	27	2284	0	21	1789	0	1	90	0	4	315	0	1	90	0	
16	(Canada)	Joel Waterman	10	756	0	7	548	0	0	0	0	3	208	0	0	0	0	
22	(Finland)	Jukka Raitala	18	1530	0	15	1350	0	0	0	0	2	135	0	1	45	0	
24	(Canada)	Karifa Yao	2	127	0	2	127	0	0	0	0	0	0	0	0	0	0	
26	(Cuba)	Jorge Corrales	19	1474	0	14	1069	0	1	45	0	3	270	0	1	90	0	
33	(Canada)	Keesean Ferdinand	0	0	0	0	0	0	0	0	0	0	0	0	0	0	0	
Midfielders
2	(Kenya)	Victor Wanyama	24	2160	2	21	1890	2	0	0	0	2	180	0	1	90	0	
6	(Canada)	Samuel Piette	27	2383	1	22	1943	1	0	0	0	4	353	0	1	87	0	
14	(Bosnia and Herzegovina)	Amar Sejdič	18	1022	3	14	685	2	1	90	0	3	247	1	0	0	0	
17	(Canada)	Ballou Tabla	7	137	1	5	100	1	0	0	0	2	37	0	0	0	0	
19	(Haiti)	Steeven Saba	0	0	0	0	0	0	0	0	0	0	0	0	0	0	0	
25	(Argentina)	Emanuel Maciel	12	837	0	11	780	0	1	57	0	0	0	0	0	0	0	
27	(Canada)	Clément Bayiha	4	66	0	4	66	0	0	0	0	0	0	0	0	0	0	
28	(Canada)	Shamit Shome	13	372	0	12	282	0	0	0	0	1	90	0	0	0	0	
29	(Canada)	Mathieu Choinière	0	0	0	0	0	0	0	0	0	0	0	0	0	0	0	
34	(Canada)	Tomas Giraldo	0	0	0	0	0	0	0	0	0	0	0	0	0	0	0	
Forwards
9	(Spain)	Bojan Krkić	'20	1481	4	16	1159	4	1	90	0	2	168	0	1	64	0	
11	(Canada)	Anthony Jackson-Hamel	12	356	0	7	195	0	1	57	0	3	78	0	1	26	0	
13	(United States)	Mason Toye	8	241	0	6	152	0	1	33	0	1	56	0	0	0	0	
18	(Nigeria)	Orji Okwonkwo	18	729	2	13	488	1	1	33	0	3	163	1	1	45	0	
21	(Finland)	Lassi Lappalainen	14	697	4	13	679	4	0	0	0	0	0	0	1	18	0	
30	(Honduras)	Romell Quioto	25	1986	10	19	1483	8	1	90	1	4	323	1	1	90	0	
35	(Canada)	Jean-Aniel Assi	1	7	0	0	0	0	0	0	0	1	7	0	0	0	0	
37	(Argentina)	Maximiliano Urruti	18	1017	5	15	894	5	0	0	0	2	120	0	1	3	0	
No Longer with the Club
8	(Algeria)	Saphir Taïder	14	1158	5	11	955	4	0	0	0	2	113	1	1	90	0	
Last updated: December 16, 2020

=== Top scorers ===
Rank	Nat.	Player	Pos.	MLS	MLS Cup Playoffs	Champions League	TOTAL
1	(Honduras)	Romell Quioto	FW	8	1	1	10
2	(Argentina)	Maximiliano Urruti	FW	5			5
2	(Algeria)	Saphir Taïder	FW	4		1	5
4	(Finland)	Lassi Lappalainen	FW	4			4
4	(Spain)	Bojan Krkić	FW	4			4
6	(Bosnia and Herzegovina)	Amar Sejdič	MF	2		1	3
7	(Kenya)	Victor Wanyama	MF	2			2
7	(Nigeria)	Orji Okwonkwo	FW	1		1	2
9	(France)	Rudy Camacho	DF	1			1
9	(Canada)	Samuel Piette	MF	1			1
9	(Canada)	Ballou Tabla	MF	1			1
Totals				33	1	4	38

Updated to match played December 16, 2020
Source: Montreal Impact
Italic: denotes player left the club during the season.

=== Top assists ===
Rank	Nat.	Player	Pos.	MLS	MLS Cup Playoffs	Champions League	TOTAL
1	(Honduras)	Romell Quioto	FW	6			6
1	(Algeria)	Saphir Taïder	MF	6			6
3	(Argentina)	Emanuel Maciel	MF	3			3
3	(Kenya)	Victor Wanyama	MF	2		1	3
3	(Spain)	Bojan Krkić	FW	2		1	3
6	(Nigeria)	Orji Okwonkwo	FW	2			2
6	(Argentina)	Maximiliano Urruti	FW	2			2
8	(Canada)	Joel Waterman	DF	1			1
8	(Cuba)	Jorge Corrales	DF	1			1
8	(Finland)	Lassi Lappalainen	FW	1			1
8	(Canada)	Samuel Piette	MF	1			1
8	(Canada)	Zachary Brault-Guillard	DF	1			1
8	(United States)	Mason Toye	FW	1			1
8	(Uganda)	Mustafa Kizza	DF	1			1
8	(France)	Rudy Camacho	DF		1		1
8	(Bosnia and Herzegovina)	Amar Sejdič	MF		1		1
Totals				30	2	2	34

Updated to match played November 23, 2020
Source: Montreal Impact
Italic: denotes player left the club during the season.

=== Goals against average ===
No.	Nat.	Player	Total			Major League Soccer			MLS Cup Playoffs			Champions League			MLS is Back Knockout		
No.	Nat.	Player	MIN	GA	GAA	MIN	GA	GAA	MIN	GA	GAA	MIN	GA	GAA	MIN	GA	GAA
23	SEN	Clément Diop	2340	43	1.65	1800	36	1.80	90	2	2.00	360	4	1.00	90	1	1.00
40	CAN	Jonathan Sirois	0	0	0.00	0	0	0.00	0	0	0.00	0	0	0.00	0	0	0.00
41	CAN	James Pantemis	270	7	2.33	270	7	2.33	0	0	0.00	0	0	0.00	0	0	0.00

Updated to match played December 16, 2020
Source: Montreal Impact
Italic: denotes player left the club during the season.

=== Clean sheets ===
No.	Nat.	Player	MLS	MLS Cup Playoffs	Champions League	TOTAL
23	(Senegal)	Clément Diop	3		2	5
Totals			3	0	2	5

Updated to match played December 16, 2020
Source: MLSsoccer.com

=== Top minutes played ===
No.	Nat.	Player	Pos.	MLS	MLS Cup Playoffs	Champions League	MLS is Back Knockout	TOTAL
6	(Canada)	Samuel Piette	MF	1943		353	87	2383
23	(Senegal)	Clément Diop	GK	1800	90	360	90	2340
15	(Canada)	Zachary Brault-Guillard	DF	1789	90	315	90	2284
5	(England)	Luis Binks	DF	1762	90	270	90	2212
2	(Kenya)	Victor Wanyama	MF	1890		180	90	2160
30	(Honduras)	Romell Quioto	FW	1483	90	323	90	1986
22	(Finland)	Jukka Raitala	DF	1350		135	45	1530
9	(Spain)	Bojan	FW	1159	90	168	64	1481
26	(Cuba)	Jorge Corrales	DF	1069	45	270	90	1474
4	(France)	Rudy Camacho	DF	1189	90	107		1386

Updated to match played December 16, 2020
Source: Montreal Impact
Italic: denotes player left the club during the season.

=== Yellow and red cards ===
No.	Player	Total			Major League Soccer			MLS Cup Playoffs			Champions League			Ref.
No.	Player	Booked	(yellow card) (red card)	Sent off (straight red)	Booked	(yellow card) (red card)	Sent off (straight red)	Booked	(yellow card) (red card)	Sent off (straight red)	Booked	(yellow card) (red card)	Sent off (straight red)	Ref.
2	Victor Wanyama	4	0	0	3	0	0	0	0	0	1	0	0	
4	Rudy Camacho	2	0	1	2	0	1	0	0	0	0	0	0	
5	Luis Binks	8	0	1	7	0	1	0	0	0	1	0	0	
6	Samuel Piette	3	0	1	3	0	1	0	0	0	0	0	0	
7	Rod Fanni	0	0	0	0	0	0	0	0	0	0	0	0	
8	Saphir Taïder	1	0	0	1	0	0	0	0	0	0	0	0	
9	Bojan Krkić	0	0	0	0	0	0	0	0	0	0	0	0	
11	Anthony Jackson-Hamel	2	0	0	2	0	0	0	0	0	0	0	0	
12	Mustafa Kizza	1	0	0	0	0	0	0	0	0	1	0	0	
13	Mason Toye	0	0	0	0	0	0	0	0	0	0	0	0	
14	Amar Sejdič	1	0	0	1	0	0	0	0	0	0	0	0	
15	Zachary Brault-Guillard	3	0	0	2	0	0	0	0	0	1	0	0	
16	Joel Waterman	2	0	0	1	0	0	0	0	0	1	0	0	
17	Ballou Tabla	0	0	0	0	0	0	0	0	0	0	0	0	
18	Orji Okwonkwo	0	0	0	0	0	0	0	0	0	0	0	0	
19	Steeven Saba	0	0	0	0	0	0	0	0	0	0	0	0	
21	Lassi Lappalainen	0	0	0	0	0	0	0	0	0	0	0	0	
22	Jukka Raitala	2	0	0	2	0	0	0	0	0	0	0	0	
23	Clément Diop	0	0	0	0	0	0	0	0	0	0	0	0	
24	Karifa Yao	0	0	0	0	0	0	0	0	0	0	0	0	
25	Emanuel Maciel	2	0	1	2	0	1	0	0	0	0	0	0	
26	Jorge Corrales	4	0	0	3	0	0	1	0	0	1	0	0	
27	Clément Bayiha	0	0	0	0	0	0	0	0	0	0	0	0	
28	Shamit Shome	1	0	0	0	0	0	0	0	0	1	0	0	
29	Mathieu Choinière	0	0	0	0	0	0	0	0	0	0	0	0	
30	Romell Quioto	3	0	1	2	0	1	0	0	0	1	0	0	
33	Keesean Ferdinand	0	0	0	0	0	0	0	0	0	0	0	0	
34	Tomas Giraldo	0	0	0	0	0	0	0	0	0	0	0	0	
37	Maximiliano Urruti	1	0	0	1	0	0	0	0	0	0	0	0	
40	Jonathan Sirois	0	0	0	0	0	0	0	0	0	0	0	0	
41	James Pantemis	0	0	0	0	0	0	0	0	0	0	0	0	
Totals		41	0	5	32	0	5	1	0	0	8	0	0	
Last updated: December 16, 2020

== Recognition ==
=== Concacaf CL team of the Week ===
Week	Player	Nation	Position	Report
1	Clément Diop	Senegal	GK	Concacaf CL team of the Week: 1

=== MLS team of the Week ===
Week	Player	Nation	Position	Report
1	Urruti	Argentina	BN	MLS team of the Week: 1
8	Lappalainen	Finland	BN	MLS team of the Week: 8
9	Camacho	France	DF	MLS team of the Week: 9
9	Diop	Senegal	GK	MLS team of the Week: 9
11	Quioto	Honduras	BN	MLS team of the Week: 11
16	Bojan	Spain	FW	MLS team of the Week: 16
16	Henry	France	Coach	MLS team of the Week: 16
19	Bojan	Spain	FW	MLS team of the Week: 19
19	Henry	France	Coach	MLS team of the Week: 19
24	Quioto	Honduras	FW	MLS team of the Week: 24

=== MLS player of the Week ===
Week	Player	Nation	Position	Report
19	Bojan	Spain	FW	MLS player of the Week: 19

=== MLS goal of the Week ===
Week	Player	Nation	Position	Report
19	Bojan	Spain	FW	MLS goal of the Week: 19

=== MLS 22 Under 22 ===
Rank	Player	Nation	Position	Report
20	Zachary Brault-Guillard	Canada	DF	MLS 22 Under 22
11	Luis Binks	England	DF	MLS 22 Under 22
