= 2021 CF Montréal season =

Canadian Major League Soccer team

CF Montréal
2021 season
- Owner: Joey Saputo
- President: Kevin Gilmore
- Head coach: Wilfried Nancy
- Stadium: Saputo Stadium; DRV PNK Stadium (Temporary)
- Major League Soccer: Conference: 10th Overall: 18th
- MLS Cup Playoffs: Did not qualify
- Canadian Championship: Champions
- Top goalscorer: League: Romell Quioto (8); All: Romell Quioto (9)
- Biggest win: +2 goals (7 times): MTL 4–2 TOR (4/17) MIA 0–2 MTL (5/12) MTL 3–1 TOR (8/27) ORL 2–4 MTL (9/15) MTL 2–0 CHI (9/19) HFX 1–3 MTL (9/22, CC) MTL 2–0 HOU (11/3)
- Biggest defeat: MTL 1–4 NE (9/29)
Home colours	Away colours

The 2021 Club de Foot Montréal season was the club's 28th season of existence, and their tenth in Major League Soccer, the top tier of the American soccer pyramid. This was the first season under the club's new name, being known as the Montreal Impact up until this point.

Due to COVID-19 cross-border restrictions imposed by the Canadian government, CF Montréal along with two other Canadian MLS teams played home matches in the United States while also sharing stadiums with other American MLS teams. The team temporarily played home matches at Inter Miami CF's DRV PNK Stadium since the start of the season. During the 2021 CONCACAF Gold Cup qualification, in which DRV PNK Stadium became one of the hosting stadiums for the tournament, CF Montréal also played at other MLS Stadiums where it would not cause a conflict with the Gold Cup qualifier rounds. On July 14, MLS announced that CF Montréal were allowed to play one home matches on July 17 with FC Cincinnati although they will continue to work with the Canadian Government regarding plans on future home matches. On July 23, MLS announced that CF Montréal would be allowed to play home matches in Canada for August.

Outside of the MLS, CF Montréal won their 5th Canadian Championship after defeating rival, Toronto FC 1–0.

== Squad ==
As of September 10, 2021

No.	Name	Nationality	Position	Date of birth (age at year end)	Previous club
Goalkeepers
1	Sebastian Breza	CAN	GK	March 16, 1998 (age 28)	(Italy) Bologna
41	James Pantemis	CAN	GK	February 21, 1997 (age 29)	(Canada) Montreal Impact Academy
Defenders
3	Kamal Miller	CAN	CB	May 16, 1997 (age 29)	(United States) Austin FC
4	Rudy Camacho	FRA	CB	March 5, 1991 (age 35)	(Belgium) Waasland-Beveren
12	Mustafa Kizza	UGA	LB	October 3, 1999 (age 27)	(Uganda) KCCA FC
15	Zachary Brault-Guillard	CAN	RB	December 30, 1998 (age 27)	(France) Lyon
16	Joel Waterman	CAN	CB	January 24, 1996 (age 30)	(Canada) Cavalry FC
19	Zorhan Bassong	CAN	LB	May 7, 1999 (age 27)	(Belgium) Cercle Brugge
24	Aljaž Struna	SLO	CB	August 4, 1990 (age 36)	(United States) Houston Dynamo
26	Róbert Thorkelsson	ISL	CB	April 3, 2002 (age 24)	(Iceland) Breiðablik
27	Clément Bayiha	CAN	RB	March 8, 1999 (age 27)	(Canada) Ottawa Fury
Midfielders
2	Victor Wanyama	KEN	DM	June 25, 1991 (age 35)	(England) Tottenham Hotspur
6	Samuel Piette	CAN	DM	November 12, 1994 (age 31)	(Spain) CD Izarra
7	Ahmed Hamdy	EGY	CM	February 10, 1998 (age 28)	(Egypt) El Gouna FC
8	Djordje Mihailovic	USA	AM	November 10, 1998 (age 27)	(United States) Chicago Fire FC
11	Matko Miljevic	USA	AM	May 9, 2001 (age 25)	(Argentina) Argentinos Juniors
17	Ballou Tabla	CAN	AM	March 31, 1999 (age 27)	(Spain) Barcelona B
25	Emanuel Maciel	ARG	CM	March 28, 1997 (age 29)	(Argentina) San Lorenzo
28	Ismaël Koné	CAN	CM	June 6, 2002 (age 24)	(Canada) Saint-Laurent Soccer Club
29	Mathieu Choinière	CAN	AM	February 7, 1999 (age 27)	(Canada) Montreal Impact Academy
36	Nathan Saliba	CAN	CM	February 7, 2004 (age 22)	(Canada) Montreal Impact Academy
38	Rida Zouhir	CAN	CM	November 23, 2003 (age 22)	(Canada) Montreal Impact Academy
Attackers
9	Bjørn Johnsen	NOR	FW	November 6, 1991 (age 34)	(South Korea) Ulsan Hyundai
13	Mason Toye	USA	FW	October 16, 1998 (age 28)	(United States) Minnesota United FC
18	Joaquín Torres	ARG	FW	January 28, 1997 (age 29)	(Argentina) Newell's Old Boys
21	Lassi Lappalainen	FIN	FW	August 24, 1998 (age 28)	(Italy) Bologna
22	Sunusi Ibrahim	NGR	FW	October 1, 2002 (age 24)	(Nigeria) Nasarawa United F.C.
30	Romell Quioto	HON	FW	August 9, 1991 (age 35)	(United States) Houston Dynamo
35	Jean-Aniel Assi	CAN	FW	August 12, 2004 (age 22)	(Canada) Montreal Impact Academy

=== International roster slots ===
Montreal currently has ten MLS International Roster Slots for use in the 2021 season. Montreal has eight slots allotted from the league and the team acquired two spots in trades with D.C. United and the Houston Dynamo.

CF Montréal International slots
Slot	Player	Nationality
1	Rudy Camacho	France
2	Lassi Lappalainen	Finland
3	Emanuel Maciel	Argentina
4	Joaquín Torres	Argentina
5	Victor Wanyama	Kenya
6	Mustafa Kizza	Uganda
7	Ahmed Hamdy	Egypt
8	Sunusi Ibrahim	Nigeria
9	Aljaž Struna	Slovenia
10	Róbert Thorkelsson	Iceland

Foreign-Born Players with Domestic Status
Player	Nationality
Romell Quioto	Honduras ^{G}
Clément Diop	Senegal ^{G}
Bjørn Johnsen	Norway / (United States) USA
Matko Miljevic	Argentina / (United States) USA
Clément Bayiha	Cameroon / Canada
Ballou Tabla	Ivory Coast / Canada
Zachary Brault-Guillard	Haiti / Canada
Tomas Giraldo	Colombia / Canada
Zorhan Bassong	Belgium / Canada
Jean-Aniel Assi	Ivory Coast / Canada
Ismaël Koné	Ivory Coast / Canada

- (Canada) – Player is Canadian citizen;
- (United States) – Player is US citizen;
- G – Player has US green card;
- C – Player has permanent Canadian residency.

== Management ==
As of January 28, 2019

- Owner — (Canada) Joey Saputo
- President, chief executive officer — (Canada) Kevin Gilmore
- Sporting director — (Belgium) Olivier Renard
- Global sporting director — (Italy) Walter Sabatini
- Assistant sporting director — (Canada) Vassili Cremanzidis
- Director of academy — (Canada) Patrick Leduc

== Coaching staff ==
As of June 5, 2021

- (France) Wilfried Nancy – head coach
- (Republic of Ireland) Kwame Ampadu – assistant coach
- (Belgium) Laurent Ciman – assistant coach
- (Canada) Jason DiTullio – assistant coach
- (France) Romuald Peiser – goalkeeping coach
- (Canada) Jules Gueguen – fitness coach
- (France) Maxime Chalier - video analyst

== Player movement ==
=== In ===
Per Major League Soccer and club policies terms of the deals do not get disclosed.

No.	Pos.	Player	Transferred from	Fee/notes	Date	Source
19	DF	(Canada) Zorhan Bassong	(Belgium) Cercle Brugge	Free Transfer	December 1, 2020	
35	FW	(Canada) Jean-Aniel Assi	(Canada) Montreal Impact Academy	Signed from the academy	December 4, 2020	
36	MF	(Canada) Nathan Saliba	(Canada) Montreal Impact Academy	Signed from the academy	December 4, 2020	
38	MF	(Canada) Rida Zouhir	(Canada) Montreal Impact Academy	Signed from the academy	December 4, 2020	
39	MF	(Canada) Sean Rea	(Canada) Montreal Impact Academy	Signed from the academy	December 4, 2020	
3	DF	(Canada) Kamal Miller	(United States) Austin FC	$225K in GAM	December 15, 2020	
8	MF	(United States) Djordje Mihailovic	(United States) Chicago Fire FC	$800K in GAM	December 16, 2020	
22	FW	(Nigeria) Sunusi Ibrahim	(Nigeria) Nasarawa United F.C.	Free Transfer	January 12, 2021	
24	DF	(Slovenia) Aljaž Struna	(United States) Houston Dynamo FC	Traded with Int spot for Maximiliano Urruti	January 18, 2021	
9	FW	(Norway) Bjørn Johnsen	(South Korea) Ulsan Hyundai	Signed with Allocation Money	February 3, 2021	
11	FW	(United States) Erik Hurtado	(United States) Sporting Kansas City	Free Transfer	February 16, 2021	
26	DF	(Iceland) Róbert Thorkelsson	(Iceland) Breiðablik	Free Transfer	June 27, 2021	
28	MF	(Canada) Ismaël Koné	(Canada) Saint-Laurent Soccer Club	Free Transfer	August 13, 2021	
11	MF	(United States) Matko Miljevic	(Argentina) Argentinos Juniors	Free Transfer	August 20, 2021	

=== Out ===
No.	Pos.	Player	Transferred to	Fee/notes	Date	Source
11	FW	(Canada) Anthony Jackson-Hamel	Retired		November 27, 2020	
9	FW	(Spain) Bojan	(Japan) Vissel Kobe	Option declined	November 27, 2020	
19	MF	(Haiti) Steeven Saba	(Haiti) Violette AC	Option declined	November 27, 2020	
28	MF	(Canada) Shamit Shome	(Canada) FC Edmonton	Option declined	November 27, 2020	
7	DF	(France) Rod Fanni	Retired		November 27, 2020	
22	DF	(Finland) Jukka Raitala	(United States) Minnesota United FC	Out of contract	November 27, 2020	
26	DF	(Cuba) Jorge Corrales	(United States) FC Tulsa	Out of contract	November 27, 2020	
37	FW	(Argentina) Maximiliano Urruti	(United States) Houston Dynamo FC	Traded for Aljaž Struna & Int Roster spot	January 18, 2021	
14	MF	(Bosnia and Herzegovina) Amar Sejdič	(United States) Atlanta United FC	Traded for 150k in GAM	July 6, 2021	
11	FW	(United States) Erik Hurtado	(United States) Columbus Crew	Traded for 200k in GAM	July 8, 2021	
23	GK	(Senegal) Clément Diop	(United States) Inter Miami CF	Released	August 17, 2021	

=== Loans in ===
No.	Pos.	Player	Loaned from	Loan start date	Loan end date	Source
21	FW	(Finland) Lassi Lappalainen	(Italy) Bologna	November 4, 2020	December 31, 2021	
5	DF	(England) Luis Binks	(Italy) Bologna	November 11, 2020	July 1, 2021	
18	FW	(Argentina) Joaquín Torres	(Argentina) Newell's Old Boys	February 4, 2021	December 31, 2021	
7	MF	(Egypt) Ahmed Hamdy	(Egypt) El Gouna FC	February 4, 2021	December 31, 2021	
1	GK	(Canada) Sebastian Breza	(Italy) Bologna	April 6, 2021	December 31, 2021	

=== Loans out ===
No.	Pos.	Player	Loaned to	Loan start date	Loan end date	Source
24	DF	(Canada) Karifa Yao	(Canada) Cavalry FC	February 3, 2021	December 31, 2021	
33	DF	(Canada) Keesean Ferdinand	(Canada) Atlético Ottawa	February 3, 2021	December 31, 2021	
34	MF	(Canada) Tomas Giraldo	(Canada) FC Edmonton	February 12, 2021	December 31, 2021	
40	GK	(Canada) Jonathan Sirois	(Canada) Valour FC	April 6, 2021	December 31, 2021	
39	MF	(Canada) Sean Rea	(Canada) Valour FC	April 6, 2021	December 31, 2021	

=== Draft picks ===
Round	No.	Pos.	Player	College/Club team	Transaction	Source
3(63)		MD	(United States) Giuseppe Barone	(United States) Michigan State Spartans		
3(65)	Passed					

== International caps ==
Players called for senior international duty during the 2021 season while under contract with the CF Montréal.

Nationality	Position	Player	Competition	Date	Opponent	Minutes played	Score
Canada	DF	Kamal Miller	2022 FIFA World Cup qualification	March 25, 2021	v Bermuda	90'	5–1
Canada	MF	Samuel Piette	2022 FIFA World Cup qualification	March 25, 2021	v Bermuda	13'	5–1
Uganda	DF	Mustafa Kizza	2021 AFCON qualification	March 29, 2021	v Malawi	90'	0–1
Canada	MF	Samuel Piette	2022 FIFA World Cup qualification	March 29, 2021	v Cayman Islands	68'	11–0
Canada	DF	Zachary Brault-Guillard	2022 FIFA World Cup qualification	June 5, 2021	v Aruba	56'	7–0
Canada	MF	Samuel Piette	2022 FIFA World Cup qualification	June 8, 2021	v Suriname	90'	4–0
Uganda	DF	Mustafa Kizza	Friendly	June 10, 2021	v South Africa	90'	2–3
Canada	MF	Samuel Piette	2022 FIFA World Cup qualification	June 12, 2021	v Haiti	8'	1–0
Finland	FW	Lassi Lappalainen	Euro 2020	June 16, 2021	v Russia	15'	0–1
Nigeria	FW	Sunusi Ibrahim	Friendly	July 3, 2021	v Mexico	90'	0–4
Canada	MF	Samuel Piette	Gold Cup group stage	July 11, 2021	v Martinique	27'	4–1
Canada	DF	Kamal Miller	Gold Cup group stage	July 11, 2021	v Martinique	77'	4–1
Honduras	FW	Romell Quioto	Gold Cup group stage	July 13, 2021	v Grenada	27'	4–0
Canada	MF	Samuel Piette	Gold Cup group stage	July 15, 2021	v Haiti	27'	4–1
Canada	DF	Kamal Miller	Gold Cup group stage	July 15, 2021	v Haiti	90'	4–1
Honduras	FW	Romell Quioto	Gold Cup group stage	July 17, 2021	v Panama	71'	3–2
Canada	MF	Samuel Piette	Gold Cup group stage	July 18, 2021	v USA	73'	0–1
Canada	DF	Kamal Miller	Gold Cup group stage	July 18, 2021	v USA	90'	0–1
Honduras	FW	Romell Quioto	Gold Cup group stage	July 20, 2021	v Qatar	26'	0–2
Canada	MF	Samuel Piette	Gold Cup quarter-finals	July 25, 2021	v Costa Rica	20'	2-0
Canada	DF	Kamal Miller	Gold Cup quarter-finals	July 25, 2021	v Costa Rica	90'	2-0
Canada	DF	Kamal Miller	Gold Cup Semi-finals	July 29, 2021	v Mexico	90'	1-2
Canada	DF	Kamal Miller	2022 FIFA World Cup qualification	September 2, 2021	v Honduras	84'	1-1
Honduras	FW	Romell Quioto	2022 FIFA World Cup qualification	September 2, 2021	v Canada	49'	1-1
Uganda	DF	Mustafa Kizza	2022 FIFA World Cup qualification	September 2, 2021	v Kenya	23'	0–0
Canada	DF	Kamal Miller	2022 FIFA World Cup qualification	September 5, 2021	v USA	32'	1-1
Honduras	FW	Romell Quioto	2022 FIFA World Cup qualification	September 5, 2021	v El Salvador	45'	0-0
Uganda	DF	Mustafa Kizza	2022 FIFA World Cup qualification	September 6, 2021	v Mali	21'	0–0
Honduras	FW	Romell Quioto	2022 FIFA World Cup qualification	September 8, 2021	v USA	45'	1-4
Canada	DF	Kamal Miller	2022 FIFA World Cup qualification	September 8, 2021	v El Salvador	90'	3-0
Canada	MF	Samuel Piette	2022 FIFA World Cup qualification	September 8, 2021	v El Salvador	11'	3-0
Canada	DF	Kamal Miller	2022 FIFA World Cup qualification	October 7, 2021	v Mexico	90'	1-1
Uganda	DF	Mustafa Kizza	2022 FIFA World Cup qualification	October 7, 2021	v Rwanda	1'	1–0
Uganda	DF	Mustafa Kizza	2022 FIFA World Cup qualification	October 10, 2021	v Rwanda	31'	1–0
Canada	MF	Samuel Piette	2022 FIFA World Cup qualification	October 10, 2021	v Jamaica	89'	0-0
Canada	DF	Kamal Miller	2022 FIFA World Cup qualification	October 14, 2021	v Panama	90'	4-1
Canada	MF	Samuel Piette	2022 FIFA World Cup qualification	October 14, 2021	v Panama	9'	4-1
Canada	DF	Kamal Miller	2022 FIFA World Cup qualification	November 12, 2021	v Costa Rica	90'	1-0
Canada	DF	Kamal Miller	2022 FIFA World Cup qualification	November 16, 2021	v Mexico	90'	2-1
Honduras	FW	Romell Quioto	2022 FIFA World Cup qualification	November 16, 2021	v Costa Rica	90'	1-2

== Friendlies ==
=== Pre-season ===
Unless otherwise noted, all times in EST

April 8	Tormenta FC	2–0	CF Montréal	St. Petersburg, Florida
11:00 am (EST)				Stadium: Al Lang Stadium

April 11	Tampa Bay Rowdies	1–5	CF Montréal	St. Petersburg, Florida
6:00 pm (EST)	Dos Santos 89'		Mihailovic 10'; Toye 12' 40'; Quioto 45'; Sejdič 64'; (red card) 73'	Stadium: Al Lang Stadium

Win Draw Loss

== Major League Soccer ==
=== Tables ===
==== Eastern Conference ====
Pos	Team	Pld	W	L	T	GF	GA	GD	Pts	Qualification
8	D.C. United	34	14	15	5	56	54	+2	47	
9	Columbus Crew	34	13	13	8	46	45	+1	47	
10	CF Montréal (Note: Canadian clubs could not qualify for the 2022 CONCACAF Champions League through the MLS regular season or playoffs.)	34	12	12	10	46	44	+2	46	Qualification for the CONCACAF Champions League (Note: As 2021 Canadian Championship winners)
11	Inter Miami CF	34	12	17	5	36	53	−17	41	
12	Chicago Fire FC	34	9	18	7	36	54	−18	34	

Source: MLS
Rules for classification: 1) points; 2) total wins; 3) total goal differential; 4) total goals scored; 5) fewer disciplinary points; 6) away goal differential; 7) away goals scored; 8) home goals differential; 9) home goals scored; 10) coin toss (2 clubs tied) or drawing of lots (≥3 clubs tied)

==== Overall ====
Pos	Team	Pld	W	L	T	GF	GA	GD	Pts	
16	D.C. United	34	14	15	5	56	54	+2	47	
17	Columbus Crew	34	13	13	8	46	45	+1	47	
18	CF Montréal (V)	34	12	12	10	46	44	+2	46	Qualification for the CONCACAF Champions League (Note: As 2021 Canadian Championship winners (CAN1))
19	Los Angeles FC	34	12	13	9	53	51	+2	45	
20	Inter Miami CF	34	12	17	5	36	53	−17	41	

Source: MLS
Rules for classification: 1) points; 2) total wins; 3) total goal differential; 4) total goals scored; 5) fewer disciplinary points; 6) away goal differential; 7) away goals scored; 8) home goals differential; 9) home goals scored; 10) coin toss (2 clubs tied) or drawing of lots (≥3 clubs tied)
(V) Canadian Championship winners

==== Results summary ====
Overall								Home						Away					
Pld	Pts	W	L	D	GF	GA	GD	W	L	D	GF	GA	GD	W	L	D	GF	GA	GD
34	46	12	12	10	46	44	+2	9	4	4	29	23	+6	3	8	6	17	21	−4

Last updated: November 8, 2021
Source: 2021 Major League Soccer season
Pld = Matches played; Pts = Points; W = Matches won; D = Matches drawn; L = Matches lost; GF = Goals for; GA = Goals against; GD = Goal difference

==== Matches ====
Unless otherwise noted, all times in Eastern Time

April 17 1	CF Montréal	4–2	Toronto FC	Fort Lauderdale, Florida
2:00 pm (EDT)	Toye 3'; Quioto 24'; Wanyama 54', (yellow card) 67'; Mihailovic 71'	Report	Bradley (yellow card) 19'; Delgado 45' (pen.); Priso (yellow card) 45+1'; Laryea 88'	Stadium: DRV PNK Stadium; Attendance: 0 Referee: Ismail Elfath

April 24 2	Nashville SC	2–2	CF Montréal	Nashville, Tennessee
2:00 pm (EDT)	Godoy (yellow card) 50'; Cádiz 54'; Muyl (yellow card) 56'; Mukhtar 77'	Report	Piette (yellow card) 2'; Toye 13'; Brault-Guillard 42'; Quioto (yellow card) 48'; Struna (yellow card) 63'	Stadium: Nissan Stadium; Attendance: 12,164; Referee: Nima Saghafi

May 1 3	CF Montréal	0–0	Columbus Crew SC	Fort Lauderdale, Florida
3:00 pm (EDT)		Report		Stadium: DRV PNK Stadium; Attendance: 0 Referee: Timothy Ford

May 8 4	Vancouver Whitecaps FC	2–0	CF Montréal	Sandy, Utah
3:00 pm (EDT)	Caicedo (yellow card) 32'; Veselinović (yellow card) 38'; Cavallini (yellow card) 45'; CDájome 57' (pen.), 71'; Owusu (yellow card) 82'	Report	Mihailovic (yellow card) 24'	Stadium: Rio Tinto Stadium; Attendance: 0 Referee: Rosendo Mendoza

May 12 5	Inter Miami CF	0–2	CF Montréal	Fort Lauderdale, Florida
7:30 pm (EDT)	González Pírez (yellow card) 7'; G. Higuain (yellow card) 60'; F. Higuain (yellow card) 88'	Report	Johnsen 14', 25'; Miller (yellow card) 33'; Struna (yellow card) 82'	Stadium: DRV PNK Stadium; Referee: Guido Gonzales Jr.

May 15 6	Atlanta United FC	1–0	CF Montréal	Atlanta, Georgia
7:00 pm (EDT)	Sosa (yellow card) 17'; Moreno 90+4'	Report	Camacho (yellow card) 19'; Wanyama (yellow card) 29'; Struna (yellow card) 90'	Stadium: Mercedes-Benz Stadium; Attendance: 40,116; Referee: Silviu Petrescu

May 22 7	CF Montréal	1–2	FC Cincinnati	Fort Lauderdale, Florida
1:00 pm (EDT)	Mihailovic (yellow card) 35' (goal) 56'; Brault-Guillard (yellow card) 43'; Quioto (yellow card) 54'; Wanyama (yellow card) 89'	Report	Locadia 70'; Vallecilla 86'	Stadium: DRV PNK Stadium; Attendance: unknown Referee: Fotis Bazakos

May 29 8	Chicago Fire FC	0–1	CF Montréal	Chicago, Illinois
1:00 pm (EDT)		Report	Camacho (yellow card) 17'; Wanyama (yellow card) 62'; Toye 87'	Stadium: Soldier Field; Attendance: 6,680; Referee: Victor Rivas

June 23 9	CF Montréal	0–0	D.C. United	Fort Lauderdale, Florida
8:00 pm (EDT)	Piette (yellow card) 19'; Bassong (yellow card) 35' (yellow-red card) 45'; Diop (yellow card) 87'; Wanyama (yellow card) 90+5'	Report	Paredes (yellow card) 59'; Najar (yellow card) 63'; Nyeman (yellow card) 71'	Stadium: DRV PNK Stadium; Attendance: 0 Referee: Drew Fischer

June 26 10	Nashville SC	1–1	CF Montréal	Nashville, Tennessee
8:30 pm (EDT)	Lovitz (yellow card) 89'; Danladi 90+4'		Camacho (yellow card) 33'; Toye (yellow card) 42'; Struna 63'; Miller (yellow card) 84'	Stadium: Nissan Stadium; Attendance: 22,523; Referee: Jon Freemon

July 3 11	CF Montréal	1–0	Inter Miami CF	Harrison, New Jersey
7:30 pm (EDT)	Wanyama (yellow card) 14'; Choinière 41'; Struna (yellow card) 54'; Camacho (yellow card) 58'	Report	Pírez (yellow card) 71'; Leerdam (yellow card) 73'; Silva (yellow card) 76'	Stadium: Red Bull Arena; Referee: Rosendo Mendoza
Note: The match was played at Red Bull Arena due to scheduling conflicts with the 2021 CONCACAF Gold Cup qualification.

July 7 12	CF Montréal	2–1	New York City FC	Orlando, Florida
7:30 pm (EDT)	Toye 43'; Brault-Guillard (yellow card) 57'	Report	Parks 29'; Ibeagha (yellow card) 70'; Moralez (yellow card) 77'	Stadium: Exploria Stadium; Attendance: 0 Referee: Marcos de Oliveira
Note: The match was played at Exploria Stadium due to scheduling conflicts with the 2021 CONCACAF Gold Cup qualification.

July 17 13	CF Montréal	5–4	FC Cincinnati	Montreal, Quebec
7:30 pm (EDT)	Toye 21' 72' (pen.); Torres 34'; Waterman (yellow card) 41'; Hafez 74' 87'; Brault-Guillard (yellow card) 90'	Report	Medunjanin 6'; Brenner 14' (yellow card) 45+1' (goal) 46'; Kubo (yellow card) 28'; Vallecilla (yellow card) 31' (goal) 42'; Vermeer (yellow card) 67'; Acosta (yellow card) 84'	Stadium: Saputo Stadium; Referee: Silviu Petrescu

July 21 14	New York City FC	1–0	CF Montréal	Harrison, New Jersey
7:30 pm (EDT)	Tajouri-Shradi 29'; Chanot (yellow card) 62'	Report	Waterman (yellow card) 42'; Hamdi (yellow card) 76'	Stadium: Red Bull Arena; Attendance: 2,873; Referee: Ted Unkel
Note: The match will be played at Red Bull Arena due to scheduling conflicts at New York City FC's home stadium, Yankee Stadium. New York City FC will play as the home team for this match.

July 25 15	New England Revolution	2–1	CF Montréal	Foxborough, Massachusetts
6:00 pm (EDT)	Bou 29', 73'	Report	Mihailovic 79'	Stadium: Gillette Stadium; Attendance: 18,217; Referee: Alex Chilowicz

July 31 16	Inter Miami CF	2–1	CF Montréal	Fort Lauderdale, Florida
8:00 PM (EDT)	G. Higuaín 49' (pen.), 69'; Pírez (yellow card) 54'; Silva (yellow card) 77'	Report	Wanyama (yellow card) 17'; Torres 20'	Stadium: DRV PNK Stadium; Attendance: 14,303; Referee: Victor Rivas

August 4 17	CF Montréal	2–2	Atlanta United FC	Montreal, Quebec
7:30 pm (EDT)	Struna (yellow card) 19'; Toye 53'; Camacho 63', (red card) 73'; Wanyama (red card) 82'; Mihailovic (yellow card) 85'	Report	Campbell (yellow card) 27'; Martínez 65', (red card) 82'; Moreno 76' (pen.), (yellow card) 90+6'; Damm (yellow card) 90'	Stadium: Saputo Stadium; Attendance: 11,000; Referee: David Gantar

August 8 18	D.C. United	2–1	CF Montréal	Washington, D.C.
8:00 pm (EDT)	Najar 40'; Kamara 57'	Report	Waterman (yellow card) 3'; Brault-Guillard 16'; Miller (yellow card) 57'	Stadium: Audi Field; Attendance: 14,169; Referee: Marcos de Oliveira

August 14 19	CF Montréal	2–1	New York Red Bulls	Montreal, Quebec
8:00 pm (EDT)	Ibrahim 71'; Wanyama 90+8'; Brault-Guillard (yellow card) 90+12'	Report	Klimala 45+5' (pen.); Tarek (yellow card) 53'; Yearwood (yellow card) 89'; Duncan (yellow card) 90+5'; Coronel (yellow card) 90+7'	Stadium: Saputo Stadium; Referee: Allen Chapman

August 18 20	FC Cincinnati	0–0	CF Montréal	Cincinnati, Ohio
7:30 pm (EDT)	Cruz (yellow card) 36'; Matarrita (yellow card) 62'; Acosta (yellow card) 89'; Brenner (yellow card) 90+4'	Report	Maciel (yellow card) 22'; Choinière (yellow card) 26'; Camacho (yellow card) 68' (yellow-red card) 74'	Stadium: West End Stadium; Attendance: 21,115; Referee: Ramy Touchan

August 21 21	Philadelphia Union	1–1	CF Montréal	Chester, Pennsylvania
7:30 pm (EDT)	Mbaizo (yellow card) 3'; Monteiro (yellow card) 6'; Sullivan 87'	Report	Choinière (yellow card) 44'; Mihailovic 45+1'; Miller (yellow card) 68'; Breza (yellow card) 90+4'; Kizza (yellow card) 90+5'	Stadium: Subaru Park; Attendance: 14,794; Referee: Chris Penso

August 27 22	CF Montréal	3–1	Toronto FC	Montreal, Quebec
7:30 pm (EDT)	Struna (yellow card) 9'; Piette 23', (yellow card) 34'; Camacho (yellow card) 47'; Torres 68'; Quioto 75'	Report	Okello (red card) 5'; Achara 58'; Lawrence (yellow card) 60'; Gonzalez (yellow card) 74'	Stadium: Saputo Stadium; Referee: Drew Fischer

September 11 23	CF Montréal	0–1	Nashville SC	Montreal, Quebec
8:00 pm (EDT)	Bassong (yellow card) 44'	Report	Mukhtar (yellow card) 41'; Anunga (yellow card) 58'; Zimmerman 66'; Willis (yellow card) 85'	Stadium: Saputo Stadium; Referee: Silviu Petrescu

September 15 24	Orlando City SC	2–4	CF Montréal	Orlando, Florida
7:30 pm (EDT)	Nani (yellow card) 28' (yellow-red card) 35'; Jansson 40'; Ruan 63'; Perea (red card) 83'	Report	Choinière 18'; Quioto 37'; Wanyama (yellow card) 39'; Waterman (yellow card) 72'; Lappalainen 73'; Ibrahim 80'	Stadium: Exploria Stadium; Attendance: 14,133; Referee: Rubiel Vazquez

September 19 25	CF Montréal	2–0	Chicago Fire FC	Montreal, Quebec
1:00 pm (EDT)	Quioto 60'; Terán 80' (o.g.)	Report	Stojanović (yellow card) 39'; Terán (yellow card) 49'	Stadium: Saputo Stadium; Referee: Marcos de Oliveira

September 25 26	Columbus Crew	2–1	CF Montréal	Columbus, Ohio
7:30 pm (EDT)	Williams (yellow card) 39'; Zardes 44', 62'; Etienne (yellow card) 56'	Report	Quioto 90+2'	Stadium: Lower.com Field; Attendance: 19,423; Referee: Nima Saghafi

September 29 27	CF Montréal	1–4	New England Revolution	Montreal, Quebec
7:30 pm (EDT)	Piette (yellow card) 27'; Torres 32'; Miller (yellow card) 90'	Report	Jones 10'; Buksa 17'; Camacho 30' (o.g.); Bou (yellow card) 58' (goal) 86'; Caicedo (yellow card) 90+1'	Stadium: Saputo Stadium; Referee: Ismail Elfath

October 2 28	CF Montréal	2–1	Atlanta United FC	Montreal, Quebec
7:00 pm (EDT)	Quioto 49' 55'; Ibrahim (yellow card) 78'; Camacho (yellow card) 87'; Choinière (yellow card) 90+4'	Report	Mulraney 48'; Walkes (yellow card) 53'	Stadium: Saputo Stadium; Referee: Fotis Bazakos

October 16 29	CF Montréal	2–2	Philadelphia Union	Montreal, Quebec
1:00 pm (EDT)	Miljevic 33'; Mihailovic (yellow card) 44'; Waterman (yellow card) 75'; Ibrahim 90+5'	Report	Pantemis 63' (o.g.); Wagner 77'	Stadium: Saputo Stadium; Referee: Pierre-Luc Lauziere

October 20 30	Orlando City SC	1–1	CF Montréal	Orlando, Florida
7:30 pm (EDT)	Rosell (yellow card) 30'; Mueller 45'; Schlegel (yellow card) 90+4'	Report	Camacho 51'; Ibrahim (yellow card) 90+1'	Stadium: Exploria Stadium; Attendance: 15,775; Referee: Robert Sibiga

October 23 31	Toronto FC	1–1	CF Montréal	Toronto, Ontario
7:30 pm (EDT)	Mullins (yellow card) 6'; Okello (yellow card) 53'; Osorio (yellow card) 57'; Shaffelburg (yellow card) 64'; Altidore 90+5'	Report	Ibrahim 55'; Maciel (yellow card) 58'	Stadium: BMO Field; Attendance: 8,095; Referee: Allen Chapman

October 30 32	New York Red Bulls	1–0	CF Montréal	Harrison, New Jersey
4:00 pm (EDT)	Reyes (yellow card) 81'; Fábio 90+1'	Report		Stadium: Red Bull Arena; Attendance: 16,344; Referee: Chris Penso

November 3 33	CF Montréal	2–0	Houston Dynamo FC	Montreal, Quebec
7:30 pm (EDT)	Camacho 58'; Miller 62'; Breza (yellow card) 90+1'	Report	Hoffmann (yellow card) 44'; Lassiter (yellow card) 53'; Carrasquilla (yellow card) 85'	Stadium: Saputo Stadium; Referee: Ted Unkel

November 7 34	CF Montréal	0–2	Orlando City SC	Montreal, Quebec
3:30 pm (EST)	Piette (yellow card) 45+1'; Camacho (red card) 79'	Report	Water (yellow card) 34'; Méndez 55', (yellow card) 56'; Urso (yellow card) 65'; Dike 86'	Stadium: Saputo Stadium; Referee: Armando Villarreal

== Canadian Championship ==
=== Bracket ===
The bracket was announced on July 19, 2021.

Preliminary round August 15–26
Ottawa, ON
CPL	Atlético Ottawa	2
CPL	Valour FC	3
Halifax, NS
CPL	HFX Wanderers FC	2
PLSQ	AS Blainville	1
Toronto (York Lions), ON
CPL	York United FC	5
L1O	Master's FA	0
Edmonton, AB
CPL	FC Edmonton	0
CPL	Cavalry FC	2
Langford, BC
CPL	Pacific FC	4
MLS	Vancouver Whitecaps FC	3

Quarter-finals; September 15–22
Hamilton, ON
CPL	Forge FC	2
CPL	Valour FC	1
Halifax, NS
CPL	HFX Wanderers FC	1
MLS	CF Montréal	3
Toronto (BMO), ON
MLS	Toronto FC	4
CPL	York United FC	0
Foothills County, AB
CPL	Cavalry FC	0
CPL	Pacific FC	1

Semi-finals; October 27 – November 3
Hamilton, ON
CPL	Forge FC	0 (7)
MLS	CF Montréal (p)	0 (8)
Toronto (BMO), ON
MLS	Toronto FC	2
CPL	Pacific FC	1

Final; November 21
Montreal, QC
MLS	CF Montréal	1
MLS	Toronto FC	0

=== Canadian Championship results ===
==== Quarter-final ====
September 22	HFX Wanderers	1–3	CF Montréal	Halifax, Nova Scotia
5:00 pm (EDT)	Bent 27'	Report	Miljevic 35'; Tabla 89', 90+2'	Stadium: Wanderers Grounds; Attendance: 6,419; Referee: Yusri Rudolf

==== Semi-final ====
October 27	Forge	0–0 (7–8 p)	CF Montréal	Hamilton, Ontario
7:30 PM (EDT)	Borges (yellow card) 58'	Report	Miljevic (yellow card) 38'; Piette (yellow card) 52'; Waterman (yellow card) 57'; Tabla (yellow card) 80'	Stadium: Tim Hortons Field; Attendance: 5,388; Referee: Yusri Rudolf
	Penalties
	Babouli (penalty missed); Krutzen (penalty scored); Awuah (penalty missed); Cissé (penalty scored); Bekker (penalty scored); Browne (penalty missed); Choinière (penalty scored); Navarro (penalty scored); Samuel (penalty scored); Achinioti-Jönsson (penalty scored); Henry (penalty missed)		(penalty scored) Lappalainen; (penalty missed) Johnsen; (penalty missed) Tabla; (penalty scored) Camacho; (penalty scored) Zouhir; (penalty missed) Piette; (penalty scored) Struna; (penalty scored) Bassong; (penalty scored) Bayiha; (penalty scored) Waterman; (penalty scored) Breza

==== Final ====
November 21	CF Montréal	1–0	Toronto FC	Montreal, Quebec
1:00 PM (EST)	Torres (yellow card) 21'; Quioto 72'	Report	Laryea (yellow card) 36'; Soteldo (yellow card) 57'; Delgado (yellow card) 87'	Stadium: Saputo Stadium; Referee: David Gantar

== Statistics ==
=== Appearances, minutes played, and goals scored ===
No.	Nat.	Player	Total			Major League Soccer			Canadian Championship			Ref.
No.	Nat.	Player	App.	Min.	Gls	App.	Min.	Gls	App.	Min.	Gls	Ref.
Goalkeepers
1	(Canada)	Sebastian Breza	11	990	0	8	720	0	3	270	0	
41	(Canada)	James Pantemis	18	1620	0	18	1620	0	0	0	0	
Defenders
3	(Canada)	Kamal Miller	28	2467	1	27	2377	1	1	90	0	
4	(France)	Rudy Camacho	34	2942	3	31	2746	3	3	196	0	
12	(Uganda)	Mustafa Kizza	20	797	0	18	656	0	2	141	0	
15	(Canada)	Zachary Brault-Guillard	33	2198	2	30	2056	2	3	142	0	
16	(Canada)	Joel Waterman	25	2124	0	22	1854	0	3	270	0	
19	(Canada)	Zorhan Bassong	29	1458	0	26	1248	0	3	210	0	
24	(Slovenia)	Aljaž Struna	19	1524	1	18	1434	1	1	90	0	
26	(Iceland)	Róbert Thorkelsson	0	0	0	0	0	0	0	0	0	
27	(Canada)	Clément Bayiha	12	396	0	10	281	0	2	115	0	
Midfielders
2	(Kenya)	Victor Wanyama	28	2455	2	27	2365	2	1	90	0	
6	(Canada)	Samuel Piette	28	1906	1	25	1714	1	3	192	0	
7	(Egypt)	Ahmed Hamdy	26	1081	2	23	882	2	3	199	0	
8	(United States)	Djordje Mihailovic	35	2895	4	34	2805	4	1	90	0	
11	(United States)	Matko Miljevic	7	243	2	5	139	1	2	104	1	
17	(Canada)	Ballou Tabla	4	95	2	2	19	0	2	76	2	
25	(Argentina)	Emanuel Maciel	19	964	0	18	874	0	1	90	0	
26	(Canada)	Ismaël Koné	0	0	0	0	0	0	0	0	0	
29	(Canada)	Mathieu Choinière	27	2082	2	26	1992	2	1	90	0	
36	(Canada)	Nathan Saliba	0	0	0	0	0	0	0	0	0	
38	(Canada)	Rida Zouhir	4	107	0	2	16	0	2	91	0	
Forwards
9	(Norway)	Bjørn Johnsen	28	939	2	26	888	2	2	51	0	
13	(United States)	Mason Toye	14	893	7	14	893	7	0	0	0	
18	(Argentina)	Joaquín Torres	29	1964	4	28	1891	4	1	73	0	
21	(Finland)	Lassi Lappalainen	18	651	1	15	558	1	3	93	0	
22	(Nigeria)	Sunusi Ibrahim	28	1039	4	26	903	4	2	136	0	
30	(Honduras)	Romell Quioto	20	1318	9	19	1240	8	1	78	1	
35	(Canada)	Jean-Aniel Assi	0	0	0	0	0	0	0	0	0	
No Longer with the Club
11	(United States)	Erik Hurtado	7	281	0	7	281	0	0	0	0	
14	(Bosnia and Herzegovina)	Amar Sejdič	7	388	0	7	388	0	0	0	0	
23	(Senegal)	Clément Diop	8	720	0	8	720	0	0	0	0	
Last updated: November 22, 2021

=== Top scorers ===
Rank	Nat.	Player	Pos.	MLS	Canadian Championship	TOTAL
1	(Honduras)	Romell Quioto	FW	8	1	9
2	(United States)	Mason Toye	FW	7		7
3	(United States)	Djordje Mihailovic	MF	4		4
3	(Argentina)	Joaquín Torres	FW	4		4
3	(Nigeria)	Sunusi Ibrahim	FW	4		4
6	(France)	Rudy Camacho	DF	3		3
7	(Norway)	Bjorn Johnsen	FW	2		2
7	(Egypt)	Ahmed Hamdy	MF	2		2
7	(Canada)	Zachary Brault-Guillard	DF	2		2
7	(Kenya)	Victor Wanyama	MF	2		2
7	(Canada)	Mathieu Choinière	MF	2		2
7	(United States)	Matko Miljevic	MF	1	1	2
7	(Canada)	Ballou Tabla	MF		2	2
14	(Canada)	Samuel Piette	MF	1		1
14	(Canada)	Kamal Miller	DF	1		1
14	(Slovenia)	Aljaž Struna	DF	1		1
14	(Finland)	Lassi Lappalainen	FW	1		1
Totals				45	4	49

Updated to match played November 22, 2021
Italic: denotes player left the club during the season.

=== Top assists ===
Rank	Nat.	Player	Pos.	MLS	Canadian Championship	TOTAL
1	(United States)	Djordje Mihailovic	MF	16		16
2	(Honduras)	Romell Quioto	FW	6		6
3	(Argentina)	Joaquín Torres	FW	5		5
4	(Canada)	Zachary Brault-Guillard	DF	3	1	4
5	(Canada)	Kamal Miller	DF	3		3
5	(Canada)	Joel Waterman	DF	3		3
5	(Finland)	Lassi Lappalainen	FW	2	1	3
8	(Canada)	Samuel Piette	MF	2		2
8	(Uganda)	Mustafa Kizza	DF	2		2
8	(Canada)	Zorhan Bassong	DF	1	1	2
11	(Kenya)	Victor Wanyama	MF	1		1
11	(France)	Rudy Camacho	DF		1	1
11	(United States)	Erik Hurtado	FW	1		1
Totals				45	4	49

Updated to match played November 22, 2021
Italic: denotes player left the club during the season.

=== Goals against average ===
No.	Nat.	Player	Total			Major League Soccer			Canadian Championship		
No.	Nat.	Player	MIN	GA	GAA	MIN	GA	GAA	MIN	GA	GAA
1	CAN	Sebastian Breza	990	9	0.82	720	8	1.00	270	1	0.33
23	SEN	Clément Diop	720	9	1.13	720	9	1.13	0	0	0.00
41	CAN	James Pantemis	1620	27	1.50	1620	27	1.50	0	0	0.00

Updated to match played November 22, 2021
Source: CF Montréal
Italic: denotes player left the club during the season.

=== Clean sheets ===
No.	Nat.	Player	MLS	Canadian Championship	TOTAL
41	(Canada)	James Pantemis	3		3
23	(Senegal)	Clément Diop	3		3
1	(Canada)	Sebastian Breza	2	2	4
Totals			8	2	10

Updated to match played November 22, 2021
Source: MLSsoccer.com
Italic: denotes player left the club during the season.

=== Top minutes played ===
No.	Nat.	Player	Pos.	MLS	Canadian Championship	TOTAL
4	(France)	Rudy Camacho	DF	2746	196	2942
8	(United States)	Djordje Mihailovic	MF	2805	90	2895
3	(Canada)	Kamal Miller	DF	2377	90	2467
2	(Kenya)	Victor Wanyama	MF	2365	90	2455
15	(Canada)	Zachary Brault-Guillard	DF	2056	142	2198
16	(Canada)	Joel Waterman	DF	1854	270	2124
29	(Canada)	Mathieu Choinière	MF	1992	90	2082
18	(Argentina)	Joaquín Torres	FW	1891	73	1964
6	(Canada)	Samuel Piette	MF	1714	192	1906
41	(Canada)	James Pantemis	GK	1620		1620

Updated to match played November 22, 2021
Source: Montreal Impact
Italic: denotes player left the club during the season.

=== Yellow and red cards ===
No.	Player	Total			Major League Soccer			Canadian Championship			Ref.
No.	Player	Yellow card	(yellow card) (red card)	Red card	Yellow card	(yellow card) (red card)	Red card	Yellow card	(yellow card) (red card)	Red card	Ref.
1	Sebastian Breza	2	0	0	2	0	0	0	0	0	
2	Victor Wanyama	8	0	1	8	0	1	0	0	0	
3	Kamal Miller	5	0	0	5	0	0	0	0	0	
4	Rudy Camacho	7	1	2	7	1	2	0	0	0	
6	Samuel Piette	6	0	0	5	0	0	1	0	0	
7	Ahmed Hamdy	1	0	0	1	0	0	0	0	0	
8	Djordje Mihailovic	4	0	0	4	0	0	0	0	0	
9	Bjørn Johnsen	0	0	0	0	0	0	0	0	0	
11	Matko Miljevic	2	0	0	0	0	0	2	0	0	
12	Mustafa Kizza	1	0	0	1	0	0	0	0	0	
13	Mason Toye	1	0	0	1	0	0	0	0	0	
15	Zachary Brault-Guillard	4	0	0	4	0	0	0	0	0	
16	Joel Waterman	6	0	0	5	0	0	1	0	0	
17	Ballou Tabla	1	0	0	0	0	0	1	0	0	
18	Joaquín Torres	1	0	0	0	0	0	1	0	0	
19	Zorhan Bassong	2	1	0	2	1	0	0	0	0	
21	Lassi Lappalainen	0	0	0	0	0	0	0	0	0	
22	Sunusi Ibrahim	2	0	0	2	0	0	0	0	0	
23	Clément Diop	1	0	0	1	0	0	0	0	0	
24	Aljaž Struna	6	0	0	6	0	0	0	0	0	
25	Emanuel Maciel	2	0	0	2	0	0	0	0	0	
26	Róbert Thorkelsson	0	0	0	0	0	0	0	0	0	
27	Clément Bayiha	0	0	0	0	0	0	0	0	0	
28	Ismaël Koné	0	0	0	0	0	0	0	0	0	
29	Mathieu Choinière	3	0	0	3	0	0	0	0	0	
30	Romell Quioto	2	0	0	2	0	0	0	0	0	
35	Jean-Aniel Assi	0	0	0	0	0	0	0	0	0	
36	Nathan Saliba	0	0	0	0	0	0	0	0	0	
38	Rida Zouhir	0	0	0	0	0	0	0	0	0	
41	James Pantemis	0	0	0	0	0	0	0	0	0	
Totals		67	2	3	61	2	3	6	0	0	
Last updated: November 22, 2021

== Recognition ==
=== MLS team of the Week ===
Week	Player	Nation	Position	Report
1	Brault-Guillard	Canada	DF	MLS team of the Week: 1
1	Nancy	France	Coach	MLS team of the Week: 1
1	Mihailovic	United States	BN	MLS team of the Week: 1
2	Brault-Guillard	Canada	DF	MLS team of the Week: 2
5	Johnsen	Norway	BN	MLS team of the Week: 5
7	Diop	Senegal	BN	MLS team of the Week: 7
7	Toye	United States	BN	MLS team of the Week: 7
9	Diop	Senegal	GK	MLS team of the Week: 9
10	Struna	Slovenia	DF	MLS team of the Week: 10
11	Choinière	Canada	BN	MLS team of the Week: 11
12	Mihailovic	United States	MF	MLS team of the Week: 12
13	Hamdy	Egypt	MF	MLS team of the Week: 13
13	Toye	United States	FW	MLS team of the Week: 13
19	Wanyama	Kenya	MF	MLS team of the Week: 19
20	Breza	Canada	BN	MLS team of the Week: 20
25	Quioto	Honduras	FW	MLS team of the Week: 25
25	Mihailovic	United States	BN	MLS team of the Week: 25
26	Pantemis	Canada	BN	MLS team of the Week: 26
26	Mihailovic	United States	BN	MLS team of the Week: 26
29	Quioto	Honduras	FW	MLS team of the Week: 29
29	Nancy	France	Coach	MLS team of the Week: 29
31	Camacho	France	DF	MLS team of the Week: 31
32	Pantemis	Canada	BN	MLS team of the Week: 32
