= Róbert Orri Þorkelsson =

Icelandic footballer

Róbert Þorkelsson
Personal information
- Full name: Róbert Orri Þorkelsson
- Date of birth: April 3, 2002 (age 24)
- Place of birth: Reykjavík, Iceland
- Height: 1.88 m (6 ft 2 in)
- Position: Defender

Team information
- Current team: Víkingur
- Number: 15

Youth career
- 2014–2018: Afturelding

Senior career*
Years	Team	Apps	(Gls)
2018–2019	Afturelding	35	(4)
2020–2021	Breiðablik	16	(1)
2021–2024	CF Montréal	20	(0)
2024	→ Konsvinger (loan)	19	(0)
2025–	Víkingur R	28	(1)

International career^{‡}
2018	Iceland U16	6	(1)
2018–2019	Iceland U17	14	(0)
2019	Iceland U18	2	(0)
2019	Iceland U19	1	(0)
2020–	Iceland U21	6	(0)
2022–	Iceland	4	(0)
- * Club domestic league appearances and goals as of 1 November 2026 ‡ National team caps and goals as of 18 March 2023

Róbert Orri Þorkelsson (born 3 April 2002), also known as Róbert Thorkelsson, is an Icelandic professional footballer who plays as a defender for Besta deild karla club Víkingur, and the Iceland national football team.

== Club career ==
On June 27, 2021, Róbert Orri signed his contract with CF Montréal. He made his professional debut with Montreal in a 0–1 loss against Cruz Azul on March 9, 2022, in the 2022 CONCACAF Champions League. In April 2024 he was sent out on loan to Norwegian club Konsvinger.

== Career statistics ==
As of March 27, 2022

Club	Season	League			National Cup (Note: Includes Icelandic Cup and Canadian Championship)		League Cup (Note: Includes Icelandic League Cup, Icelandic League Cup B and MLS Cup Playoffs)		Continental (Note: Includes UEFA Europa League and CONCACAF Champions League)		Total	
Club	Season	Division	Apps	Goals	Apps	Goals	Apps	Goals	Apps	Goals	Apps	Goals
Afturelding	2018	2. deild karla	16	1	2	0	4	0	—		22	1
Afturelding	2019	1. deild karla	19	3	3	1	4	1	—		26	5
Afturelding	Total		35	4	5	1	8	1	0	0	48	6
Breiðablik	2020	Úrvalsdeild	13	1	1	0	4	0	1	0	19	1
Breiðablik	2021	Úrvalsdeild	3	0	0	0	4	1	0	0	7	1
Breiðablik	Total		16	1	1	0	8	1	1	0	26	2
CF Montréal	2021	Major League Soccer	0	0	0	0	—		—		0	0
CF Montréal	2022	Major League Soccer	2	0	0	0	—		2	0	4	0
CF Montréal	Total		2	0	0	0	0	0	2	0	4	0
Career Total			53	5	6	1	16	2	3	0	78	8
