= James Pantemis =

Canadian soccer player (born 1997)

- Pantemis with Portland Timbers in 2025

Personal information
- Full name: James Pantemis
- Date of birth: February 21, 1997 (age 29)
- Place of birth: Kirkland, Quebec, Canada
- Height: 1.85 m (6 ft 1 in)
- Position: Goalkeeper

Team information
- Current team: Portland Timbers
- Number: 41

Youth career
- Pierrefonds
- Lakeshore
- 2014–2017: Montreal Impact

Senior career*
Years	Team	Apps	(Gls)
2016	FC Montreal	2	(0)
2018–2023	CF Montréal (Note: Montreal Impact changed its name to CF Montréal in 2021)	34	(0)
2020	→ Valour FC (loan)	7	(0)
2023	→ CF Montréal U23 (loan)	1	(0)
2024–	Portland Timbers	68	(0)

International career^{‡}
2012	Canada U15		
2013	Canada U16		
2015–2016	Canada U20	3	(0)
2018	Canada U21	3	(0)
2021	Canada U23	4	(0)
2026	Canada B	1	(0)
- * Club domestic league appearances and goals as of November 7, 2026 ‡ National team caps and goals as of January 17, 2026

James Pantemis (born February 21, 1997) is a Canadian professional soccer player who plays as a goalkeeper for Portland Timbers in Major League Soccer.

== Early life ==
Pantemis started playing soccer for AS Pierrefonds at the age of four and later played for Lakeshore SC before joining the Montreal Impact Academy in 2014.

== Club career ==
=== FC Montreal ===
In 2016 Pantemis joined FC Montreal, the second team of the Montreal Impact in the USL. He made his professional debut on May 2, 2016, in a 1–0 defeat to Orlando City II, and also featured in a 2–1 defeat to Bethlehem Steel on May 15, 2016.

He played two games for FC Montreal after tearing his LCL in June 2016, and was still injured when the club ceased operations after the 2016 season, leaving him unattached.

=== Montreal Impact / CF Montréal ===
After recovering from his LCL injury, Pantemis trained with Serie A club Bologna in September 2017, before signing a first team contract with the Montreal Impact in November 2017.

He made his competitive debut for the Impact on July 24, 2019, in a Canadian Championship match against York9 with the Impact winning 1-0.

On March 6, 2020, Pantemis was sent on loan to Canadian Premier League side Valour FC, reuniting with his former Canada U20 coach Rob Gale. He made his debut for Valour on August 16 against Cavalry FC.

After the 2022 MLS season, where Pantemis split starting duties with Sebastian Breza, his option was initially declined by CF Montréal. Pantemis then signed new one-year deal with the club, with an options for 2024 and 2025. At the end of the 2023, CF Montréal declined his option for 2024, ending his time with the club.

=== Portland Timbers ===
In January 2024, Pantemis signed with the Portland Timbers.

== International career ==
=== Youth ===
Pantemis was a part of Canada's U-20 program and made his start in a 2–1 victory over England. In May 2018, Pantemis was named to Canada's under-21 squad for the 2018 Toulon Tournament.

In February 2020 Pantemis was named to the provisional roster for the Canadian U-23 team ahead of the 2020 CONCACAF Men's Olympic Qualifying Championship. He was named to the final squad on March 10, 2021.

=== Senior ===
In June 2017, he was called up to the Canadian senior national team for a friendly against Curaçao, but did not appear. He was subsequently called up for a friendly against Jamaica in September of that year.

In November 2022, Pantemis was named to Canada's squad for the 2022 FIFA World Cup.

In January 2026, he was called up to Canada for a training camp and friendly against Guatemala, which he started, however, as it was designated a B-level friendly, it did not count as an official senior cap.

== Personal life ==
Pantemis was born in Canada and is of Greek descent. He holds a Greek passport.

== Career statistics ==
As of match played November 21, 2026

Appearances and goals by club, season and competition
Club	Season	League			Playoffs		National cup (Note: Includes Canadian Championship)		Continental		Other		Total	
Club	Season	Division	Apps	Goals	Apps	Goals	Apps	Goals	Apps	Goals	Apps	Goals	Apps	Goals
FC Montreal	2016	USL	2	0	—		—		—		—		2	0
CF Montréal	2019	Major League Soccer	0	0	—		2	0	—		—		2	0
CF Montréal	2020	Major League Soccer	3	0	0	0	—		0	0	—		3	0
CF Montréal	2021	Major League Soccer	18	0	—		0	0	—		—		18	0
CF Montréal	2022	Major League Soccer	11	0	0	0	2	0	0	0	—		13	0
CF Montréal	2023	Major League Soccer	2	0	—		0	0	—		0	0	2	0
CF Montréal	Total		34	0	0	0	4	0	0	0	2	0	40	0
Valour FC (loan)	2020	Canadian Premier League	7	0	—		—		—		—		7	0
CF Montréal U23 (loan)	2023	Ligue1 Québec	1	0	—		—		—		0	0	1	0
Portland Timbers	2024	Major League Soccer	15	0	1	0	—		—		0	0	16	0
Portland Timbers	2025	Major League Soccer	19	0	4	0	0	0	—		2 (Note: Appearances in Leagues Cup)	0	25	0
Portland Timbers	2026	Major League Soccer	34	0	1	0	—		—		0	0	35	0
Portland Timbers	Total		68	0	6	0	0	0	0	0	2	0	76	0
Career total			112	0	6	0	4	0	0	0	2	0	124	0

== Honours ==
=== Club ===
Montreal Impact

- Canadian Championship: 2019, 2021
