= Rudy Camacho =

French footballer (born 1991)

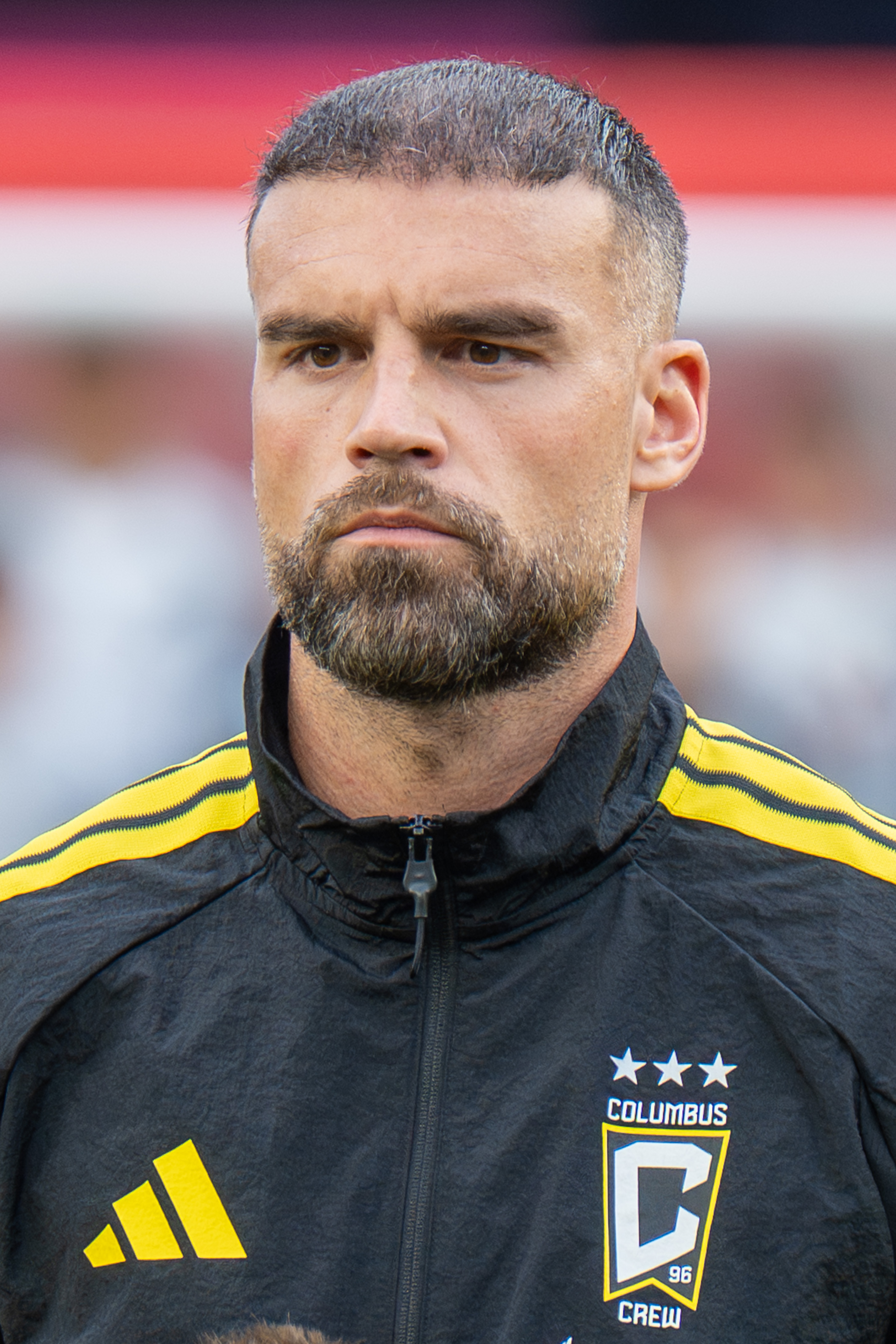
- Camacho with Columbus Crew in 2026

Personal information
- Full name: Rudy Adrien Camacho
- Date of birth: 5 March 1991 (age 35)
- Place of birth: L'Arbresle, France
- Height: 1.86 m (6 ft 1 in)
- Position: Defender

Team information
- Current team: Columbus Crew
- Number: 4

Youth career
- 2000–?: Lyon Ouest Sporting Club
- CAS Cheminots d’Oullins
- Nancy

Senior career*
Years	Team	Apps	(Gls)
2008–2012	Nancy B	71	(3)
2012–2014	Lyon-Duchère	51	(5)
2014–2016	Sedan	56	(1)
2016–2018	Waasland-Beveren	56	(2)
2018–2023	CF Montréal (Note: Montreal Impact changed its name to CF Montréal in 2021)	128	(7)
2023–	Columbus Crew	57	(1)
2025	Columbus Crew 2	1	(0)
- * Club domestic league appearances and goals as of 15:53, 5 November 2026 (UTC)

Rudy Adrien Camacho (born 5 March 1991) is a French professional footballer who plays as a defender for Major League Soccer club Columbus Crew.

== Early life ==
Camacho began playing youth football with Lyon Ouest Sporting Club, before moving to CAS Cheminots d’Oullins and then Nancy.

== Career ==
Camacho began his senior career with Nancy B.

In 2012, after missing out on signing a pro contract with Nancy, he was on trial with Ligue 2 club Boulogne but he tore his quadriceps and was injured for three months. After recovering from his setback, Camacho would join fourth division club Lyon-Duchère.

In 2014, he moved to fellow fourth division side Sedan, captaining them the following year after their promotion to the Championnat National. He scored a goal in the Coupe de France on 25 October 2015 in a 6–1 thrashing of FCA Troyes.

In 2016, he joined Belgian First Division A club Waasland-Beveren on a two-year contract, with an option for a third. He was named captain of the team in early February 2018 after Ibrahima Seck left the club.

=== Major League Soccer ===
==== CF Montréal ====
In March 2018, Camacho signed with Canadian club CF Montréal in Major League Soccer. After starting in the first three games for his new club in which he was able, he was sidelined with hip inflammation, causing him to miss the following six games.

In 2019, Camacho won the Canadian Championship. He scored his first goal for his new club on 6 July 2019 in a 3–2 loss to Minnesota United.

During the 2020 season, he scored the only goal in a 1–0 game at Toronto FC on 1 September. He was shown a direct red card three games later on 16 September for punching the knee of Fredy Montero in a game against the Vancouver Whitecaps.

During the 2021 season, Camacho scored in a CONCACAF Champions League match versus Cruz Azul On 16 March. He scored and received a direct red card in a 4 August match against Atlanta United. On 18 August, in his second game back from red card suspension, Camacho received a second yellow in a match versus FC Cincinnati. The following match seven days later, he received a yellow card, which resulted him being suspended for the following game because of an accumulation of yellow cards. On 20 October, he scored the equalizer in a 1–1 draw versus Orlando City, and the winner in a 2-0 game at home to the Houston Dynamo. On the final game of the regular season on 7 November, Camacho received a direct red card. During the Canadian Championship, he played in all three games, assisting the only goal in the final from a long ball over the top, giving him his second Voyageurs Cup. At the end of the season, he was named the team's Defensive Player of the Year.

In February 2022, he extended his contract with the club until the end of the 2023 season.

==== Columbus Crew ====
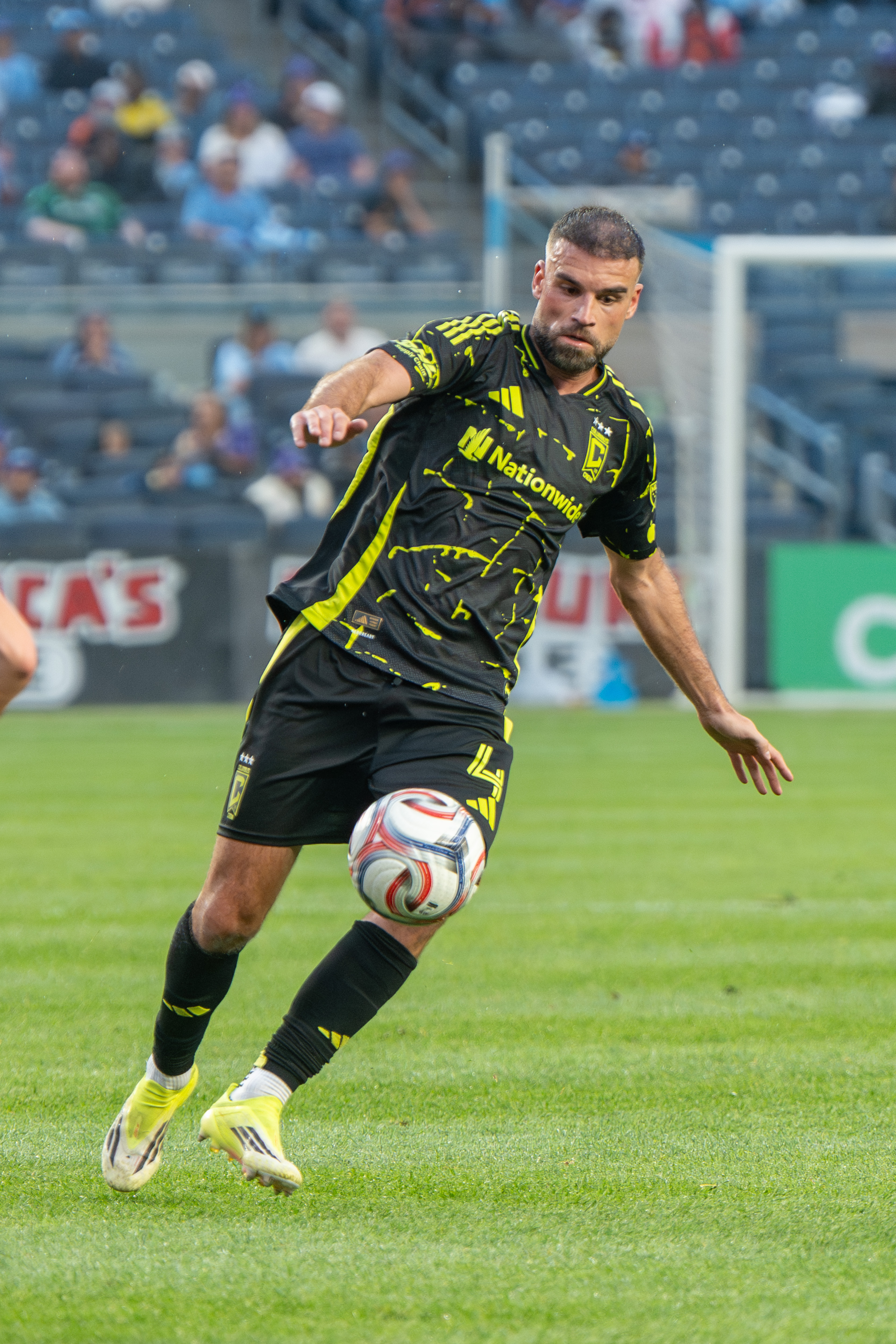
Camacho in 2026 with the Columbus Crew

On 31 July 2023, Camacho was traded to fellow Major League Soccer side Columbus Crew in exchange for $400,000 in General Allocation Money. Camacho would go on to win MLS Cup with his new side, earning a two-year contract extension after the victory.

During the 2024 season, he scored a headed goal from a corner in a 5–1 victory against the New England Revolution on 29 June, and was named to the MLS all-star team on 24 July.

During the 2025 preseason, Camacho suffered an injury that would eventually require surgery to fix, which caused him to not play a game for the first team the entire regular season. In early October, he made an appearance for the reserve team, playing in just the first half. He appeared on the bench for the first team on the final game of the regular season, but failed to enter the game. He made his 2025 season debut in the playoffs as an 81st minute substitute against FC Cincinnati.

== Style of play ==
Rudy Camacho is a player known for his defensive aggression, technical ability, passing, and leadership.

== Career statistics ==
As of match played June 6, 2024

Appearances and goals by club, season and competition
Club	Season	League			National cup		Continental		Other		Total	
Club	Season	Division	Apps	Goals	Apps	Goals	Apps	Goals	Apps	Goals	Apps	Goals
Nancy B	2008–09	Championnat de France Amateur	1	0	—		—		—		1	0
Nancy B	2009–10	Championnat de France Amateur	18	1	—		—		—		18	1
Nancy B	2010–11	Championnat de France Amateur	26	1	—		—		—		26	1
Nancy B	2011–12	Championnat de France Amateur	26	1	—		—		—		26	1
Nancy B	Total		71	3	—		—		—		71	3
Lyon-Duchère	2012–13	Championnat de France Amateur	24	0	—		—		—		24	0
Lyon-Duchère	2013–14	Championnat de France Amateur	27	5	1	0	—		—		28	5
Lyon-Duchère	Total		51	5	1	0	—		—		52	5
Sedan	2014–15	Championnat de France Amateur	27	1	1	0	—		—		28	1
Sedan	2015–16	Championnat National	29	0	2	0	—		—		31	0
Sedan	Total		56	1	3	0	—		—		59	1
Waasland-Beveren	2016–17	Belgian First Division A	29	1	2	0	6 (Note: Appearance(s) in UEFA Europa League Playoffs)	1	—		37	2
Waasland-Beveren	2017–18	Belgian First Division A	27	1	3	1	—		—		30	2
Waasland-Beveren	Total		56	2	5	1	6	1	—		67	4
CF Montréal	2018	Major League Soccer	18	0	1	0	—		—		19	0
CF Montréal	2019	Major League Soccer	17	1	5	0	—		—		22	1
CF Montréal	2020	Major League Soccer	14	1	—		2 (Note: Appearance(s) in CONCACAF Champions League)	0	1 (Note: Appearance(s) in MLS Cup Playoffs)	0	17	1
CF Montréal	2021	Major League Soccer	31	3	3	0	—		—		34	3
CF Montréal	2022	Major League Soccer	28	1	1	0	2 (Note: Appearance(s) in CONCACAF Champions League)	1	0	0	31	2
CF Montréal	2023	Major League Soccer	20	1	4	0	0	0	2 (Note: Appearance(s) in Leagues Cup)	0	26	1
CF Montréal	Total		128	7	14	0	4	0	2	0	149	8
Columbus Crew	2023	Major League Soccer	11	0	0	0	—		6 (Note: Appearance(s) in MLS Cup Playoffs)	0	17	0
Columbus Crew	2024	Major League Soccer	11	0	—		6 (Note: Appearance(s) in CONCACAF Champions Cup)	0	0	0	17	0
Columbus Crew	Total		22	0	0	0	6	0	6	0	34	0
Career total			384	18	23	1	16	1	9	0	421	20

== Honours ==
CF Montréal

- Canadian Championship: 2019, 2021

Columbus Crew

- MLS Cup: 2023
- Leagues Cup: 2024
- CONCACAF Champions Cup runner-up: 2024

Individual

- MLS All-Star: 2024
