= Jean-Aniel Assi =

Canadian soccer player (born 2004)

Personal information
- Full name: Jean-Aniel Eclesiaste Assi
- Date of birth: August 12, 2004 (age 22)
- Place of birth: Adzopé, Ivory Coast
- Height: 1.85 m (6 ft 1 in)
- Position: Winger

Team information
- Current team: Atlético Ottawa

Youth career
- ASM LaSalle
- Royal-Sélect de Beauport
- 2017–2020: Montreal Impact

Senior career*
Years	Team	Apps	(Gls)
2020–2023	CF Montréal (Note: Montreal Impact changed its name to CF Montréal in 2021)	0	(0)
2022	→ Cavalry FC (loan)	19	(0)
2023	→ Atlético Ottawa (loan)	25	(1)
2024	Crown Legacy	7	(0)
2024–2025	Marbella	3	(0)
2025	Alcorcón B	4	(0)
2025–	Atlético Ottawa	31	(3)

International career^{‡}
2019	Canada U15	5	(4)
2022	Canada U20	3	(0)
- * Club domestic league appearances and goals as of November 2, 2026 ‡ National team caps and goals as of June 26, 2022

Jean-Aniel Eclesiaste Assi (born August 12, 2004) is a professional soccer player who plays as a winger for Atlético Ottawa in the Canadian Premier League. Born in the Ivory Coast, he represented Canada at youth level.

== Early life ==
Born in Adzopé, Ivory Coast, in 2004, Assi moved to Canada at age 10. He began playing youth soccer in Canada with ASM LaSalle, before joining Royal-Sélect de Beauport. In 2017, he joined the Montreal Impact Academy. In 2020, he took part in the pre-season training camp with the first team, when he was only fifteen.

== Club career ==
In December 2020, Assi signed his first homegrown contract with Montreal Impact (later renamed CF Montréal for the 2021 season). Assi made his professional debut with Montreal Impact in a 1-0 CONCACAF Champions League win over C.D. Olimpia on December 15, 2020, becoming the youngest ever player to play for the club at the age of 16 years and 125 days.

In March 2022, Assi went on a one-year loan with Canadian Premier League side Cavalry FC. In February 2023, he went on loan with Atlético Ottawa. On July 12, 2023, he scored his first professional goal in a 2-0 victory for Atlético Ottawa over his former side Cavalry FC. Upon completion of the 2023 season, CF Montréal would announce that they would not pick up Assi's contract for 2024, ending his time with the club.

In January 2024, Assi joined Crown Legacy FC, the MLS Next Pro affiliate of Charlotte FC.

In October 2024, Assi signed with Marbella in the Spanish third tier Primera Federación until June 2026.

In February 2025, he moved to Alcorcón B in the Spanish fifth tier Tercera Federación.

In September 2025, he signed with Atlético Ottawa in the Canadian Premier League, whom he had previously played on loan with, through the 2027 season, with an option for 2028.

== International career ==
As of January 2021, Assi is eligible to represent both the Ivory Coast and Canada. In July 2019, he made his debut in the Canadian youth program at a U15 camp. He represented the Canada U15s at the 2019 CONCACAF Boys' Under-15 Championship, where he was named to the Tournament All-Star XI. In June 2022, he was named to the Canadian U-20 team for the 2022 CONCACAF U-20 Championship.

== Career statistics ==
As of October 28, 2025

Club	League	Season	League		Playoffs		Domestic Cup		Continental		Total	
Club	League	Season	Apps	Goals	Apps	Goals	Apps	Goals	Apps	Goals	Apps	Goals
CF Montreal	Major League Soccer	2020	0	0	0	0	—		1	0	1	0
CF Montreal	Major League Soccer	2021	0	0	—		0	0	—		0	0
CF Montreal	Total		0	0	0	0	0	0	1	0	1	0
Cavalry FC (loan)	Canadian Premier League	2022	19	0	0	0	2	0	—		21	0
Atlético Ottawa (loan)	Canadian Premier League	2023	25	1	—		2	0	—		27	1
Crown Legacy FC	MLS Next Pro	2024	7	0	0	0	1	0	—		8	0
Marbella	Primera Federación	2024–25	3	0	—		1	0	—		4	0
Alcorcón B	Tercera Federación	2024–25	4	0	—		—		—		4	0
Atlético Ottawa	Canadian Premier League	2025	5	0	0	0	0	0	–		5	0
Career Total			63	1	0	0	6	0	1	0	70	1
