= Samuel Piette =

Canadian soccer player (born 1994)

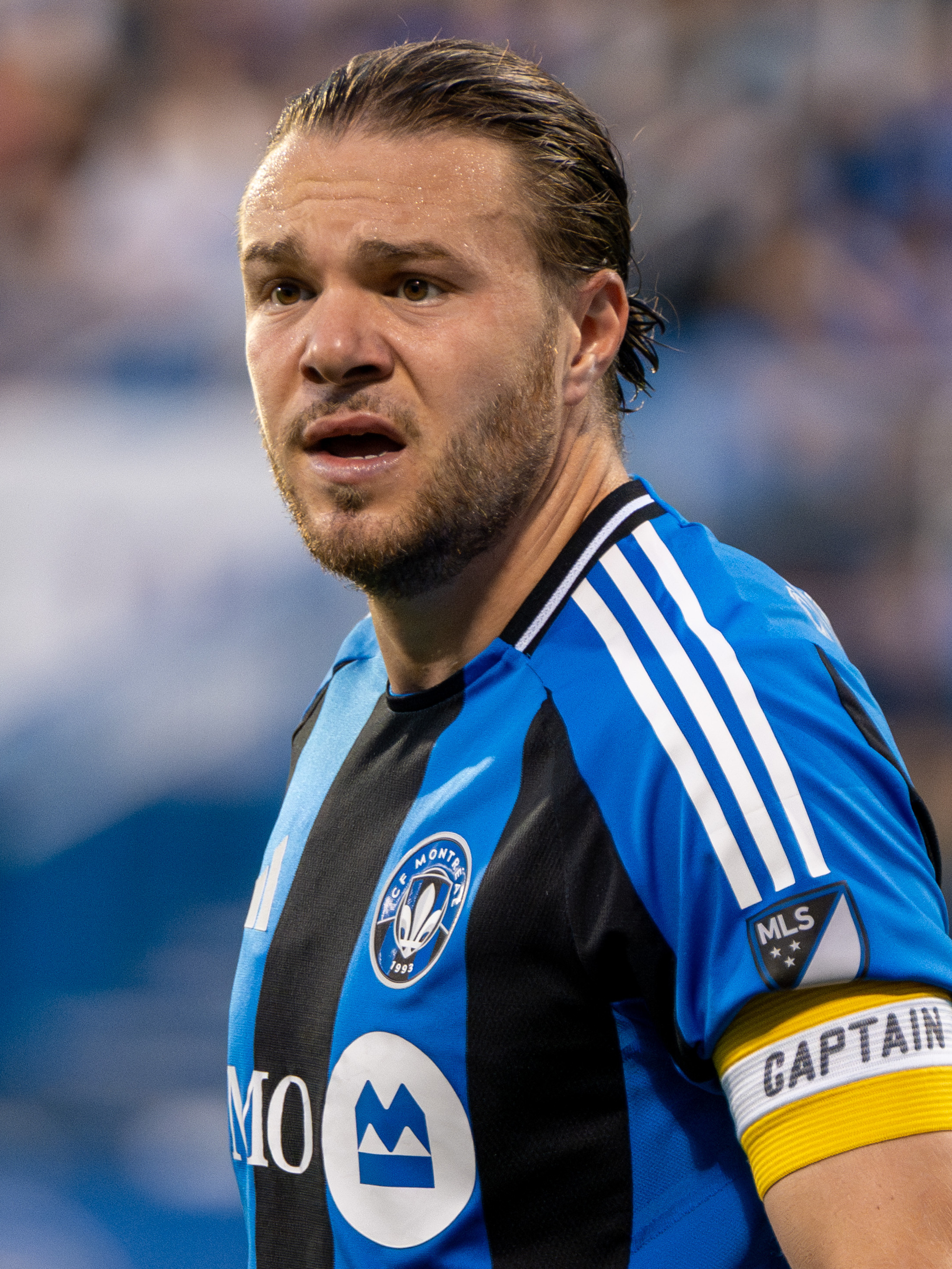
- Piette with CF Montréal in 2025

Personal information
- Full name: Samuel Piette
- Date of birth: 12 November 1994 (age 32)
- Place of birth: Le Gardeur, Quebec, Canada
- Height: 1.71 m (5 ft 7 in)
- Position: Defensive midfielder

Team information
- Current team: CF Montréal
- Number: 6

Youth career
- Lionceaux Le Gardeur
- Olympique de Repentigny
- 2008-2009: FC Boisbriand
- 2009–2012: Metz
- 2012–2013: Fortuna Düsseldorf

Senior career*
Years	Team	Apps	(Gls)
2013–2014	Fortuna Düsseldorf II	32	(0)
2014	Fortuna Düsseldorf	2	(0)
2014–2016	Deportivo La Coruña B	40	(2)
2015–2016	→ Racing de Ferrol (loan)	14	(0)
2016–2017	Izarra	32	(0)
2017–	CF Montréal (Note: Montreal Impact changed its name to CF Montréal in 2021)	231	(3)

International career^{‡}
2011	Canada U17	7	(0)
2012–2013	Canada U20	5	(3)
2012–2015	Canada U23	8	(0)
2012–	Canada	70	(0)
- * Club domestic league appearances and goals as of October 31, 2026 ‡ National team caps and goals as of October 3, 2026

Samuel Piette (born 12 November 1994) is a Canadian professional soccer player who plays as a defensive midfielder for Major League Soccer club CF Montréal and the Canada national team.

== Club career ==
=== Early career ===
Piette began playing soccer at age four with local club Lionceaux de Le Gardeur and later joined Olympique de Repentigny and FC Boisbriand. In 2009, he moved to Europe and joined the youth team of Metz but after French football rules, which state that a player must be 18 to sign a contract with a club, Piette joined Bundesliga youth side Fortuna Düsseldorf on 26 June 2012.

=== Fortuna Düsseldorf ===
After continuing to play for Fortuna Düsseldorf II Piette made his senior debut as a second-half substitute for Erwin Hoffer on 4 April 2014 in a 2–1 victory over SC Paderborn.

=== Deportivo La Coruña ===
On 25 August 2014, Piette signed a one-year deal with Deportivo de La Coruña, being assigned to the reserves in Tercera División. After overcoming fitness issues, Piette made his league debut against Bertamiráns on 30 November.

==== Loan to Racing de Ferrol ====
Piette was loaned to Racing de Ferrol for the 2015–16 season on 7 August 2015.

=== Izarra ===
After terminating his contract with Deportivo on 15 July 2016, Piette signed with Segunda División B club CD Izarra the following day.

=== CF Montréal ===
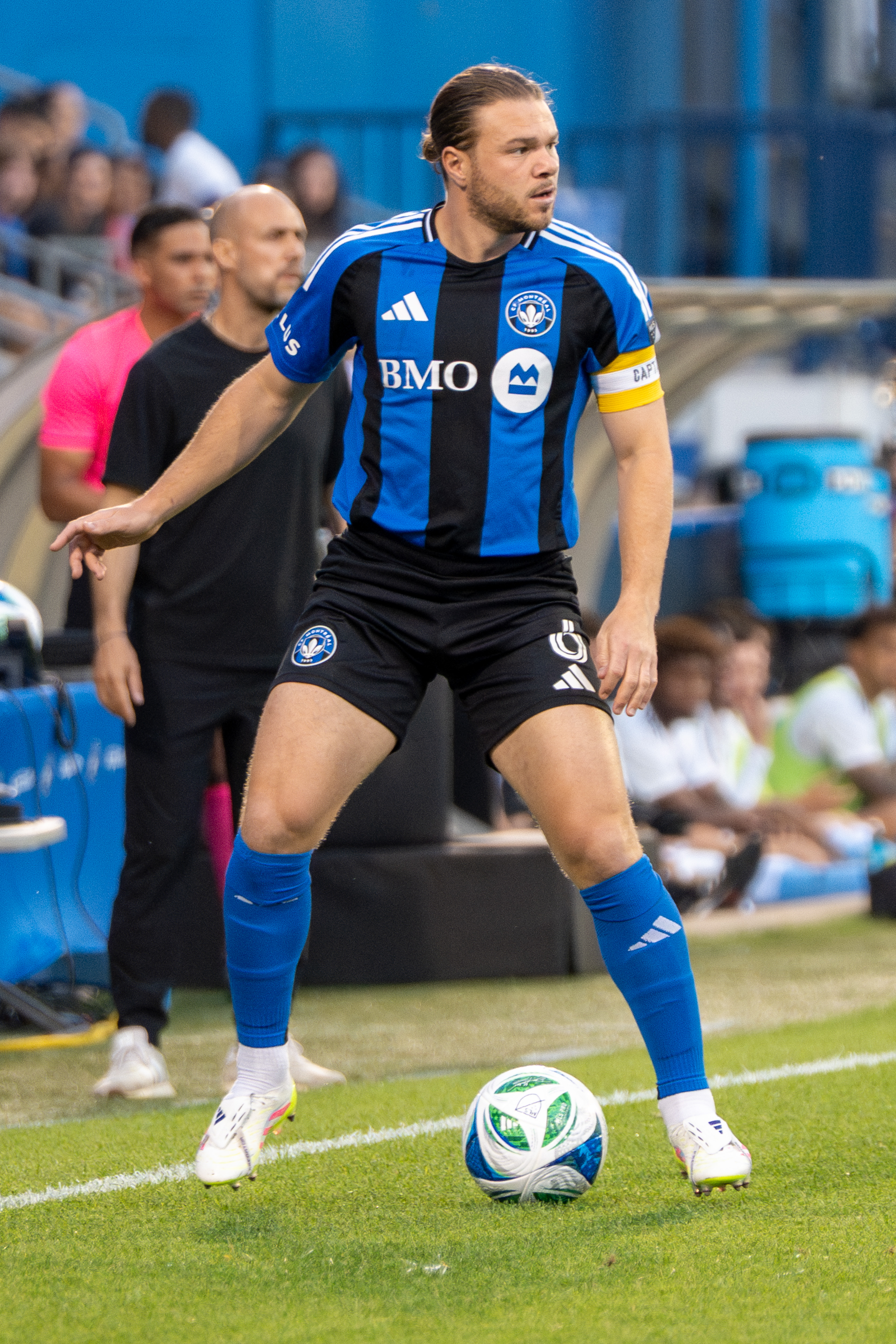
Sam Piette in 2025

On 3 August 2017, Piette returned to Canada to sign with Montreal Impact, later renamed CF Montréal, of Major League Soccer, citing a desire to play in his hometown. He made his debut for the club on 12 August in a 3–0 win over Philadelphia Union, earning rave reviews, as well as a place in the MLS team of the week. Piette had his option for the 2020 season exercised by the Impact, keeping him with the club for 2020. Shortly after, he signed a three-year extension with the Impact keeping him with the club through the 2022 season, with an option for the 2023 season. After the 2022 season, Piette would sign a new contract with CF Montréal through the end of the 2025 season, with an option for 2026.

== International career ==
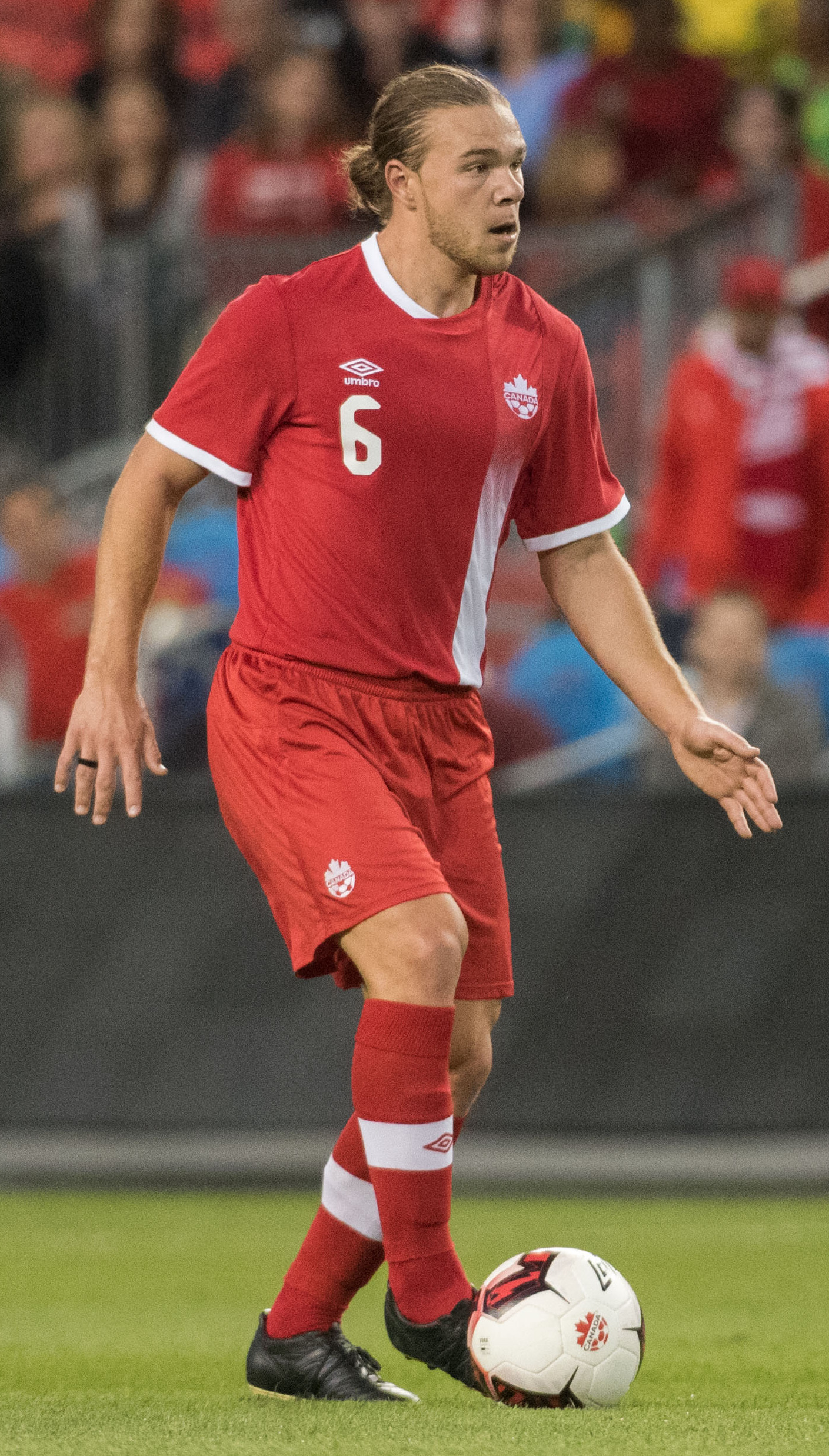
Piette with Canada in 2017

=== Youth teams ===
Piette played for the Canada U17 national team, making his debut in the qualifiers for the 2011 FIFA U-17 World Cup. His team would go on to qualify for the tournament. Piette was also a part of the Canada U23 side, that attempted to qualify for the 2012 Olympics Football tournament, earning three caps. The team did not qualify for London 2012.

=== Senior team ===
Piette was called up to the Canada senior team for the first time for a friendly against Armenia in mid February but failed to see the pitch. He made his senior international debut on 3 June 2012, coming on as an 85th-minute substitute for Julian De Guzman in a 0–0 draw with the United States at BMO Field. This cap made Piette the third youngest player to ever suit up for the Canadian senior side. On 27 June 2013, he was listed as a part of the confirmed 23-man squad for Colin Miller's Canada squad for 2013 CONCACAF Gold Cup.

Piette was called up for the 2015 CONCACAF Gold Cup by Benito Floro in June 2015, as well as the 2017 CONCACAF Gold Cup by Octavio Zambrano. He earned rave reviews for his performance in the 2017 CONCACAF Gold Cup, particularly during group stage matches against Costa Rica and Honduras.

On 30 May 2019, Piette was named to the Canadian squad for the 2019 CONCACAF Gold Cup. On 1 July 2021, he was called up to Canada for the 2021 CONCACAF Gold Cup

In November 2022, Piette was named to Canada's 26-man squad for the 2022 FIFA World Cup. In June 2024, he was named to Canada's squad for the 2024 Copa América.

== Career statistics ==
=== Club ===
As of match played October 31, 2026

Appearances and goals by club, season and competition
Club	Season	League			Playoffs		National cup		Continental		Other		Total	
Club	Season	Division	Apps	Goals	Apps	Goals	Apps	Goals	Apps	Goals	Apps	Goals	Apps	Goals
Fortuna Düsseldorf II	2012–13	Regionalliga West	3	0	—		—		—		—		3	0
Fortuna Düsseldorf II	2013–14	Regionalliga West	28	0	—		—		—		—		28	0
Fortuna Düsseldorf II	Total		31	0	0	0	0	0	0	0	0	0	31	0
Fortuna Düsseldorf	2013–14	2. Bundesliga	2	0	—		0	0	—		—		2	0
Deportivo B	2014–15	Tercera División	26	1	—		—		—		—		26	1
Deportivo B	2015–16	Tercera División	14	1	—		—		—		—		14	1
Deportivo B	Total		40	2	0	0	0	0	0	0	0	0	40	2
Racing de Ferrol (loan)	2015–16	Segunda División B	14	0	—		0	0	—		—		14	0
Izarra	2016–17	Segunda División B	32	0	—		0	0	—		—		32	0
CF Montréal	2017	MLS	11	0	—		0	0	—		—		11	0
CF Montréal	2018	MLS	34	0	—		2	0	—		—		36	0
CF Montréal	2019	MLS	25	0	—		4	0	—		—		29	0
CF Montréal	2020	MLS	22 (Note: Includes three appearances in MLS is Back Tournament group stage)	1	0	0	—		4	0	1 (Note: Appearance in MLS is Back Tournament knockout stage)	0	27	1
CF Montréal	2021	MLS	25	1	—		3	0	—		—		28	1
CF Montréal	2022	MLS	26	0	2	0	2	0	0	0	—		30	0
CF Montréal	2023	MLS	16	0	—		0	0	—		1 (Note: Appearance(s) in Leagues Cup)	0	17	0
CF Montréal	2024	MLS	27	1	1	0	1	0	—		2	0	31	1
CF Montréal	2025	MLS	24	0	—		3	0	—		3	0	30	0
CF Montréal	2026	MLS	21	0	—		3	0	—		—		24	0
CF Montréal	Total		231	3	3	0	18	0	4	0	7	0	263	3
Career total			350	5	3	0	18	0	4	0	7	0	382	5

=== International ===
As of match played October 3, 2026

Appearances and goals by national team and year
National team	Year	Apps	Goals
Canada	2012	1	0
Canada	2013	6	0
Canada	2014	2	0
Canada	2015	12	0
Canada	2016	8	0
Canada	2017	8	0
Canada	2018	3	0
Canada	2019	6	0
Canada	2020	3	0
Canada	2021	11	0
Canada	2022	6	0
Canada	2023	1	0
Canada	2024	2	0
Canada	2025	0	0
Canada	2026	1	0
Total		70	0

== Honours ==
Montreal Impact

- Canadian Championship: 2019, 2021

Individual

- QSF Male Professional Player of the Year: 2018
- QSF Male Senior Player of the Year: 2011, 2015
- QSF Male Youth Player of the Year: 2010, 2012
