= Emanuel Maciel =

Argentine footballer

Personal information
- Full name: Emanuel Fernando Maciel
- Date of birth: 28 March 1997 (age 29)
- Place of birth: José C. Paz, Argentina
- Height: 1.80 m (5 ft 11 in)
- Position: Midfielder

Team information
- Current team: Deportiva Agropecuaria

Youth career
- San Lorenzo

Senior career*
Years	Team	Apps	(Gls)
2019–2020	San Lorenzo	1	(0)
2020–2021	CF Montréal (Note: Montreal Impact changed its name to CF Montréal in 2021)	29	(0)
2022–2023	Aldosivi	30	(0)
2024	Patronato	32	(2)
2025–	Deportiva Agropecuaria		
- * Club domestic league appearances and goals as of 17:26, 22 March 2025 (UTC)

Emanuel Fernando Maciel (born 28 March 1997) is an Argentine professional footballer who plays as a midfielder for Peruvian Segunda División club Deportiva Agropecuaria.

== Career ==
San Lorenzo gave Maciel his beginnings in football, initially in their youth academy. He made a breakthrough into the first-team during 2018–19, as he was on the substitute's bench for two matches in league and cup. Juan Antonio Pizzi selected Maciel for his professional debut in July 2019, as he participated for the full ninety minutes of a Primera División home victory over Godoy Cruz at the Estadio Pedro Bidegain on 27 July. On 11 February 2020, Maciel signed with the Montreal Impact of Major League Soccer on a free transfer. He made his debut in a 4–3 defeat to Toronto FC in the MLS is Back Tournament on 16 July. Following the 2021 season, Maciel was released by Montréal.

On 21 January 2022, Maciel joined Argentine Primera División club Aldosivi on a deal until the end of 2024.

== Career statistics ==
As of 21 December 2020.

Appearances and goals by club, season and competition
Club	Season	League			Cup		League Cup		Continental		Other		Total	
Club	Season	Division	Apps	Goals	Apps	Goals	Apps	Goals	Apps	Goals	Apps	Goals	Apps	Goals
San Lorenzo	2018–19	Primera División	0	0	0	0	0	0	0	0	0	0	0	0
San Lorenzo	2019–20	Primera División	1	0	0	0	0	0	0	0	0	0	1	0
San Lorenzo	Total		1	0	0	0	0	0	0	0	0	0	1	0
Montreal Impact	2020	Major League Soccer	12	0	0	0	—		0	0	0	0	12	0
Career total			13	0	0	0	0	0	0	0	0	0	13	0
