= Mustafa Kizza =

Ugandan footballer (born 1999)

Personal information
- Date of birth: 3 October 1999 (age 27)
- Place of birth: Kibuli, Uganda
- Height: 1.79 m (5 ft 10 in)
- Position: Left back

Team information
- Current team: Nairobi United
- Number: 12

Senior career*
Years	Team	Apps	(Gls)
2017–2020	KCCA	70	(11)
2020–2021	CF Montréal (Note: CF Montréal were known as Montreal Impact until January 2021.)	20	(0)
2022–2023	Arouca	0	(0)
2023–2024	KCCA	6	(1)
2024	Express FC	3	(0)
2024–2025	Telecom Egypt SC	0	(0)
2025–2026	NEC FC	7	(1)
2026 -	Nairobi United	18	(3)

International career^{‡}
2017	Uganda U20	10	(2)
2018	Uganda U23	2	(1)
2019–	Uganda	16	(4)
- * Club domestic league appearances and goals as of 31 July 2025 ‡ National team caps and goals as of 12:28, 31 July 2025 (UTC)

Mustafa Kizza (born 3 October 1999) is a Ugandan footballer who plays for Nairobi United and the Uganda national team as left back.

== Club career ==
=== KCCA FC ===
On 24 February 2017, Kizza was unveiled at Kampala Capital City Authority's ground, Lugogo. Kizza made his senior debut for Kampala Capital City Authority against Bright Stars FC at Phillip Omondi stadium on 3 March 2017. He scored his first goal for Kampala Capital City Authority against Police FC on 15 November 2017 at Phillip Omondi Stadium Lugogo. He appeared in 7 matches for Kampala Capital City Authority.

Kizza played his first game of the season against Bright Stars FC at Phillip Omondi StarTimes Stadium, Kampala Capital City Authority (won 2–1). He scored his first goal of the season against Police FC from Phillip Omondi Stadium Lugoggo. He played 23 matches in the season. Kampala Capital City Authority won the league. Kizza completed the 2018–2019 Uganda Premier League season with 25 assists in that season; 16 in Uganda Premier League, 6 in Caf, 4 Uganda Cup and scored 2 goals in the season.

Kizza played his first game in that season against Maroons FC, he played 24 Uganda Premier League games making 14 Assists; 2 assists in Caf, and scoring 6 goals.

Kizza played his first game of the season against Wakiso Giants FC on 31 August 2019 and scored in that game, Kampala Capital City Authority won 1–0.

On 5th February 2023, Kizza re-joined Kampala Capital City Authority FC on a free transfer after his contract with Arouca ran out.

=== CF Montréal ===
In July 2020, he signed for Montreal Impact (which became known as CF Montréal in 2021). Following the 2021 season, Kizza's contract option was declined by Montréal.

=== Arouca ===
In July 2022, he signed for Portuguese Club F.C. Arouca which plays in the top division Primeira Liga. He was given a three-year contract.

=== Express FC ===
On 11th September 2024, he joined Ugandan giants Express FC on a one year contract only making three appearances for the team.

=== Telecom Egypt SC ===
He joined Telecom Egypt SC in October 2024 after their offer quickly materialized and negotiations were finalized, however he left in less than five months citing unprofessionalism and unfulfilled contractual obligations on the club’s end.

=== NEC FC ===
Mustafa Kizza was announced as new signing for Uganda Premier League’s NEC FC on 31st July 2025 on a two year contract in their quest to strengthen the team squad ahead of the 2025-2026 CAF Confederation’s Cup

=== Nairobi United ===
Mustafah Kizza signed for Nairobi United in January 2026, agreeing to a two-year deal, marking a new chapter in his professional football career as the club aimed to improve its performance in domestic and foreign competitions.

== International career ==
=== Under-20 ===
Kizza played for Uganda U20 during the 2017 COSAFA U-20 Cup in Zambia. He made his debut on 6 December 2017 against Zambia U20 at Arthur Davis Stadium, Kitwe.

=== Under-23 ===
Kizza has played for Uganda U23 during the AFCON U-23 Qualifiers. He made his debut on 14 November 2018 against South Sudan U23 at Star Times Stadium Lugogo; Uganda U23 won the game 1–0 which was scored by Kizza.

=== Senior ===
He made his senior national team debut on 1 June 2019 against Lesotho during the 2019 COSAFA Cup.

== Career statistics ==
=== International goals ===
Scores and results Uganda's goal tally first.

No.	Date	Venue	Opponent	Score	Result	Competition
1.	27 July 2019	El Hadj Hassan Gouled Aptidon Stadium, Djibouti City, Djibouti	Somalia	2–0	3–1	2020 African Nations Championship qualification
2.	21 September 2019	Prince Louis Rwagasore Stadium, Bujumbura, Burundi	Burundi	3–0	3–0	2020 African Nations Championship qualification
3.	11 December 2019	Lugogo Stadium, Kampala, Uganda	Eritrea	1–0	2–0	2019 CECAFA Cup
4.	19 December 2019	Lugogo Stadium, Kampala, Uganda	Eritrea	2–0	2–0	2019 CECAFA Cup

== Honors ==
KCCA

- Uganda Premier League: 2016–17, 2018–19
- Uganda Cup: 2016–17, 2017–18
- CECAFA Clubs Cup: 1; 2019

Individual

- Young Player of the Year: 2016–17
- Airtel FUFA Best eleven: 2017–18
