= Clément Diop =

Senegalese footballer (born 1993)

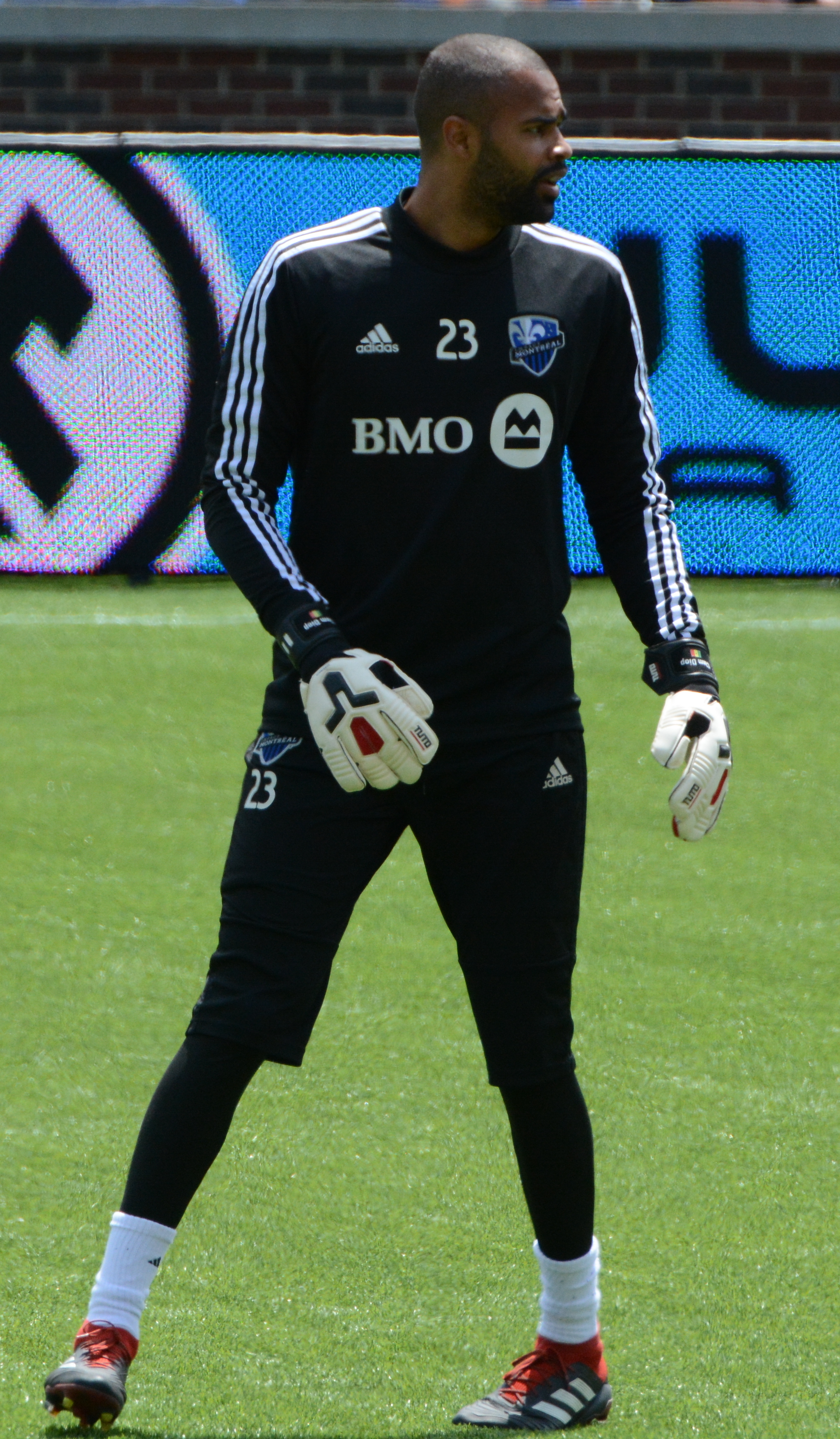
- Diop with CF Montréal in 2019

Personal information
- Full name: Clément Diop Degoud
- Date of birth: 13 October 1993 (age 33)
- Place of birth: Paris, France
- Height: 1.85 m (6 ft 1 in)
- Position: Goalkeeper

Youth career
- 2003–2006: ES Vitry
- 2006–2009: Ivry
- 2009–2011: Amiens

Senior career*
Years	Team	Apps	(Gls)
2011–2014	Amiens II	36	(0)
2011–2014	Amiens	0	(0)
2014–2015	US Camon	0	(0)
2015–2017	LA Galaxy II	49	(0)
2016–2017	LA Galaxy	17	(0)
2018–2021	CF Montréal (Note: Montreal Impact changed its name to CF Montréal in 2021)	30	(0)
2022	Inter Miami	3	(0)
2022	New England Revolution	0	(0)
2023	Atlanta United	2	(0)
2023	Atlanta United 2	5	(0)

International career^{‡}
2017	Senegal	1	(0)
- * Club domestic league appearances and goals as of 17 November 2023 ‡ National team caps and goals as of 9 July 2017

Clément Diop Degoud (born 13 October 1993) is a former professional footballer. Born in France, he represented Senegal internationally.

== Career ==
=== Early career ===
Diop began his career with Amiens where he was a backup for three seasons, but never made a first team appearance. Diop was the starter of Amiens II, Amiens' reserve team for two seasons. Diop made his debut for Amiens II on 25 August 2012, against Calais RUFC, where he came a clean-sheet in a 1–0 win. Diop went on to keep clean-sheets in the following two matches, against Arras and SC Feignies.

=== LA Galaxy ===
On 20 March 2015, it was announced that Diop joined USL club LA Galaxy II for the 2015 season. He made his debut for the club two days later in a 0–0 draw against Real Monarchs SLC. In the 2015 season Diop won the USL Western Conference and reached the USL Championship final with LA Galaxy II. In the finals against Rochester Rhinos, Diop was replaced by Bennett Sneddon late in extra-time. LA Galaxy II lost 2–1 in the final due to a late header from Asani Samuels.

On 16 December 2015, LA Galaxy announced that they had signed Diop to a first team contract for the forthcoming MLS season. On 14 June 2015, Diop made his debut for the first team in fourth round of the U.S. Open Cup against La Máquina FC, where the Galaxy won 4–1 in extra-time.

=== In Montréal ===
Diop moved to CF Montréal (known as the Montreal Impact at the time) via the MLS Waiver Draft following the 2017 season. He signed with the club on 9 January 2018. On 17 August 2021, Montréal and Diop mutually agreed to part ways.

=== Inter Miami ===
In January 2022, Diop signed a one-year contract with an option for a second year with Inter Miami, after having trained with the team since September 2021.

=== New England Revolution ===
On 5 August 2022, Diop was traded to New England Revolution in exchange for $125,000 in General Allocation Money. Following the 2022 season, New England opted to decline his contract option.

=== Atlanta United ===
On 11 January 2023, Diop signed with MLS side Atlanta United FC.

== International career ==
Born in France and of Senegalese descent, Diop originally was called up to the youth national teams for France. Diop debuted for the Senegal national football team in a 0–0 friendly draw with Uganda on 5 June 2017.

== Career statistics ==
As of match played 21 November 2020

Club	Season	League			Cup		Continental		Other		Total	
Club	Season	Division	Apps	Goals	Apps	Goals	Apps	Goals	Apps	Goals	Apps	Goals
Amiens II	2012–13	CFA 2	20	0	0	0	—		—		20	0
Amiens II	2013–14	CFA 2	16	0	0	0	—		—		16	0
Amiens II	Total		36	0	0	0	0	0	0	0	36	0
LA Galaxy II	2015	USL	24	0	—		—		4 (Note: Appearance(s) in USL Playoffs)	0	28	0
LA Galaxy II	2016	USL	22	0	—		—		1	0	23	0
LA Galaxy II	2017	USL	3	0	—		—		—		3	0
LA Galaxy II	Total		49	0	0	0	0	0	5	0	54	0
LA Galaxy	2016	MLS	2	0	3 (Note: Appearance(s) in U.S. Open Cup)	0	—		0	0	5	0
LA Galaxy	2017	MLS	15	0	0	0	—		0	0	15	0
LA Galaxy	Total		17	0	3	0	0	0	0	0	20	0
Montreal Impact	2018	MLS	0	0	2 (Note: Appearance(s) in Canadian Championship)	0	—		—		2	0
Montreal Impact	2019	MLS	2	0	4 (Note: Appearance(s) in Canadian Championship)	0	—		—		6	0
Montreal Impact	2020	MLS	20	0	—		4 (Note: Appearance(s) in CONCACAF Champions League)	0	1 (Note: Appearance(s) in MLS Cup Playoffs)	0	25	0
Montreal Impact	Total		22	0	6	0	4	0	1	0	33	0
Career total			124	0	9	0	4	0	6	0	143	0

== Honours ==
Montreal Impact

- Canadian Championship: 2019
