= 2017 Montreal Impact season =

Montreal Impact
2017 season
- Owner and President: Joey Saputo
- Coach: Mauro Biello
- Canadian Championship: Finals
- Top goalscorer: League: Ignacio Piatti (17); All: Ignacio Piatti (19)
- Highest home attendance: 34,373 (March 11 vs. Seattle Sounders FC)
- Lowest home attendance: 16,005 (September 27 vs. New York City FC)
- Average home league attendance: 20,046
Home colours	Away colours

The 2017 Montreal Impact season was the club's 24th season of existence, and their sixth in Major League Soccer, the top tier of the Canadian soccer pyramid.

== Squad ==
As of August 10, 2017

No.	Name	Nationality	Position	Date of birth (age At Year End)	Previous club
Goalkeepers
1	Evan Bush	US	GK	March 6, 1986 (age 40)	(Canada) Montreal Impact (NASL)
22	Eric Kronberg	US	GK	June 7, 1983 (age 43)	(United States) Sporting Kansas City
40	Maxime Crépeau	CAN	GK	May 11, 1994 (age 32)	(Canada) Montreal Impact Academy
Defenders
2	Ambroise Oyongo	(Cameroon) CAM	LB	June 22, 1991 (age 35)	(United States) New York Red Bulls
3	Daniel Lovitz	(United States) US	LB	August 27, 1991 (age 35)	(Canada) Toronto FC
5	Wandrille Lefèvre	CAN	CB	December 17, 1989 (age 36)	(Canada) Montreal Impact Academy
6	Hassoun Camara	FRA	CB\RB	February 3, 1984 (age 42)	(Canada) Montreal Impact (NASL)
14	Shaun Francis	JAM	LB	September 10, 1991 (age 34)	(United States) San Jose Earthquakes
18	Chris Duvall	USA	RB	September 10, 1991 (age 34)	(United States) Minnesota United FC
23	Laurent Ciman	BEL	CB	August 5, 1985 (age 41)	(Belgium) Standard Liège
26	Kyle Fisher	US	CB	June 19, 1994 (age 32)	(United States) Clemson Tigers
35	Deian Boldor	ROM	CB	February 3, 1995 (age 31)	(Italy) Bologna
36	Víctor Cabrera	ARG	CB	February 7, 1993 (age 33)	(Argentina) River Plate
Midfielders
8	Patrice Bernier	CAN	DM	September 23, 1979 (age 46)	(Denmark) Lyngby Boldklub
10	Ignacio Piatti	ARG	AM	February 4, 1985 (age 41)	(Argentina) San Lorenzo de Almagro
13	Ballou Jean-Yves Tabla	CAN	AM	March 31, 1999 (age 27)	(Canada) FC Montreal
17	David Choinière	CAN	LM	February 7, 1997 (age 29)	(Canada) FC Montreal
25	Louis Béland-Goyette	CAN	DM	September 15, 1994 (age 31)	(Canada) FC Montreal
28	Shamit Shome	CAN	MF	September 5, 1997 (age 29)	(Canada) FC Edmonton
29	Samuel Piette	CAN	DM	November 12, 1994 (age 31)	(Spain) CD Izarra
30	Hernán Bernardello	ARG	DM	August 3, 1986 (age 40)	(Spain) Deportivo Alavés
31	Blerim Džemaili	SUI	AM	April 12, 1986 (age 40)	(Italy) Bologna
33	Marco Donadel	ITA	DM	April 21, 1983 (age 43)	(Italy) Napoli
Attackers
7	Dominic Oduro	GHA	ST	August 13, 1985 (age 41)	(Canada) Toronto FC
15	Andrés Romero	ARG	ST	October 29, 1989 (age 36)	(Brazil) Tombense
19	Michael Salazar	BLZ	ST	October 15, 1992 (age 33)	(United States) UC Riverside Highlanders
21	Matteo Mancosu	ITA	ST	December 22, 1984 (age 41)	(Italy) Bologna F.C. 1909
24	Anthony Jackson-Hamel	CAN	ST	August 3, 1993 (age 33)	(Canada) Montreal Impact Academy
27	Nick DePuy	USA	ST	November 14, 1994 (age 31)	(United States) UC Santa Barbara

=== International roster slots ===
Montreal has ten MLS International Roster Slots for use in the 2017 season. They have the eight allotted from the league and two from trades with D.C. United and Vancouver Whitecaps FC. They traded 1 slot to Vancouver Whitecaps FC on July 21.

Montreal Impact International slots
Slot	Player	Nationality
1	Laurent Ciman	Belgium
2	Marco Donadel	Italy
3	Matteo Mancosu	Italy
4	Ignacio Piatti	Argentina
5	Víctor Cabrera	Argentina
6	Hernán Bernardello	Argentina
7	Andrés Romero	Argentina
8	Blerim Džemaili	Switzerland
9	Deian Boldor	Romania
IR	Ambroise Oyongo	Cameroon

Foreign-Born Players with Domestic Status
Player	Nationality
Dominic Oduro	(Ghana) Ghana^{G}
Wandrille Lefèvre	France / Canada
Michael Salazar	Belize ^{G}
Shaun Francis	Jamaica ^{G}
Hassoun Camara	France ^{C}

- (Canada) – Player is Canadian citizen;
- (United States) – Player is US citizen;
- G – Player has US green card;
- C – Player has permanent Canadian residency.

== Player movement ==
=== In ===
Per Major League Soccer and club policies terms of the deals do not get disclosed.

No.	Pos.	Player	Transferred from	Fee/notes	Date	Source
13	MF	(Canada) Ballou Jean-Yves Tabla	(Canada) FC Montreal	Signed as a Homegrown Player	October 20, 2016	
25	MF	(Canada) Louis Béland-Goyette	(Canada) FC Montreal	Signed as a Homegrown Player	November 10, 2016	
18	DF	(United States) Chris Duvall	(United States) Minnesota United FC	Traded for Johan Venegas + General Allocation Money	December 13, 2016	
27	FW	(United States) Nick DePuy	(United States) UC Santa Barbara	MLS SuperDraft	January 13, 2017	
28	MF	(Canada) Shamit Shome	(Canada) FC Edmonton	MLS SuperDraft	January 13, 2017	
3	DF	(United States) Daniel Lovitz	(Canada) Toronto FC	Free Transfer	February 28, 2017	
21	FW	(Italy) Matteo Mancosu	(Italy) Bologna F.C. 1909	Free Transfer	March 2, 2017	
14	DF	(Jamaica) Shaun Francis	(United States) San Jose Earthquakes	Traded for a 2nd round draft pick + General Allocation Money	July 13, 2017	
29	MF	(Canada) Samuel Piette	(Spain) CD Izarra	Free Transfer	August 3, 2017	

=== Out ===
No.	Pos.	Player	Transferred to	Fee/notes	Date	Source
11	FW	(Ivory Coast) Didier Drogba	(United States) Phoenix Rising FC	Free Transfer	December 2, 2016	
3	DF	(United States) Amadou Dia	(United States) Phoenix Rising FC	Optioned not picked up	December 2, 2016	
18	MF	(Canada) Kyle Bekker	(United States) San Francisco Deltas	Optioned not picked up	December 9, 2016	
28	MF	(Canada) Jérémy Gagnon-Laparé	(France) AS Vitré	Optioned not picked up	December 9, 2016	
32	MF	(Argentina) Lucas Ontivero	(Turkey) Galatasaray S.K.	Loan Ended	December 9, 2016	
29	FW	(Jamaica) Romario Williams	(United States) Atlanta United FC	Traded for a conditional 2018 MLS SuperDraft pick	December 11, 2016	
25	DF	(United States) Donny Toia	(United States) Atlanta United FC	Selected in 2016 MLS Expansion Draft	December 13, 2016	
27	MF	(Costa Rica) Johan Venegas	(United States) Minnesota United FC	Traded for Chris Duvall	December 13, 2016	
14	MF	(United States) Harry Shipp	(United States) Seattle Sounders FC	Traded for General Allocation Money	December 22, 2016	
14	MF	(Argentina) Adrián Arregui	(Argentina) Club Atlético Temperley	Loan Ended	June 16, 2017	
16	MF	(Scotland) Calum Mallace	(United States) Seattle Sounders FC	Traded for a 4th round 2019 MLS SuperDraft pick	June 16, 2017	

=== Loans in ===
No.	Pos.	Player	Loaned from	Loan start date	Loan end date	Source
14	MF	(Argentina) Adrián Arregui	(Argentina) Temperley	February 22, 2017	June 16, 2017	
31	MF	(Switzerland) Blerim Džemaili	(Italy) Bologna F.C. 1909	May 9, 2017	December 31, 2017	
35	DF	(Romania) Deian Boldor	(Italy) Bologna F.C. 1909	July 20, 2017	June 30, 2018	

=== Loans out ===
No.	Pos.	Player	Loaned to	Loan start date	Loan end date	Source
19	FW	(Belize) Michael Salazar	(Canada) Ottawa Fury FC	May 2, 2017	December 31, 2017	
27	FW	(United States) Nick DePuy	(Canada) Ottawa Fury FC	May 12, 2017	December 31, 2017	

=== Draft picks ===
Round	No.	Pos.	Player	College/Club team	Transaction	Source
1(19)	27	FW	(United States) Nick DePuy	(United States) UC Santa Barbara	Signed prior to the draft	
2(41)	28	MF	(Canada) Shamit Shome	(Canada) FC Edmonton	Signed to a Generation Adidas deal	
3(63)	Passed					
4(85)	Passed					

== International caps ==
Players called for senior international duty during the 2017 season while under contract with the Montreal Impact.

Nationality	Position	Player	Competition	Date	Opponent	Minutes played	Score
Cameroon	DF	Ambroise Oyongo	Friendly	January 5, 2017	v Congo	90'	2–0
Cameroon	DF	Ambroise Oyongo	Friendly	January 10, 2017	v Zimbabwe	62'	1–1
Belize	FW	Michael Salazar	Copa Centroamericana	January 13, 2017	v Panama	89'	0–0
Cameroon	DF	Ambroise Oyongo	Africa Cup of Nations group stage	January 14, 2017	v Burkina Faso	90'	1–1
Belize	FW	Michael Salazar	Copa Centroamericana	January 15, 2017	v Costa Rica	90'	0–3
Belize	FW	Michael Salazar	Copa Centroamericana	January 17, 2017	v El Salvador	90'	1–3
Cameroon	DF	Ambroise Oyongo	Africa Cup of Nations group stage	January 18, 2017	v Guinea-Bissau	90'	2–1
Belize	FW	Michael Salazar	Copa Centroamericana	January 20, 2017	v Nicaragua	45'	1–3
Belize	FW	Michael Salazar	Copa Centroamericana	January 22, 2017	v Honduras	28'	0–1
Cameroon	DF	Ambroise Oyongo	Africa Cup of Nations group stage	January 22, 2017	v Gabon	90'	0–0
Canada	FW	Anthony Jackson-Hamel	Friendly	January 22, 2017	v Bermuda	90'	4–2
Canada	DF	Wandrille Lefèvre	Friendly	January 22, 2017	v Bermuda	45'	4–2
Cameroon	DF	Ambroise Oyongo	Africa Cup of Nations Quarterfinals	January 28, 2017	v Senegal	90'	0–0
Cameroon	DF	Ambroise Oyongo	Africa Cup of Nations Semi-finals	February 2, 2017	v Ghana	90'	2–0
Cameroon	DF	Ambroise Oyongo	Africa Cup of Nations Final	February 5, 2017	v Egypt	90'	2–1
Cameroon	DF	Ambroise Oyongo	Friendly	March 24, 2017	v Tunisia	90'	1–0
Belgium	DF	Laurent Ciman	2018 FIFA World Cup qualification	March 25, 2017	v Greece	84'	1–1
Switzerland	MF	Blerim Džemaili	2018 FIFA World Cup qualification	June 9, 2017	v Faroe Islands	86'	2–0
Cameroon	DF	Ambroise Oyongo	Africa Cup of Nations group stage	June 10, 2017	v Morocco	30'	1–0
Canada	MF	Patrice Bernier	Friendly	June 13, 2017	v Curaçao	79'	2–1
Canada	FW	Anthony Jackson-Hamel	Friendly	June 13, 2017	v Curaçao	29'	2–1
Canada	MF	Patrice Bernier	CONCACAF Gold Cup group stage	July 7, 2017	v French Guiana	66'	4–2
Canada	FW	Anthony Jackson-Hamel	CONCACAF Gold Cup group stage	July 7, 2017	v French Guiana	7'	4–2
Canada	GK	Maxime Crépeau	CONCACAF Gold Cup group stage	July 7, 2017	v French Guiana	26'	4–2
Canada	FW	Anthony Jackson-Hamel	CONCACAF Gold Cup group stage	July 11, 2017	v Costa Rica	57'	1–1
Canada	MF	Patrice Bernier	CONCACAF Gold Cup group stage	July 14, 2017	v Honduras	65'	0–0
Canada	FW	Anthony Jackson-Hamel	CONCACAF Gold Cup quarter-finals	July 20, 2017	v Jamaica	8'	1–2
Jamaica	DF	Shaun Francis	CONCACAF Gold Cup quarter-finals	July 20, 2017	v Canada	67'	2–1
Jamaica	DF	Shaun Francis	CONCACAF Gold Cup Semi-finals	July 23, 2017	v Mexico	53'	1–0
Canada	FW	Anthony Jackson-Hamel	Friendly	September 2, 2017	v Jamaica	45'	2–0
Canada	MF	Samuel Piette	Friendly	September 2, 2017	v Jamaica	90'	2–0
Jamaica	DF	Shaun Francis	Friendly	September 2, 2017	v Canada	29'	0–2
Switzerland	MF	Blerim Džemaili	2018 FIFA World Cup qualification	September 3, 2017	v Latvia	90'	3–0
Jamaica	DF	Shaun Francis	Friendly	October 7, 2017	v Saudi Arabia	90'	2–5
Canada	FW	Anthony Jackson-Hamel	Friendly	October 8, 2017	v Jamaica	38'	0–1
Canada	MF	Samuel Piette	Friendly	October 8, 2017	v Jamaica	90'	0–1
Belgium	DF	Laurent Ciman	2018 FIFA World Cup qualification	October 10, 2017	v Cyprus	90'	4–0
Switzerland	MF	Blerim Džemaili	2018 FIFA World Cup qualification	October 10, 2017	v Portugal	66'	0–2
Switzerland	MF	Blerim Džemaili	2018 FIFA World Cup qualification	November 9, 2017	v Northern Ireland	83'	1–0
Belgium	DF	Laurent Ciman	Friendly	November 10, 2017	v Mexico	90'	3–3
Switzerland	MF	Blerim Džemaili	2018 FIFA World Cup qualification	November 12, 2017	v Northern Ireland	61'	0–0

== Friendlies ==
=== Pre-season ===
Win Draw Loss

MD	Date, KO EST	Venue	Opponent	Res. F–A	Att.	Goalscorers and disciplined players		Ref.
MD	Date, KO EST	Venue	Opponent	Res. F–A	Att.	Montreal Impact	Opponent	Ref.
1	February 3; 10:00 a.m.	A	South Florida Bulls	2-0		Ciman (yellow card) 42'; DePuy 58', 89'		
2	February 15; 11:00 a.m.	A	Chicago Fire	1-4		Donadel (yellow card) 23'; Tabla (yellow card) 30'; Ciman (yellow card) 52'; Piatti 88' (pen.)	Accam 1'; McCarty 15'; Fisher 18' (o.g.); Nikolić 64'	
3	February 18; 5:00 p.m.	A	D.C. United	4-2		Oduro 6'; Piatti 21' (pen.); Mancosu 53'; Jackson-Hamel 90'	Birnbaum 14'; Cabrera 56' (o.g.); Kamara (yellow card) 90'	
4	February 22; 7:00 p.m.	A	Philadelphia Union	2-2		Bernier (yellow card) 22'; DePuy 68'; Jackson-Hamel 90'	Fabinho (yellow card) 28'; Ilsinho 34'; Sapong 82'	
5	February 25; 7:30 p.m.	A	Tampa Bay Rowdies	1-2		Piatti 71' (pen.); Cabrera (yellow card) 89'	Cole 34'; Brown 40'; Hristov (yellow card) 74'; Vingaard (yellow card) 77'	

=== Mid-season ===
Win Draw Loss

MD	Date, KO EST	Venue	Opponent	Res. F–A	Att.	Goalscorers and disciplined players		Ref.
MD	Date, KO EST	Venue	Opponent	Res. F–A	Att.	Montreal Impact	Opponent	Ref.
1	July 12; 7:00 p.m.	A	Ottawa Fury FC	1-0		Mallace 2'		

== Major League Soccer ==
=== Tables ===
==== Eastern Conference ====
Pos	Team	Pld	W	L	T	GF	GA	GD	Pts
7	New England Revolution	34	13	15	6	53	61	−8	45
8	Philadelphia Union	34	11	14	9	50	47	+3	42
9	Montreal Impact	34	11	17	6	52	58	−6	39
10	Orlando City SC	34	10	15	9	39	58	−19	39
11	D.C. United	34	9	20	5	31	60	−29	32

Source: MLS

==== Overall ====
Pos	Team	Pld	W	L	T	GF	GA	GD	Pts
15	New England Revolution	34	13	15	6	53	61	−8	45
16	Philadelphia Union	34	11	14	9	50	47	+3	42
17	Montreal Impact	34	11	17	6	52	58	−6	39
18	Orlando City SC	34	10	15	9	39	58	−19	39
19	Minnesota United FC	34	10	18	6	47	70	−23	36

Source: MLS
Rules for classification: 1) points; 2) total wins; 3) total goal differential; 4) total goals scored; 5) disciplinary points; 6) away goals scored; 7) away goal differential; 8) coin toss or drawing of lots

=== Results summary ===
Overall								Home						Away					
Pld	Pts	W	L	D	GF	GA	GD	W	L	D	GF	GA	GD	W	L	D	GF	GA	GD
34	39	11	17	6	52	58	−6	8	8	1	30	25	+5	3	9	5	22	33	−11

Last updated: October 22, 2017
Source: 2017 Major League Soccer season
Pld = Matches played; Pts = Points; W = Matches won; D = Matches drawn; L = Matches lost; GF = Goals for; GA = Goals against; GD = Goal difference

=== Fixtures & results ===
Win Draw Loss

MD	Date KO EST	Venue	Opponent	Res. F–A	Att.	Goalscorers and disciplined players		Ref.
MD	Date KO EST	Venue	Opponent	Res. F–A	Att.	Montreal Impact	Opponent	Ref.
1	March 4; 10:00 p.m.	A	San Jose Earthquakes	0-1	18,000	Duvall (yellow card) 14'; Camara (yellow card) 45+1' (yellow-red card) 66'; Mancosu (yellow card) 83'	Godoy 17'; Alashe (yellow card) 35'; Salinas (yellow card) 90+2'	
2	March 11; 7:00 p.m.	H	Seattle Sounders FC	2-2	34,373	Ciman (yellow card) 11'; Mancosu 17' (yellow card) 65'; Piatti 51'	Lodeiro 83' (pen.); Bruin 90+4'	
3	March 18; 2:00 p.m.	A	New York City FC	1-1	18,515	Bernardello (yellow card) 57'; Oduro 68'	Wallace 44'; Chanot (yellow card) 86'	
4	April 1; 3:00 p.m.	A	Chicago Fire	2-2	15,103	Duvall (yellow card) 57'; Arregui (yellow card) 60'; Mancosu 61'; Cabrera (yellow card) 76' (red card) 80'; Lovitz (yellow card) 78'; Tabla 90'	Schweinsteiger 17'; Juninho (yellow card) 41' (yellow-red card) 71'; Solignac 90+3'	
5	April 7; 10:30 p.m.	A	LA Galaxy	0-2	19,058	Donadel (red card) 44'; Tabla (yellow card) 64'	Alessandrini 15'; Pedro (yellow card) 54'; Jones 74'	
6	April 15; 1:00 p.m.	H	Atlanta United FC	2-1	17,144	Cabrera (yellow card) 13'; Piatti (yellow card) 45+1' (goal) 45+5' (pen.); Jackson-Hamel 90+3'	Jones 40'; Pírez (red card) 45+4'; Kann (yellow card) 90+1'	
7	April 22; 1:00 p.m.	A	Philadelphia Union	3-3	15,107	Piatti 41' (yellow card) 65'; Jackson-Hamel 69' 87'	Alberg 5' 39' (pen.) (yellow card) 56'; Sapong 23'; Gaddis (yellow card) 43'; Bedoya (yellow card) 71'	
8	April 29; 3:00 p.m.	H	Vancouver Whitecaps FC	1-2	19,597	Donadel 9' (yellow card) 59'; Fisher (yellow card) 28'; Bernardello (yellow card) 41'; Oduro (yellow card) 90+4'	Jacobson 29'; Laba (yellow card) 65'; Techera 79'	
9	May 6; 6:00 p.m.	A	D.C. United	1-0	14,993	Tabla 13'; Bernardello (yellow card) 45'; Lovitz (yellow card) 50'; Fisher (yellow card) 59'		
10	May 13; 5:00 p.m.	H	Columbus Crew SC	2-3	17,508	Piatti 52'; Tabla (yellow card) 57'; Jackson-Hamel 77'; Duvall (yellow card) 89'	Meram 14' 28' 90+1'; Jahn (yellow card) 31'; Steffen (yellow card) 52'; Higuaín (yellow card) 58'	
11	May 20; 3:00 p.m.	H	Portland Timbers	4-1	19,138	Piatti 13' (pen.) 50'; Ciman (yellow card) 22'; Fisher 43'; Donadel (yellow card) 51'; Tabla (yellow card) 66'; Oyongo 77'	Chará (red card) 18'; Guzmán (yellow card) 27'; Valeri 45+1'; Miller (yellow card) 71'	
12	June 3; 7:30 p.m.	H	New York Red Bulls	1-0	19,032	Džemaili (yellow card) 57' (goal) 67'; Bernier (yellow card) 75'; Lovitz (yellow card) 80'	Lawrence (yellow card) 41'	
13	June 10; 8:00 p.m.	A	Sporting Kansas City	1-1	20,334	Piatti (yellow card) 45+1'; Mancosu 82' (yellow card) 84'; Duvall (red card) 86'	Gerso 24'	
14	June 17; 7:30 p.m.	A	Orlando City SC	3-3	25,527	Džemaili 16' (yellow card) 45+2'; Ciman (yellow card) 18'; Lovitz (yellow card) 52'; Piatti 58' 59'	García 8' (yellow card) 89'; Rivas 23'; Aja (yellow card) 60'; Spector 90+4'	
15	June 24; 7:30 p.m.	A	Columbus Crew SC	1-4	16,592	Fisher (yellow card) 16'; Jackson-Hamel 19'; Camara (yellow card) 34'	Higuaín 17' 88'; Meram (yellow card) 45+1'; Manneh 70'; Kamara 72'; Afful (yellow card) 78'	
16	July 1; 7:00 p.m.	H	D.C. United	2-0	18,707	Džemaili 21'; Tabla (yellow card) 22'; Duvall 23'; Mancosu (yellow card) 25'; Camara (yellow card) 82'; Bush (yellow card) 89'	Sam (yellow card) 45+1'	
17	July 5; 8:30 p.m.	A	Houston Dynamo	1-3	15,470	Salazar (yellow card) 4'; Džemaili (yellow card) 31'; Bernardello (yellow card) 79'; Salazar 89'	Wenger 1'; Leonardo (yellow card) 12'; Alex 23'; Clark (yellow card) 25'; Rodriguez 67'	
18	July 19; 7:30 p.m.	H	Philadelphia Union	2-1	16,660	Salazar 19'; Béland-Goyette (yellow card) 32'; Džemaili 51'; Bernardello (yellow card) 90+4'	Alberg (yellow card) 29'; Picault 43'; Gaddis (yellow card) 45'; Elliott (yellow card) 77'; Onyewu (yellow card) 90+3'	
19	July 22; 7:30 p.m.	H	FC Dallas	1-2	20,481	Salazar 23'; Mancosu (yellow card) 43'	Figueroa (yellow card) 44'; Colmán 52' 62'; Grana (yellow card) 55'; Ulloa (yellow card) 66'	
20	July 29; 7:30 p.m.	A	New York Red Bulls	0-4	22,251	Ciman (yellow card) 90+2'	Royer 23' (pen.) 89'; Long (yellow card) 57'; Murillo 58'; Wright-Phillips 85'	
21	August 5; 7:30 p.m.	H	Orlando City SC	2-1	20,801	Piatti 48' (pen.); Jackson-Hamel 84'	Larin 12'	
22	August 12; 8:00 p.m.	A	Philadelphia Union	3-0	15,297	Duvall (yellow card) 47'; Džemaili 69' 90+5'; Piette (yellow card) 84'; Piatti 90+1' (pen.)		
23	August 16; 7:30 p.m.	H	Chicago Fire	3-0	19,894	Piatti 6' 38'; Cabrera (yellow card) 20'; Mancosu 37' (pen.); Duvall (yellow card) 48'; Piette (yellow card) 78'	Lampson (yellow card) 36'	
24	August 19; 7:30 p.m.	H	Real Salt Lake	3-1	19,541	Piatti 11' 29'; Jackson-Hamel 47'; Bush (yellow card) 62'	Silva 26' (yellow card) 78'; Lennon (yellow card) 39'; Sunny (yellow card) 45+3'; Wingert (yellow card) 57'; Beltran (yellow card) 66'; Horst (yellow card) 85'	
25	August 27; 4:30 p.m.	H	Toronto FC	1-3	20,801	Dzemaili (yellow card) 45+2'; Cabrera (yellow card) 74'; Ciman (yellow card) 89'; Piatti 90+2'	Giovinco 41', 90+3'; Altidore 52'; Zavaleta (yellow card) 78'	
26	September 2; 7:00 p.m.	H	Chicago Fire	0-1	19,619	Boldor (red card) 52'; Donadel (yellow card) 70'; Bush (yellow card) 90+6'	Juninho (yellow card) 38'; Schweinsteiger 49' de Leeuw (yellow card) 90+2'	
27	September 9; 7:30 p.m.	A	New England Revolution	0-1	20,080	Béland-Goyette (yellow card) 35'	Nguyen 68' (yellow card) 90+1'	
28	September 16; 7:30 p.m.	H	Minnesota United FC	2-3	20,801	Bernier 9'; Džemaili (yellow card) 53' (goal) 55'; Piette (yellow card) 62'; Cabrera (yellow card) 90+3'	Martin (yellow card) 2'; Molino 20' (pen.); Ramirez 60'; Danladi 89'	
29	September 20; 7:30 p.m.	A	Toronto FC	5-3	28,898	Piatti 10' 24'; Donadel 12'; Jackson-Hamel 47' 51'	Boldor 42' (o.g.); Ricketts 77' 79'	
30	September 24; 5:00 p.m.	A	Atlanta United FC	0-2	43,502		Villalba 28'; Larentowicz 73'	
31	September 27; 7:30 p.m.	H	New York City FC	0-1	16,005	Džemaili (yellow card) 40'	Harrison 29'; Brillant (yellow card) 33'; Struna (yellow card) 45'; Ring (yellow card) 73'; Callens (yellow card) 74'	
32	September 30; 9:00 p.m.	A	Colorado Rapids	1-2	15,791	Lovitz (red card) 32'; Mancosu 62'	Watts (red card) 12'; Aigner 45+3'; Ford (yellow card) 48'; Gordon 81' (yellow card) 82'	
33	October 15; 3:00 p.m.	A	Toronto FC	0-1	27,866	Camara (yellow card) 23'; Džemaili (yellow card) 29'; Crépeau (yellow card) 45+3'; Cabrera (yellow card) 59'	Altidore 16'; Bradley (yellow card) 26'; Cheyrou (yellow card) 90'	
34	October 22; 4:00 p.m.	H	New England Revolution	2-3	20,681	Ciman (yellow card) 43'; Bernier 45+3' (pen.); Romero (yellow card) 51'; Džemaili (yellow card) 62'; Mancosu 90'	Fagúndez 19'; Angoua (yellow card) 45+3'; Németh 46'; Tierney (yellow card) 84'; Rowe 90+6'	

== Canadian Championship ==
=== Tournament bracket ===
Preliminary round
NASL Edmonton	0	2	2
USL Ottawa	1	3	4

Semifinals
USL Ottawa	2	0	2
MLS Toronto	1	4	5
MLS Montreal	1	4	5
MLS Vancouver	2	2	4

Final
MLS Toronto	1	2	3
MLS Montreal	1	1	2

=== Canadian Championship results ===
Win Draw Loss

Leg	Date KO EST	Venue	Opponent	Res. F–A	Agg. score F–A	Att.	Goalscorers and disciplined player		Ref.
Leg	Date KO EST	Venue	Opponent	Res. F–A	Agg. score F–A	Att.	Montreal Impact	Opponent	Ref.
Semi–Final
FL	May 23; 10:00 p.m.	A	Vancouver Whitecaps FC	1-2	—	16,831	Choinière 62'	Davies 13'; Mezquida 33'	
SL	May 30; 7:30 p.m.	H	Vancouver Whitecaps FC	4-2	5-4	15,213	Piatti 20' (pen.) 28' (pen.); Džemaili 38'; Donadel (yellow card) 43'; Jackson-Hamel 61'; Duvall (yellow card) 80'; Ciman (yellow card) 90+3'	Richey (yellow card) 19'; Davies 59'; Greig 77'	
Finals
FL	June 21; 7:30 p.m.	H	Toronto FC	1-1	—	14,329	Mancosu 19'; Duvall (yellow card) 32'; Tabla (yellow card) 82'; Donadel (yellow card) 84'; Džemaili (yellow card) 90'	Altidore 30'; Hamilton (yellow card) 45+2'; Zavaleta (yellow card) 64'; Mavinga (yellow card) 89'	
SL	June 27; 7:30 p.m.	A	Toronto FC	1-2	2-3	26,539	Tabla 36'; Fisher (yellow card) 45+2'; Bernardello (yellow card) 59'; Bernier (red card) 89'	Giovinco 53' 90+5'; Edwards (yellow card) 90+6'	

== Statistics ==
=== Appearances, minutes played, and goals scored ===
No.	Nat.	Player	Total			Major League Soccer			Canadian Championship			MLS Playoffs			Ref.
No.	Nat.	Player	App.	Min.	Gls	App.	Min.	Gls	App.	Min.	Gls	App.	Min.	Gls	Ref.
Goalkeepers
1	(United States)	Evan Bush	31	2790	0	31	2790	0	0	0	0	0	0	0	
22	(United States)	Eric Kronberg	0	0	0	0	0	0	0	0	0	0	0	0	
40	(Canada)	Maxime Crépeau	6	540	0	3	270	0	4	360	0	0	0	0	
Defenders
2	(Cameroon)	Ambroise Oyongo	12	1080	1	11	990	1	1	90	0	0	0	0	
3	(United States)	Daniel Lovitz	28	1877	0	25	1750	0	3	127	0	0	0	0	
5	(Canada)	Wandrille Lefèvre	6	189	0	3	103	0	3	86	0	0	0	0	
6	(France)	Hassoun Camara	21	1575	0	18	1350	0	3	225	0	0	0	0	
14	(Jamaica)	Shaun Francis	6	376	0	6	376	0	0	0	0	0	0	0	
18	(United States)	Chris Duvall	30	2480	1	27	2210	1	3	270	0	0	0	0	
23	(Belgium)	Laurent Ciman	34	3060	0	30	2700	0	4	360	0	0	0	0	
26	(United States)	Kyle Fisher	23	1725	1	20	1455	1	3	270	0	0	0	0	
35	(Romania)	Deian Boldor	5	412	0	5	412	0	0	0	0	0	0	0	
36	(Argentina)	Víctor Cabrera	21	1585	0	20	1496	0	1	89	0	0	0	0	
Midfielders
8	(Canada)	Patrice Bernier	31	2062	2	27	1801	2	4	261	0	0	0	0	
10	(Argentina)	Ignacio Piatti	31	2628	19	28	2368	17	3	260	2	0	0	0	
13	(Canada)	Ballou Jean-Yves Tabla	24	1360	3	21	1155	2	3	205	1	0	0	0	
17	(Canada)	David Choinière	4	123	1	3	34	0	1	90	1	0	0	0	
25	(Canada)	Louis Béland-Goyette	6	293	0	6	293	0	0	0	0	0	0	0	
27	(Canada)	Shamit Shome	1	8	0	1	8	0	0	0	0	0	0	0	
29	(Canada)	Samuel Piette	11	960	0	11	960	0	0	0	0	0	0	0	
30	(Argentina)	Hernán Bernardello	26	1856	0	23	1586	0	3	270	0	0	0	0	
31	(Switzerland)	Blerim Džemaili	23	2026	8	21	1851	7	2	175	1	0	0	0	
33	(Italy)	Marco Donadel	21	1615	2	19	1435	2	2	180	0	0	0	0	
Forwards
7	(Ghana)	Dominic Oduro	28	1629	1	25	1439	1	3	190	0	0	0	0	
15	(Argentina)	Andrés Romero	10	450	0	9	432	0	1	18	0	0	0	0	
19	(Belize)	Michael Salazar	17	690	3	17	690	3	0	0	0	0	0	0	
21	(Italy)	Matteo Mancosu	28	1925	7	26	1745	6	2	180	1	0	0	0	
24	(Canada)	Anthony Jackson-Hamel	23	1245	10	21	1134	9	2	111	1	0	0	0	
27	(United States)	Nick DePuy	6	142	0	5	128	0	1	14	0	0	0	0	
No Longer with the Club
14	(Argentina)	Adrián Arregui	8	311	0	6	238	0	2	73	0	0	0	0	
16	(Scotland)	Calum Mallace	8	353	0	7	298	0	1	55	0	0	0	0	
Last updated: October 22, 2017

=== Top scorers ===
Rank	Nat.	Player	Pos.	MLS	Canadian Champ	MLS Playoffs	TOTAL
1	(Argentina)	Ignacio Piatti	MF	17	2		19
2	(Canada)	Anthony Jackson-Hamel	FW	9	1		10
3	(Switzerland)	Blerim Džemaili	MF	7	1		8
4	(Italy)	Matteo Mancosu	FW	6	1		7
5	(Canada)	Ballou Jean-Yves Tabla	MF	2	1		3
5	(Belize)	Michael Salazar	MF	3			3
7	(Italy)	Marco Donadel	MF	2			2
7	(Canada)	Patrice Bernier	MF	2			2
9	(Cameroon)	Ambroise Oyongo	DF	1			1
9	(Ghana)	Dominic Oduro	FW	1			1
9	(Canada)	David Choinière	DF		1		1
9	(United States)	Chris Duvall	DF	1			1
9	(United States)	Kyle Fisher	DF	1			1
Totals				52	7	0	59

Updated to match played October 22, 2017
Source: Montreal Impact
Italic: denotes player left the club during the season.

=== Top assists ===
No.	Nat.	Player	Pos.	MLS	Canadian Champ	MLS Playoffs	TOTAL
31	(Switzerland)	Blerim Džemaili	MF	10	1		11
10	(Argentina)	Ignacio Piatti	MF	6			6
24	(Canada)	Anthony Jackson-Hamel	FW	4	1		5
8	(Canada)	Patrice Bernier	MF	4			4
30	(Argentina)	Hernán Bernardello	MF	3			3
18	(United States)	Chris Duvall	DF	2			2
19	(Belize)	Michael Salazar	FW	3			3
21	(Italy)	Matteo Mancosu	FW	2			2
2	(Cameroon)	Ambroise Oyongo	DF	1			1
3	(United States)	Daniel Lovitz	DF	1	1		2
13	(Canada)	Ballou Jean-Yves Tabla	MF	2			2
14	(Argentina)	Adrián Arregui	MF	1			1
23	(Belgium)	Laurent Ciman	DF	1			1
25	(Canada)	Louis Béland-Goyette	MF	1			1
29	(Canada)	Samuel Piette	MF	1			1
33	(Italy)	Marco Donadel	MF	1			1
Totals				42	3	0	45

Updated to match played October 22, 2017
Source: Montreal Impact
Italic: denotes player left the club during the season.

=== Multi–goal games ===
No.	Pos.	Player	Date	Opponent	Goals	Source
24	FW	(Canada) Anthony Jackson-Hamel	April 22, 2017	vs Philadelphia Union	2	
10	MF	(Argentina) Ignacio Piatti	May 20, 2017	vs Portland Timbers	2	
10	MF	(Argentina) Ignacio Piatti	May 30, 2017	vs Vancouver Whitecaps FC	2	
10	MF	(Argentina) Ignacio Piatti	June 17, 2017	vs Orlando City SC	2	
31	MF	(Switzerland) Blerim Džemaili	August 12, 2017	vs Philadelphia Union	2	
10	MF	(Argentina) Ignacio Piatti	August 16, 2017	vs Chicago Fire Soccer Club	2	
10	MF	(Argentina) Ignacio Piatti	August 19, 2017	vs Real Salt Lake	2	
10	MF	(Argentina) Ignacio Piatti	September 20, 2017	vs Toronto FC	2	
24	FW	(Canada) Anthony Jackson-Hamel	September 20, 2017	vs Toronto FC	2	

=== Goals against average ===
No.	Nat.	Player	Total			Major League Soccer			Canadian Championship			MLS Playoffs		
No.	Nat.	Player	MIN	GA	GAA	MIN	GA	GAA	MIN	GA	GAA	MIN	GA	GAA
1	US	Evan Bush	2790	50	1.61	2790	50	1.61	0	0	0.00	0	0	0.00
22	US	Eric Kronberg	0	0	0.00	0	0	0.00	0	0	0.00	0	0	0.00
40	CAN	Maxime Crépeau	630	14	2.00	270	7	2.33	360	7	1.75	0	0	0.00

Updated to match played October 22, 2017
Source: Montreal Impact
Italic: denotes player left the club during the season.

=== Clean sheets ===
No.	Nat.	Player	MLS	Canadian Champ	MLS Cup Playoffs	TOTAL
1	(United States)	Evan Bush	5			5
Totals			5	0	0	5

Updated to match played August 17, 2017
Source: Montreal Impact

=== Top minutes played ===
No.	Nat.	Player	Pos.	MLS	Canadian Champ	TOTAL
23	(Belgium)	Laurent Ciman	DF	2700	360	3060
1	(United States)	Evan Bush	GK	2790		2790
10	(Argentina)	Ignacio Piatti	MF	2368	260	2628
18	(United States)	Chris Duvall	DF	2210	270	2480
8	(Canada)	Patrice Bernier	MF	1801	261	2062
31	(Switzerland)	Blerim Džemaili	MF	1851	175	2026
21	(Italy)	Matteo Mancosu	FW	1745	180	1925
3	(United States)	Daniel Lovitz	DF	1750	127	1877
30	(Argentina)	Hernán Bernardello	MF	1586	270	1856
26	(United States)	Kyle Fisher	DF	1455	270	1725

Updated to match played October 23, 2017
Source: Montreal Impact
Italic: denotes player left the club during the season.

=== Yellow and red cards ===
No.	Player	Total			Major League Soccer			Canadian Championship			MLS Cup Playoffs			Ref.
No.	Player	Booked	(yellow card) (red card)	Sent off (straight red)	Booked	(yellow card) (red card)	Sent off (straight red)	Booked	(yellow card) (red card)	Sent off (straight red)	Booked	(yellow card) (red card)	Sent off (straight red)	Ref.
1	Evan Bush	3	0	0	3	0	0	0	0	0	0	0	0	
2	Ambroise Oyongo	0	0	0	0	0	0	0	0	0	0	0	0	
3	Daniel Lovitz	4	0	1	4	0	1	0	0	0	0	0	0	
5	Wandrille Lefèvre	0	0	0	0	0	0	0	0	0	0	0	0	
6	Hassoun Camara	4	1	0	4	1	0	0	0	0	0	0	0	
7	Dominic Oduro	1	0	0	1	0	0	0	0	0	0	0	0	
8	Patrice Bernier	1	0	1	1	0	0	0	0	1	0	0	0	
10	Ignacio Piatti	4	0	0	4	0	0	0	0	0	0	0	0	
13	Ballou Jean-Yves Tabla	5	0	0	4	0	0	1	0	0	0	0	0	
14	Shaun Francis	0	0	0	0	0	0	0	0	0	0	0	0	
15	Andrés Romero	1	0	0	1	0	0	0	0	0	0	0	0	
17	David Choinière	0	0	0	0	0	0	0	0	0	0	0	0	
18	Chris Duvall	7	0	1	5	0	1	2	0	0	0	0	0	
19	Michael Salazar	1	0	0	1	0	0	0	0	0	0	0	0	
21	Matteo Mancosu	5	0	0	5	0	0	0	0	0	0	0	0	
22	Eric Kronberg	0	0	0	0	0	0	0	0	0	0	0	0	
23	Laurent Ciman	6	0	0	5	0	0	1	0	0	0	0	0	
24	Anthony Jackson-Hamel	0	0	0	0	0	0	0	0	0	0	0	0	
25	Louis Béland-Goyette	2	0	0	2	0	0	0	0	0	0	0	0	
26	Kyle Fisher	4	0	0	3	0	0	1	0	0	0	0	0	
27	Nick DePuy	0	0	0	0	0	0	0	0	0	0	0	0	
28	Shamit Shome	0	0	0	0	0	0	0	0	0	0	0	0	
29	Samuel Piette	3	0	0	3	0	0	0	0	0	0	0	0	
30	Hernán Bernardello	6	0	0	5	0	0	1	0	0	0	0	0	
31	Blerim Džemaili	9	0	0	8	0	0	1	0	0	0	0	0	
33	Marco Donadel	5	0	1	3	0	1	2	0	0	0	0	0	
35	Deian Boldor	0	0	1	0	0	1	0	0	0	0	0	0	
36	Víctor Cabrera	6	0	1	6	0	1	0	0	0	0	0	0	
40	Maxime Crépeau	1	0	0	1	0	0	0	0	0	0	0	0	
	Adrián Arregui	1	0	0	1	0	0	0	0	0	0	0	0	
	Calum Mallace	0	0	0	0	0	0	0	0	0	0	0	0	
Totals		78	1	6	70	1	5	8	0	1	0	0	0	
Last updated: October 22, 2017

== Recognition ==
=== MLS Player of the Month ===
Month	Player	Nation	Position	Report
AUG	Piatti	Argentina	MF	MLS Player of the Month: AUG

=== MLS Player of the Week ===
Week	Player	Nation	Position	Report
24	Piatti	Argentina	MF	MLS Player of the Week: 24

=== MLS Team of the Week ===
Week	Player	Nation	Position	Report
2	Piatti	Argentina	MF	MLS Team of the Week: 2
3	Bernier	Canada	MF	MLS Team of the Week: 3
12	Piatti	Argentina	MF	MLS Team of the Week: 12
16	Piatti	Argentina	MF	MLS Team of the Week: 16
18	Džemaili	Switzerland	MF	MLS Team of the Week: 18
22	Džemaili	Switzerland	MF	MLS Team of the Week: 22
23	Džemaili	Switzerland	MF	MLS Team of the Week: 23
23	Piette	Canada	MF	MLS Team of the Week: 23
24	Džemaili	Switzerland	MF	MLS Team of the Week: 24
24	Piatti	Argentina	MF	MLS Team of the Week: 24
24	Jackson-Hamel	Canada	FW	MLS Team of the Week: 24

=== MLS Goal of the Week ===
Week	Player	Nation	Position	Report
7	Jackson-Hamel	Canada	FW	MLS Goal of the Week: 7
14	Džemaili	Switzerland	MF	MLS Goal of the Week: 14
18	Džemaili	Switzerland	MF	MLS Goal of the Week: 18

=== Save of the Week ===
Week	Player	Nation	Position	Report
11	Bush	United States	GK	MLS Save of the Week: 11
16	Bush	United States	GK	MLS Save of the Week: 16
