= 2018 Montreal Impact season =

Montreal Impact
2018 season
- Owner and President: Joey Saputo
- Coach: Rémi Garde
- Major League Soccer: Conference: 7th Overall: 15th
- MLS Cup Playoffs: Did not qualify
- Canadian Championship: Semi-finals
- Top goalscorer: League: Ignacio Piatti (16); All: Ignacio Piatti (16)
- Highest home attendance: 26,005 (March 17 vs. Toronto FC)
- Lowest home attendance: 15,485 (July 14 vs. San Jose Earthquakes)
- Average home league attendance: 18,574
Home colours	Away colours

The 2018 Montreal Impact season was the club's 25th season of existence, and their seventh in Major League Soccer, the top tier of the Canadian soccer pyramid.

== Squad ==
As of August 13, 2018

No.	Name	Nationality	Position	Date of birth (age At Year End)	Previous club
Goalkeepers
1	Evan Bush	US	GK	March 6, 1986 (age 40)	(Canada) Montreal Impact (NASL)
23	Clément Diop	SEN	GK	October 12, 1993 (age 32)	(United States) LA Galaxy
40	Jason Beaulieu	CAN	GK	February 12, 1994 (age 32)	(United States) New Mexico Lobos
41	James Pantemis	CAN	GK	February 21, 1997 (age 29)	(Canada) FC Montreal
Defenders
2	Víctor Cabrera	ARG	CB	February 7, 1993 (age 33)	(Argentina) River Plate
3	Daniel Lovitz	(United States) US	LB	August 27, 1991 (age 35)	(Canada) Toronto FC
4	Rudy Camacho	FRA	CB	March 5, 1991 (age 35)	(Belgium) Waasland-Beveren
5	Zakaria Diallo	FRA	CB	August 11, 1986 (age 40)	(France) Stade Brestois 29
15	Rod Fanni	FRA	CB	December 6, 1981 (age 44)	(France) Olympique de Marseille
18	Chris Duvall	USA	RB	September 10, 1991 (age 35)	(United States) Minnesota United FC
22	Jukka Raitala	FIN	LB	September 15, 1988 (age 38)	(United States) Los Angeles FC
24	Michael Petrasso	CAN	RB	July 9, 1995 (age 31)	(England) Queens Park Rangers F.C.
26	Kyle Fisher	US	CB	June 19, 1994 (age 32)	(United States) Clemson Tigers
33	Bacary Sagna	FRA	RB	February 14, 1983 (age 43)	(Italy) Benevento
Midfielders
6	Samuel Piette	CAN	DM	November 12, 1994 (age 31)	(Spain) CD Izarra
8	Saphir Taïder	ALG	DM	February 29, 1992 (age 34)	(Italy) Bologna
9	Alejandro Silva	URU	AM	September 4, 1989 (age 37)	(Argentina) Lanús
10	Ignacio Piatti	ARG	AM	February 4, 1985 (age 41)	(Argentina) San Lorenzo de Almagro
13	Ken Krolicki	JPN	DM	March 16, 1996 (age 30)	(United States) Michigan State Spartans
16	Jeisson Vargas	CHI	AM	December 15, 1997 (age 28)	(Chile) Universidad Católica
17	David Choinière	CAN	LM	February 7, 1997 (age 29)	(Canada) FC Montreal
25	Louis Béland-Goyette	CAN	DM	September 15, 1994 (age 32)	(Canada) FC Montreal
28	Shamit Shome	CAN	AM	September 5, 1997 (age 29)	(Canada) FC Edmonton
29	Mathieu Choinière	CAN	AM	February 7, 1999 (age 27)	(Canada) Montreal Impact Academy
32	Micheal Azira	UGA	DM	August 22, 1987 (age 39)	(United States) Colorado Rapids
Attackers
11	Anthony Jackson-Hamel	CAN	ST	August 3, 1993 (age 33)	(Canada) Montreal Impact Academy
19	Michael Salazar	BLZ	ST	November 15, 1992 (age 33)	(United States) UC Riverside
21	Matteo Mancosu	ITA	ST	December 22, 1984 (age 41)	(Italy) Bologna F.C. 1909
30	Quincy Amarikwa	USA	ST	October 29, 1987 (age 38)	(United States) San Jose Earthquakes

=== International roster slots ===
Montreal has Nine MLS International Roster Slots for use in the 2018 season. They have the eight allotted from the league and three from trades with Orlando City SC, Portland Timbers and San Jose Earthquakes.

Montreal Impact International slots
Slot	Player	Nationality
1	Ignacio Piatti	Argentina
2	Víctor Cabrera	Argentina
3	Jukka Raitala	Finland
4	Matteo Mancosu	Italy
5	Jeisson Vargas	Chile
6	Saphir Taïder	Algeria
7	Rudy Camacho	France
8	Rod Fanni	France
9	Alejandro Silva	Uruguay
10	Bacary Sagna	France
11	Zakaria Diallo	France

Foreign-Born Players with Domestic Status
Player	Nationality
Michael Salazar	Belize ^{G}
Clément Diop	Senegal ^{G}
Ken Krolicki	Japan ^{G}
Micheal Azira	Uganda ^{G}

- (Canada) – Player is Canadian citizen;
- (United States) – Player is US citizen;
- G – Player has US green card;
- C – Player has permanent Canadian residency.

== Player movement ==
=== In ===
Per Major League Soccer and club policies terms of the deals do not get disclosed.

No.	Pos.	Player	Transferred from	Fee/notes	Date	Source
15	DF	(Canada) Thomas Meilleur-Giguère	(Canada) Ottawa Fury FC	Signed as a Homegrown Player	November 13, 2017	
41	GK	(Canada) James Pantemis	(Canada) FC Montreal	Signed as a Homegrown Player	November 13, 2017	
14	DF	(Canada) Raheem Edwards	(United States) Los Angeles FC	Traded for Laurent Ciman	December 12, 2017	
22	DF	(Finland) Jukka Raitala	(United States) Los Angeles FC	Traded for Laurent Ciman	December 12, 2017	
23	GK	(Senegal) Clément Diop	(United States) LA Galaxy	MLS Waiver Draft	December 13, 2017	
40	GK	(Canada) Jason Beaulieu	(United States) New Mexico Lobos	Signed as a Homegrown Player	January 9, 2018	
24	DF	(Canada) Michael Petrasso	(England) Queens Park Rangers F.C.	Free Transfer	January 18, 2018	
5	DF	(France) Zakaria Diallo	(France) Stade Brestois 29	Free Transfer	January 20, 2018	
16	MF	(Chile) Jeisson Vargas	(Chile) Universidad Católica	Free Transfer	January 22, 2018	
13	MF	(Japan) Ken Krolicki	(United States) Michigan State Spartans	MLS Superdraft	February 28, 2018	
15	DF	(France) Rod Fanni	(France) Olympique de Marseille	Free Transfer	March 5, 2018	
9	MF	(Uruguay) Alejandro Silva	(Argentina) Lanús	Transfer Fee	March 19, 2018	
4	DF	(France) Rudy Camacho	(Belgium) Waasland-Beveren	Transfer Fee	March 22, 2018	
29	MF	(Canada) Mathieu Choinière	(Canada) Montreal Impact Academy	Signed as a Homegrown Player	July 17, 2018	
30	FW	(United States) Quincy Amarikwa	(United States) San Jose Earthquakes	Traded for Dominic Oduro	August 8, 2018	
32	MF	(Uganda) Micheal Azira	(United States) Colorado Rapids	Traded for 4th round MLS SuperDraft pick in 2020	August 8, 2018	
33	DF	(France) Bacary Sagna	(Italy) Benevento	Free Transfer	August 8, 2018	

=== Out ===
No.	Pos.	Player	Transferred to	Fee/notes	Date	Source
8	MF	(Canada) Patrice Bernier	Retired		October 24, 2017	
6	DF	(France) Hassoun Camara	Retired		November 16, 2017	
30	MF	(Argentina) Hernán Bernardello	(Argentina) Newell's Old Boys	Option Declined	November 16, 2017	
2	DF	(Cameroon) Ambroise Oyongo	(France) Montpellier HSC	Free Agent	November 16, 2017	
22	GK	(United States) Eric Kronberg	Retired		November 16, 2017	
14	DF	(Jamaica) Shaun Francis	(United States) Louisville City FC	Option Declined	November 16, 2017	
15	FW	(Argentina) Andrés Romero	Retired		November 16, 2017	
23	DF	(Belgium) Laurent Ciman	(United States) Los Angeles FC	Traded for Raheem Edwards and Jukka Raitala	December 12, 2017	
5	DF	(Canada) Wandrille Lefèvre	Retired		January 18, 2018	
35	DF	(Romania) Deian Boldor	(Italy) Hellas Verona F.C.	Waived	January 18, 2018	
31	MF	(Switzerland) Blerim Džemaili	(Italy) Bologna F.C. 1909	Loan Ended	January 20, 2018	
13	MF	(Canada) Ballou Tabla	(Spain) FC Barcelona	Undisclosed fee	January 25, 2018	
33	MF	(Italy) Marco Donadel	Retired		June 22, 2018	
14	MF	(Canada) Raheem Edwards	(United States) Chicago Fire	Transferred for $400,000 TAM	July 17, 2018	
7	FW	(Ghana) Dominic Oduro	(United States) San Jose Earthquakes	Traded for Quincy Amarikwa	August 8, 2018	
27	FW	(United States) Nick DePuy	(United States) LA Galaxy II	Waived	August 16, 2018	

=== Loans in ===
No.	Pos.	Player	Loaned from	Loan start date	Loan end date	Source
8	MF	(Algeria) Saphir Taïder	(Italy) Bologna F.C. 1909	January 22, 2018	December 31, 2019	
30	MF	(Canada) Clément Bayiha	(Canada) Ottawa Fury FC	July 24, 2018	July 26, 2018	

=== Loans out ===
No.	Pos.	Player	Loaned to	Loan start date	Loan end date	Source
40	GK	(Canada) Maxime Crépeau	(Canada) Ottawa Fury FC	January 21, 2018	December 31, 2018	
27	FW	(United States) Nick DePuy	(Denmark) Fremad Amager	January 31, 2018	April 30, 2018	
19	FW	(Belize) Michael Salazar	(Canada) Ottawa Fury FC	March 1, 2018	June 7, 2018	
15	DF	(Canada) Thomas Meilleur-Giguère	(Canada) Ottawa Fury FC	March 1, 2018	December 31, 2018	
28	MF	(Canada) Shamit Shome	(Canada) Ottawa Fury FC	March 20, 2018	April 5, 2018	
24	DF	(Canada) Michael Petrasso	(Canada) Ottawa Fury FC	August 31, 2018	December 31, 2018	

=== Draft picks ===
Round	No.	Pos.	Player	College/Club team	Transaction	Source
1(4)	Traded for $200,000 in General Allocation Money					
1(7)	Traded for $150,000 in Targeted Allocation Money					
3(53)	13	MF	(Japan) Ken Krolicki	(United States) Michigan State Spartans	Signed	
3(60)	Passed					
4(76)	Passed					

== International caps ==
Players called for senior international duty during the 2018 season while under contract with the Montreal Impact.

Nationality	Position	Player	Competition	Date	Opponent	Minutes played	Score
Belize	FW	Michael Salazar	Friendly	March 22, 2018	v Grenada	90'	4–2
Canada	MF	Samuel Piette	Friendly	March 24, 2018	v New Zealand	90'	1–0
Canada	DF	Michael Petrasso	Friendly	March 24, 2018	v New Zealand	45'	1–0
Canada	DF	Raheem Edwards	Friendly	March 24, 2018	v New Zealand	15'	1–0
Finland	DF	Jukka Raitala	Friendly	June 9, 2018	v Belarus	64'	2–0
Finland	DF	Jukka Raitala	UEFA Nations League	September 8, 2018	v Hungary	90'	1–0
Algeria	MF	Saphir Taïder	Africa Cup of Nations qualification	September 8, 2018	v Gambia	90'	1–1
Canada	MF	Samuel Piette	CONCACAF Nations League qualifying	September 9, 2018	v US Virgin Islands	90'	8–0
Finland	DF	Jukka Raitala	UEFA Nations League	September 11, 2018	v Estonia	90'	1–0
Finland	DF	Jukka Raitala	UEFA Nations League	October 12, 2018	v Estonia	90'	1–0
Algeria	MF	Saphir Taïder	Africa Cup of Nations qualification	October 12, 2018	v Benin	90'	2–0
Finland	DF	Jukka Raitala	UEFA Nations League	October 15, 2018	v Greece	90'	2–0
Algeria	MF	Saphir Taïder	Africa Cup of Nations qualification	November 18, 2018	v Togo	21'	4–1
Canada	MF	Samuel Piette	CONCACAF Nations League qualifying	November 18, 2018	v Saint Kitts and Nevis	90'	1–0

== Friendlies ==
=== Pre-season ===
Win Draw Loss

MD	Date, KO EST	Venue	Opponent	Res. F–A	Att.	Goalscorers and disciplined players		Ref.
MD	Date, KO EST	Venue	Opponent	Res. F–A	Att.	Montreal Impact	Opponent	Ref.
1	February 10; 11:00 p.m.	A	Las Vegas Lights FC	2-0	9,334	Mancosu (yellow card) 39'; Lovitz (yellow card) 41'; Salazar 64'; Ferriño 66' (o.g.); Choinière (yellow card) 77'	Huiqui (yellow card) 19'; Mendoza (yellow card) 43'; Ferriño (red card) 68'	
2	February 14; 7:00 p.m.	A	Chicago Fire	2-1		Piatti 34'; Mancosu (yellow card) 37' (goal) 42'; Krolicki (yellow card) 53'; Lovitz (yellow card) 70'	Vincent (yellow card) 36'; Lillard (yellow card) 40'; McCarty 55'; Dean (yellow card) 87'; Castro (yellow card) 89'	
3	February 17; 7:30 p.m.	A	Tampa Bay Rowdies	2-1		Edwards (yellow card) 32'; Taïder 44'; Petrasso (yellow card) 61'; Piatti 77'	Hristov (yellow card) 32'; Graf 75'	
4	February 21; 7:30 p.m.	A	Philadelphia Union	0-5		Donadel (yellow card) 45'	Sapong 12' (pen.) 49'; Accam 42' (yellow card) 45'; Trusty 53'; Simpson 76'	
5	February 24; 11:00 p.m.	A	New York City FC	2-2		Taïder 51'; Piatti 55'; Mancosu (yellow card) 69'; Krolicki (yellow card) 69'; Cabrera (yellow card) 87'	Villa 12' 50' (yellow card) 70'; Medina (yellow card) 31'; Callens (yellow card) 35'; Tinnerholm (yellow card) 66'	

=== Mid-season ===
Win Draw Loss

MD	Date, KO EST	Venue	Opponent	Res. F–A	Att.	Goalscorers and disciplined players		Ref.
MD	Date, KO EST	Venue	Opponent	Res. F–A	Att.	Montreal Impact	Opponent	Ref.
1	September 7; 7:00 p.m.	A	Ottawa Fury FC	1-0		Bayiha 36'; Choinière (yellow card) 77'	Manesio (yellow card) 45'	

== Major League Soccer ==
=== Tables ===
==== Eastern Conference ====
Pos	Team	Pld	W	L	T	GF	GA	GD	Pts	Qualification
5	Columbus Crew	34	14	11	9	43	45	−2	51	MLS Cup Knockout Round
6	Philadelphia Union	34	15	14	5	49	50	−1	50	MLS Cup Knockout Round
7	Montreal Impact	34	14	16	4	47	53	−6	46	
8	New England Revolution	34	10	13	11	49	55	−6	41	
9	Toronto FC	34	10	18	6	59	64	−5	36	

Source: MLS

==== Overall ====
Pos	Team	Pld	W	L	T	GF	GA	GD	Pts	Qualification
13	LA Galaxy	34	13	12	9	66	64	+2	48	
14	Vancouver Whitecaps FC	34	13	13	8	54	67	−13	47	
15	Montreal Impact	34	14	16	4	47	53	−6	46	
16	New England Revolution	34	10	13	11	49	55	−6	41	
17	Houston Dynamo	34	10	16	8	58	58	0	38	CONCACAF Champions League

Source: MLS
Rules for classification: 1) points; 2) total wins; 3) total goal differential; 4) total goals scored; 5) disciplinary points; 6) away goals scored; 7) away goal differential; 8) coin toss or drawing of lots

=== Results summary ===
Overall								Home						Away					
Pld	Pts	W	L	D	GF	GA	GD	W	L	D	GF	GA	GD	W	L	D	GF	GA	GD
34	46	14	16	4	47	53	−6	11	4	2	31	16	+15	3	12	2	16	37	−21

Last updated: October 29, 2018
Source: 2018 Major League Soccer season
Pld = Matches played; Pts = Points; W = Matches won; D = Matches drawn; L = Matches lost; GF = Goals for; GA = Goals against; GD = Goal difference

=== Fixtures & results ===
Win Draw Loss

MD	Date KO EST	Venue	Opponent	Res. F–A	Att.	Goalscorers and disciplined players		Ref.
MD	Date KO EST	Venue	Opponent	Res. F–A	Att.	Montreal Impact	Opponent	Ref.
1	March 4; 6:00 p.m.	A	Vancouver Whitecaps FC	1-2	27,837	Cabrera (yellow card) 32'; Mancosu 89' (yellow card) 90+2'	Juárez (yellow card) 11'; Watson (yellow card) 37'; Kamara 63'; Davies 70'	
2	March 10; 1:00 p.m.	A	Columbus Crew SC	2-3	11,098	Krolicki (yellow card) 32'; Piatti 59'; Edwards 85'	Higuaín 12' (pen.); Zardes 15' 90+4' (pen.); Steffen (yellow card) 51'	
3	March 17; 3:00 p.m.	H	Toronto FC	1-0	26,005	Piette (yellow card) 32'; Krolicki (yellow card) 38'; Vargas 41' (yellow card) 53'; Cabrera (yellow card) 90+4'; Donadel (yellow card) 90+6'	Bradley (yellow card) 35'	
4	March 31; 10:00 a.m.	A	Seattle Sounders FC	1-0	39,469	Lovitz (yellow card) 41'; Krolicki (yellow card) 47'; Vargas 60'; Piette (yellow card) 83'	Leerdam (red card) 40'; Torres (yellow card) 71'	
5	April 6; 7:30 p.m.	A	New England Revolution	0-4	10,908	Taïder (red card) 13'; Raitala (yellow card) 89'	Bunbury 20'; Farrell 45+6'; Fagundez 71'; Zahibo 80'; Caicedo (yellow card) 85'	
6	April 14; 1:00 p.m.	A	New York Red Bulls	1-3	15,017	Vargas 33'	Wright-Phillips 5'; Gamarra 57'; Murillo 76'	
7	April 21; 1:00 p.m.	H	Los Angeles FC	3-5	20,302	Piatti 9' 16' (pen.) (yellow card) 25' (goal) 43'; Cabrera (red card) 31'; Silva (yellow card) 84'	Miller (yellow card) 15'; Ciman 24'; Feilhaber 52'; Raitala 57' (o.g.); Vela 83' (pen.); Blessing 89'	
8	April 28; 1:00 p.m.	A	Atlanta United FC	1-4	45,039	Taïder 13' (yellow card) 83'; Piette (yellow card) 35'; Bush (yellow card) 60'; Duvall (yellow card) 68'	Pírez (yellow card) 56'; Garza (yellow card) 59'; Almirón 70' (pen.) (yellow card) 81' (goal) 84'; Kratz 78' 90+4'	
9	May 5; 1:00 p.m.	H	New England Revolution	4-2	15,622	Duvall (yellow card) 38'; Jackson-Hamel 45+2' 52'; Edwards 62'; Piatti 68'	Caicedo (yellow card) 59'; Zahibo 78' 86'; Fagúndez (yellow card) 90+1'	
10	May 9; 8:30 p.m.	A	Chicago Fire	0-1	10,067	Petrasso (yellow card) 65'	Vincent (yellow card) 66'; Adams (yellow card) 70'; Ellis 89'	
11	May 12; 3:00 p.m.	H	Philadelphia Union	0-2	17,140	Silva (yellow card) 65'; Lovitz (red card) 67'; Piette (yellow card) 77'	Burke 43' (red card) 58'; McKenzie (yellow card) 71'; Medunjanin 88'	
12	May 21; 3:00 p.m.	H	LA Galaxy	0-1	20,801	Petrasso (yellow card) 41'; Donadel (yellow card) 68'; Raitala (yellow card) 71'	Lletget (yellow card) 22'; Kitchen (yellow card) 37'; Ibrahimović (red card) 41'; Kamara 75'; Bingham (yellow card) 87'	
13	May 26; 8:00 p.m.	A	Minnesota United FC	0-2	21,331	Edwards (yellow card) 20'	Gómez (yellow card) 20'; Calvo (yellow card) 44'; Ramirez 52'; Ibarra 58'	
14	June 2; 7:30 p.m.	H	Houston Dynamo	1-0	17,512	Vargas 44'; Edwards (yellow card) 65'	Elis (yellow card) 29'; Gil (yellow card) 33'; Lundqvist (yellow card) 69'; Martínez (yellow card) 84'	
15	June 9; 8:00 p.m.	A	FC Dallas	0-2	13,506	Duvall (yellow card) 22'; Camacho (yellow card) 77'; Lovitz (yellow card) 90+4'	Mancosu 5' (o.g.); Díaz 18' (pen.); Gruezo (yellow card) 25'; González (yellow card) 90+2'	
16	June 13; 7:30 p.m.	H	Orlando City SC	3-0	15,621	Piatti 5' (pen.) 90+2'; Tarek 55' (o.g.)	Dwyer (yellow card) 17'; Higuita (yellow card) 19'; Rosell (yellow card) 49'	
17	June 23; 7:30 p.m.	A	Orlando City SC	2-0	24,398	Sané 13' (o.g.); Piatti 84'	Kljestan (yellow card) 58'	
18	June 30; 7:00 p.m.	H	Sporting Kansas City	2-0	16,142	Krolicki (yellow card) 19'; Duvall (yellow card) 46'; Piatti 54'; Silva 70' (pen.)	Croizet (yellow card) 68'; Opara (yellow card) 69'	
19	July 7; 7:30 p.m.	H	Colorado Rapids	2-1	16,030	Taïder 55' 56'	Badji 78'; Wilson (yellow card) 90+3'	
20	July 11; 7:00 p.m.	A	New York City FC	0-3	18,706	Edwards (yellow card) 23'	McNamara (yellow card) 11'; Tinnerholm (yellow card) 21'; Medina 60'; Matarrita 65'; Lewis 76'	
21	July 14; 7:30 p.m.	H	San Jose Earthquakes	2-0	15,485	Taïder 8'; Krolicki (yellow card) 37'; Piatti 74'; Silva (yellow card) 85'	Godoy (yellow card) 26'; Lima (yellow card) 59'; Wondolowski (yellow card) 90'	
22	July 21; 11:00 p.m.	A	Portland Timbers	2-2	21,144	Piette (yellow card) 19'; Taïder 23'; Mancosu 41'	Armenteros 39'; Valeri 65'	
23	July 28; 7:00 p.m.	H	Atlanta United FC	1-2	19,064	Piatti 87'	Escobar (yellow card) 23'; Martínez 31' 57'; Parkhurst (yellow card) 77'	
24	August 4; 7:30 p.m.	H	D.C. United	1-1	19,152	Piatti (yellow card) 2'; Mancosu 5'	Asad 70'; Canouse (yellow card) 75'; Birnbaum (yellow card) 78'	
25	August 11; 10:00 p.m.	A	Real Salt Lake	1-1	18,901	Raitala 55'; Lovitz (yellow card) 66'	Plata 26' (pen.); Baird (yellow card) 74'	
26	August 18; 7:30 p.m.	H	Chicago Fire	2-1	18,831	Piatti 6' (pen.); Camacho (yellow card) 24'; Sagna (yellow card) 68'; Lovitz 90+1'	Corrales (yellow card) 41'; Nikolić 70'; McCarty (yellow card) 80'	
27	August 25; 8:00 p.m.	A	Toronto FC	1-3	27,294	Silva 30'; Sagna (yellow card) 63'	Giovinco 7' 22'; Osorio 29'	
28	September 1; 7:30 p.m.	H	New York Red Bulls	3-0	18,458	Fanni 30'; Sagna 38'; Piatti 90+3'		
29	September 15; 7:30 p.m.	A	Philadelphia Union	4-1	18,024	Silva (yellow card) 21' (goal) 28' 76'; Taider 39'; Piatti 90+3'	Trusty 11'; Elliott (yellow card) 42'; Burke (yellow card) 56'	
30	September 22; 7:30 p.m.	H	New York City FC	1-1	20,801	Azira 27' (yellow card) 49'; Taïder (yellow card) 90+3'	Camacho 17' (o.g.); Callens (yellow card) 57'; Chanot (yellow card) 78'; Matarrita (yellow card) 79'	
31	September 29; 7:00 p.m.	A	D.C. United	0-5	20,573		Acosta 17'; Rooney 48' 82'; Arriola 61' 78'	
32	October 6; 7:30 p.m.	H	Columbus Crew SC	3-0	19,015	Taïder 32' (pen.); Silva 44'; Piatti 59'; Azira (yellow card) 62'	Santos (yellow card) 45+2'; Mensah (yellow card) 90'	
33	October 21; 3:00 p.m.	H	Toronto FC	2-0	19,684	Sagna (yellow card) 38'; Piatti 74' (pen.) 89'	Osorio (yellow card) 45'	
34	October 28; 4:30 p.m.	A	New England Revolution	0-1	28,832	Taïder (yellow card) 90+2'	Rowe (yellow card) 69'; Fagúndez 74' (yellow card) 75'; Farrell (yellow card) 83'; Zahibo (yellow card) 89'	

== Canadian Championship ==
=== Tournament bracket ===
First qualifying round June 6–13
L1O	Oakville Blue Devils	1	0	1
PLSQ	AS Blainville	2	1	3

Second qualifying round June 20–27
USL	Ottawa Fury FC	1	1	2
PLSQ	AS Blainville	0	0	0

Semi-finals; July 18–25
MLS	Toronto FC	1	3	4
USL	Ottawa Fury FC	0	0	0
MLS	Vancouver Whitecaps FC	0	2	2
MLS	Montreal Impact	1	0	1

Final; August 8–15
MLS	Toronto FC	2	5	7
MLS	Vancouver Whitecaps FC	2	2	4

=== Canadian Championship results ===
Win Draw Loss

Leg	Date KO EST	Venue	Opponent	Res. F–A	Agg. score F–A	Att.	Goalscorers and disciplined player		Ref.
Leg	Date KO EST	Venue	Opponent	Res. F–A	Agg. score F–A	Att.	Montreal Impact	Opponent	Ref.
Semi–Final
FL	July 18	H	Vancouver Whitecaps FC	1-0	—		Silva 58'	Norman Jr. (yellow card) 41'; Shea (yellow card) 87'	
SL	July 25	A	Vancouver Whitecaps FC	0-2	1-2	19,267	Silva (yellow card) 65'; Piette (yellow card) 90+1'	Reyna 19'; Watson (yellow card) 21'; Henry (yellow card) 33'; Kamara 60' (pen.)	

== Statistics ==
=== Appearances, minutes played, and goals scored ===
No.	Nat.	Player	Total			Major League Soccer			Canadian Championship			MLS Playoffs			Ref.
No.	Nat.	Player	App.	Min.	Gls	App.	Min.	Gls	App.	Min.	Gls	App.	Min.	Gls	Ref.
Goalkeepers
1	(United States)	Evan Bush	34	3060	0	34	3060	0	0	0	0	0	0	0	
23	(Senegal)	Clément Diop	2	180	0	0	0	0	2	180	0	0	0	0	
40	(Canada)	Jason Beaulieu	0	0	0	0	0	0	0	0	0	0	0	0	
41	(Canada)	James Pantemis	0	0	0	0	0	0	0	0	0	0	0	0	
Defenders
2	(Argentina)	Víctor Cabrera	15	1100	0	13	920	0	2	180	0	0	0	0	
3	(United States)	Daniel Lovitz	33	2803	1	31	2650	1	2	153	0	0	0	0	
4	(France)	Rudy Camacho	19	1656	0	18	1566	0	1	90	0	0	0	0	
5	(France)	Zakaria Diallo	0	0	0	0	0	0	0	0	0	0	0	0	
15	(France)	Rod Fanni	27	2380	1	26	2290	1	1	90	0	0	0	0	
18	(United States)	Chris Duvall	15	1195	0	15	1195	0	0	0	0	0	0	0	
22	(Finland)	Jukka Raitala	30	2432	1	28	2290	1	2	142	0	0	0	0	
24	(Canada)	Michael Petrasso	16	910	0	14	782	0	2	128	0	0	0	0	
26	(United States)	Kyle Fisher	0	0	0	0	0	0	0	0	0	0	0	0	
33	(France)	Bacary Sagna	9	810	1	9	810	1	0	0	0	0	0	0	
Midfielders
6	(Canada)	Samuel Piette	36	3180	0	34	3000	0	2	180	0	0	0	0	
8	(Algeria)	Saphir Taïder	35	3028	7	33	2852	7	2	176	0	0	0	0	
9	(Uruguay)	Alejandro Silva	33	2485	6	31	2368	5	2	117	1	0	0	0	
10	(Argentina)	Ignacio Piatti	34	2876	16	32	2821	16	2	55	0	0	0	0	
13	(Japan)	Ken Krolicki	26	1683	0	24	1598	0	2	95	0	0	0	0	
16	(Chile)	Jeisson Vargas	21	1051	4	19	871	4	2	180	0	0	0	0	
17	(Canada)	David Choinière	1	12	0	1	12	0	0	0	0	0	0	0	
25	(Canada)	Louis Béland-Goyette	4	109	0	4	109	0	0	0	0	0	0	0	
28	(Canada)	Shamit Shome	6	334	0	5	249	0	1	85	0	0	0	0	
29	(Canada)	Mathieu Choinière	6	86	0	5	82	0	1	4	0	0	0	0	
32	(Uganda)	Michael Azira	10	723	1	10	723	1	0	0	0	0	0	0	
Forwards
11	(Canada)	Anthony Jackson-Hamel	17	651	2	16	580	2	1	71	0	0	0	0	
19	(Belize)	Michael Salazar	0	0	0	0	0	0	0	0	0	0	0	0	
21	(Italy)	Matteo Mancosu	21	1267	3	20	1213	3	1	64	0	0	0	0	
30	(United States)	Quincy Amarikwa	10	644	1	10	644	1	0	0	0	0	0	0	
No Longer with the Club
7	(Ghana)	Dominic Oduro	5	32	0	5	32	0	0	0	0	0	0	0	
14	(Canada)	Raheem Edwards	14	808	2	14	808	2	0	0	0	0	0	0	
27	(United States)	Nick DePuy	0	0	0	0	0	0	0	0	0	0	0	0	
30	(Canada)	Clément Bayiha	0	0	0	0	0	0	0	0	0	0	0	0	
33	(Italy)	Marco Donadel	2	96	0	2	96	0	0	0	0	0	0	0	
Last updated: October 29, 2018

=== Top scorers ===
Rank	Nat.	Player	Pos.	MLS	Canadian Champ	MLS Playoffs	TOTAL
1	(Argentina)	Ignacio Piatti	MF	16			16
2	(Algeria)	Saphir Taïder	MF	7			7
3	(Uruguay)	Alejandro Silva	MF	5	1		6
4	(Chile)	Jeisson Vargas	MF	4			4
5	(Italy)	Matteo Mancosu	FW	3			3
6	(Canada)	Raheem Edwards	MF	2			2
6	(Canada)	Anthony Jackson-Hamel	FW	2			2
8	(United States)	Quincy Amarikwa	FW	1			1
8	(Finland)	Jukka Raitala	DF	1			1
8	(United States)	Daniel Lovitz	DF	1			1
8	(Uganda)	Micheal Azira	MF	1			1
8	(France)	Rod Fanni	DF	1			1
8	(France)	Bacary Sagna	DF	1			1
Totals				45	1	0	46

Updated to match played October 21, 2018
Source: Montreal Impact

Italic: denotes player left the club during the season.

=== Top Assists ===
Rank	Nat.	Player	Pos.	MLS	Canadian Champ	MLS Playoffs	TOTAL
1	(Argentina)	Ignacio Piatti	MF	12			12
2	(Uruguay)	Alejandro Silva	MF	11			11
3	(Algeria)	Saphir Taïder	MF	8	1		9
4	(United States)	Daniel Lovitz	DF	5			5
5	(Canada)	Samuel Piette	MF	3			3
6	(Finland)	Jukka Raitala	DF	2			2
7	(United States)	Chris Duvall	DF	1			1
7	(Italy)	Matteo Mancosu	FW	1			1
7	(Chile)	Jeisson Vargas	MF		1		1
Totals				43	2	0	45

Updated to match played October 21, 2018
Source: Montreal Impact

Italic: denotes player left the club during the season.

=== Multi–goal games ===
No.	Pos.	Player	Date	Opponent	Goals	Source
10	MF	(Argentina) Ignacio Piatti	April 21, 2018	vs Los Angeles FC	3	
11	FW	(Canada) Anthony Jackson-Hamel	May 5, 2018	vs New England Revolution	2	
10	MF	(Argentina) Ignacio Piatti	June 13, 2018	vs Orlando City SC	2	
8	MF	(Algeria) Saphir Taïder	July 7, 2018	vs Colorado Rapids	2	
9	MF	(Uruguay) Alejandro Silva	September 15, 2018	vs Philadelphia Union	2	
10	MF	(Argentina) Ignacio Piatti	October 21, 2018	vs Toronto FC	2	

=== Goals against average ===
No.	Nat.	Player	Total			Major League Soccer			Canadian Championship			MLS Playoffs		
No.	Nat.	Player	MIN	GA	GAA	MIN	GA	GAA	MIN	GA	GAA	MIN	GA	GAA
1	US	Evan Bush	3060	53	1.56	3060	53	1.56	0	0	0.00	0	0	0.00
23	SEN	Clément Diop	180	2	1.00	0	0	0.00	180	2	1.00	0	0	0.00
40	CAN	Jason Beaulieu	0	0	0.00	0	0	0.00	0	0	0.00	0	0	0.00
41	CAN	James Pantemis	0	0	0.00	0	0	0.00	0	0	0.00	0	0	0.00

Updated to match played October 29, 2018
Source: Montreal Impact

Italic: denotes player left the club during the season.

=== Clean sheets ===
No.	Nat.	Player	MLS	Canadian Champ	MLS Cup Playoffs	TOTAL
1	(United States)	Evan Bush	10			10
2	(Senegal)	Clément Diop		1		1
Totals			10	1	0	11

Updated to match played October 21, 2018
Source: Montreal Impact

=== Top minutes played ===
No.	Nat.	Player	Pos.	MLS	Canadian Champ	TOTAL
6	(Canada)	Samuel Piette	MF	3000	180	3180
1	(United States)	Evan Bush	GK	3060		3060
8	(Algeria)	Saphir Taïder	MF	2852	176	3028
10	(Argentina)	Ignacio Piatti	MF	2821	55	2876
3	(United States)	Daniel Lovitz	DF	2650	153	2803
9	(Argentina)	Alejandro Silva	MF	2368	117	2485
22	(Finland)	Jukka Raitala	DF	2290	142	2432
15	(France)	Rod Fanni	DF	2290	90	2380
13	(Japan)	Ken Krolicki	MF	1588	95	1683
4	(France)	Rudy Camacho	DF	1566	90	1656

Updated to match played October 29, 2018
Source: Montreal Impact

Italic: denotes player left the club during the season.

=== Yellow and red cards ===
No.	Player	Total			Major League Soccer			Canadian Championship			MLS Cup Playoffs			Ref.
No.	Player	Yellow card	(yellow card) (red card)	Red card	Yellow card	(yellow card) (red card)	Red card	Yellow card	(yellow card) (red card)	Red card	Yellow card	(yellow card) (red card)	Red card	Ref.
1	Evan Bush	1	0	0	1	0	0	0	0	0	0	0	0	
2	Víctor Cabrera	2	0	1	2	0	1	0	0	0	0	0	0	
3	Daniel Lovitz	3	0	1	3	0	1	0	0	0	0	0	0	
4	Rudy Camacho	2	0	0	2	0	0	0	0	0	0	0	0	
5	Zakaria Diallo	0	0	0	0	0	0	0	0	0	0	0	0	
6	Samuel Piette	6	0	0	5	0	0	1	0	0	0	0	0	
8	Saphir Taïder	3	0	1	3	0	1	0	0	0	0	0	0	
9	Alejandro Silva	5	0	0	4	0	0	1	0	0	0	0	0	
10	Ignacio Piatti	2	0	0	2	0	0	0	0	0	0	0	0	
11	Anthony Jackson-Hamel	0	0	0	0	0	0	0	0	0	0	0	0	
13	Ken Krolicki	5	0	0	5	0	0	0	0	0	0	0	0	
15	Rod Fanni	0	0	0	0	0	0	0	0	0	0	0	0	
16	Jeisson Vargas	1	0	0	1	0	0	0	0	0	0	0	0	
17	David Choinière	0	0	0	0	0	0	0	0	0	0	0	0	
18	Chris Duvall	4	0	0	4	0	0	0	0	0	0	0	0	
19	Michael Salazar	0	0	0	0	0	0	0	0	0	0	0	0	
21	Matteo Mancosu	1	0	0	1	0	0	0	0	0	0	0	0	
22	Jukka Raitala	2	0	0	2	0	0	0	0	0	0	0	0	
23	Clément Diop	0	0	0	0	0	0	0	0	0	0	0	0	
24	Michael Petrasso	2	0	0	2	0	0	0	0	0	0	0	0	
25	Louis Béland-Goyette	0	0	0	0	0	0	0	0	0	0	0	0	
26	Kyle Fisher	0	0	0	0	0	0	0	0	0	0	0	0	
28	Shamit Shome	0	0	0	0	0	0	0	0	0	0	0	0	
29	Mathieu Choinière	0	0	0	0	0	0	0	0	0	0	0	0	
30	Quincy Amarikwa	0	0	0	0	0	0	0	0	0	0	0	0	
32	Micheal Azira	2	0	0	2	0	0	0	0	0	0	0	0	
33	Bacary Sagna	3	0	0	3	0	0	0	0	0	0	0	0	
40	Jason Beaulieu	0	0	0	0	0	0	0	0	0	0	0	0	
41	James Pantemis	0	0	0	0	0	0	0	0	0	0	0	0	
	Dominic Oduro	0	0	0	0	0	0	0	0	0	0	0	0	
	Marco Donadel	2	0	0	2	0	0	0	0	0	0	0	0	
	Raheem Edwards	3	0	0	3	0	0	0	0	0	0	0	0	
	Nick DePuy	0	0	0	0	0	0	0	0	0	0	0	0	
Totals		49	0	3	47	0	3	2	0	0	0	0	0	
Last updated: October 29, 2018

== Recognition ==
=== MLS Best XI ===
Year	Player	Nation	Position	Report
2018	Piatti	Argentina	MF	MLS Best XI

=== MLS Player of the Week ===
Week	Player	Nation	Position	Report
10	Piatti	Argentina	MF	MLS Player of the Week: 10
16	Piatti	Argentina	MF	MLS Player of the Week: 16

=== MLS Goal of the Week ===
Week	Player	Nation	Position	Report
24	Raitala	Finland	DF	MLS Goal of the Week: 24

=== MLS Team of the Week ===
Week	Player	Nation	Position	Report
3	Fanni	France	DF	MLS Team of the Week: 3
3	Piatti	Argentina	MF	MLS Team of the Week: 3
3	Taïder	Algeria	MF	MLS Team of the Week: 3
3	Bush	United States	BN	MLS Team of the Week: 3
8	Piatti	Argentina	MF	MLS Team of the Week: 8
10	Piatti	Argentina	MF	MLS Team of the Week: 10
10	Jackson-Hamel	Canada	FW	MLS Team of the Week: 10
10	Bush	United States	BN	MLS Team of the Week: 10
14	Vargas	Chile	MF	MLS Team of the Week: 14
16	Piatti	Argentina	MF	MLS Team of the Week: 16
16	Bush	United States	GK	MLS Team of the Week: 16
16	Fanni	France	BN	MLS Team of the Week: 16
17	Piette	Canada	MF	MLS Team of the Week: 17
18	Camacho	France	DF	MLS Team of the Week: 18
18	Garde	France	Coach	MLS Team of the Week: 18
19	Taïder	Algeria	MF	MLS Team of the Week: 19
19	Fanni	France	BN	MLS Team of the Week: 19
20	Piatti	Argentina	MF	MLS Team of the Week: 20
21	Fanni	France	DF	MLS Team of the Week: 21
21	Piatti	Argentina	MF	MLS Team of the Week: 21
23	Bush	United States	GK	MLS Team of the Week: 23
24	Bush	United States	BN	MLS Team of the Week: 24
25	Lovitz	United States	DF	MLS Team of the Week: 25
27	Fanni	France	DF	MLS Team of the Week: 27
27	Garde	France	Coach	MLS Team of the Week: 27
27	Piatti	Argentina	BN	MLS Team of the Week: 27
29	Lovitz	United States	DF	MLS Team of the Week: 29
29	Piatti	Argentina	MF	MLS Team of the Week: 29
29	Garde	France	Coach	MLS Team of the Week: 29
29	Silva	Uruguay	BN	MLS Team of the Week: 29
32	Bush	United States	GK	MLS Team of the Week: 32
32	Taïder	Algeria	MF	MLS Team of the Week: 32
32	Garde	France	Coach	MLS Team of the Week: 32
34	Piatti	Argentina	BN	MLS Team of the Week: 34
