= Chris Duvall =

American soccer player (born 1991)

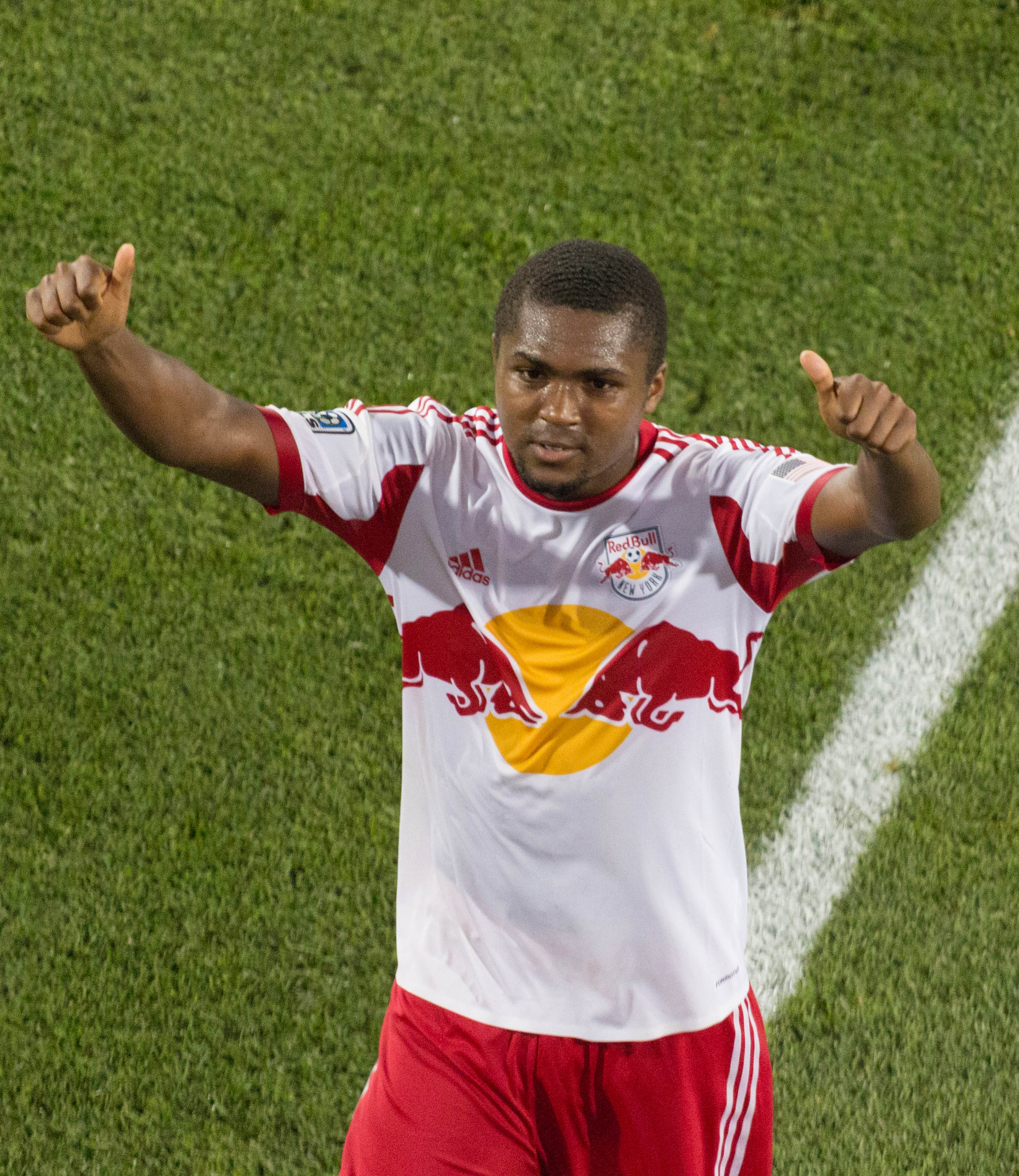
- Duvall with the New York Red Bulls

Personal information
- Full name: Chris Duvall
- Date of birth: September 10, 1991 (age 35)
- Place of birth: Duluth, Georgia, United States
- Height: 5 ft 10 in (1.78 m)
- Position: Right-back

Youth career
- Concorde Fire

College career
Years	Team	Apps	(Gls)
2010–2013	Wake Forest Demon Deacons	74	(1)

Senior career*
Years	Team	Apps	(Gls)
2014–2016	New York Red Bulls	59	(1)
2017–2018	Montreal Impact	42	(1)
2019	Houston Dynamo	1	(0)
2019	→ Rio Grande Valley FC (loan)	3	(0)
2019	OKC Energy	3	(0)
2020	Portland Timbers	10	(0)
2021	FC Cincinnati	4	(0)
Total		122	(2)

Managerial career
- 2022: Charleston Battery (assistant)
- 2023–2026: St. Louis City 2 (assistant)
- 2027–: Forest Park Rangers FC
- * Club domestic league appearances and goals as of November 15, 2021

Chris Duvall (born September 10, 1991) is an American former professional soccer player and soccer coach who serves as head coach and Director of Coaching & Recruitment for Forest Park Rangers FC ahead of the club's planned 2027 inaugural campaign in the Midwest Premier League.

Born in Duluth, Georgia, Duvall began his career with club side Concorde Fire before enrolling at Wake Forest University and playing college soccer for the Wake Forest Demon Deacons. He spent four seasons with Wake Forest before being drafted by the New York Red Bulls in the 2014 MLS SuperDraft. Duvall spent three seasons with the Red Bulls, helping his club win the Supporters' Shield in 2015. He was then traded to the Montreal Impact where he played for two seasons before being traded again to the Houston Dynamo in 2019. After playing four matches for the Dynamo, Duvall was released and signed with USL Championship club OKC Energy before signing with the Portland Timbers for the 2020 season. He retired following the 2021 season with FC Cincinnati.

== Playing career ==
=== Early career ===
Born in Duluth, Georgia, Duvall attended the Wesleyan School for high school, playing on the school soccer and cross country teams. He played club soccer for the Concorde Fire, helping them win three state championships. Duvall played college soccer for Wake Forest University from 2010 to 2013. He was a four-year starter for the Demon Deacons, making 74 appearances, scoring 1 goal, and recording 11 assists in his collegiate career. Duvall helped the Deacs reach the NCAA Tournament in his sophomore, junior, and senior seasons.

=== New York Red Bulls ===
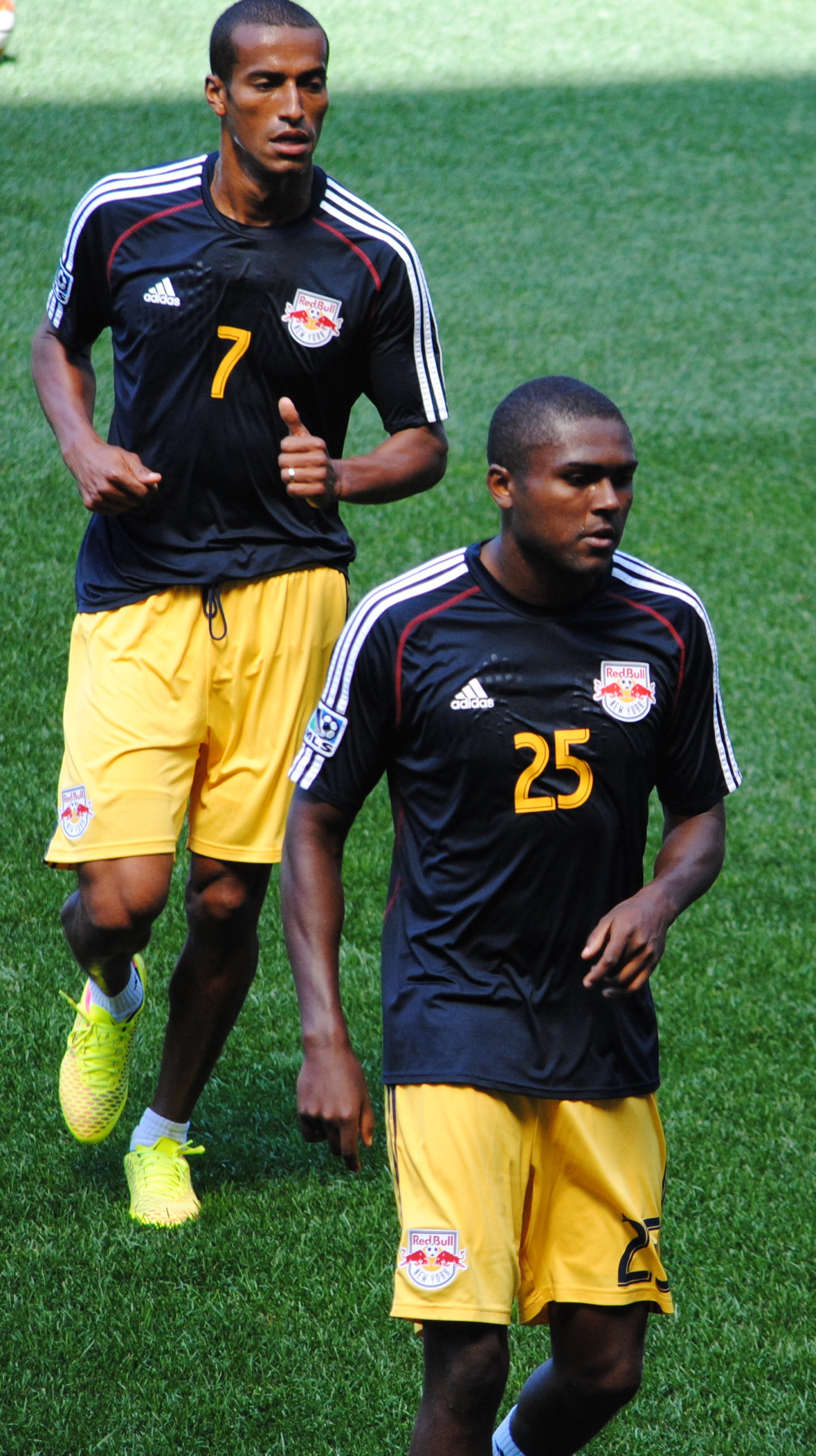
Duvall with teammate Roy Miller

On January 16, 2014, Duvall was selected with the 22nd pick by the New York Red Bulls in the 2014 MLS SuperDraft. He signed with New York on He made his Red Bulls debut on May 17, coming on as a halftime substitute for Kosuke Kimura in a 2–0 loss to Toronto FC. Duvall made his first professional start the next week on May 24 in a 2–1 loss against the Portland Timbers. He ended his rookie season with 19 appearances, 18 of them starts, and 1 assist in the MLS regular season, helping NYRB finish 2nd in the Eastern Conference. Duvall did not appear in the playoffs as the Red Bulls reached the conference finals. He also made 1 Open Cup appearance and 2 CONCACAF Champions League appearances during the season.

On June 28, 2015, Duvall scored his first goal as a professional helping the Red Bulls to a 3–1 Hudson River Derby victory over New York City FC. A few days later, on July 1, 2015, Duvall helped the Red Bulls to a victory in the U.S. Open Cup over another local rival New York Cosmos, drawing a penalty kick during the match which was converted by Sacha Kljestan in a 4–1 victory. However, Duvall suffered a harsh tackle in the waning moments of the match which resulted in a broken right leg, keeping him out of action for the rest of the season. He ended the regular season with 15 appearances, 1 goal, and 1 assist, helping the Red Bulls win the Supporters' Shield.

Due to various injuries to New York's central defenders, Duvall was converted to center-back during the early part of the 2016 season and started the match at center-back in a 7–0 Hudson River Derby victory against New York City FC on May 21. Duvall made 25 appearances and had 2 assists in the regular season as the Red Bulls finished 1st in the East, 3 points behind FC Dallas for the Supporters' Shield. He started both of New York's playoff games as they lost to the Montreal Impact 3–2 over two legs. Duvall also made 2 appearances in the 2016–17 CONCACAF Champions League group stage, helping the Red Bulls top their group.

=== Montreal Impact ===
On December 13, 2016, Duvall was traded along with GAM to the Montreal Impact in exchange for Johan Venegas after being selected second overall by Minnesota United FC in the 2016 MLS Expansion Draft. Duvall made his Impact debut on March 4, 2017, starting in a 1–0 loss to the San Jose Earthquakes. He scored his first goal for the Impact on July 1 in a 2–0 win over D.C. United. Duvall ended the season with 27 appearances, 1 goal, and 2 assists in MLS play as the Impact finished 9th in the Eastern Conference, failing to qualify for the playoffs. He also made 3 appearances in the Canadian Championship as Montreal reached the final, where they lost to their rivals Toronto FC 3–2 on aggregate. On December 29, 2017, Duvall signed a contract extension with Montreal through the 2019 season with an option for 2020.

During the 2018 season, Duvall made 15 appearances and had 1 assist as Montreal finished 7th in the East, one spot out of the playoffs. He saw limited minutes during the second half of the season after suffering a calf injury in July.

=== Houston Dynamo ===
On December 17, 2018, Duvall was traded to the Houston Dynamo in exchange for a third-round pick in the 2020 MLS SuperDraft. He made his Dynamo debut on June 11 in a 3–2 win over the Austin Bold in the U.S. Open Cup. He would appear in his only MLS match with the Dynamo on June 29, a 2–1 defeat to the New England Revolution. Duvall struggled to get playing time and spent time with the Dynamo's USL Championship affiliate Rio Grande Valley FC throughout the season.

On August 6, 2019, Duvall was waived by Houston.

=== Oklahoma City Energy ===
On September 21, 2019, Duvall joined USL Championship side Oklahoma City Energy for the remainder of their season. He made his Energy debut on September 22 in a 0–0 draw with Sacramento Republic.

=== Portland Timbers ===
On February 25, 2020, Duvall signed a contract with Portland Timbers for the 2020 season. He made his Timbers debut on March 8, playing the full 90 minutes in a 1–0 win over Nashville SC. Shortly after the Nashville game, the MLS season was paused due to the COVID-19 Pandemic. Play resumed in July with the MLS is Back tournament, with group stage games counting as regular season matches. Duvall played in all 3 group stage games and played in 3 of Portland's 4 knockout round games to help the Timbers win the tournament. He helped the Timbers finish the shortened regular season 3rd in the Western Conference, appearing in 10 of a possible 23 games. He did not appear in their playoff game. Duvall's contract option was declined by Portland following their 2020 season.

=== FC Cincinnati ===
On August 20, 2021, after participating in training sessions with the club, Duvall signed with Major League Soccer club FC Cincinnati. He made his debut for the club the next day on August 21 against the New England Revolution, coming on as a substitute in a 4–1 defeat. Duvall made 4 appearances during the season as FCC finished last in the Eastern Conference and overall standings. Following the 2021 season, Cincinnati declined their contract option on Duvall.

On January 4, 2022, Duvall announced his retirement.

== Coaching career ==
Duvall joined the Charleston Battery as an assistant coach ahead of the 2022 USL Championship season. On January 23, 2023, it was announced that Duvall had joined Bobby Murphy's St. Louis City 2 staff as an assistant.

In 2026, Duvall was named head coach and Director of Coaching & Recruitment for Forest Park Rangers FC, a St. Louis-based club scheduled to begin play in the Midwest Premier League in 2027.

== Career statistics ==
As of March 11, 2022

Appearances and goals by club, season and competition
Club	Season	League			Playoffs		Cup (Note: Includes U.S. Open Cup and Canadian Championship)		Continental		Other		Total	
Club	Season	Division	Apps	Goals	Apps	Goals	Apps	Goals	Apps	Goals	Apps	Goals	Apps	Goals
New York Red Bulls	2014	Major League Soccer	19	0	0	0	1	0	2 (Note: Appearances in CONCACAF Champions League)	0	—		22	0
New York Red Bulls	2015	Major League Soccer	15	1	0	0	1	0	—		—		16	1
New York Red Bulls	2016	Major League Soccer	25	0	2	0	0	0	2	0	—		29	0
New York Red Bulls	Total		59	1	2	0	2	0	4	0	0	0	67	1
Montreal Impact	2017	Major League Soccer	27	1	—		3	0	—		—		30	1
Montreal Impact	2018	Major League Soccer	15	0	—		0	0	—		—		15	0
Montreal Impact	Total		42	1	0	0	3	0	0	0	0	0	45	1
Houston Dynamo	2019	Major League Soccer	1	0	—		2	0	1 (Note: Appearance in Leagues Cup)	0	—		4	0
Rio Grande Valley FC (loan)	2019	USL Championship	3	0	—		—		—		—		3	0
OKC Energy	2019	USL Championship	3	0	—		0	0	—		—		3	0
Portland Timbers	2020	Major League Soccer	10	0	0	0	—		0	0	3 (Note: Appearances in MLS is Back Tournament knockout stage)	0	13	0
FC Cincinnati	2021	Major League Soccer	4	0	—		—		—		—		4	0
Career total			122	2	2	0	7	0	5	0	3	0	139	2

== Honors ==
New York Red Bulls

- MLS Supporters' Shield : 2015

Portland Timbers

- MLS is Back Tournament: 2020

== Personal life ==
Chris Duvall was born in Duluth, Georgia to Derrell and Darlene Duvall. His brother, Cristan, was on the cross country and track and field teams at Georgia Tech. His godfather is former Pro-Bowl receiver Billy "White Shoes" Johnson.
