= Evan Bush =

American soccer player (born 1986)

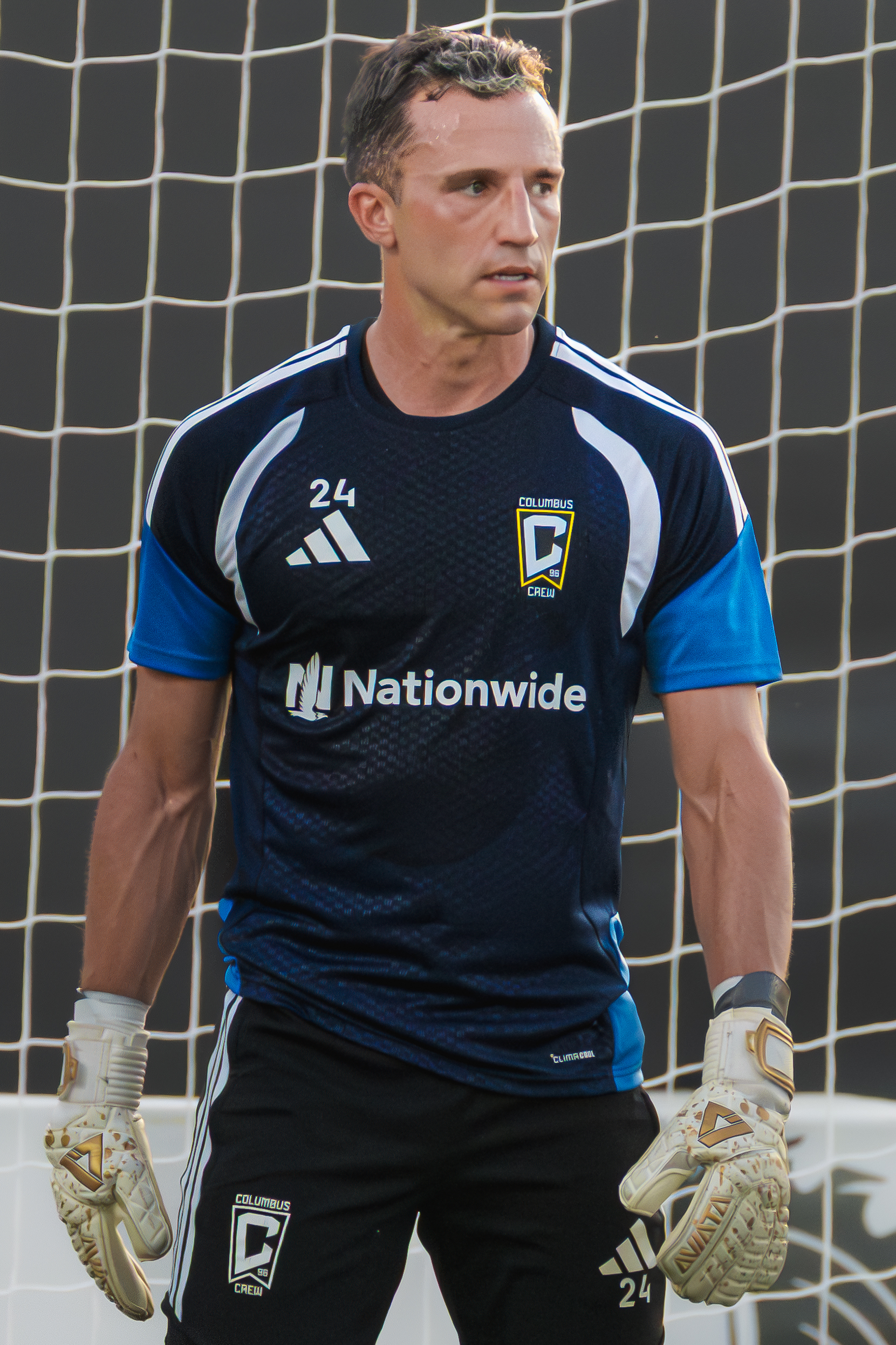
- Bush with the Columbus Crew in 2026

Personal information
- Full name: Evan William Bush
- Date of birth: March 6, 1986 (age 40)
- Place of birth: Concord Township, Ohio, United States
- Height: 6 ft 1 in (1.85 m)
- Position: Goalkeeper

Team information
- Current team: Columbus Crew
- Number: 24

Youth career
- Mentor Impact
- Cleveland Force

College career
Years	Team	Apps	(Gls)
2005–2008	Akron Zips		

Senior career*
Years	Team	Apps	(Gls)
2006	Chicago Fire Premier	10	(0)
2007	Cleveland Internationals	3	(0)
2008	Cape Cod Crusaders	16	(0)
2009	Cleveland City Stars	7	(0)
2010	Crystal Palace Baltimore	25	(0)
2011	Montreal Impact	18	(0)
2012–2020	Montreal Impact	176	(0)
2020	Vancouver Whitecaps FC	8	(0)
2021–	Columbus Crew	12	(0)
- * Club domestic league appearances and goals as of October 25, 2025

Evan William Bush (born March 6, 1986) is an American professional soccer player who plays as a goalkeeper for Major League Soccer club Columbus Crew.

== Career ==
=== College and amateur ===
Bush attended Lake Catholic High School in Mentor, Ohio, playing soccer, basketball, and football. He played college soccer at Akron, where he was named to the NSCAA all-Great Lakes Region and the 2008 all-Ohio team season. He was also a three-time all-Mid American Conference first team selection, the 2005 MAC Newcomer of the Year, was named to the 2005 Freshman All-American team, and finished his collegiate career as the all-time leader in the MAC in wins (62), shutouts (48), and G.A.A (.60).

During his college years Bush also played with Chicago Fire Premier, the Cleveland Internationals, and the Cape Cod Crusaders in the USL Premier Development League, being named to the PDL All-Central Conference team in 2006.

=== Professional ===
==== Lower divisions ====
Bush turned professional in 2009, and after failing to secure a professional contract with Seattle Sounders FC of Major League Soccer, signed to play with the Cleveland City Stars of the USL First Division. He made his professional debut on May 30, 2009, in a game against the Charleston Battery.

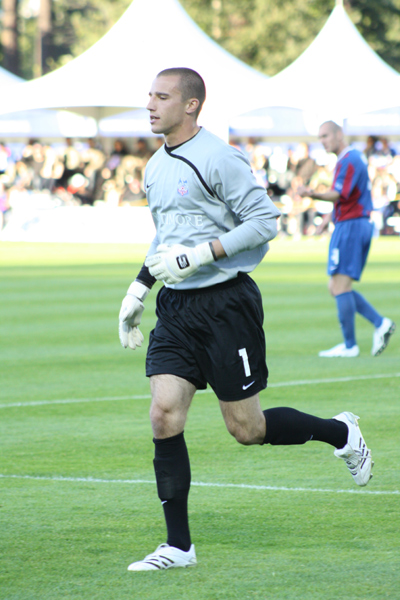
Bush with Crystal Palace Baltimore in 2010.

On February 18, 2010, Crystal Palace Baltimore announced the signing of Bush to a contract for the 2010 season. After spending the 2010 season with Crystal Palace Baltimore, Bush signed with the Montreal Impact of the North American Soccer League on March 11, 2011. Bush began the 2011 season as the backup goalkeeper to Bill Gaudette. After Gaudette sustained an injury, Bush was given the opportunity to play consistently. Throughout the remainder of the season, Bush earned two Defensive Player of the Week honors and one Player of the Month award. Bush was awarded the 2011 Golden Glove, which is given to the goalkeeper with the best goals-against average in the NASL, and finished the year with nine shutouts, including seven in the final 10 games of the season.

==== Major League Soccer ====
Bush signed a contract with the Montreal Impact to remain with the club for their inaugural season in Major League Soccer on October 21, 2011. The following two seasons, he appeared in two league games, appearing mainly in the Canadian Championship and CONCACAF Champions League games. On August 7, 2013 in a CONCACAF Champions League game, he saved a penalty attempt by Alan Gordon to keep a shutout and help earn a 1–0 win against the San Jose Earthquakes. On November 21, 2014, Bush was signed to a new contract by the Impact.

The 2015 season was a breakthrough for Bush, as he became Montreal's number one goalkeeper, helping guide the club to the final of the Champions League. In the first leg of the Champions League final at Club América, Bush was given a controversial yellow card after allowing a goal for kicking the ball at Paul Aguilar, an América player. However, replays show that Aguilar jumped in front of the ball as Bush was kicking it away. Aguilar then punched Bush in the face, which went unnoticed by the referee. This yellow card suspended him for the second leg in Montreal. Bush showed his frustration for the call after the match, saying "After every goal I give up, I kick the ball towards midfield. Every single goal. The fact is that I had the ball in my hands, I kicked it towards midfield and he comes and blocks the ball. Then he hits me in the face." As a result, Bush missed the second leg of the final, which Montreal lost 4–2 and 5–3 on aggregate. Bush won the Golden Glove Award as the best goalkeeper of the 2014–15 CONCACAF Champions League.

On September 28, 2020, after appearing in zero games for Montreal, the club traded Bush to Canadian rival Vancouver Whitecaps FC, in exchange for Vancouver's third-round pick in the 2021 MLS SuperDraft.

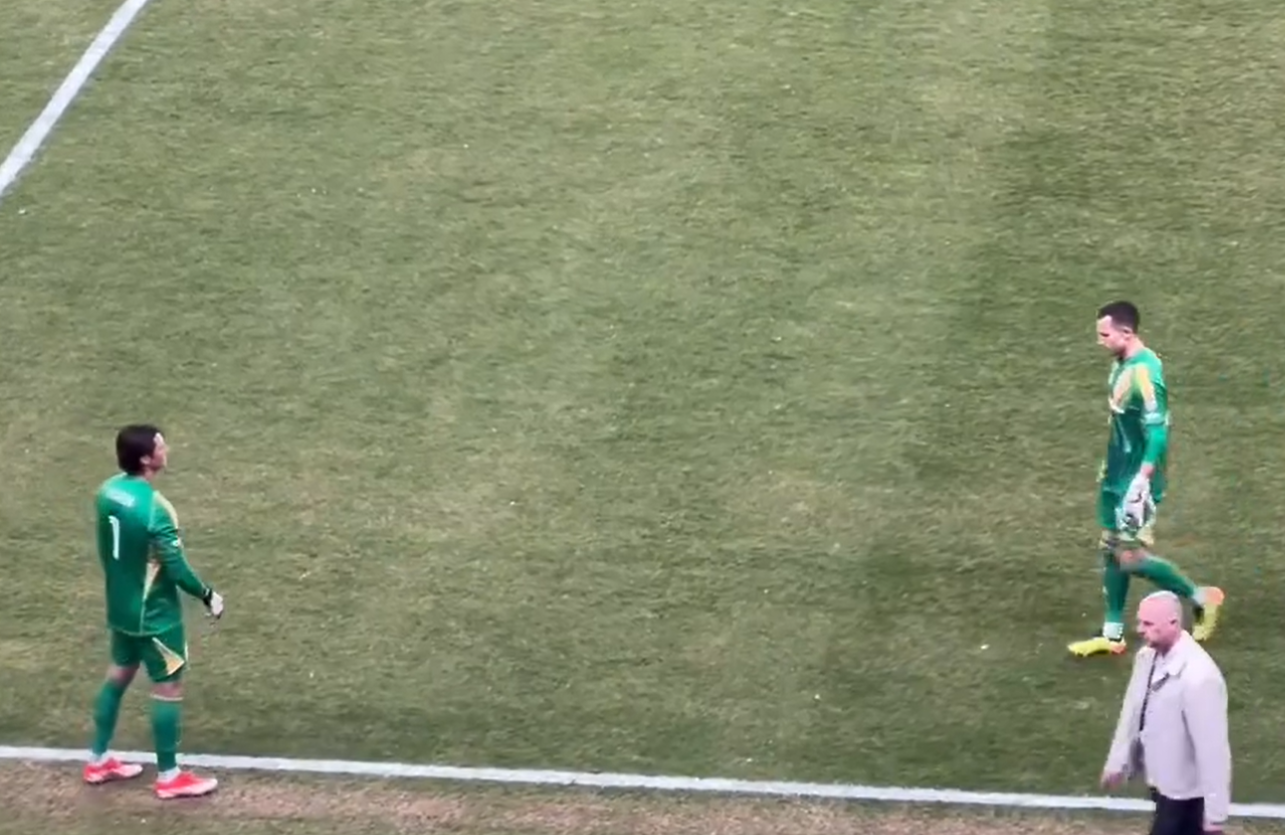
Bush (right) being substituted off after breaking his arm in 2024.

Bush was traded to the Columbus Crew on December 14, 2020, in exchange for $125,000 of General Allocation Money. During the 2021 season, Bush made five total appearances for the Black and Gold, including the 2–0 shutout of Cruz Azul in the Campeones Cup. On January 10, 2022, Bush re-signed with the Crew for the 2022 season, with an option for the 2023 season. At the end of the 2023 season, Bush re-signed with Columbus on a one year deal. During the 2024 season, Bush broke his arm in a collision in a match against Real Salt Lake, and suffered a further setback when he broke the same arm while training in preparation for his return. At the conclusion of the season, Bush signed a one-year deal for the 2025 season. During the 2025 season, he appeared in a total of seven games for the club, earning a shutout on his first game back following his arm break, a 0–0 draw versus New York City FC. on December 11, 2025, he re-signed with Columbus until the end of 2026.

== Honors ==
Montreal Impact

- Canadian Championship: 2013, 2014, 2019

Columbus Crew

- MLS Cup: 2023
- Campeones Cup: 2021
- Leagues Cup: 2024

Individual

- CONCACAF Champions League Golden Glove: 2014–15

== Career statistics ==
As of July 9, 2026

Appearances and goals by club, season and competition
Club	Season	League			National cup		Continental		Other		Total	
Club	Season	Division	Apps	Goals	Apps	Goals	Apps	Goals	Apps	Goals	Apps	Goals
Cleveland City Stars	2009	USL First Division	7	0	0	0	—		0	0	7	0
Crystal Palace Baltimore	2010	USSF Division 2 Professional League	25	0	1	0	—		—		26	0
Montreal Impact	2011	North American Soccer League	19	9	—		—		—		19	0
Montreal Impact	2012	Major League Soccer	1	0	—		—		—		1	0
Montreal Impact	2013	Major League Soccer	1	0	4	0	4 (Note: Appearance(s) in CONCACAF Champions League)	0	—		9	0
Montreal Impact	2014	Major League Soccer	13	0	4	0	4	0	—		21	0
Montreal Impact	2015	Major League Soccer	31	0	0	0	5	0	3 (Note: Appearance(s) in MLS Cup Playoffs)	0	39	0
Montreal Impact	2016	Major League Soccer	33	0	0	0	—		5	0	38	0
Montreal Impact	2017	Major League Soccer	31	0	0	0	—		—		31	0
Montreal Impact	2018	Major League Soccer	34	0	—		—		—		34	0
Montreal Impact	2019	Major League Soccer	32	0	0	0	—		—		32	0
Montreal Impact	Total		176	0	8	0	13	0	8	0	205	0
Vancouver Whitecaps FC	2020	Major League Soccer	8	0	—		0	0	—		8	0
Columbus Crew	2021	Major League Soccer	4	0	—		—		1 (Note: Appearance in the Campeones Cup)	0	5	0
Columbus Crew	2022	Major League Soccer	0	0	1	0	—		—		1	0
Columbus Crew	2023	Major League Soccer	0	0	3	0	—		2 (Note: Appearance(s) in Leagues Cup)	0	5	0
Columbus Crew	2024	Major League Soccer	2	0	—		0	0	0	0	2	0
Columbus Crew	2025	Major League Soccer	6	0	—		0	0	1 (Note: Appearance(s) in Leagues Cup)	0	7	0
Columbus Crew	Total		12	0	4	0	0	0	4	0	20	0
Career Total			243	0	12	0	13	0	11	0	285	0
