= Ken Krolicki =

Japanese footballer (born 1996)

Personal information
- Date of birth: March 15, 1996 (age 30)
- Place of birth: Tokyo, Japan
- Height: 5 ft 10 in (1.78 m)
- Position: Midfielder

Youth career
- 2011: Canton High School
- 2012: Michigan Jaguars
- 2013–2014: Crew Academy Wolves

College career
Years	Team	Apps	(Gls)
2014–2017	Michigan State Spartans	81	(7)

Senior career*
Years	Team	Apps	(Gls)
2015–2017	K-W United	25	(7)
2018–2019	Montreal Impact	34	(0)
2020	Portland Timbers 2	8	(0)
2022–2023	Bentleigh Greens	17	(0)
- * Club domestic league appearances and goals as of July 8, 2022

Ken Krolicki (born March 15, 1996) is a Japanese footballer who last played for NPL Victoria side Bentleigh Greens.

== Personal life ==
Krolicki was born in Tokyo, Japan, to a Polish-American father and a Japanese mother and holds both Japanese and American passports. Krolicki moved to Fukuoka Prefecture as a young child, and grew up in Kitakyushu, Japan and moved to Michigan as a freshman in high school. He majored in applied engineering sciences at Michigan State.

== Career ==
=== College and amateur ===
Krolicki played his college career at Michigan State University where he played mainly as a midfielder. Krolicki played 81 matches for the Spartans, starting 67. He scored 7 goals and had 14 assists. At Michigan State, Krolicki was named first-team All-Big Ten and first-team All-Midwest Region and was an All-Academic Big Ten selection.

Krolicki also played for Premier Development League side K-W United. He was a member of the 2015 K-W United team that won the PDL championship against the New York Red Bulls U-23 side.

Before college, Krolicki played for the U-16 and U-18 Crew Academy Wolves in 2013 and 2014 in Michigan. He was also a member of the 2011 Canton High School team that won the Michigan state championship and the 2012 Michigan Jaguars club team that won the US Youth Soccer U-16 National Championship.

=== Professional ===
On January 21, 2018, Montreal Impact selected Krolicki with the 53rd overall pick of the 2018 MLS SuperDraft. He signed with the club on February 28, 2018.

Krolicki made his professional debut on March 4, 2018, when he started in a 2–1 loss against Vancouver Whitecaps FC.

On November 21, 2019, Krolicki's contract option was declined by Montreal.

Krolicki made the move to USL Championship side Portland Timbers 2 on January 15, 2020. Timbers 2 opted to stop operating following the 2020 season.

== Honours ==
=== Club ===
Montreal Impact

- Canadian Championship: 2019

== Career statistics ==
As of matches played on August 28, 2019.

Club	season	MLS		Playoffs		Cup (Note: Appearances in the Canadian Championship.)		Total	
Club	season	Apps	Goals	Apps	Goals	Apps	Goals	Apps	Goals
Montreal Impact	2018	24	0	0	0	2	0	26	0
Montreal Impact	2019	10	0	0	0	4	0	14	0
Career totals		38	0	0	0	2	0	40	0
