= Anthony Jackson-Hamel =

Canadian soccer player (born 1993)

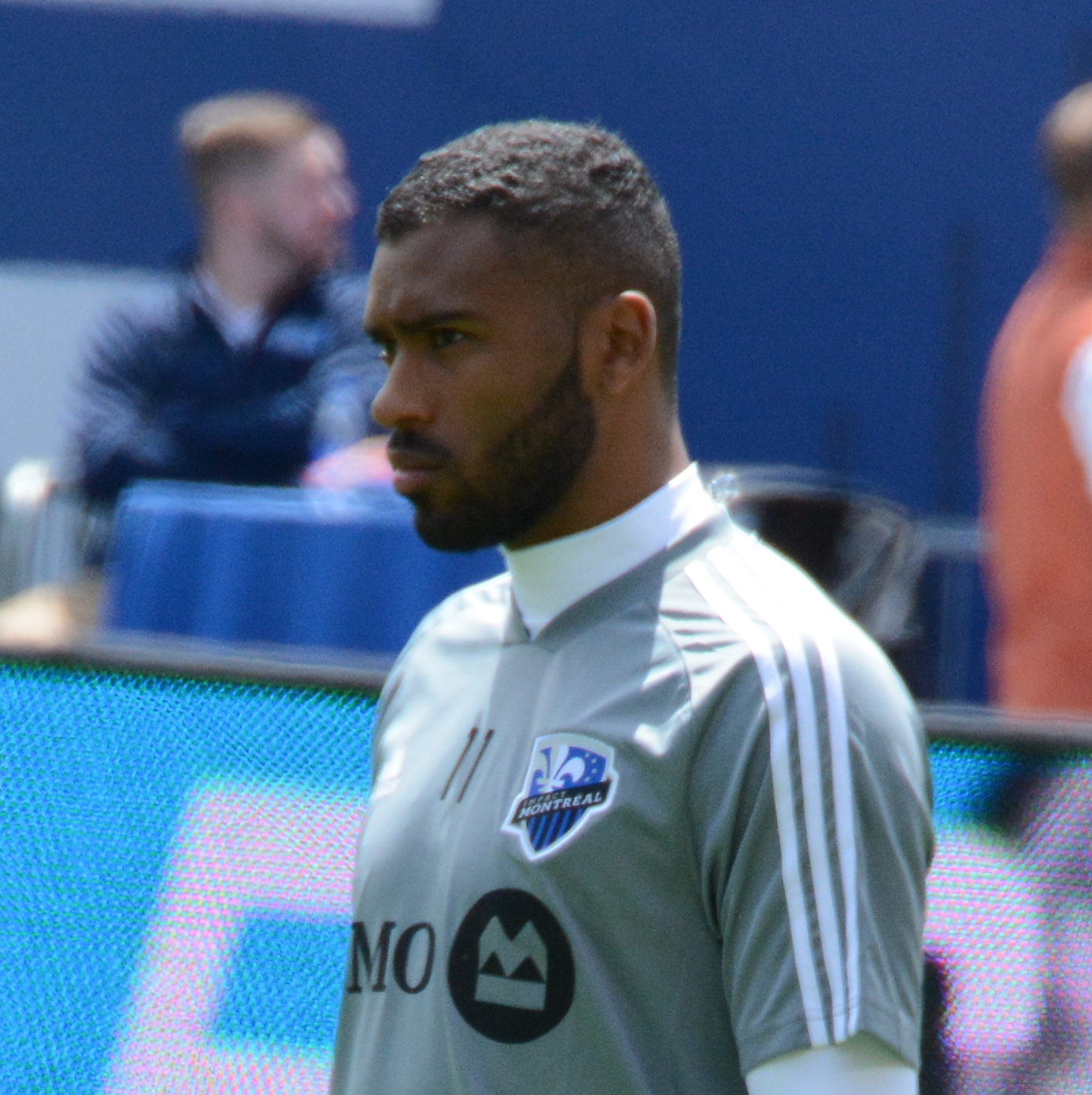
- Jackson-Hamel with Montreal Impact in 2019

Personal information
- Full name: Anthony Jackson-Hamel
- Date of birth: August 3, 1993 (age 33)
- Place of birth: Quebec City, Quebec, Canada
- Height: 1.85 m (6 ft 1 in)
- Position: Striker

Youth career
- Impact Junior ARS Quebec
- 2010–2014: Montreal Impact

Senior career*
| Years | Team | Apps | (Gls) |
| 2014 | Montreal Impact U23 | 6 | (4) |
| 2015–2016 | FC Montreal | 20 | (11) |
| 2014–2020 | Montreal Impact | 79 | (15) |

International career^{‡}
| 2013 | Canada U20 | 1 | (0) |
| 2015 | Canada U23 | 5 | (0) |
| 2016–2017 | Canada | 9 | (3) |
- * Club domestic league appearances and goals as of November 8, 2020 ‡ National team caps and goals as of October 8, 2018

Anthony Jackson-Hamel (born August 3, 1993) is a former Canadian soccer player who played as a forward.

== Club career ==
=== Early career ===
Jackson-Hamel joined the Montreal Impact Academy in the Canadian Soccer League's first division in 2010. He re-joined the academy the following season. In his second season in the inter-provincial league, he assisted the club in securing a playoff berth. Montreal would be eliminated from the playoff tournament in the first round by Capital City.

His final stint in the league with the academy occurred in the 2012 season. Throughout the season, he helped Montreal secure another playoff berth by finishing second in the division. Their opponents in the preliminary round of the postseason were Toronto FC's academy where Montreal successfully advanced to the next round. In the second round, he contributed a goal against the York Region Shooters which secured their berth in the championship final. In the playoff finals, Montreal was defeated by Toronto Croatia.

In 2014 he played with the USL PDL club Montreal Impact U23, where he netted 4 goals in 6 appearances.

=== Montreal Impact ===
He signed his first professional contract with the Montreal Impact on August 1, 2014. He made his debut as a 65th-minute substitute during a 0–2 loss to Toronto FC on August 2, 2014. He started his first MLS game on the 13th of September 2014 against New England Revolution. Jackson-Hamel was selected to participate in the 2015 Chipotle Homegrown Game against Club América U-20 as part of the 2015 MLS All-Star Game festivities. He scored his first goal for the Impact against the New York Red Bulls in a 3–0 victory on March 13, 2016.

In April 2017, there was speculation that Jackson-Hamel would be released by the Impact but managed to secure a two-year deal. Amongst this speculation, Jackson-Hamel scored 3 goals in 37 minutes to start the 2017 season, including a backheel in stoppage time to defeat Atlanta United, and 2 goals against Philadelphia Union. After a difficult 2018 season, where Jackson-Hamel only managed two goals and was dropped mid-season by Montreal coach Rémi Garde, the coach confirmed the club was actively shopping the striker. He would help Montreal secure the 2019 Canadian Championship. Throughout the 2020 season, he participated in the 2020 CONCACAF Champions League by appearing in 4 matches. At the end of the 2020 season, Jackson-Hamel would be released by the Impact, ending his time at the club after seven seasons.

=== FC Montreal ===
Jackson-Hamel would also see action in the USL Championship in 2015 with Montreal's reserve team. He would make his debut for the club on April 25, 2015, against the Richmond Kickers. On July 12, 2015, he recorded his first two goals for Montreal against the Pittsburgh Riverhounds.

After experiencing limited playing time with the senior team, he returned to the reserve squad the following season. In his second season with the club, he recorded 9 goals in 16 appearances and he finished as the club's top goal scorer.

== International career ==
Jackson-Hamel was born in Canada to a Dominican father and a Quebecois mother. He has represented Canada at the youth level and was a part of the team that played at the 2013 CONCACAF U-20 Championship.

He received his first call-up to the Canada national team in October 2016 for a pair of friendlies in Morocco. He subsequently made his debut for Canada on October 6, 2016, against Mauritania, coming on as a substitute in the 69th minute. Jackson-Hamel scored his first goal for Canada against Bermuda on January 22, 2017. He was selected to represent the senior national team in the 2017 CONCACAF Gold Cup.

=== International goals ===
As of match played September 2, 2017.
Scores and results list Canada's goal tally first.

| Goal | Date | Venue | Opponent | Score | Result | Competition |
|---|---|---|---|---|---|---|
| 1 | January 22, 2017 | Bermuda National Stadium, Hamilton, Bermuda | Bermuda | 4–2 | 4–2 | Friendly |
| 2 | June 13, 2017 | Saputo Stadium, Montreal, Canada | Curaçao | 2–1 | 2–1 | Friendly |
| 3 | September 2, 2017 | BMO Field, Toronto, Canada | Jamaica | 1–0 | 2–0 | Friendly |

== Honours ==
=== Club ===
Montreal Impact

- Canadian Championship: 2019

Montreal Impact Academy

- CSL Championship Runners-up: 2012

== Career statistics ==
=== Club ===
As of match played December 15, 2020

| Club | League | Season | League | | Playoffs | | Domestic Cup | | Continental | | Other | | Total | |
| Club | League | Season | Apps | Goals | Apps | Goals | Apps | Goals | Apps | Goals | Apps | Goals | Apps | Goals |
|---|---|---|---|---|---|---|---|---|---|---|---|---|---|---|
| FC Montreal (loan) | USL | 2015 | 4 | 2 | 0 | 0 | 0 | 0 | 0 | 0 | 0 | 0 | 4 | 2 |
| FC Montreal (loan) | USL | 2016 | 16 | 9 | 0 | 0 | 0 | 0 | 0 | 0 | 0 | 0 | 16 | 9 |
| FC Montreal (loan) | Total | | 20 | 11 | 0 | 0 | 0 | 0 | 0 | 0 | 0 | 0 | 20 | 11 |
| Montreal Impact | MLS | 2014 | 4 | 0 | 0 | 0 | 0 | 0 | 0 | 0 | 0 | 0 | 4 | 0 |
| Montreal Impact | MLS | 2015 | 8 | 0 | 0 | 0 | 2 | 1 | 1 | 0 | 0 | 0 | 11 | 1 |
| Montreal Impact | MLS | 2016 | 7 | 1 | 0 | 0 | 0 | 0 | 0 | 0 | 0 | 0 | 7 | 1 |
| Montreal Impact | MLS | 2017 | 21 | 9 | 0 | 0 | 2 | 1 | 0 | 0 | 0 | 0 | 23 | 10 |
| Montreal Impact | MLS | 2018 | 16 | 2 | 0 | 0 | 1 | 0 | 0 | 0 | 0 | 0 | 17 | 2 |
| Montreal Impact | MLS | 2019 | 16 | 3 | 0 | 0 | 1 | 1 | 0 | 0 | 0 | 0 | 17 | 4 |
| Montreal Impact | MLS | 2020 | 7 | 0 | 1 | 0 | 0 | 0 | 3 | 0 | 1 (Note: Knockout Round of the MLS is Back Tournament.) | 0 | 12 | 0 |
| Montreal Impact | Total | | 79 | 15 | 1 | 0 | 6 | 3 | 4 | 0 | 1 | 0 | 91 | 18 |
| Career total | | | 99 | 26 | 1 | 0 | 6 | 3 | 4 | 0 | 1 | 0 | 111 | 29 |
