= Kyle Fisher =

American soccer player (born 1994)

Personal information
- Date of birth: June 19, 1994 (age 32)
- Place of birth: Easley, South Carolina, U.S.
- Height: 6 ft 0 in (1.83 m)
- Position: Defender

Youth career
- 2006–2011: Carolina Elite Soccer Academy

College career
Years	Team	Apps	(Gls)
2012–2015	Clemson Tigers	83	(6)

Senior career*
Years	Team	Apps	(Gls)
2013	Orlando City U-23	10	(1)
2014	Portland Timbers U23s	11	(1)
2016–2018	Montreal Impact	22	(1)
2016	→ FC Montreal (loan)	14	(0)
2019	Birmingham Legion	23	(0)
- * Club domestic league appearances and goals as of October 21, 2019

Kyle Fisher (born June 19, 1994) is an American former professional soccer player who played as a defender.

== Career ==
=== College ===
Fisher played four years of college soccer at Clemson University between 2012 and 2015, where he was named ACC Defensive Player of the Year in 2015 and First Team All-American. He captained the Tigers to the 2015 National Championship.

While at Clemson he started in 83 games during his collegiate career, ranking 3rd overall for games started in Clemson Men's Soccer history and 9th most games played in Clemson Men's Soccer history with 83 games.

His Freshman year he was named to the Indiana Invitational All-Tournament team. He was selected to the All-ACC team three consecutive seasons. Fisher was also selected to the All-South Region teams three consecutive seasons; which only five other players in program history have ever done.

During his Senior season he was selected to the All-ACC First team, All-South Regional First team, NSCAA First Team All-American, College Cup All Tournament team, and Top Drawer Soccer Postseason Best XI team. Fisher was named Defensive Player of the Year in the ACC in 2015, his senior season. Only two other Clemson players have won this honor.

On February 18, 2016, South Carolina Senator Alexander passed a Bill to recognize Kyle Fisher for his on field achievements his Senior season. The South Carolina House of Representatives later passed Bill 4953 on February 23, 2016, to recognize and celebrate Kyle Fisher for his remarkable season.

While at college, Fisher also played with Premier Development League sides Orlando City U-23 and Portland Timbers U23s.

=== Professional ===
Fisher was selected in the first round (14th overall) of the 2016 MLS SuperDraft by Montreal Impact. He made his professional debut with the Impact's United Soccer League team, FC Montreal, on March 25, 2016, starting in a 0–1 loss to Bethlehem Steel FC. He made his first MLS start against the LA Galaxy in a 3–2 win on May 28, 2016.

Fisher was released by Montreal at the end of their 2018 season after missing the entire season with a broken tibia.

Fisher signed with USL Championship side Birmingham Legion FC and played in 23 games for the 2019 season before retiring due to injuries.

Personal

Kyle Fisher works in CBRE's Jacksonville office specializing in the industrial market. His focus is on advising industrial clients with both acquisitions and disposition of industrial space through sales and leasing, along with assisting in industrial investments throughout the North Florida markets.
