= Ambroise Oyongo =

Cameroonian footballer (born 1991)

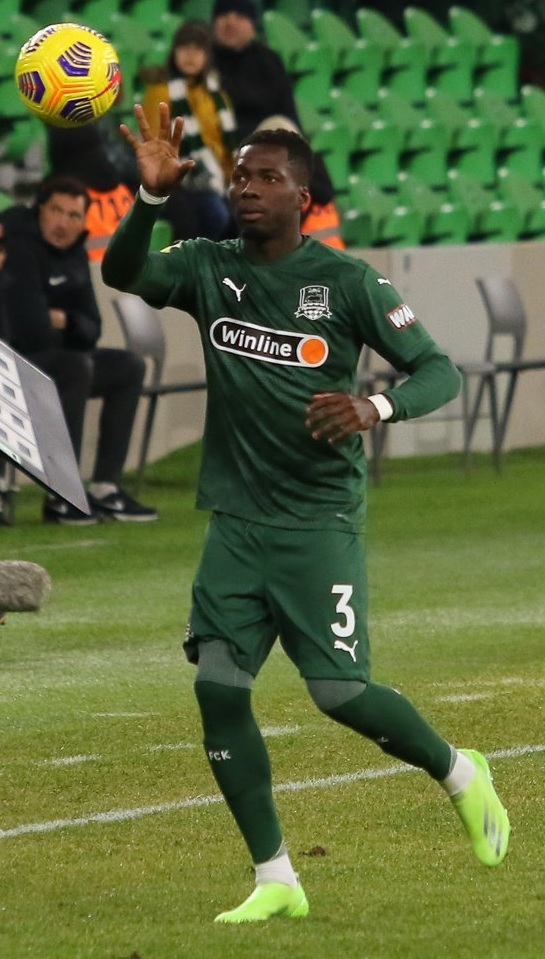
- Oyongo with FC Krasnodar in 2021

Personal information
- Full name: Ambroise Oyongo Bitolo
- Date of birth: 22 June 1991 (age 35)
- Place of birth: Ndikiniméki, Cameroon
- Height: 1.76 m (5 ft 9 in)
- Position: Left-back

Youth career
- 2008–2010: Moussango Yaoundé

Senior career*
Years	Team	Apps	(Gls)
2009–2010	Moussango Yaoundé		
2010–2013	Coton Sport	123	(8)
2014	Rainbow FC		
2014	New York Red Bulls	13	(0)
2014	New York Red Bulls II	5	(0)
2015–2017	Montreal Impact	60	(2)
2018–2022	Montpellier	74	(4)
2021	→ Krasnodar (loan)	1	(0)
2021	Montpellier B	1	(0)
2024–2026	Paris 13 Atletico	47	(1)

International career
2010–2011	Cameroon U20	8	(0)
2012–2022	Cameroon	51	(2)
Medal record
Men's football
Representing Cameroon
Africa Cup of Nations
Winner	2017 Gabon
Third place	2021 Cameroon
- * Club domestic league appearances and goals as of 23 June 2026

Ambroise Oyongo Bitolo (born 22 June 1991) is a Cameroonian professional footballer who plays as a left-back.

== Club career ==
=== Coton Sport ===
Ambroise Oyongo began his career with Moussango FC of Yaoundé in 2008. His play with Moussango attracted the interest of top club Coton Sport FC who signed him in July 2010. He quickly established himself at the club winning the league title in his first year with Coton Sport. In 2011, he helped the club to the league and cup double. In 2013, he won another league title and helped lead Coton Sport to the semi-finals of the 2013 CAF Champions League.

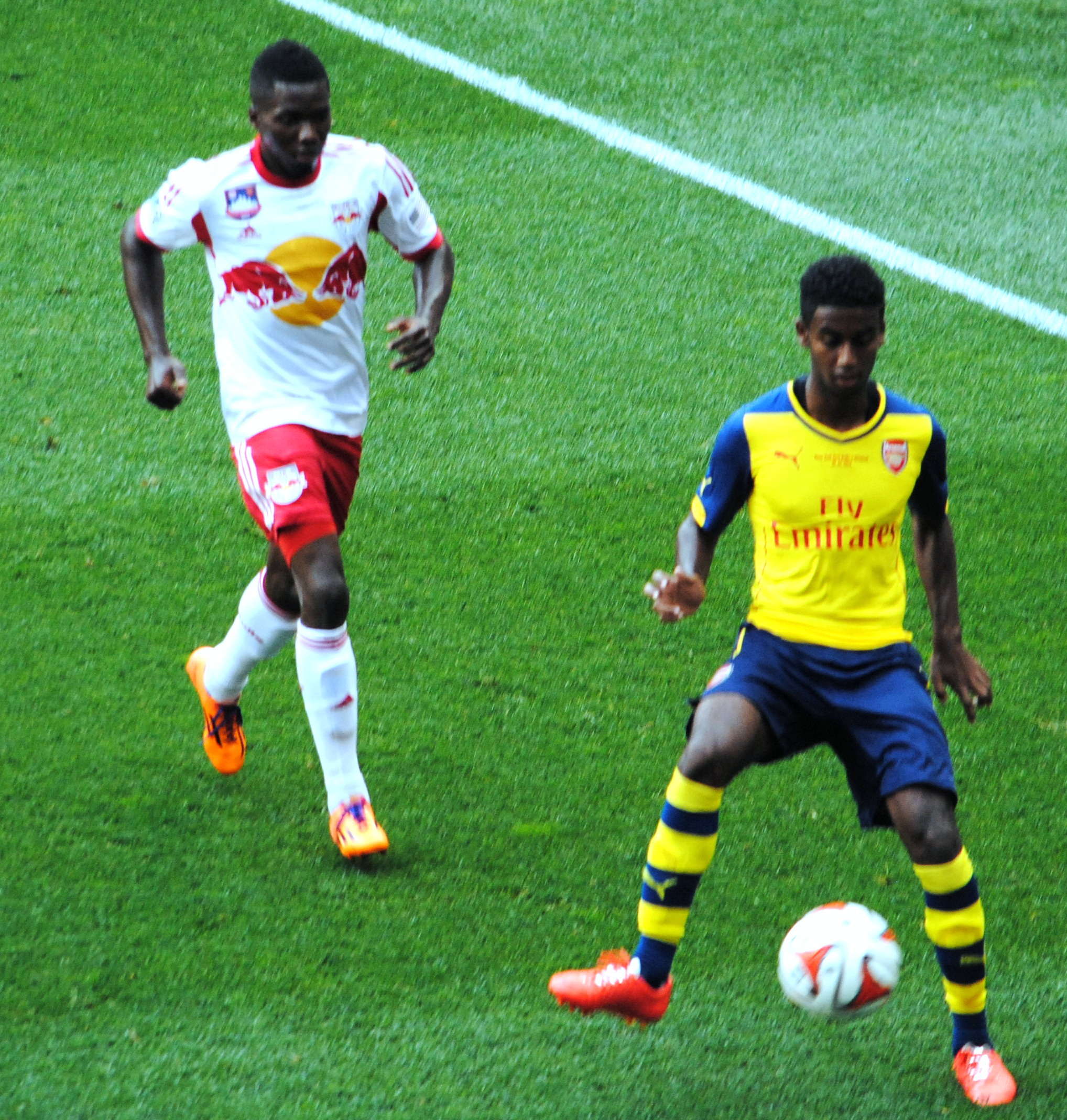
Oyongo in action against Arsenal

=== New York Red Bulls ===
During the 2013 season, Oyongo went on trial with French side Lille and it was reported that he would be joining the Ligue 1 side during the 2014 January transfer window. The move never materialised and in January 2014 Oyongo went on trial with New York Red Bulls. He impressed during his trial and on 7 March 2014, he officially signed with the club. In his first season with New York, the versatile Oyongo was a key player for the club during the second half of the season as he made starts at both left-back and in midfield helping his side qualify for the league playoffs. On 30 October 2014, Oyongo assisted on Bradley Wright-Phillips winning goal in the last minute of the match helping New York defeat Sporting Kansas City and advance to the Eastern Conference Semifinals.

=== Montreal Impact ===
On 27 January 2015, Oyongo was traded to Montreal Impact with Eric Alexander, an international player roster spot and allocation money for Felipe and the 1st pick in the MLS allocation ranking.

=== Montpellier ===
Oyongo's contract expired at the end of the 2017 season, and he opted to move to Europe rather than renewing his deal with Montreal. He signed with French club Montpellier in December 2017.

On 22 February 2021, he moved on loan to Krasnodar in Russian Premier League until the end of the 2020–21 season. He made his debut for Krasnodar on 28 February 2021 in a Russian Premier League game against Ural Yekaterinburg, when he substituted injured Yevgeni Chernov in the 33rd minute. However, at half-time, Oyongo had to be substituted due to injury himself. On 4 March 2021, his agent announced that he will have to be operated on in Spain and will not be able to play for Krasnodar for the duration of the loan and will not return to the club. Krasnodar paid all of the salary due in advance at that time.

=== Paris 13 Atletico ===
On 31 July 2024, Oyongo signed for Championnat National club Paris 13 Atletico.

== International career ==
Oyongo played for Cameroon at the 2011 FIFA U-20 World Cup. On 28 July 2013 he made his debut with the Cameroon senior team, starting in a 1–0 victory over Gabon at Stade Ahmadou Ahidjo.

At the 2015 Africa Cup of Nations, Oyongo scored his first international goal in a 1–1 draw against Mali on 20 January 2015.

In January 2017, Oyongo participated in the 2017 Africa Cup of Nations. He started every match of the tournament, including all three group-stage fixtures, establishing himself as Cameroon's first-choice left-back. In particular, he scored in the penalty shoot-out during the quarter-final against the Senegal, helping Cameroon advance to the semi-finals. Cameroon defeated the Ghana 2–0 to reach the final, where they beat the Egypt 2–1 on 5 February 2017 to win the title. Oyongo played the full 90 minutes in the final, contributing to Cameroon's victory.

He was named in Cameroon's squad for the 2017 FIFA Confederations Cup, but was subsequently ruled out of the tournament after suffering a ruptured patellar tendon during a 1–0 victory against the Morocco on 10 June.

In June 2019, Oyongo was included in Cameroon's squad for the 2019 Africa Cup of Nations. He appeared in all three group-stage matches as Cameroon advanced to the round of 16. However, they were eliminated after losing 3–2 to the Nigeria.

Oyongo also participated in the 2021 Africa Cup of Nations, which was held in Cameroon in 2022. He appeared in the third-place play-off against the Burkina Faso. Cameroon drew 3–3 in regulation time before winning the penalty shoot-out, with Oyongo scoring the decisive final penalty to help secure third place for his team.

== Career statistics ==
=== International ===
As of match played 29 March 2022

Appearances and goals by national team and year
National team	Year	Apps	Goals
Cameroon	2012	1	0
Cameroon	2013	1	0
Cameroon	2014	5	0
Cameroon	2015	9	1
Cameroon	2016	6	0
Cameroon	2017	10	1
Cameroon	2018	4	0
Cameroon	2019	10	0
Cameroon	2020	2	0
Cameroon	2021	0	0
Cameroon	2022	3	0
Total		51	2

Scores and results list Cameroon's goal tally first, score column indicates score after each Oyongo goal.

List of international goals scored by Ambroise Oyongo
No.	Date	Venue	Opponent	Score	Result	Competition
1	20 January 2015	Malabo, Equatorial Guinea	Mali	1–1	1–1	2015 Africa Cup of Nations

== Honours ==
Coton Sport

- Elite One: 2010, 2011, 2013
- Cameroon Cup: 2011

Cameroon

- Africa Cup of Nations: 2017
- Africa Cup of Nations bronze: 2021
