= Louis Béland-Goyette =

Canadian soccer player

Personal information
- Full name: Louis Béland-Goyette
- Date of birth: September 15, 1995 (age 31)
- Place of birth: Pointe-Claire, Quebec, Canada
- Height: 1.78 m (5 ft 10 in)
- Position: Midfielder

Youth career
- Pointe-Claire
- 2011–2014: Montreal Impact

Senior career*
Years	Team	Apps	(Gls)
2014	Montreal Impact U23	8	(0)
2014–2015	Montreal Impact	1	(0)
2015–2016	FC Montreal	41	(4)
2017–2018	Montreal Impact	11	(0)
2019	Valour FC	21	(1)
2020	HFX Wanderers	10	(0)
2021–2022	Gudja United	11	(1)

International career^{‡}
2013	Canada U18	1	(0)
2014–2015	Canada U20	10	(0)
2015–2017	Canada U23	7	(0)
- * Club domestic league appearances and goals as of January 19, 2022 ‡ National team caps and goals as of 00:41, March 29, 2017 (UTC)

Louis Béland-Goyette (born September 15, 1995) is a Canadian professional soccer player who plays as a midfielder.

== Club career ==
=== Montreal Impact ===
Béland-Goyette began 2014 with USL PDL club Montreal Impact U23, where he made 8 appearances.

He signed his first professional contract with the Montreal Impact on September 12, 2014. He made his debut as a 75th-minute substitute during a 1–2 loss to the New England Revolution a day later on September 13. On March 26, 2015, Béland-Goyette was removed from Montreal's first team roster and added to FC Montreal, ahead of their inaugural season in the USL. He made his debut against Toronto FC II on March 28.

After two seasons with FC Montreal in which he captained the team, Béland-Goyette signed with the first team for a second time in November 2016.

Béland-Goyette was released by Montreal at the end of their 2018 season.

=== Valour FC ===
On April 9, 2019, Béland-Goyette signed with Canadian Premier League side Valour FC. He made his debut in Valour's inaugural game against Pacific FC on May 1. Béland-Goyette scored his first goal for Valour on August 19 against FC Edmonton.

=== HFX Wanderers ===
On January 8, 2020, Béland-Goyette signed with HFX Wanderers. He made his debut on August 15 against Pacific FC.

== International career ==
Béland-Goyette has represented Canada at the U-18 and U-20 level. He was a part of the U-20 squad that went to the 2014 Milk Cup. He later made the team for the 2015 CONCACAF U-20 Championship and the Canadian U23 national team at the 2015 Pan American Games. In May 2016, Béland-Goyette was called to Canada's U23 national team for a pair of friendlies against Guyana and Grenada. He saw action in both matches.

In October 2017, Béland-Goyette received his first call-up to the Canadian senior team for a friendly against El Salvador, but didn't appear in the match.

== Honours ==
HFX Wanderers

- Canadian Premier League
  - Runners-up: 2020
