= Hernán Bernardello =

Argentine footballer (born 1986)

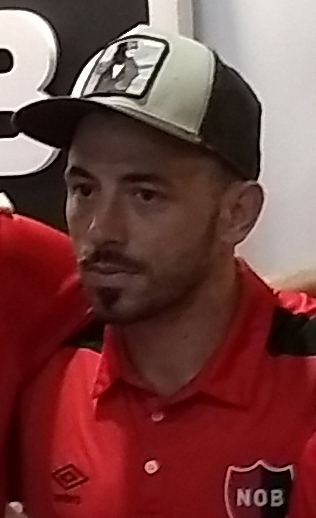
- Bernardello with Newell's Old Boys in 2018

Personal information
- Full name: Hernán Darío Bernardello
- Date of birth: 3 August 1986 (age 40)
- Place of birth: Rosario, Argentina
- Height: 1.74 m (5 ft 9 in)
- Position: Defensive midfielder

Youth career
- Newell's Old Boys

Senior career*
| Years | Team | Apps | (Gls) |
| 2006–2009 | Newell's Old Boys | 82 | (3) |
| 2009–2013 | Almería | 100 | (2) |
| 2012–2013 | → Colón (loan) | 25 | (1) |
| 2013–2014 | Montreal Impact | 19 | (0) |
| 2014–2015 | Cruz Azul | 8 | (0) |
| 2015–2016 | Newell's Old Boys | 18 | (0) |
| 2016 | Alavés | 13 | (1) |
| 2016–2017 | Montreal Impact | 39 | (1) |
| 2018–2019 | Newell's Old Boys | 23 | (0) |
| 2019 | → Godoy Cruz (loan) | 6 | (0) |
| 2019–2022 | Belgrano | 44 | (0) |

International career
| 2009 | Argentina | 1 | (0) |
- * Club domestic league appearances and goals as of 07:43, 17 July 2023 (UTC)

Hernán Darío Bernardello (born 3 August 1986) is a former Argentine footballer who played as a defensive midfielder.

== Club career ==
=== Newell's Old Boys ===
Born in Rosario, Santa Fe, Bernardello made his professional debuts in 2006 with Newell's Old Boys, going on to play in three full Primera División seasons with the club.

He scored his first goal for the Rosario-based team in a match against Argentinos Juniors, a 4–0 win.

=== Almería ===
On 20 July 2009, Bernardello signed a six-year deal with UD Almería in Spain, who paid €3 million for his services. He made his La Liga debut on 30 August in a 0–0 home draw against Real Valladolid, and only missed eight matches for the Andalusians in his first two seasons combined, suffering relegation in his second.

On 26 July 2012, Bernardello moved on loan to Club Atlético Colón.

=== Montreal Impact ===
On 23 July 2013, the Montreal Impact in the Major League Soccer signed Bernardello as a designated player, with the club's director of football, Nick De Santis, describing him as a player with "great quality in midfield", "great technical skills and great ability to relaunch attacks". He made his debut on 7 August in a 1–0 home win over the San Jose Earthquakes for the season's CONCACAF Champions League, where he provided the assist for the winning goal.

Bernadello parted ways with Montreal on 1 July 2014, after failing to agree new terms.

== International career ==
On 20 May 2009, Bernardello made his debut for Argentina, in a friendly match with Panama. The national team, solely made up of players based in the domestic league, won it 3–1.

== Honours ==
Montreal Impact

- Canadian Championship: 2014

Alavés

- Segunda División: 2015–16
