= 2019 Montreal Impact season =

Canadian Major League Soccer team

Montreal Impact
2019 season
- Owner: Joey Saputo
- President: Kevin Gilmore
- Coach: Wílmer Cabrera
- Stadium: Saputo Stadium
- Major League Soccer: Conference: 9th Overall: 18th
- MLS Cup Playoffs: Did not qualify
- Canadian Championship: Champions
- Top goalscorer: League: Saphir Taïder (9); All: Saphir Taïder (10)
- Highest home attendance: 19,619 (July 13 vs. Toronto FC)
- Lowest home attendance: 11,966 (May 29 vs. Real Salt Lake)
- Average home league attendance: 15,983
- Biggest win: 4–0 (July 27 vs Philadelphia)
- Biggest defeat: 1–7 (March 30 at Sporting KC)
Home colours	Away colours

The 2019 Montreal Impact season was the club's 26th season of existence, and their eighth in Major League Soccer, the top tier of the Canadian soccer pyramid.

== Squad ==
As of September 23, 2019

No.	Name	Nationality	Position	Date of birth (age At Year End)	Previous club
Goalkeepers
1	Evan Bush	USA	GK	March 6, 1986 (age 40)	(Canada) Montreal Impact (NASL)
23	Clément Diop	SEN	GK	October 12, 1993 (age 33)	(United States) LA Galaxy
41	James Pantemis	CAN	GK	February 21, 1997 (age 29)	(Canada) FC Montreal
Defenders
2	Víctor Cabrera	ARG	CB	February 7, 1993 (age 33)	(Argentina) River Plate
3	Daniel Lovitz	(United States) US	LB	August 27, 1991 (age 35)	(Canada) Toronto FC
4	Rudy Camacho	FRA	CB	March 5, 1991 (age 35)	(Belgium) Waasland-Beveren
15	Zachary Brault-Guillard	CAN	RB	December 30, 1998 (age 27)	(France) Lyon
16	Rod Fanni	FRA	CB	December 6, 1981 (age 44)	(France) Marseille
22	Jukka Raitala	FIN	LB	September 15, 1988 (age 38)	(United States) Los Angeles FC
25	Daniel Kinumbe	CAN	RB	March 15, 1999 (age 27)	(Canada) Ottawa Fury
24	Karifa Yao	CAN	CB	September 20, 2000 (age 26)	(Canada) Montreal Impact Academy
26	Jorge Corrales	CUB	LB	May 20, 1991 (age 35)	(United States) Chicago Fire
33	Bacary Sagna	FRA	RB	February 14, 1983 (age 43)	(Italy) Benevento
Midfielders
6	Samuel Piette	CAN	DM	November 12, 1994 (age 32)	(Spain) CD Izarra
8	Saphir Taïder	ALG	DM	February 29, 1992 (age 34)	(Italy) Bologna
10	Ignacio Piatti	ARG	AM	February 4, 1985 (age 41)	(Argentina) San Lorenzo
13	Ken Krolicki	JPN	DM	March 16, 1996 (age 30)	(United States) Michigan State Spartans
14	Amar Sejdič	BIH	AM	November 29, 1996 (age 29)	(United States) Maryland Terrapins
17	Ballou Tabla	CAN	AM	March 31, 1999 (age 27)	(Spain) Barcelona B
27	Clément Bayiha	CAN	RB	March 8, 1999 (age 27)	(Canada) Ottawa Fury
28	Shamit Shome	CAN	AM	September 5, 1997 (age 29)	(Canada) FC Edmonton
29	Mathieu Choinière	CAN	AM	February 7, 1999 (age 27)	(Canada) Montreal Impact Academy
Attackers
9	Bojan	ESP	ST	August 28, 1990 (age 36)	(England) Stoke City
11	Anthony Jackson-Hamel	CAN	ST	August 3, 1993 (age 33)	(Canada) Montreal Impact Academy
18	Orji Okwonkwo	NGA	FW	January 19, 1998 (age 28)	(Italy) Bologna
21	Lassi Lappalainen	FIN	FW	August 24, 1998 (age 28)	(Italy) Bologna
37	Maximiliano Urruti	ARG	FW	February 22, 1991 (age 35)	(United States) FC Dallas

=== International roster slots ===
Montreal has ten MLS International Roster Slots for use in the 2018 season. Montreal has eight slots allotted from the league and the team acquired three spots in trades with the Columbus Crew SC, Colorado Rapids and FC Cincinnati.

Montreal Impact International slots
Slot	Player	Nationality
1	Ignacio Piatti	Argentina
2	Víctor Cabrera	Argentina
3	Jukka Raitala	Finland
4	Saphir Taïder	Algeria
5	Rudy Camacho	France
6	Bacary Sagna	France
7	Orji Okwonkwo	Nigeria
8	Lassi Lappalainen	Finland
9	Bojan	Spain
10	Rod Fanni	France
11	Vacant	

Foreign-Born Players with Domestic Status
Player	Nationality
Clément Diop	Senegal ^{G}
Ken Krolicki	Japan ^{G}
Amar Sejdič	Bosnia and Herzegovina ^{G}
Maximiliano Urruti	Argentina ^{G}
Jorge Corrales	Cuba ^{G}
Clément Bayiha	Cameroon / Canada
Ballou Tabla	Ivory Coast / Canada
Zachary Brault-Guillard	Haiti / Canada

- (Canada) – Player is Canadian citizen;
- (United States) – Player is US citizen;
- G – Player has US green card;
- C – Player has permanent Canadian residency.

== Player movement ==
=== In ===
Per Major League Soccer and club policies terms of the deals do not get disclosed.

No.	Pos.	Player	Transferred from	Fee/notes	Date	Source
27	DF	(Canada) Clément Bayiha	(Canada) Ottawa Fury FC	Signed as a Homegrown Player	November 16, 2018	
25	DF	(Canada) Daniel Kinumbe	(Canada) Ottawa Fury FC	Signed as a Homegrown Player	November 16, 2018	
7	FW	(France) Harry Novillo	(Malaysia) Johor Darul Ta'zim	Free Transfer	December 5, 2018	
37	FW	(Argentina) Maximiliano Urruti	(United States) FC Dallas	Traded for $75,000 TAM and a 1st round pick in the MLS SuperDraft	December 9, 2018	
14	MF	(Bosnia and Herzegovina) Amar Sejdič	(United States) Maryland Terrapins	MLS SuperDraft	March 26, 2019	
24	DF	(Canada) Karifa Yao	(Canada) Montreal Impact Academy	Signed as a Homegrown Player	June 4, 2019	
9	FW	(Spain) Bojan	(England) Stoke City	Free Transfer	August 7, 2019	
26	DF	(Cuba) Jorge Corrales	(United States) Chicago Fire	Traded for Michael Azira, allocation swap and 2nd round Pick	August 8, 2019	

=== Out ===
No.	Pos.	Player	Transferred to	Fee/notes	Date	Source
19	FW	(Belize) Michael Salazar	(United States) Rio Grande Valley FC Toros	Option not picked up	November 26, 2018	
25	MF	(Canada) Louis Béland-Goyette	(Canada) Valour FC	Option not picked up	November 26, 2018	
26	DF	(United States) Kyle Fisher	(United States) Birmingham Legion FC	Option not picked up	November 26, 2018	
17	MF	(Canada) David Choinière	(Canada) Forge FC	Option not picked up	November 26, 2018	
40	GK	(Canada) Maxime Crépeau	(Canada) Vancouver Whitecaps FC	Traded for $50,000 TAM and a 3rd round pick in the MLS SuperDraft	December 9, 2018	
18	DF	(United States) Chris Duvall	(United States) Houston Dynamo	Traded for a 3rd round pick in the 2020 MLS SuperDraft	December 17, 2018	
9	FW	(Uruguay) Alejandro Silva	(Paraguay) Olimpia	$4,000,000 Transfer Fee	January 7, 2019	
21	FW	(Italy) Matteo Mancosu	(Italy) Virtus Entella	Free Transfer	January 8, 2019	
24	DF	(Canada) Michael Petrasso	(Canada) Valour FC	Released	January 15, 2019	
30	FW	(United States) Quincy Amarikwa	(United States) D.C. United	Out of contract	January 20, 2019	
7	FW	(France) Harry Novillo	Retired		July 22, 2019	
32	MF	(Uganda) Michael Azira	(United States) Chicago Fire	with a 2nd round pick for Jorge Corrales and Allocation swap	August 8, 2019	
5	DF	(France) Zakaria Diallo	(France) Lens	Transfer Fee	August 14, 2019	

=== Loans in ===
No.	Pos.	Player	Loaned from	Loan start date	Loan end date	Source
15	DF	(Canada) Zachary Brault-Guillard	(France) Lyon	February 5, 2019	December 31, 2019	
18	FW	(Nigeria) Orji Okwonkwo	(Italy) Bologna	February 12, 2019	December 31, 2019	
19	FW	(Panama) Omar Browne	(Panama) Independiente	April 16, 2019	August 12, 2019	
34	MF	(Canada) Luca Ricci	(Canada) Ottawa Fury FC	June 4, 2019	June 6, 2019	
21	FW	(Finland) Lassi Lappalainen	(Italy) Bologna	July 25, 2019	December 31, 2019	
17	MF	(Canada) Ballou Tabla	(Spain) Barcelona B	August 7, 2019	December 31, 2019	

=== Loans out ===
No.	Pos.	Player	Loaned to	Loan start date	Loan end date	Source
26	DF	(Canada) Thomas Meilleur-Giguère	(Canada) Ottawa Fury FC	January 20, 2019	December 31, 2019	
16	MF	(Chile) Jeisson Vargas	(Chile) Club Deportivo Universidad Católica	February 8, 2019	December 31, 2019	
25	DF	(Canada) Daniel Kinumbe	(Canada) Ottawa Fury FC	February 13, 2019	April 26, 2019	
14	MF	(Bosnia and Herzegovina) Amar Sejdič	(Canada) Ottawa Fury FC	April 26, 2019	May 6, 2019	
40	GK	(Canada) Jason Beaulieu	(Canada) Ottawa Fury FC	July 18, 2019	December 31, 2019	

=== Draft picks ===
Round	No.	Pos.	Player	College/Club team	Transaction	Source
2(34)	14	MF	(Bosnia and Herzegovina) Amar Sejdič	(United States) Maryland	Signed	
3(58)	Passed					
4(82)	Passed					
4(92)	Passed					

== International caps ==
Players called for senior international duty during the 2019 season while under contract with the Montreal Impact.

Nationality	Position	Player	Competition	Date	Opponent	Minutes played	Score
(United States) USA	DF	Daniel Lovitz	Friendly	January 27, 2019	v Panama	90'	3–0
(United States) USA	DF	Daniel Lovitz	Friendly	February 2, 2019	v Costa Rica	90'	2–0
Canada	DF	Zachary Brault-Guillard	CONCACAF Nations League qualifying	March 24, 2019	v French Guiana	90'	4–1
Canada	MF	Samuel Piette	CONCACAF Nations League qualifying	March 24, 2019	v French Guiana	90'	4–1
(United States) USA	DF	Daniel Lovitz	Friendly	March 26, 2019	v Chile	36'	1–1
Algeria	MF	Saphir Taïder	Friendly	March 26, 2019	v Tunisia	90'	1–0
(United States) USA	DF	Daniel Lovitz	Friendly	June 5, 2019	v Jamaica	10'	0–1
Finland	DF	Jukka Raitala	UEFA Euro 2020 qualifying	June 8, 2019	v Bosnia and Herzegovina	52'	2–0
(United States) USA	DF	Daniel Lovitz	Friendly	June 9, 2019	v Venezuela	12'	0–3
Finland	DF	Jukka Raitala	UEFA Euro 2020 qualifying	June 11, 2019	v Liechtenstein	87'	2–0
Uganda	MF	Micheal Azira	Friendly	June 15, 2019	v Ivory Coast	90'	1–0
Canada	MF	Samuel Piette	CONCACAF Gold Cup group stage	June 15, 2019	v Martinique	90'	4–0
Panama	FW	Omar Browne	CONCACAF Gold Cup group stage	June 18, 2019	v Trinidad and Tobago	1'	2-0
Canada	DF	Zachary Brault-Guillard	CONCACAF Gold Cup group stage	June 19, 2019	v Mexico	90'	1–3
Uganda	MF	Micheal Azira	Africa Cup of Nations group stage	June 22, 2019	v DR Congo	90'	2–0
Canada	MF	Samuel Piette	CONCACAF Gold Cup group stage	June 23, 2019	v Cuba	90'	7–0
Uganda	MF	Micheal Azira	Africa Cup of Nations group stage	June 26, 2019	v Zimbabwe	90'	1–1
Panama	FW	Omar Browne	CONCACAF Gold Cup group stage	June 26, 2019	v USA	90'	0-1
(United States) USA	DF	Daniel Lovitz	CONCACAF Gold Cup group stage	June 26, 2019	v Panama	90'	1–0
Panama	FW	Omar Browne	CONCACAF Gold Cup quarter-finals	June 30, 2019	v Jamaica	30'	0-1
Uganda	MF	Micheal Azira	Africa Cup of Nations group stage	June 30, 2019	v Egypt	90'	0–2
(United States) USA	DF	Daniel Lovitz	CONCACAF Gold Cup Semi-finals	July 3, 2019	v Jamaica	2'	3–1
Uganda	MF	Micheal Azira	Africa Cup of Nations Round of 16	July 5, 2019	v Senegal	90'	0–1
(United States) USA	DF	Daniel Lovitz	CONCACAF Gold Cup Finals	July 3, 2019	v Mexico	7'	0–1
Finland	DF	Jukka Raitala	UEFA Euro 2020 qualifying	September 5, 2019	v Greece	90'	1–0
(United States) USA	DF	Daniel Lovitz	Friendly	September 6, 2019	v Mexico	22'	0–3
Canada	MF	Samuel Piette	2019–20 CONCACAF Nations League A	September 7, 2019	v Cuba	90'	6–0
Finland	FW	Lassi Lappalainen	UEFA Euro 2020 qualifying	September 8, 2019	v Italy	75'	1–2
(United States) USA	DF	Daniel Lovitz	Friendly	September 10, 2019	v Uruguay	20'	1–1
(United States) USA	DF	Daniel Lovitz	2019–20 CONCACAF Nations League A	October 11, 2019	v Cuba	90'	7–0
Finland	DF	Jukka Raitala	UEFA Euro 2020 qualifying	October 12, 2019	v Bosnia and Herzegovina	90'	1–4
Finland	DF	Jukka Raitala	UEFA Euro 2020 qualifying	October 15, 2019	v Armenia	90'	3–0
Finland	DF	Lassi Lappalainen	UEFA Euro 2020 qualifying	October 15, 2019	v Armenia	61'	3–0
Canada	MF	Samuel Piette	2019–20 CONCACAF Nations League A	October 15, 2019	v USA	90'	2–0
(United States) USA	DF	Daniel Lovitz	2019–20 CONCACAF Nations League A	October 15, 2019	v Canada	90'	0–2
Finland	DF	Jukka Raitala	UEFA Euro 2020 qualifying	November 15, 2019	v Liechtenstein	90'	3–0
Canada	MF	Samuel Piette	2019–20 CONCACAF Nations League A	November 15, 2019	v USA	90'	1–4
Finland	DF	Jukka Raitala	UEFA Euro 2020 qualifying	November 18, 2019	v Greece	90'	1–2
(United States) USA	DF	Daniel Lovitz	2019–20 CONCACAF Nations League A	November 18, 2019	v Cuba	90'	4–0

== Friendlies ==
=== Review ===
Montreal Impact had a successful Pre-Season time, winning over Nashville, Philadelphia, D.C. United and tying versus Cincinnati and Tampa Bay Rowdies.

=== Pre-season ===
Win Draw Loss

January 30 Preseason	FC Cincinnati	1–1	Montreal Impact	Bradenton, Florida
7:00 pm (EST)	Mattocks 49'; Lasso (yellow card) 68'	CIN Report; MTL Report	Piatti 11', (yellow card) 36'; Diallo (yellow card) 29'	Stadium: IMG Academy

February 6 Preseason	Montreal Impact	2–0	Nashville SC	Lakewood Ranch, Florida
4:00 pm (EST)	Diallo 71'; Novillo 80'	Report		Stadium: Premier Sports Complex

February 16 Preseason	Montreal Impact	1–0	Philadelphia Union	St. Petersburg, Florida
4:00 pm (EST)	Urruti 27'	Report	Elliott (yellow card) 46'; Fontana (yellow card) 89'; Accam (yellow card) 90'	Stadium: Al Lang Stadium

February 20 Preseason	Tampa Bay Rowdies	0–0	Montreal Impact	St. Petersburg, Florida
7:00 pm (EST)	Fernandes (yellow card) 77'; Poku (yellow card) 78'; Hoppenot (yellow card) 90'	Report	Jackson-Hamel (yellow card) 23'	Stadium: Al Lang Stadium

February 23 Preseason	D.C. United	0–3	Montreal Impact	St. Petersburg, Florida
7:00 pm (EST)	Canouse (yellow card) 53'	Report	Piatti 8'; Urruti 78'; Choinière (yellow card) 88', (goal) 90+1'	Stadium: Al Lang Stadium

== Major League Soccer ==
=== Review ===
==== March ====
- On March 2, Montreal Impact defeated San Jose Earthquakes in their first Major League Soccer match with a score of 2 to 1, Piatti and Taïder scoring for Montreal.
- Montreal Impact lost their second regular season match versus Houston Dynamo.
- On March 16, Montreal's Zakaria Diallo received a late red card versus Orlando City SC for pushing Dom Dwyer in a 3-1 win.

=== Tables ===
==== Eastern Conference ====
2019 MLS Eastern Conference standings
Pos	Team	Pld	W	L	T	GF	GA	GD	Pts	Qualification
7	New England Revolution	34	11	11	12	50	57	−7	45	Qualification for the first round
8	Chicago Fire	34	10	12	12	55	47	+8	42	
9	Montreal Impact	34	12	17	5	47	60	−13	41	
10	Columbus Crew SC	34	10	16	8	39	47	−8	38	
11	Orlando City SC	34	9	15	10	44	52	−8	37	

Source: MLS
Rules for classification: 1) points; 2) total wins; 3) total goal differential; 4) total goals scored; 5) disciplinary points; 6) away goal differential; 7) away goals scored; 8) home goals scored; 9) home goal differential; 10) coin toss or drawing of lots.

==== Overall ====
2019 MLS regular season standings
Pos	Team	Pld	W	L	T	GF	GA	GD	Pts	
16	Colorado Rapids	34	12	16	6	58	63	−5	42	
17	Chicago Fire	34	10	12	12	55	47	+8	42	
18	Montreal Impact (V)	34	12	17	5	47	60	−13	41	Qualification for the CONCACAF Champions League
19	Houston Dynamo	34	12	18	4	49	59	−10	40	
20	Columbus Crew SC	34	10	16	8	39	47	−8	38	

Source: MLS
Rules for classification: 1) points; 2) total wins; 3) total goal differential; 4) total goals scored; 5) disciplinary points; 6) away goals scored; 7) away goal differential; 8) coin toss or drawing of lots
(V) Canadian Championship winners

==== Results summary ====
Overall								Home						Away					
Pld	Pts	W	L	D	GF	GA	GD	W	L	D	GF	GA	GD	W	L	D	GF	GA	GD
26	33	10	13	3	36	47	−11	6	4	1	14	13	+1	4	9	2	22	34	−12

Last updated: August 17, 2019
Source: 2019 Major League Soccer season
Pld = Matches played; Pts = Points; W = Matches won; D = Matches drawn; L = Matches lost; GF = Goals for; GA = Goals against; GD = Goal difference

===== Results by round =====
Round	1	2	3	4	5	6	7	8	9	10	11	12	13	14	15	16	17	18	19	20	21	22	23	24	25	26	27	28	29	30	31	32	33	34
Ground	A	A	A	A	A	A	H	A	A	H	H	A	A	H	A	H	H	H	H	A	H	H	A	H	A									
Result	W	L	W	L	D	D	W	L	W	W	L	W	L	D	L	W	L	W	W	L	L	L	L	W	L									
Position (conf.)	3	4	2	5	7	7	3	6	2																15									

Updated to match(es) played on March 3, 2019. Source: Match reports
A = Away; H = Home; W = Win; D = Draw; L = Loss

==== Matches ====
Unless otherwise noted, all times in EST

March 2 1	San Jose Earthquakes	1–2	Montreal Impact	San Jose, California
10:00 pm (EST)	Eriksson 11'; Cummings (yellow card) 66'; Thompson (yellow card) 73'; Judson (yellow card) 77'	Report	Piatti 29'; Taïder 44'; Sagna (yellow card) 45+1'; Azira (yellow card) 58'; Choinière (yellow card) 82'; Bush (yellow card) 90+5'	Stadium: Avaya Stadium; Attendance: 18,000; Referee: Joseph Dickerson

March 9 2	Houston Dynamo	2–1	Montreal Impact	Houston, Texas
5:00 pm (EST)	Rodríguez 36'; García (yellow card) 74'; Quioto (yellow card) 77'; Manotas 86'	Report	Taïder 34'; Sagna (yellow card) 77'; Cabrera (yellow card) 88'	Stadium: BBVA Compass Stadium; Attendance: 12,601; Referee: Ismail Elfath

March 16 3	Orlando City SC	1–3	Montreal Impact	Orlando, Florida
4:00 pm (EST)	Dwyer 90+1'	Report	Okwonkwo 14'; Piatti 15', 80'; Diallo (red card) 90+6'	Stadium: Orlando City Stadium; Attendance: 22,352; Referee: Timothy Ford

March 30 4	Sporting KC	7–1	Montreal Impact	Kansas City, Kansas
3:00 pm (EST)	Russell 10', 50'; Németh 43', 68', 84'; Gutiérrez 45+2'; Busio 78'	Report	Taïder 89'	Stadium: Children's Mercy Park; Attendance: 18,632; Referee: Nima Saghafi

April 6 5	New York City FC	0–0	Montreal Impact	New York, New York
1:00 pm (EST)	Matarrita (yellow card) 32'; Sands (yellow card) 90+3'	Report	Novillo (yellow card) 59'; Piette (yellow card) 63'; Urruti (red card) 70'; Sagna (yellow card) 72'	Stadium: Yankee Stadium; Attendance: 19,353; Referee: Ted Unkel

April 9 6	D.C. United	0–0	Montreal Impact	Washington, D.C.
8:00 pm (EST)	Arriola (yellow card) 27'; Jara (yellow card) 40'	Report	Shome (yellow card) 49'; Taïder (yellow card) 62'	Stadium: Audi Field; Attendance: 18,116; Referee: Chris Penso

April 13 7	Montreal Impact	1–0	Columbus Crew SC	Montreal, Quebec
1:00 pm (EST)	Novillo 55'	Report	Jonathan (yellow card) 90+4'	Stadium: Saputo Stadium; Attendance: 18,634; Referee: Armando Villarreal

April 20 8	Philadelphia Union	3–0	Montreal Impact	Chester, Pennsylvania
1:00 pm (EST)	Burke 14' (yellow card) 67'; Monteiro 45' (pen.); Bedoya 57'; Medunjanin (yellow card) 62'; Wagner (red card) 90'	Report; Box Score	Bush (yellow card) 78'	Stadium: Talen Energy Stadium; Attendance: 15,407; Referee: Robert Sibiga

April 24 9	New England Revolution	0–3	Montreal Impact	Foxborough, Massachusetts
1:00 pm (EST)	Caldwell (yellow card) 58'	Report	Piette (yellow card) 72'; Shome 79'; Jackson-Hamel 85', 90+3'	Stadium: Gillette Stadium; Attendance: 9422; Referee: Nima Saghafi

April 28 10	Montreal Impact	1–0	Chicago Fire	Montreal, Quebec
12:30 pm (EST)	Sagna (yellow card) 78'; Browne 83'	Report	Kappelhof (yellow card) 90+5'	Stadium: Saputo Stadium; Attendance: 15,758; Referee: Rubiel Vazquez

May 4 11	Montreal Impact	0–2	New York City FC	Montreal, Quebec
5:00 pm (EST)	Lovitz (yellow card) 31'; Taïder (yellow card) 40'	Report	Moralez 6', (yellow card) 54'; Tajouri-Shradi 49'; Ring (yellow card) 64'	Stadium: Saputo Stadium; Attendance: 16,961; Referee: Baldomero Toledo

May 8 12	New York Red Bulls	1–2	Montreal Impact	Harrison, New Jersey
8:00 pm (EST)	Tarek (yellow card) 23'; Long 36'; Parker (yellow card) 63'	Report	Urruti (yellow card) 51', (goal) 79' (pen.); Diallo 64'; Piette (yellow card) 73'	Stadium: Red Bull Arena; Attendance: 11,115; Referee: Alex Chilowicz

May 11 13	FC Cincinnati	2–1	Montreal Impact	Cincinnati, Ohio
1:00 pm (EST)	Cruz 7'; Alashe 62'	Report	Azira (yellow card) 47'; Okwonkwo 75'; Sagna (yellow card) 87'	Stadium: Nippert Stadium; Attendance: 26,258; Referee: Joseph Dickerson

May 18 14	Montreal Impact	0–0	New England Revolution	Montreal, Quebec
1:00 pm (EDT)	Piatti (yellow card) 79'; Shome (yellow card) 82'; Brault-Guillard (yellow card) 89'; Piette (yellow card) 90+5'	Report	Caicedo (yellow card) 21'; Farrell (yellow card) 56'; Agudelo (yellow card) 66'	Stadium: Saputo Stadium; Attendance: 15,559; Referee: Ramy Touchan

May 24 15	Los Angeles FC	4–2	Montreal Impact	Los Angeles, California
10:30 pm (EST)	Ramirez 7'; Vela 28'; Blessing 31'; Blackmon 55'; Zimmerman (yellow card) 83'	Report	Segura 70' (o.g.); Taïder 84' (pen.)	Stadium: Banc of California Stadium; Attendance: 22,444; Referee: Armando Villarreal

May 29 16	Montreal Impact	2–1	Real Salt Lake	Montreal, Quebec
7:30 pm (EST)	Piette (yellow card) 36'; Browne 45+2'; Taider 68' (pen.); Sagna (yellow card) 83'	Report	Kreilach (yellow card) 59'; Portillo (yellow card) 60'; Johnson 84'	Stadium: Saputo Stadium; Attendance: 11,966; Referee: Fotis Bazakos

June 1 17	Montreal Impact	0–3	Orlando City SC	Montreal, Quebec
5:00 pm (EST)	Urruti (yellow card) 45'	Report	Nani 27' (pen.); Akindele 36'; Johnson 42'; Moutinho (yellow card) 49'	Stadium: Saputo Stadium; Attendance: 17,018; Referee: Chris Penso

June 5 18	Montreal Impact	2–1	Seattle Sounders FC	Montreal, Quebec
7:30 pm (EST)	Camacho (yellow card) 31'; Taïder 74' (pen.), 78'	Preview	Nouhou (yellow card) 56'; Delem (yellow card) 61'; Rodríguez 64' (pen.)	Stadium: Stade Saputo; Attendance: 13,037; Referee: Nima Saghafi

June 26 19	Montreal Impact	2–1	Portland Timbers	Montreal, Quebec, Canada
16:30 PST	Okwonkwo 28', 66'; Shome (yellow card) 32'; Cabrera (yellow card) 90+3'	Report	Conechny, (yellow card) 57'; Farfan (yellow card) 77'	Stadium: Saputo Stadium; Attendance: 15,167; Referee: Rubiel Vazquez

June 29 20	Atlanta United FC	2–1	Montreal Impact	Atlanta, Georgia
6:00 p.m. EDT	Meram 35', 83'; Vazquez (yellow card) 40'; Nagbe (yellow card) 57'; Escobar (yellow card) 67'	Report	Krolicki (yellow card) 41'; Diallo 50'; Raitala (yellow card) 90'	Stadium: Mercedes-Benz Stadium; Attendance: 44,627; Referee: Ramy Touchan

July 6 21	Montreal Impact	2–3	Minnesota United FC	Montreal, Quebec
7:30 p.m. EDT	Jackson-Hamel 1'; Camacho 13'; Bush (yellow card) 45+1'	Report	Toye 9', 47'; Finlay 45+2' (pen.)	Stadium: Saputo Stadium; Attendance: 16,796; Referee: Alan Kelly

July 13 22	Montreal Impact	0–2	Toronto FC	Montreal, Quebec
7:30 PM EDT	Lovitz (yellow card) 60'	Report	Mavinga (yellow card) 25'; Pozuelo 61'; Altidore 90+5'	Stadium: Saputo Stadium; Attendance: 19,619; Referee: Drew Fischer

July 20 23	Columbus Crew SC	2–1	Montreal Impact	Columbus, Ohio
7:30 PM EDT	Williams 6' (yellow card) 53'; Artur (yellow card) 17'; Accam 46'	Report	Diallo 45+2'; Sagna (red card) 55'; Browne (yellow card) 90+6'	Stadium: Mapfre Stadium; Attendance: 15,124; Referee: Robert Sibiga

July 27 24	Montreal Impact	4–0	Philadelphia Union	Montreal, Quebec
8:00 p.m. EDT	Lappalainen 4', 46'; Diallo (yellow card) 9'; Okwonkwo 36', 66'; Urruti (yellow card) 42'; Camacho (yellow card) 76'	Report; Box Score	Fabián (yellow card) 82'	Stadium: Saputo Stadium; Attendance: 16,344; Referee: Jair Marrufo

August 3 25	Colorado Rapids	6–3	Montreal Impact	Commerce City, Colorado
9:00 PM EDT	Bush 21' (o.g.); Kamara 36' (pen.), 45+1', 90'; Rubio 45+4'; Abubakar (yellow card) 56'; Acosta (yellow card) 75'; Shinyashiki 78'	Report	Kamara 18' (o.g.); Urruti 55'; Taïder 76' (pen.); Krolicki (yellow card) 83'	Stadium: Dick's Sporting Goods Park; Attendance: 14,007; Referee: Marcos Deoliveira

August 10 26	Chicago Fire	3–2	Montreal Impact	Bridgeview, Illinois
9:00 PM EDT	Dax McCarty 8'; Nemanja Nikolić 19'; Bastian Schweinsteiger 88'	Report	Saphir Taïder 34'; Bacary Sagna 76'	Stadium: SeatGeek Stadium; Attendance: 11,002; Referee: Chris Penso

August 17 27	Montreal Impact	3–3	FC Dallas	Montreal, Quebec
7:30 PM EDT	Lappalainen 8', 45+1'; Okwonkwo 56' (yellow card) 68'; Raitala (yellow card) 81'; Lovitz (yellow card) 90+3'	Report	Ziegler (yellow card) 35' (goal) 85' (pen.); Acosta (yellow card) 35'; Ondrasek 59'; Hollingshead 90'; Barrios (yellow card) 90+3'	Stadium: Saputo Stadium; Attendance: 17,509; Referee: Ted Unkel

August 24 28	Toronto FC	2–1	Montreal Impact	Toronto, Ontario
7:30 PM EDT	Benezet (yellow card) 55'; Delgado 63'; Altidore (yellow card) 70'; Laryea (yellow card) 73'; Morrow (yellow card) 79', (goal) 81'	Report	Sagna (yellow card) 8'; Bojan 49'	Stadium: BMO Field; Attendance: 28,989; Referee: Baldomero Toledo

August 28 29	Montreal Impact	2–1	Whitecaps FC	Montreal, Quebec
8:00 PM EDT	Henry 35' (o.g.); Urruti 37', (yellow card) 51'	Report	Reyna 17'	Stadium: Saputo Stadium; Attendance: 14,513; Referee: Ismail Elfath

August 31 30	Montreal Impact	0–3	D.C. United	Montreal, Quebec
19:30 EST	Camacho (yellow card) 18'; Urruti (yellow card) 56'	Report	Kamara 20', 32'; Mora (yellow card) 21'; Arriola 23'	Stadium: Stade Saputo; Attendance: 18,285; Referee: Allen Chapman

September 14 31	Montreal Impact	0–1	FC Cincinnati	Montreal, Quebec
7:30PM EDT	Lovitz (yellow card) 44'; Okwonkwo (yellow card) 49'; Camacho (yellow card) 68'	Report	Cruz 1'; Waston (yellow card) 60' (yellow-red card) 88'	Stadium: Saputo Stadium; Attendance: 17,159; Referee: Ramy Touchan

September 21 32	LA Galaxy	2–1	Montreal Impact	Carson, California
7:30 PM	Dos Santos (yellow card) 29'; Ibrahimović 31'; Antuna 50'	Report	Lappalainen 48'	Stadium: Dignity Health Sports Park; Attendance: 25,482; Referee: Kevin Stott

September 29 33	Montreal Impact	1–1	Atlanta United FC	Montreal, Quebec
5:00 p.m. EDT	Bojan 81'	Report	Gressel 53'	Stadium: Saputo Stadium; Attendance: 15,557; Referee: Jair Marrufo

October 6 34	Montreal Impact	3–0	New York Red Bulls	Montreal, Quebec
4:00PM EST	Bojan 23'; Urruti 37'; Okwonkwo 62', (yellow card) 64'	Report		Stadium: Stade Saputo; Attendance: 15,022; Referee: Nima Saghafi

== Canadian Championship ==
=== Bracket ===
The draw was held on February 12, 2019.

First qualifying round May 15–22
PLSQ	AS Blainville	0	0	0
CPL	York9 FC	0	1	1
CPL	Pacific FC	0	1	1
CPL	Cavalry FC	2	2	4
L1O	Vaughan Azzurri	2	1	3
CPL	HFX Wanderers FC (a)	3	0	3

Second qualifying round June 4–12
CPL	FC Edmonton	1	1	2
CPL	York9 FC	3	0	3
CPL	Forge FC	1	1	2
CPL	Cavalry FC	1	2	3
CPL	Valour FC	1	0	1
CPL	HFX Wanderers FC	2	2	4

Third qualifying round July 10–24
MLS	Montreal Impact	2	1	3
CPL	York9 FC	2	0	2
MLS	Vancouver Whitecaps FC	0	1	1
CPL	Cavalry FC	0	2	2
USL	Ottawa Fury FC	3	2	5
CPL	HFX Wanderers FC	2	2	4

Semi-finals; August 7–14
MLS	Montreal Impact	2	1	3
CPL	Cavalry FC	1	0	1
MLS	Toronto FC	2	3	5
USL	Ottawa Fury FC	0	0	0

Final; September 18–25
MLS	Montreal Impact (p)	1	0	1 (3)
MLS	Toronto FC	0	1	1 (1)

=== Canadian Championship results ===
==== Third qualifying round ====
July 10 First leg	York9 FC	2–2	Montreal Impact	Toronto, Ontario
19:30	Telfer 83'; Gattas 88'	Report	Browne 62'; Taïder 90+2' (pen.)	Stadium: York Lions Stadium; Attendance: 5,252; Referee: Yusri Rudolf

July 24 Second leg	Montreal Impact	1–0 (3–2 agg.)	York 9 FC	Montreal, Quebec
19:30	Piatti 55' (pen.)	Report		Stadium: Saputo Stadium; Attendance: 14,723; Referee: David Barrie

==== Semi-final ====
August 7 First leg	Montreal Impact	2–1	Cavalry FC	Montreal, Quebec
7:30 pm ET	Piatti 32', 49'; Krolicki (yellow card) 34'; Okwonkwo (yellow card) 74'	Report	Ledgerwood (yellow card) 56' (yellow-red card) 71'; Camargo 69'	Stadium: Saputo Stadium; Attendance: 12,665; Referee: Silviu Petrescu

August 14 Second leg	Cavalry FC	0–1 (1–3 agg.)	Montreal Impact	Foothills County, Alberta
7:30 pm MT		Report	Jackson-Hamel 13'; Corrales (yellow card) 36'	Stadium: ATCO Field; Attendance: 5,633; Referee: Pierre-Luc Lauzière

===== Final =====
September 18 First leg	Montreal Impact	1–0 (1–0 agg.)	Toronto FC	Montreal, Quebec
7:30 PM EDT	Piatti 17'; Piette (yellow card) 34'; Taider (yellow card) 85'	Report		Stadium: Saputo Stadium; Attendance: 10,807; Referee: Yusri Rudolf

September 25 Second leg	Toronto FC	1–0 (1–1 agg.) (1–3 p)	Montreal Impact	Toronto, Ontario
7:30 PM EDT	Bradley (yellow card) 7'; Endoh 70'; Mavinga (red card) 84'	Report		Stadium: BMO Field; Attendance: 21,365; Referee: Drew Fischer
	Penalties
	Pozuelo (penalty scored); Altidore (penalty missed); Mullins (penalty missed); Osorio (penalty missed)		(penalty scored) Bojan; (penalty scored) Lovitz; (penalty scored) Camacho

== Statistics ==
=== Appearances, minutes played, and goals scored ===
No.	Nat.	Player	Total			Major League Soccer			Canadian Championship			MLS Playoffs			Ref.
No.	Nat.	Player	App.	Min.	Gls	App.	Min.	Gls	App.	Min.	Gls	App.	Min.	Gls	Ref.
Goalkeepers
1	(United States)	Evan Bush	32	2880	0	32	2880	0	0	0	0	0	0	0	
23	(Senegal)	Clément Diop	6	540	0	2	180	0	4	360	0	0	0	0	
40	(Canada)	Jason Beaulieu	0	0	0	0	0	0	0	0	0	0	0	0	
41	(Canada)	James Pantemis	2	180	0	0	0	0	2	180	0	0	0	0	
Defenders
2	(Argentina)	Víctor Cabrera	20	1529	0	16	1178	0	4	351	0	0	0	0	
3	(United States)	Daniel Lovitz	31	2601	0	28	2520	0	3	181	0	0	0	0	
4	(France)	Rudy Camacho	22	1914	1	17	1464	1	5	450	0	0	0	0	
15	(Canada)	Zachary Brault-Guillard	15	1051	0	13	871	0	2	180	0	0	0	0	
16	(France)	Rod Fanni	3	270	0	3	270	0	0	0	0	0	0	0	
22	(Finland)	Jukka Raitala	31	2452	0	26	2083	0	5	369	0	0	0	0	
24	(Canada)	Karifa Yao	0	0	0	0	0	0	0	0	0	0	0	0	
25	(Canada)	Daniel Kinumbe	2	157	0	1	67	0	1	90	0	0	0	0	
26	(Cuba)	Jorge Corrales	5	189	0	3	92	0	2	97	0	0	0	0	
33	(France)	Bacary Sagna	31	2630	1	26	2180	1	5	450	0	0	0	0	
Midfielders
6	(Canada)	Samuel Piette	29	2575	0	25	2220	0	4	355	0	0	0	0	
8	(Algeria)	Saphir Taïder	37	3033	10	32	2728	9	5	305	1	0	0	0	
10	(Argentina)	Ignacio Piatti	15	1092	7	11	757	3	4	335	4	0	0	0	
13	(Japan)	Ken Krolicki	14	814	0	10	523	0	4	291	0	0	0	0	
14	(Bosnia and Herzegovina)	Amar Sejdič	1	68	0	1	68	0	0	0	0	0	0	0	
17	(Canada)	Ballou Tabla	4	127	0	4	127	0	0	0	0	0	0	0	
27	(Canada)	Clément Bayiha	16	792	0	11	469	0	5	323	0	0	0	0	
28	(Canada)	Shamit Shome	32	1956	1	27	1627	1	5	329	0	0	0	0	
29	(Canada)	Mathieu Choinière	19	837	0	17	681	0	2	156	0	0	0	0	
Forwards
9	(Spain)	Bojan Krkić	10	743	3	8	608	3	2	135	0	0	0	0	
11	(Canada)	Anthony Jackson-Hamel	17	698	4	16	618	3	1	80	1	0	0	0	
18	(Nigeria)	Orji Okwonkwo	32	1845	8	28	1784	8	4	61	0	0	0	0	
21	(Finland)	Lassi Lappalainen	15	921	5	11	683	5	4	238	0	0	0	0	
37	(Argentina)	Maximiliano Urruti	37	2917	4	31	2436	4	6	481	0	0	0	0	
No Longer with the Club
5	(France)	Zakaria Diallo	26	2217	3	24	2037	3	2	180	0	0	0	0	
7	(France)	Harry Novillo	11	439	1	11	439	1	0	0	0	0	0	0	
19	(Panama)	Omar Browne	11	630	3	10	564	2	1	66	1	0	0	0	
32	(Uganda)	Michael Azira	20	1448	0	19	1443	0	1	5	0	0	0	0	
34	(Canada)	Luca Ricci	0	0	0	0	0	0	0	0	0	0	0	0	
Last updated: October 6, 2019

=== Top scorers ===
Rank	Nat.	Player	Pos.	MLS	Canadian Champ	MLS Playoffs	TOTAL
1	(Algeria)	Saphir Taïder	MF	9	1		10
2	(Nigeria)	Orji Okwonkwo	FW	8			8
3	(Argentina)	Ignacio Piatti	MF	3	4		7
4	(Finland)	Lassi Lappalainen	FW	5			5
5	(Canada)	Anthony Jackson-Hamel	FW	3	1		4
5	(Argentina)	Maximiliano Urruti	FW	4			4
7	(Panama)	Omar Browne	FW	2	1		3
7	(France)	Zakaria Diallo	DF	3			3
7	(Spain)	Bojan Krkić	FW	3			3
10	(Canada)	Shamit Shome	MF	1			1
10	(France)	Harry Novillo	FW	1			1
10	(France)	Rudy Camacho	DF	1			1
10	(France)	Bacary Sagna	DF	1			1
Totals				43	7	0	50

Updated to match played October 6, 2019
Source: Montreal Impact
Italic: denotes player left the club during the season.

=== Top Assists ===
Rank	Nat.	Player	Pos.	MLS	Canadian Champ	MLS Playoffs	TOTAL
1	(Algeria)	Saphir Taïder	MF	7	2		9
2	(Argentina)	Maximiliano Urruti	FW	6	1		7
3	(France)	Bacary Sagna	DF	3	1		4
4	(United States)	Daniel Lovitz	DF	2			2
4	(Panama)	Omar Browne	MF	2			2
4	(France)	Harry Novillo	FW	2			2
4	(France)	Zakaria Diallo	DF	2			2
4	(Canada)	Clément Bayiha	MF	1	1		2
4	(Nigeria)	Orji Okwonkwo	FW	2			2
9	(Uganda)	Micheal Azira	MF	1			1
9	(Canada)	Shamit Shome	MF	1			1
9	(Argentina)	Ignacio Piatti	MF	1			1
9	(Canada)	Zachary Brault-Guillard	DF	1			1
9	(Canada)	Mathieu Choinière	MF	1			1
9	(Cuba)	Jorge Corrales	DF	1			1
9	(Finland)	Lassi Lappalainen	FW	1			1
Totals				33	5	0	38

Updated to match played October 6, 2019
Source: Montreal Impact
Italic: denotes player left the club during the season.

=== Goals against average ===
No.	Nat.	Player	Total			Major League Soccer			Canadian Championship			MLS Playoffs		
No.	Nat.	Player	MIN	GA	GAA	MIN	GA	GAA	MIN	GA	GAA	MIN	GA	GAA
1	US	Evan Bush	2880	59	1.84	2880	59	1.84	0	0	0.00	0	0	0.00
23	SEN	Clément Diop	540	4	0.67	180	1	0.50	360	3	0.75	0	0	0.00
41	CAN	James Pantemis	180	1	0.50	0	0	0.00	180	1	0.50	0	0	0.00

Updated to match played October 6, 2019
Source: Montreal Impact
Italic: denotes player left the club during the season.

=== Clean sheets ===
No.	Nat.	Player	MLS	Canadian Championship	MLS Cup Playoffs	TOTAL
1	(United States)	Evan Bush	7			7
23	(Senegal)	Clément Diop	1	2		3
41	(Canada)	James Pantemis		1		1
Totals			8	3	0	11

Updated to match played October 6, 2019
Source: MLSsoccer.com

=== Top minutes played ===
No.	Nat.	Player	Pos.	MLS	Canadian Champ	TOTAL
8	(Algeria)	Saphir Taïder	MF	2728	305	3033
37	(Argentina)	Maximiliano Urruti	FW	2436	481	2917
1	(United States)	Evan Bush	GK	2880		2880
33	(France)	Bacary Sagna	DF	2180	450	2630
3	(United States)	Daniel Lovitz	DF	2520	181	2601
6	(Canada)	Samuel Piette	MF	2220	355	2575
22	(Finland)	Jukka Raitala	DF	2083	369	2452
5	(France)	Zakaria Diallo	DF	2037	180	2217
28	(Canada)	Shamit Shome	MF	1627	329	1956
4	(France)	Rudy Camacho	DF	1464	450	1914

Updated to match played October 6, 2019
Source: Montreal Impact
Italic: denotes player left the club during the season.

=== Yellow and red cards ===
No.	Player	Total			Major League Soccer			Canadian Championship			MLS Cup Playoffs			Ref.
No.	Player	Yellow card	(yellow card) (red card)	Red card	Yellow card	(yellow card) (red card)	Red card	Yellow card	(yellow card) (red card)	Red card	Yellow card	(yellow card) (red card)	Red card	Ref.
1	Evan Bush	3	0	0	3	0	0	0	0	0	0	0	0	
2	Víctor Cabrera	2	0	0	2	0	0	0	0	0	0	0	0	
3	Daniel Lovitz	5	0	0	5	0	0	0	0	0	0	0	0	
4	Rudy Camacho	4	0	0	4	0	0	0	0	0	0	0	0	
6	Samuel Piette	6	0	0	6	0	0	0	0	0	0	0	0	
8	Saphir Taïder	3	0	0	2	0	0	1	0	0	0	0	0	
9	Bojan Krkić	0	0	0	0	0	0	0	0	0	0	0	0	
10	Ignacio Piatti	1	0	0	1	0	0	0	0	0	0	0	0	
11	Anthony Jackson-Hamel	0	0	0	0	0	0	0	0	0	0	0	0	
13	Ken Krolicki	3	0	0	2	0	0	1	0	0	0	0	0	
14	Amar Sejdič	0	0	0	0	0	0	0	0	0	0	0	0	
15	Zachary Brault-Guillard	2	0	0	1	0	0	1	0	0	0	0	0	
16	Rod Fanni	0	0	0	0	0	0	0	0	0	0	0	0	
17	Ballou Tabla	0	0	0	0	0	0	0	0	0	0	0	0	
18	Orji Okwonkwo	5	0	0	4	0	0	1	0	0	0	0	0	
21	Lassi Lappalainen	0	0	0	0	0	0	0	0	0	0	0	0	
22	Jukka Raitala	1	0	0	1	0	0	0	0	0	0	0	0	
23	Clément Diop	0	0	0	0	0	0	0	0	0	0	0	0	
26	Jorge Corrales	1	0	0	0	0	0	1	0	0	0	0	0	
27	Clément Bayiha	0	0	0	0	0	0	0	0	0	0	0	0	
28	Shamit Shome	3	0	0	3	0	0	0	0	0	0	0	0	
29	Mathieu Choinière	1	0	0	1	0	0	0	0	0	0	0	0	
33	Bacary Sagna	7	0	1	7	0	1	0	0	0	0	0	0	
37	Maximiliano Urruti	5	0	1	5	0	1	0	0	0	0	0	0	
41	James Pantemis	0	0	0	0	0	0	0	0	0	0	0	0	
	Micheal Azira	3	0	0	3	0	0	0	0	0	0	0	0	
	Harry Novillo	1	0	0	1	0	0	0	0	0	0	0	0	
	Omar Browne	1	0	0	1	0	0	0	0	0	0	0	0	
	Zakaria Diallo	2	0	1	2	0	1	0	0	0	0	0	0	
Totals		59	0	3	54	0	3	5	0	0	0	0	0	
Last updated: October 6, 2019

== Recognition ==
=== MLS Player of the Week ===
Week	Player	Nation	Position	Report
9	Bush	United States	GK	MLS Player of the Week: 9
21	Lappalainen	Finland	FW	MLS Player of the Week: 21

=== MLS Goal of the Week ===
Week	Player	Nation	Position	Report
17	Okwonkwo	Nigeria	FW	MLS Player of the Week: 17

=== MLS Team of the Week ===
Week	Player	Nation	Position	Report
1	Diallo	France	DF	MLS Team of the Week: 1
1	Taïder	Algeria	MF	MLS Team of the Week: 1
3	Piatti	Argentina	MF	MLS Team of the Week: 3
7	Bush	United States	GK	MLS Team of the Week: 7
7	Piette	Canada	BN	MLS Team of the Week: 7
7	Garde	France	Coach	MLS Team of the Week: 7
9	Bush	United States	GK	MLS Team of the Week: 9
9	Diallo	France	BN	MLS Team of the Week: 9
9	Garde	France	Coach	MLS Team of the Week: 9
14	Browne	Panama	BN	MLS Team of the Week: 14
15	Taïder	Algeria	MF	MLS Team of the Week: 15
15	Bush	United States	BN	MLS Team of the Week: 15
17	Okwonkwo	Nigeria	BN	MLS Team of the Week: 17
21	Lappalainen	Finland	FW	MLS Team of the Week: 21
21	Brault-Guillard	Canada	DF	MLS Team of the Week: 21
21	Okwonkwo	Nigeria	BN	MLS Team of the Week: 21
24	Lappalainen	Finland	FW	MLS Team of the Week: 24
