= Maximiliano Urruti =

Argentine footballer (born 1991)

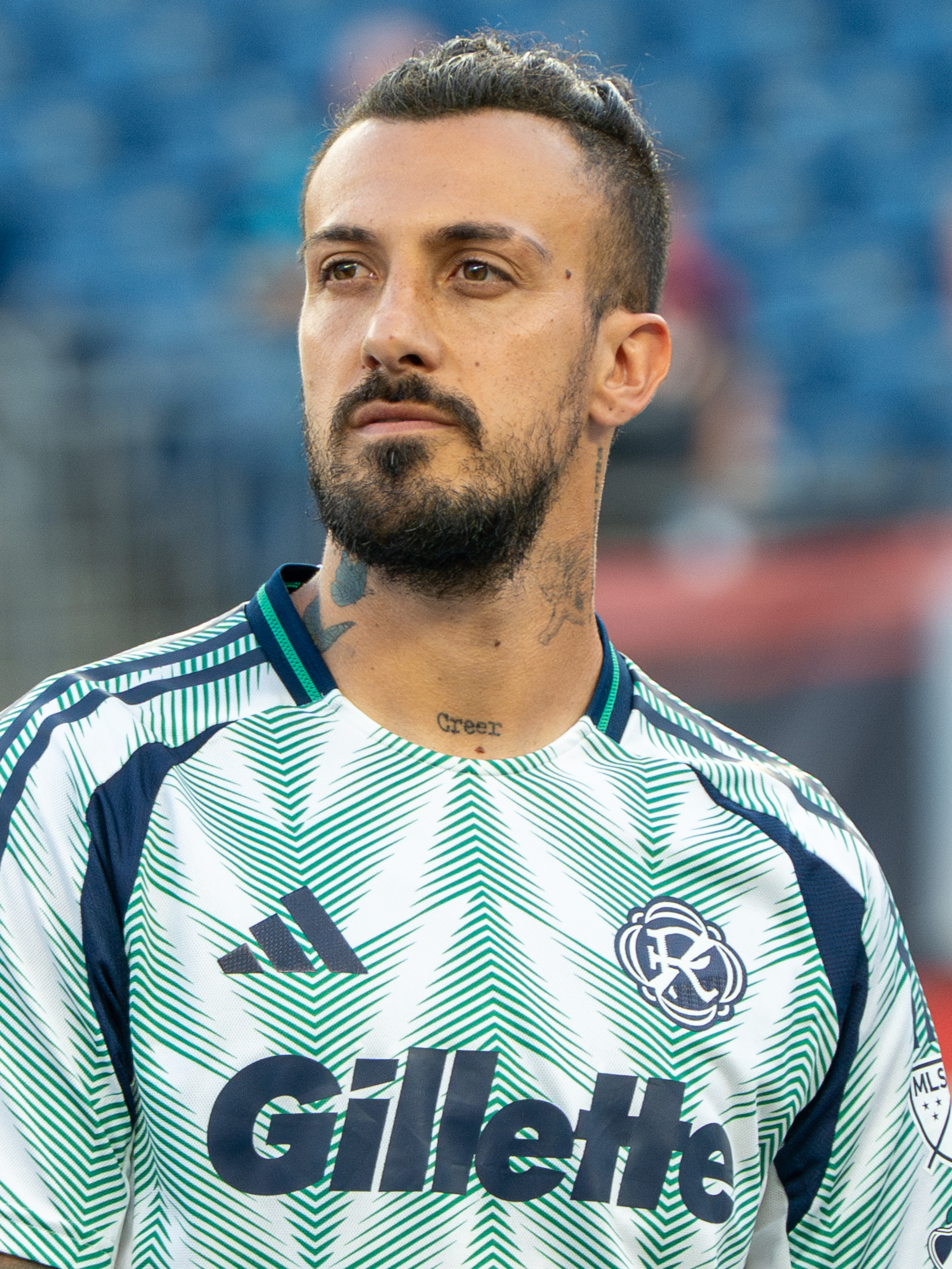
- Urruti with the New England Revolution in 2025

Personal information
- Full name: Maximiliano Nicolás Urruti Mussa
- Date of birth: 22 February 1991 (age 35)
- Place of birth: Rosario, Argentina
- Height: 6 ft 0 in (1.83 m)
- Position: Striker

Team information
- Current team: Calicut FC
- Number: 37

Youth career
- 2005–2011: Newell's Old Boys

Senior career*
Years	Team	Apps	(Gls)
2011–2013	Newell's Old Boys	57	(12)
2013	Toronto FC	2	(0)
2013–2015	Portland Timbers	65	(15)
2016−2018	FC Dallas	95	(29)
2019−2020	Montreal Impact	46	(9)
2021	Houston Dynamo	30	(7)
2022−2023	Austin FC	57	(10)
2024	Platense	7	(0)
2025	New England Revolution	20	(2)
2026−	Calicut FC	1	(1)
- * Club domestic league appearances and goals as of 26 September 2026

Maximiliano "Maxi" Nicolás Urruti Mussa (born 22 February 1991) is an Argentine professional footballer who plays as a striker for Super League Kerala club Calicut FC.

== Career ==
=== Newell's Old Boys ===
Urruti started his career in the youth system at Newell's Old Boys in Rosario, Argentina until he was promoted to the senior squad in 2011. On 14 May 2011 Urruti made his professional debut, getting the start in a 3–0 loss to Racing Club in a Primera División. He would make one additional appearance during his first season.

On 20 October 2011 Urruti scored his first goal for Newell's in a 2–2 draw with Club Olimpo. He ended the 2011 Apertura season with 1 goal from 7 appearances as Newell's finished 18th in the table. During the 2012 Clausura season, Urruti established himself in the first team. On 11 February 2012 Urruti scored once in a 1–1 draw against Estudiantes in the opening match of the Clausura. In their next game, he scored again to give Newell's a 1–0 win over Argentinos Juniors. On 8 April he scored in the 89th minute to draw 1–1 against Godoy Cruz. Urruti ended the 2012 Clausura season with 6 goals in 19 appearances, helping Newell's to a 6th-place finish.

Ahead of the 2012–13 season, former Newell's striker Ignacio Scocco returned to the club on loan. During the 2012 Torneo Inicial, Newell's finished 2nd in the league as Urruti made 14 appearances, however just one of them was a start as the return of Scocco reduced Urruti's playing time. On 2 March 2013, Urruti scored his first goal of the Torneo Final, and first of the 2012–13 season as a whole, in a 2–0 win against Belgrano. During the Torneo Final, Urruti scored 5 goals in 14 appearances to help Newell's finish top of the table and become 2013 Torneo Final champions. On 29 June, Newell's faced off with Torneo Inicial champions Vélez Sarsfield in the Superfinal. Urruti would appear off the bench, but Vélez Sarsfield would win 1–0 to become champions of the 2012–13 Primera División season. In Copa Libertadores play, Urruti made 6 appearances as Newell's reached the semifinals, where they lost 3–2 on penalties to the eventual champion, Atlético Mineiro. He also scored once from 2 appearances in the Copa Argentina during the season.

=== Toronto FC ===
On 16 August 2013, Urruti signed with MLS club Toronto FC. He made his debut for the club the next day in a 2–0 away defeat to Columbus Crew, when he was a second-half substitute for Robert Earnshaw.

=== Portland Timbers ===
On 9 September 2013, Urruti was traded to Portland Timbers along with an international roster spot for the remainder of the 2013 season in exchange for Bright Dike, a first-round 2015 MLS SuperDraft pick, and allocation money. Urruti made his debut for Portland on 14 September, coming on as a substitute in a 1–1 draw with Chivas USA. On 29 September, he scored his first Timbers goal in a 1–0 win over the LA Galaxy. Urruti ended the regular season with 1 goal from 5 appearances with Portland, helping the Timbers finish top of the Western Conference. He made 2 appearances in the playoffs as Portland reached the conference finals, where they lost to Real Salt Lake 5–2 on aggregate.

Urruti scored his first goal of the 2014 season on 5 April in a 4–4 draw against Cascadia Cup rivals Seattle Sounders FC. On 3 May, Urruti scored in the 94th minute to give Portland a 3–2 win over D.C. United. He scored a brace on 24 May to give the Timbers a 2–1 win over the Columbus Crew. Urruti ended the season with 10 goals and 2 assists in 30 MLS regular season appearances. However, the Timbers were unable to qualify for the playoffs, finishing 6th in the Western Conference, 1 point behind Vancouver Whitecaps FC in the final spot to qualify. During the group stage for the 2014–15 CONCACAF Champions League, Urruti made 4 appearances, scored 3 goals, and had 1 assists, but Portland did not advance out of the group.

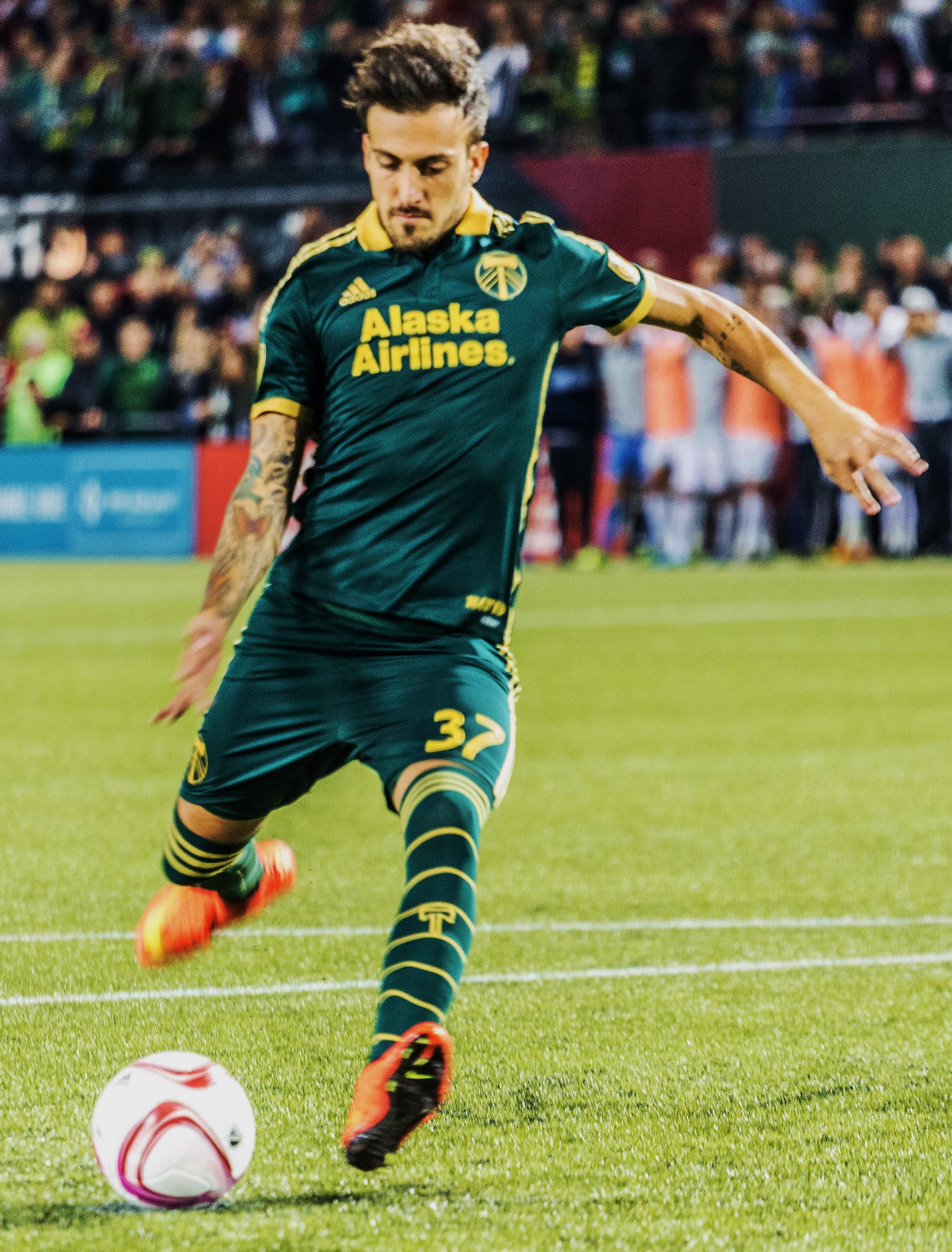
Urruti during the penalty shoot-out against Sporting Kansas City in the 2015 MLS Cup Playoffs.

On 4 April 2015, Urruti scored his first goal of the 2015 season to help the Timbers to a 3–1 victory against FC Dallas. He scored the only goal of the match on 27 May to give Portland a 1–0 win over D.C. United. On 16 June, Urruti scored in extra time to help the Timbers defeat their rivals Seattle 3–1 in a U.S. Open Cup match. He got the start in Portland's next cup match, a 2–0 loss to Real Salt Lake. On 18 October, Urruti had a goal and an assist as the Timbers beat the LA Galaxy 5–2. He ended the regular season with 4 goals and 3 assists from 30 appearances, helping Portland finish 3rd in the Western Conference. In the Timber's first game of the playoffs, Urruti came off the bench and scored in the 118th minute to level the score at 2–2 with Sporting Kansas City and send the game to a penalty shoot-out. Urruti converted his penalty kick to help Portland win the shoot-out 7–6. He would make a further 4 substitute appearances in the playoffs as the Timbers won MLS Cup 2015, defeating the Columbus Crew 2–1 in the final.

Following the 2015 season, Portland declined Urruti's 2016 contract option.

=== FC Dallas ===
On 11 December 2015, FC Dallas selected Urruti with the first pick of the 2015 MLS Re-Entry Draft. On 6 March 2016, Urruti made his debut for Dallas in the opening match of the 2016 season, scoring once in a 2–0 win against the Philadelphia Union. He scored his second goal for Dallas on 19 March in a 2–0 victory against the Montreal Impact. On 26 March, Urruti made it 3 goals in 4 games after scoring in a 3–0 win against D.C. United. On 8 July he scored once to give Dallas a 1–0 win over the San Jose Earthquakes. In Dallas's next match, Urruti scored again in a 3–1 victory against the Chicago Fire. On 31 July, Urruti scored for the 3rd straight MLS match to help Dallas beat Vancouver Whitecaps FC 2–0. He made it four consecutive MLS games with a goal on 13 August, scoring once in a 2–2 draw with Sporting Kansas City. Urruti ended the regular season with 30 appearances, 9 goals and 4 assists, helping Dallas win the Supporters' Shield for having the most points during the regular season. In Dallas playoff matchup with Seattle Sounders FC, Urruti started in both legs and scored in the second, but Dallas lost 4–2 on aggregate. Urruti also helped Dallas have a memorable run in the U.S. Open Cup during the 2016 Season. On 29 June he scored in extra time to give Dallas a 2–1 over the Colorado Rapids. On 13 September Urruti scored twice as Dallas beat the New England Revolution 4–2 in the final. Urruti also made one appearance in the group stage for the 2016–17 CONCACAF Champions League.

Dallas opened the 2017 MLS season on 4 March with a 2–1 win over the LA Galaxy, with Urruti scoring once in the match. On 18 March he scored twice to give Dallas a 2–1 victory against New England, a performance that saw him named MLS Player of the Week. On 6 May Urruti recorded another brace as Dallas beat Real Salt Lake 3–0. Between 17 June and 4 July, he scored in four straight games. Urruti finished the regular season with 12 goals and 5 assists from 32 appearances. Despite a productive season from Urruti, Dallas finished 7th in the Western Conference and missed out on the playoffs. Urruti also scored once and made 4 appearances in the knockout stage of the 2016–17 CONCACAF Champions League as Dallas reached the semifinal, where they lost 4–3 on aggregate to Pachuca.

Dallas and Urruti opened the 2018 season with 2018 CONCACAF Champions League play. Facing off with Tauro, Urruti started both legs and scored once, but Tauro advanced on away goals after a 3–3 aggregate score. On 18 March Urruti scored his first MLS goal of the season in a 3–0 win over Seattle. In March, he signed a new contract with Dallas. Between 5 and 25 May, Urruti scored in four consecutive games. He recorded a goal and an assist against San Jose on 29 August, but Dallas would lose the match 4–3. He ended the regular season with 33 appearances, 8 goals, and 11 assists, helping Dallas return to the playoffs after finishing 4th in the Western Conference. Urruti would start Dallas's first round matchup with the Portland Timbers, but Dallas would lose 2–1.

=== Montreal Impact ===
On 9 December 2018, Urruti was traded to the Montreal Impact in exchange for a first-round pick in the 2019 MLS SuperDraft and $75,000 in Targeted Allocation Money. Prior to the 2019 season, Urruti signed a new three-year contract with a team option for the 2022 season. Urruti made his Impact debut on 2 March 2019 in a 2–1 victory against the San Jose Earthquakes. On 16 March, he recorded his first assist since joining Montreal, helping the Impact to a 3–1 win over Orlando City SC. On 8 May, Urruti scored his first goal for Montreal and also added an assist to give the Impact a 2–1 win against the New York Red Bulls. He finished the regular season with 4 goals and 6 assists from 31 appearances. It was a disappointing MLS season for the Impact as a team, missing out on the playoffs after finishing 9th in the Eastern Conference. Montreal did enjoy a successful cup run during the season, with Urruti appearing in all 6 games as the Impact won the 2019 Canadian Championship, defeating Toronto FC in the final 3–1 on penalties after playing to a 1–1 aggregate score.

On 29 February 2020, Urruti scored in the 80th minute to give Montreal a 2–1 win against the New England Revolution in their first game of the MLS season. He scored twice on 6 March to give the Impact a 2–2 draw with FC Dallas. Following matchweek 2, the MLS season was paused for four months due to the COVID-19 pandemic. MLS returned to play in July with the MLS is Back Tournament, with games in the group stage counting as regular season matches. Urruti started all 3 group stage games to help Montreal advance to the knockout round. He came off the bench in their knockout round matchup with Orlando City, a 1–0 loss. On 17 October Urruti scored in the 80th minute to give the Impact a 2–1 victory against Inter Miami CF. Urruti ended the shortened season with 15 appearances (out of a possible 23), 5 goals, and 2 assists, helping the Impact qualify for the playoffs. He did not appear in Montreal's only playoff game, a 2–1 loss to New England. In November 2020, Urruti underwent knee surgery.

=== Houston Dynamo ===
On 18 January 2021 Urruti was traded to the Houston Dynamo along with a 2021 international roster slot in exchange for Aljaž Struna and Montreal's 2nd-round pick in the 2022 MLS SuperDraft. He made his Dynamo debut on 16 April, scoring once to give Houston a 2–1 win over the San Jose Earthquakes in the opening match of the season. Urruti started the season in good form, scoring 6 goals in the first 11 games. He then only scored once over his final 19 appearances. His final goal of the season, coming on 16 October in a 2–1 win over the Seattle Sounders, was his first goal in over 3 months. Urruti ended the season with 7 goals and 4 assists in 30 appearances as the Dynamo finished bottom of the Western Conference, failing to qualify for the playoffs. His contract option was declined following the season.

=== Austin FC ===
On 28 December 2021 Urruti signed with Austin FC on a two-year contract with an additional one-year option. On 17 November 2023, Austin FC announced they would not exercise the 2024 option for Urruti.

=== New England Revolution ===
On 16 January 2025 Urruti signed with the Revolution as free agent to a one-year contract through the 2025 Major League Soccer season, with a one-year club option for 2026. He made his Revolution debut in the 2025 season home-opener on 1 March 2025; coming on as an 82nd-minute substitute for Jackson Yueill in a 1–0 loss to the Columbus Crew. Urruti was waived by New England on 14 August 2025.

== Personal life ==
Urruti holds a U.S. green card which qualifies him as a domestic player for MLS roster purposes.

Urruti is the son of Juan José Urruti and Claudia Mussa. He has one sister named Lorena. Juan José Urruti was a footballer who earned one cap for the Argentina national team and played professionally in Argentina, Spain, Bolivia, and Chile. Maxi Urruti and his wife Ivon have a son together.

== Career statistics ==
As of match played 24 September 2023

Appearances and goals by club, season and competition
Club	Season	League			League cup (Note: Includes MLS Cup Playoffs and Copa de la Liga Profesional)		National cup (Note: Includes Copa Argentina, Canadian Championship and U.S. Open Cup)		Continental		Other		Total	
Club	Season	Division	Apps	Goals	Apps	Goals	Apps	Goals	Apps	Goals	Apps	Goals	Apps	Goals
Newell's Old Boys	2010–11	Argentine Primera División	2	0	—		—		—		—		2	0
Newell's Old Boys	2011–12	Argentine Primera División	26	7	—		0	0	—		—		26	7
Newell's Old Boys	2012–13	Argentine Primera División	29	5	—		2	1	6 (Note: Appearances in Copa Libertadores)	0	—		37	6
Newell's Old Boys	Total		57	12	0	0	2	1	6	0	0	0	65	13
Toronto FC	2013	MLS	2	0	—		0	0	—		—		2	0
Portland Timbers	2013	MLS	5	1	2	0	—		—		—		7	1
Portland Timbers	2014	MLS	30	10	—		2	0	4 (Note: Appearance(s) in CONCACAF Champions League)	3	—		36	13
Portland Timbers	2015	MLS	30	4	5	1	2	1	—		—		37	6
Portland Timbers	Total		65	15	7	1	4	1	4	3	0	0	80	20
FC Dallas	2016	MLS	30	9	2	1	5	3	1	0	—		38	13
FC Dallas	2017	MLS	32	12	—		1	0	4	1	—		37	13
FC Dallas	2018	MLS	33	8	1	0	1	0	2	1	—		37	9
FC Dallas	Total		95	29	3	1	7	3	7	2	0	0	112	35
Montreal Impact	2019	MLS	31	4	—		6	0	—		—		37	4
Montreal Impact	2020	MLS	15	5	—		0	0	2	0	1 (Note: Appearance in MLS is Back Tournament knockout stage)	0	18	5
Montreal Impact	Total		46	9	0	0	6	0	2	0	1	0	55	9
Houston Dynamo	2021	MLS	30	7	—		—		—		—		30	7
Austin FC	2022	MLS	32	9	3	0	1	0	—		—		36	9
Austin FC	2023	MLS	25	1	0	0	1	1	1	0	1 (Note: Appearance in Leagues Cup)	0	28	2
Austin FC	Total		57	10	3	0	2	1	1	0	1	0	64	11
Platense	2024	Argentine Primera División	0	0	4	0	1	0	—		—		5	0
Career total			352	82	17	2	22	6	20	5	2	0	413	95

== Honours ==
Newell's Old Boys

- Primera División: 2013 Final

Portland Timbers

- MLS Cup: 2015

FC Dallas

- U.S. Open Cup: 2016
- Supporters' Shield: 2016

Montreal Impact

- Canadian Championship: 2019
