= Daniel Kinumbe =

Canadian soccer player (born 1999)

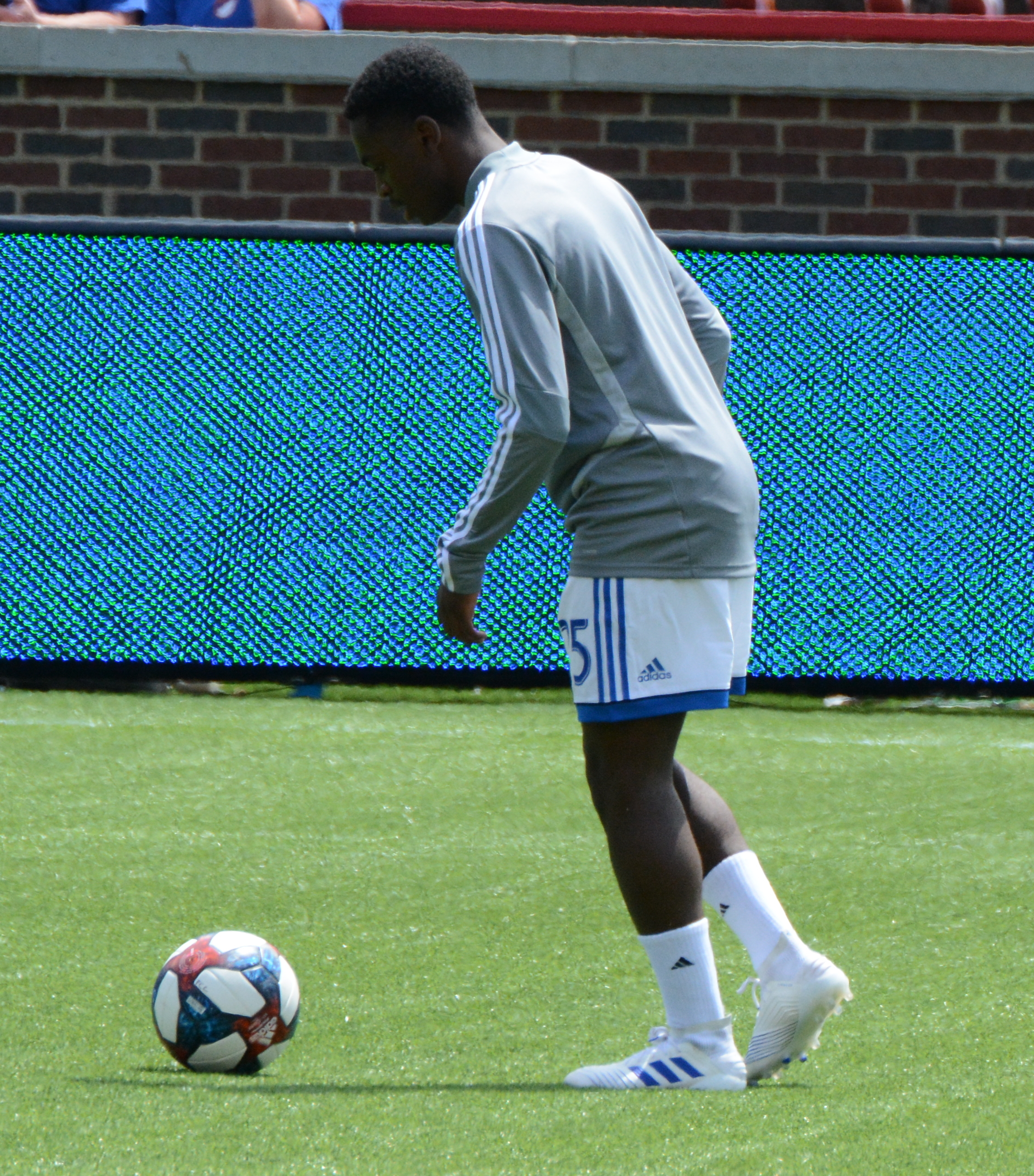
- Kinumbe in 2019 with Montreal Impact

Personal information
- Full name: Daniel Kinumbe
- Date of birth: March 15, 1999 (age 27)
- Place of birth: Tel Aviv, Israel
- Height: 1.73 m (5 ft 8 in)
- Position: Left-back

Team information
- Current team: HFX Wanderers
- Number: 13

Youth career
- CS Sherbrooke
- Panellinios
- 2016–2018: Montreal Impact

Senior career*
Years	Team	Apps	(Gls)
2018–2019	Montreal Impact	1	(0)
2018–2019	→ Ottawa Fury (loan)	3	(0)
2020	HFX Wanderers	4	(0)

International career^{‡}
2018	Canada U20	3	(0)
2018	Canada U21	4	(0)
- * Club domestic league appearances and goals as of September 15, 2020 ‡ National team caps and goals as of November 10, 2018

Daniel Kinumbe (born March 15, 1999) is a Canadian professional soccer player who plays as a left-back for HFX Wanderers.

== Early life ==
Kinumbe was born in Tel Aviv to parents from Republic of the Congo but moved with his family at a young age to Sherbrooke, Quebec in Canada.

== Club career ==
=== Montreal Impact ===
Kinumbe signed with Montreal Impact affiliate Ottawa Fury on August 6, 2018. He made his professional debut four days later against Nashville SC in a 2–0 defeat for the Fury. After the 2018 season, the Fury would announce that Kinumbe would not return to the team for the 2019 season.

On November 16, 2018, Kinumbe sign a home grown contract with the Montreal Impact.

On February 13, 2019, Ottawa Fury FC announced that Kinumbe would be returning on loan for the 2019 season. Kinumbe would have his option for the 2020 season declined by the Impact, ending his time with the club after two seasons.

=== HFX Wanderers ===
On January 15, 2020, Kinumbe signed a multi-year deal with Canadian Premier League side HFX Wanderers.

== International career ==
Born in Israel and raised in Canada, Kinumbe is of Congolese descent and was called to a DR Congo U-20 football camp in March 2018.

In 2017, he was called up to a Quebec-Canada U20 team to play friendlies against Haiti U20, who were preparing for the 2017 Jeux de la Francophonie.

In May 2018 Kinumbe was called up to the Canadian under-21 team for the 2018 Toulon Tournament. He played in all four of Canada's matches at the event. On October 24, 2018, Kinumbe was named to the Canadian U20 squad for the 2018 CONCACAF U-20 Championship. Kinumbe was named to the Canadian U-23 provisional roster for the 2020 CONCACAF Men's Olympic Qualifying Championship on February 26, 2020.

== Honours ==
Montreal Impact

- Canadian Championship: 2019

HFX Wanderers

- Canadian Premier League
  - Runners-up: 2020

== Career statistics ==
As of match played July 10, 2019

Club	League	Season	League		Playoffs		Domestic Cup		Total	
Club	League	Season	Apps	Goals	Apps	Goals	Apps	Goals	Apps	Goals
Ottawa Fury	USL	2018	3	0	0	0	0	0	3	0
Montreal Impact	MLS	2019	1	0	0	0	1	0	2	0
Career total			4	0	0	0	1	0	5	0
