= Zachary Brault-Guillard =

Canadian soccer player (born 1998)

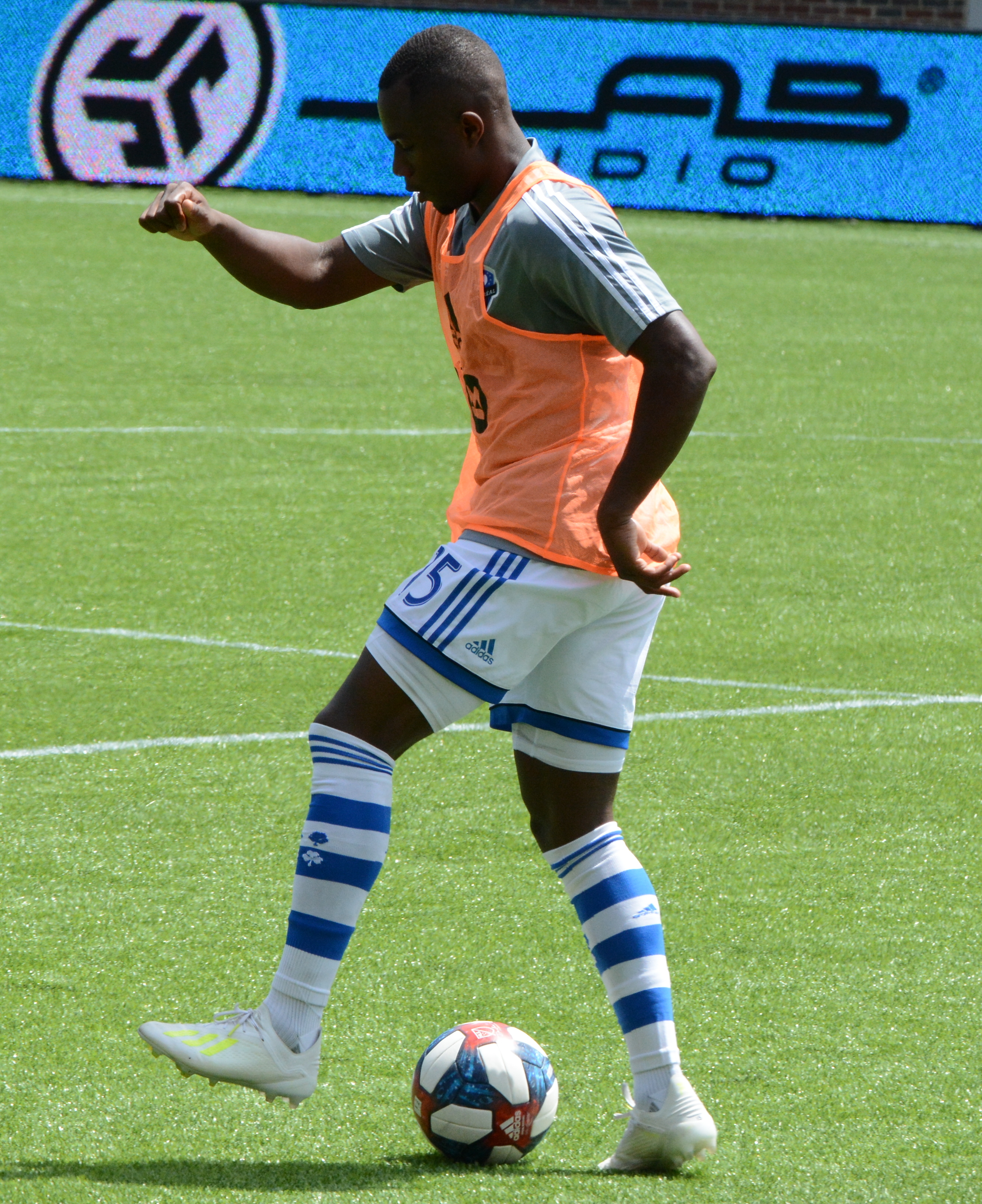
- Brault-Guillard with CF Montréal in 2019

Personal information
- Full name: Zachary Bichotte Paul Brault-Guillard
- Date of birth: December 30, 1998 (age 27)
- Place of birth: Delmas, Haiti
- Height: 1.71 m (5 ft 7 in)
- Position: Right-back

Youth career
- Lagnieu
- –2011: Ain Sud Foot
- 2011–2017: Lyon

Senior career*
Years	Team	Apps	(Gls)
2016–2019	Lyon II	33	(1)
2018–2020	Lyon	0	(0)
2019	→ Montreal Impact (loan)	13	(0)
2020–2023	CF Montréal (Note: Montreal Impact changed its name to CF Montréal in 2021)	93	(6)
2024–2026	Lugano	38	(0)
2026–	Supra du Québec	8	(0)

International career^{‡}
2017	Canada U20	3	(0)
2021	Canada U23	4	(0)
2018–	Canada	8	(1)
- * Club domestic league appearances and goals as of October 26, 2026 ‡ National team caps and goals as of July 10, 2024

Zachary Bichotte Paul Brault-Guillard (born December 30, 1998) is a professional soccer player who plays as a right-back for Canadian Premier Legaue club FC Supra du Québec. Born in Haiti, he plays for the Canada national team.

== Early life ==
Brault-Guillard was born in Haiti and raised in Montreal after being adopted by a Quebecois and French couple. Brault-Guillard was raised in Montreal until the age of seven before relocating to France. As a youth, he spent time with Lagnieu and Ain Sud, in the Auvergne-Rhône-Alpes region, before entering the Olympique Lyonnais academy with the under-13 team.

== Club career ==
=== CF Montréal ===
In February 2019, Brault-Guillard joined the Montreal Impact on loan from Olympique Lyonnais. He made his debut on March 2 in Montreal's season opener against the San Jose Earthquakes, as a substitute for Ignacio Piatti in the 85th minute.

Brault-Guillard transferred to Montreal permanently on January 25, 2020. Upon completion of the 2021 MLS season, CF Montréal would announce that they would exercise the option on Brault-Guillard's contract for 2022. Upon completion of the 2023 Season, CF Montréal would announce that they would not pick up Brault-Guillard's contract for 2024, ending his time with the club.

=== FC Supra du Québec ===
On September 6, 2026, FC Supra du Québec announced the signing of Brault-Guillard through the end of the 2026 season.

== International career ==
=== Youth ===
Brault-Guillard was named to the Canadian U-23 provisional roster for the 2020 CONCACAF Men's Olympic Qualifying Championship on February 26, 2020. He was named to the final squad ahead of the rescheduled tournament on March 10, 2021.

=== Senior ===
Brault-Guillard made his international debut for Canada on October 16, 2018, coming on as a substitute in the 66th minute for Liam Millar in the 2019–20 CONCACAF Nations League qualifying match against Dominica. The match finished as a 5–0 home win for Canada. He was named to the final 23-man squad for the 2019 CONCACAF Gold Cup on May 30, 2019.

On June 2, 2021, Brault-Guillard scored his first goal for Canada, netting the fourth goal in a 7–0 victory over Aruba in a World Cup qualifying match.

In June 2023, Brault-Guillard was named to the final 23-man squad for the 2023 CONCACAF Gold Cup.

== Career statistics ==
=== Club ===
As of match played August 6, 2026

Appearances and goals by club, season and competition
Club	Season	League			Playoffs		National cup		Continental		Other		Total	
Club	Season	Division	Apps	Goals	Apps	Goals	Apps	Goals	Apps	Goals	Apps	Goals	Apps	Goals
Lyon II	2015–16	CFA	2	0	—		—		—		—		2	0
Lyon II	2016–17	CFA	2	0	—		—		—		—		2	0
Lyon II	2017–18	National 2	15	0	—		—		—		—		15	0
Lyon II	2018–19	National 2	14	1	—		—		—		—		14	1
Lyon II	Total		33	1	0	0	0	0	0	0	0	0	33	1
Montreal Impact (loan)	2019	MLS	13	0	—		2	0	—		—		15	0
CF Montréal	2020	MLS	21	0	1	0	—		4	0	1 (Note: Appearance in MLS is Back Tournament knockout stage)	0	27	0
CF Montréal	2021	MLS	30	2	—		3	0	—		—		33	2
CF Montréal	2022	MLS	18	3	1	0	2	0	4	0	—		25	3
CF Montréal	2023	MLS	24	1	0	0	4	1	—		1 (Note: Appearance in Leagues Cup)	0	29	2
CF Montréal	Total		106	6	2	0	11	1	8	0	2	0	129	7
Lugano	2024–25	Swiss Super League	20	0	—		2	0	4	0	—		26	0
Lugano	2025–26	Swiss Super League	18	0	—		2	0	1	0	—		21	0
Lugano	Total		38	0	0	0	4	0	5	0	0	0	47	0
Career total			177	7	2	0	15	1	15	0	0	0	209	8

=== International ===
As of match played June 10, 2024

Appearances and goals by national team and year
National team	Year	Apps	Goals
Canada	2018	2	0
Canada	2019	2	0
Canada	2021	1	1
Canada	2022	2	0
Canada	2023	1	0
Total		8	1

Scores and results list Canada's goal tally first.

List of international goals scored by Zachary Brault-Guillard
No.	Date	Venue	Cap	Opponent	Score	Result	Competition
1	June 5, 2021	IMG Academy, Bradenton, United States	5	Aruba	4–0	7–0	2022 FIFA World Cup qualification

== Honours ==
CF Montreal

- Canadian Championship: 2019, 2021

Individual

- Canadian Championship Best Young Canadian Player Award: 2019
