= Daniel Lovitz =

American soccer player (born 1991)

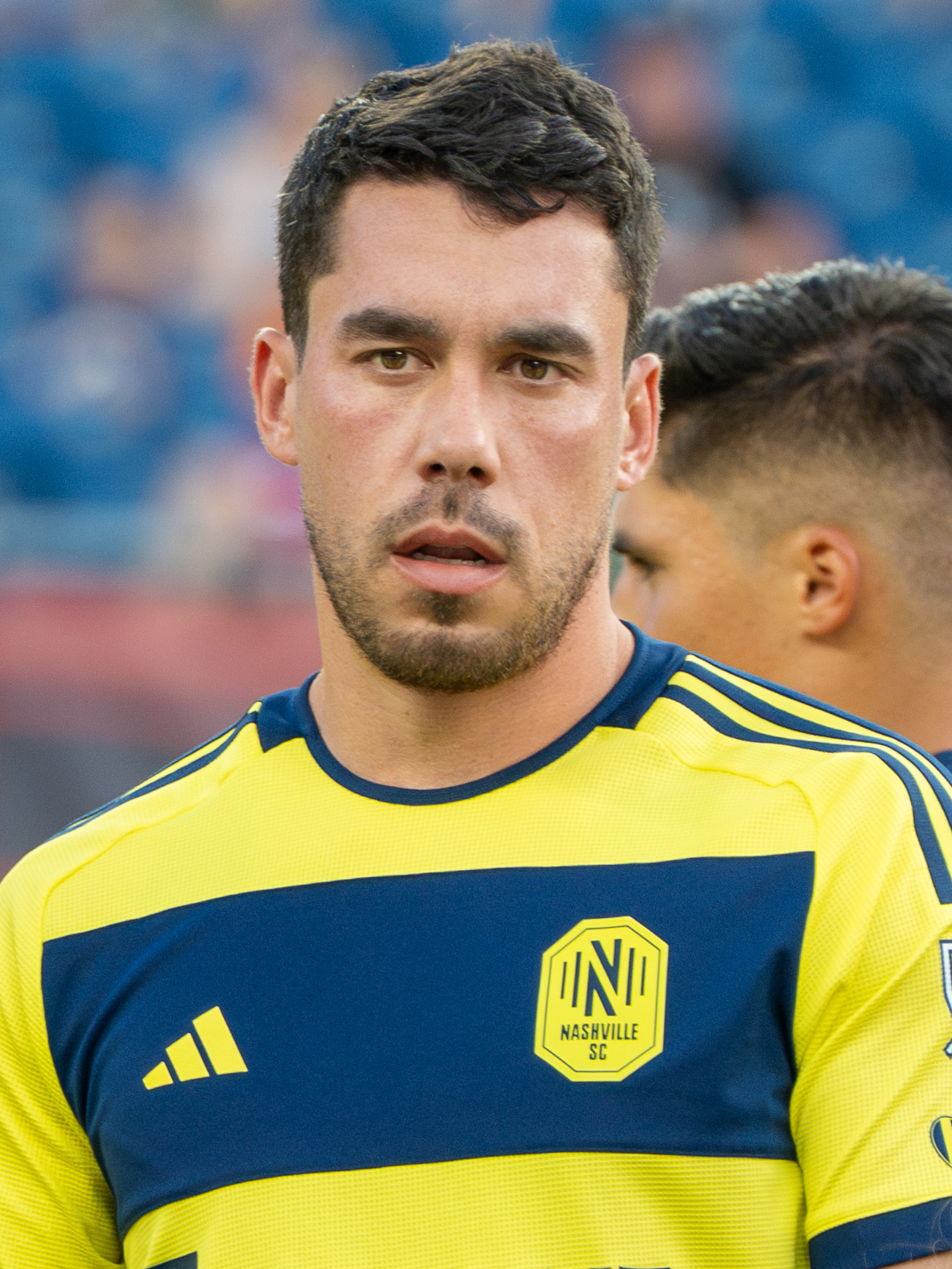
- Lovitz with Nashville SC in 2025

Personal information
- Full name: Daniel Harry Lovitz
- Date of birth: August 27, 1991 (age 35)
- Place of birth: Wyndmoor, Pennsylvania, U.S.
- Height: 5 ft 10 in (1.78 m)
- Position: Defender

Team information
- Current team: Nashville SC
- Number: 2

College career
Years	Team	Apps	(Gls)
2010–2013	Elon Phoenix	80	(9)

Senior career*
Years	Team	Apps	(Gls)
2012–2013	Carolina Dynamo	16	(1)
2014–2016	Toronto FC	41	(0)
2014	→ Wilmington Hammerheads (loan)	5	(1)
2016	→ Toronto FC II (loan)	2	(0)
2017–2019	Montreal Impact	84	(1)
2020–	Nashville SC	143	(2)

International career^{‡}
2019	United States	13	(0)
Medal record
Representing United States
Runner-up	CONCACAF Gold Cup	2019
- * Club domestic league appearances and goals as of March 16, 2025 ‡ National team caps and goals as of November 19, 2019

Daniel Harry Lovitz (born August 27, 1991) is an American professional soccer player who plays as a defender for Major League Soccer club Nashville SC.

== Club career ==
=== Early career ===
Lovitz grew up playing youth soccer in Eastern Pennsylvania for Lower Merion Soccer Club Velez. He played high school soccer for Germantown Academy followed by four years of college soccer at Elon University, making 80 appearances, scoring nine goals, and adding 16 assists.

In 2010, Lovitz was named to the Southern Conference all-freshman team. Lovitz was named to the 2012 SoCon all-tournament team. In 2013, Lovitz was named the Southern Conference Player of the Year after leading the Phoenix to a third straight conference tournament title and NCAA Tournament berth.

While at college, Lovitz also appeared for the USL PDL club Carolina Dynamo during their 2012 and 2013 season's.

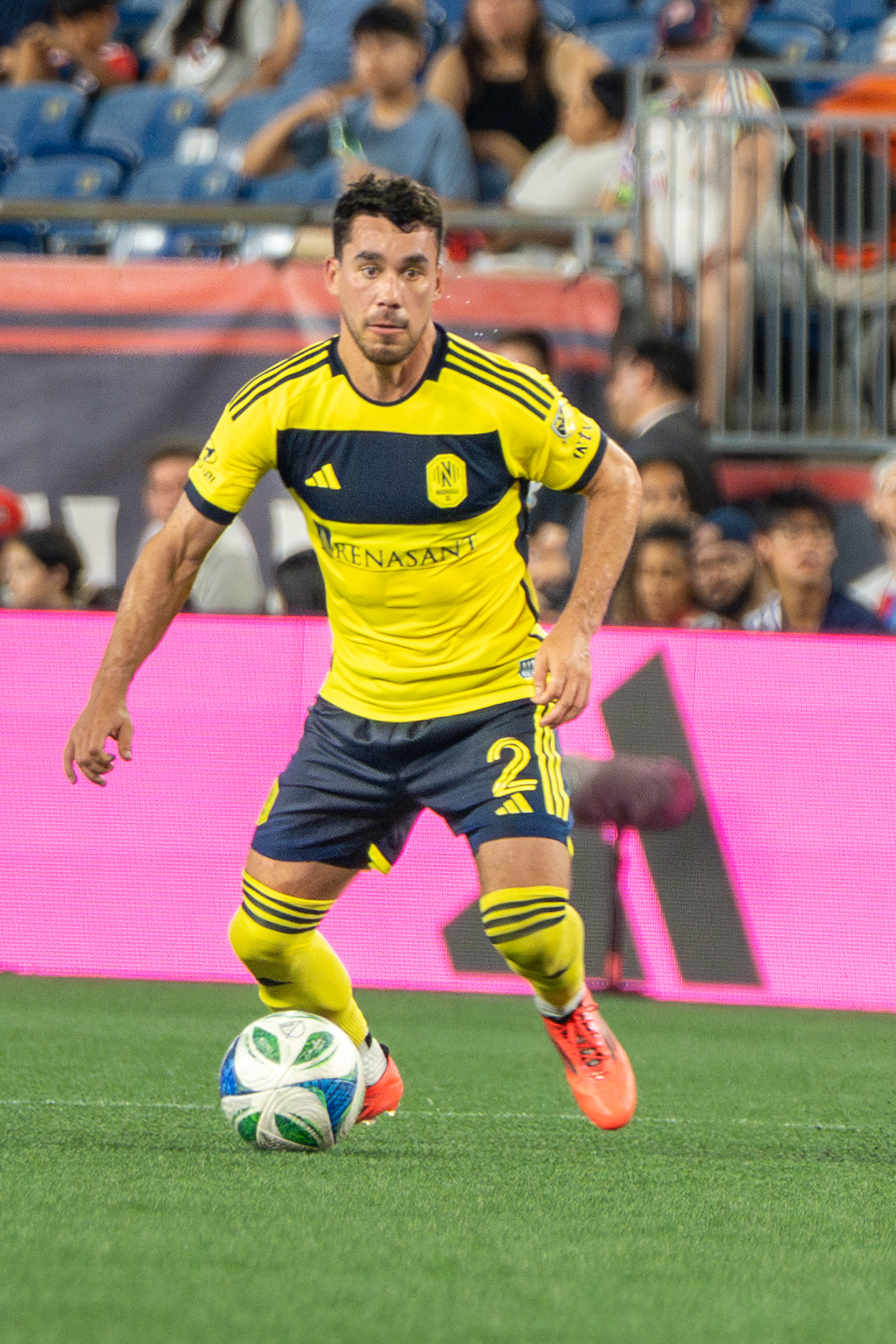
Daniel Lovitz during NE Revolution vs Nashville SC on 6.25.25

=== Toronto FC ===
On January 16, 2014, Lovitz was drafted in the second round (24th overall) of the 2014 MLS SuperDraft by Toronto FC. He was loaned to Toronto's USL Pro affiliate Wilmington Hammerheads in March 2014 along with Quillan Roberts and Manny Aparicio. Lovitz made his professional debut in a 0–0 draw with the Harrisburg City Islanders on April 5, 2014. The following week Lovitz scored his first goal against the Pittsburgh Riverhounds in a 4–3 away victory. On December 12, Lovitz was selected by New York City FC in the 2014 MLS Expansion Draft. However, hours later Toronto announced that they had re-acquired Lovitz from New York in exchange for allocation money. In 2015, Lovitz made 11 appearances, starting three for Toronto FC.

=== Montreal Impact ===
On February 28, 2017, Daniel Lovitz signed with the Montreal Impact.

=== Nashville SC ===
On November 19, 2019, Lovitz was traded to Nashville SC in exchange for $50,000 in General Allocation Money and $50,000 in Targeted Allocation Money.

== International career ==
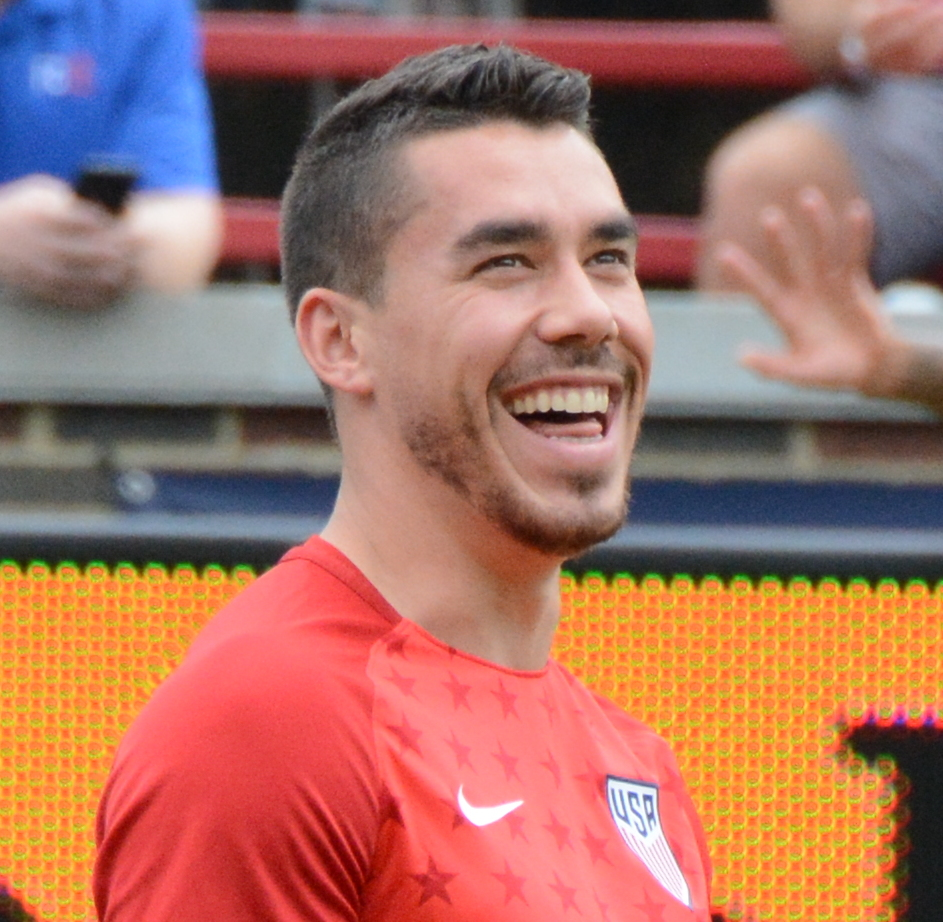
Lovitz with the United States in 2019

He made his debut for the United States national team on January 27, 2019, in a friendly against Panama as a starter. He was also named to the 2019 Gold Cup squad and continued to feature as a left back for the United States national team throughout 2019. Despite this, Lovitz has received criticism for his performance for the national team, referring to his talent and technical ability to play at the international level.

All 13 of his national team appearances came in 2019.

Also in 2019, Lovitz received interest from several teams in the Israeli Premier League, where he would be considered a domestic player due to his Jewish heritage.

== Career statistics ==
=== Club ===
As of match played February 25, 2023

Appearances and goals by club, season and competition
Club	Season	League			National cup		Other		Total	
Club	Season	Division	Apps	Goals	Apps	Goals	Apps	Goals	Apps	Goals
Toronto FC	2014	MLS	18	0	3	0	—		21	0
Toronto FC	2015	MLS	11	0	1	0	0	0	12	0
Toronto FC	2016	MLS	12	0	2	0	0	0	14	0
Toronto FC	Totals		41	0	5	0	0	0	46	0
Wilmington Hammerheads (loan)	2014	USL	5	1	0	0	—		5	1
Toronto FC II (loan)	2016	USL	2	0	—		—		2	0
Montreal Impact	2017	MLS	25	0	3	0	—		28	0
Montreal Impact	2018	MLS	31	1	2	0	—		33	1
Montreal Impact	2019	MLS	28	0	2	0	—		30	0
Montreal Impact	Totals		84	1	7	0	0	0	91	1
Nashville SC	2020	MLS	21	1	0	0	3 (Note: Appearance(s) in MLS Cup Playoffs)	0	24	1
Nashville SC	2021	MLS	27	0	0	0	2	0	29	0
Nashville SC	2022	MLS	31	1	3	0	1	0	35	1
Nashville SC	2023	MLS	1	0	0	0	0	0	1	0
Nashville SC	Totals		80	2	3	0	6	0	89	2
Career totals			212	4	15	0	6	0	233	4

=== International ===
As of November 19, 2019

Appearances and goals by national team and year
National team	Year	Apps	Goals
United States	2019	13	0
Total		13	0

Source: US Soccer

== Honors ==
Montreal Impact

- Canadian Championship: 2019

Nashville SC

- U.S. Open Cup: 2025
