= Zakaria Diallo =

French-Senegalese footballer (born 1986)

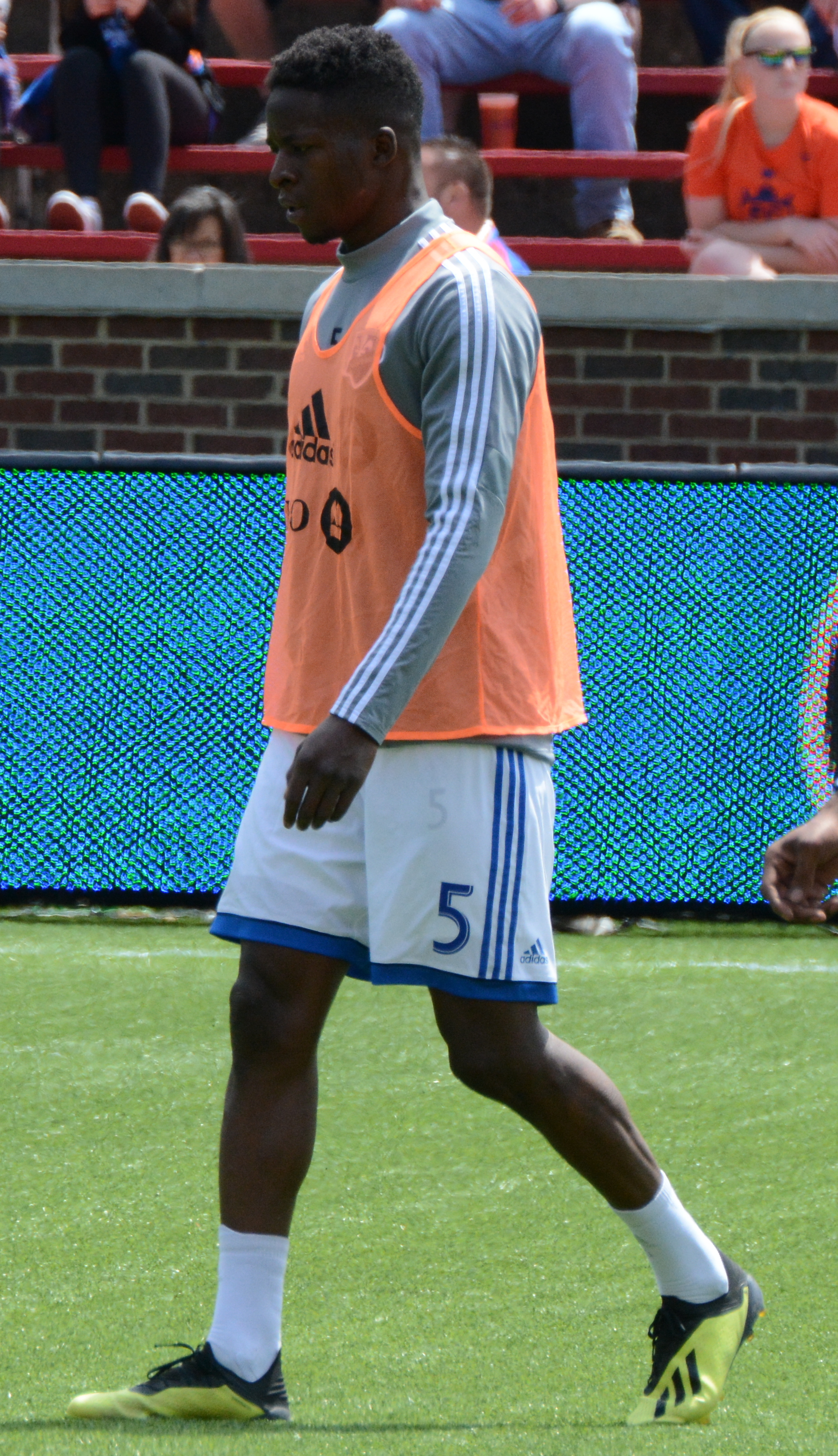
- Diallo with Montreal Impact in 2019

Personal information
- Date of birth: 13 August 1986 (age 40)
- Place of birth: Équemauville, France
- Height: 1.94 m (6 ft 4 in)
- Position: Centre-back

Youth career
- 1992–1999: CS Honfleur
- 1999-2004: CA Lisieux
- 2004–2007: Le Havre AC
- 2007-2009: AS Treauville-Deauville

Senior career*
Years	Team	Apps	(Gls)
2009–2010	Beauvais	22	(1)
2010–2011	Sporting Charleroi	6	(0)
2011–2015	Dijon	64	(5)
2015–2016	Ajaccio	37	(0)
2016–2018	Brest	37	(3)
2018–2019	Montreal Impact	24	(3)
2019–2021	Lens	25	(0)
2021–2022	Al-Shabab	0	(0)
2022	NorthEast United	7	(0)
2022	Le Havre	4	(0)
- * Club domestic league appearances and goals as of 20:44, 1 November 2022 (UTC)

Zakaria Diallo (born 11 August 1986) is a French-Senegalese professional footballer who plays as a centre-back, who is currently a free agent.

== Career ==
=== Le Havre and Beauvais ===
Diallo started playing football for the reserve team of professional club Le Havre in the Championnat de France amateur, the fourth tier of French football. After spending just half a year at the side he moved on a free transfer to Championnat National side AS Beauvais Oise. With Beauvais, Diallo played 22 games and scored once to wrap up the 2009–10 Championnat National season.

=== Charleroi ===
At the start of the 2010–11 season, Diallo joined Belgian Pro League side Sporting Charleroi. The 2010–11 season marked the first year for Diallo in top-flight football. He made six appearances, while being subbed in a further five. At the end of the season, Charleroi finished 16th and were relegated to the Belgian Second Division.

=== Dijon ===
In July 2011, Diallo moved to Dijon FCO on a free transfer for the 2011–12 Ligue 1 season.

=== Ajaccio ===
In June 2015, Diallo signed with AC Ajaccio from Dijon.

=== Brest ===
In 2016, Diallo joined Stade Brestois 29 after a year at Ajaccio.

=== Montreal Impact ===
In January 2018, Diallo signed a two-year contract with the Montreal Impact.

=== Lens ===
On 14 August 2019, Diallo moved to French club RC Lens for a reported transfer fee of $150,000.

=== Al-Shabab ===
On 16 August 2021, Diallo moved to Kuwaiti club Al-Shabab for one season. He left the club in January 2022.

=== NorthEast United ===
On 13 January 2022, Diallo joined Indian Super League club NorthEast United.

=== Return to Le Havre ===
On 26 July 2022, Diallo returned to Le Havre on a one-year deal.

== Career statistics ==
As of 28 February 2022

Appearances and goals by club, season and competition
Club	Season	League			National cup		League cup		Other		Total	
Club	Season	Division	Apps	Goals	Apps	Goals	Apps	Goals	Apps	Goals	Apps	Goals
Beauvais	2009–10	National	22	1	5	0	0	0	—		27	1
Charleroi	2010–11	Belgian Pro League	6	0	0	0	0	0	—		6	0
Dijon	2011–12	Ligue 1	3	0	3	1	2	0	0	0	8	1
Dijon	2012–13	Ligue 2	11	3	0	0	0	0	0	0	11	3
Dijon	2013–14	Ligue 2	33	2	2	0	0	0	0	0	35	2
Dijon	2014–15	Ligue 2	17	0	3	1	0	0	0	0	20	1
Dijon	Total		64	5	8	2	2	0	0	0	74	7
Ajaccio	2015–16	Ligue 2	37	0	3	0	2	0	0	0	42	0
Ajaccio	2016–17	Ligue 2	0	0	0	0	0	0	0	0	0	0
Ajaccio	Total		37	0	3	0	2	0	0	0	42	0
Brest	2016–17	Ligue 2	35	3	1	0	2	0	0	0	38	3
Brest	2017–18	Ligue 2	2	0	0	0	0	0	0	0	2	0
Brest	Total		37	3	1	0	2	0	0	0	40	3
Montreal Impact	2018	MLS	0	0	0	0	—		0	0	0	0
Montreal Impact	2019	MLS	23	3	0	0	—		1	0	24	3
Montreal Impact	Total		24	3	0	0	0	0	1	0	25	3
Lens	2019–20	Ligue 2	25	0	1	0	0	0	0	0	26	0
Lens	2020–21	Ligue 1	0	0	0	0	—		0	0	0	0
Lens	Total		25	0	1	0	0	0	0	0	26	0
NorthEast United	2021–22	Indian Super League	7	0	—		—		—		7	0
Career total			222	12	18	2	6	0	1	0	247	14
