= Orji =

- Village
- Interactive map of Orji
- Coordinates: 5°31′39″N 7°3′50″E
- Country: Nigeria
- State: Imo State
- Local Government Area: Owerri North

Orji is a village in southeast Nigeria. It is located in the Owerri North Local Government Area of Imo State. This region is part of the ancient kingdom of Uratta. Orji is one of several settlements along the Owerri-Okigwe road, including Umuchoke, Umuogowerem, Umuogii, Umukehi, Umuodu, Umuimeka, Umundula, Umuasonye, and Aro.
