= Omar Browne =

Panamanian footballer (born 1994)

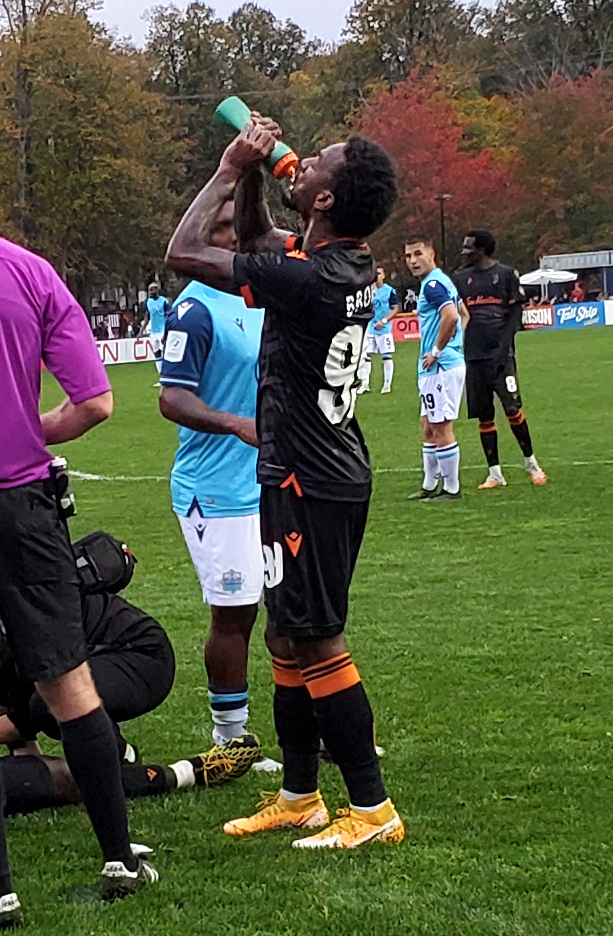
- Omar Browne with Forge FC in 2021

Personal information
- Full name: Omar Ezequiel Browne Zúñiga
- Date of birth: 3 May 1994 (age 32)
- Place of birth: Panama City, Panama
- Height: 1.75 m (5 ft 9 in)
- Positions: Forward; winger

Team information
- Current team: Estudiantes (on loan from Tauro)
- Number: 99

Senior career*
Years	Team	Apps	(Gls)
2012–2013	Plaza Amador	8	(0)
2013–2014	Sporting San Miguelito	14	(3)
2014–2015	Chorrillo	7	(0)
2015–2017	Plaza Amador	10	(1)
2018–2019	Independiente	60	(15)
2019	→ Montreal Impact (loan)	10	(2)
2020	San Carlos	8	(0)
2020	Hapoel Tel Aviv	1	(0)
2020–2022	Independiente	3	(1)
2021–2022	→ Forge FC (loan)	9	(2)
2022–	Tauro	64	(17)
2025–	→ Estudiantes (loan)	12	(3)

International career^{‡}
2018–	Panama	14	(0)
- * Club domestic league appearances and goals as of 18:39, 5 October 2025 (UTC) ‡ National team caps and goals as of 10 October 2025

Omar Ezequiel Browne Zúñiga (born 3 May 1994) is a Panamanian professional footballer who plays as a forward for Venezuelan Primera División club Estudiantes on loan from Tauro and the Panama national team.

== Club career ==
Browne has played for several Liga Panameña de Fútbol clubs including Plaza Amador, Sporting San Miguelito, Chorrillo, Independiente, and Tauro, as well as for Montreal Impact and Forge FC in Canada on loan.

=== Independiente ===
In February 2019, Browne scored two goals against Toronto FC in two games to help Independiente reach the 2019 CONCACAF Champions League quarter-finals.

=== Montreal Impact ===
After a successful showing in the Champions League, Browne was loaned to the Montreal Impact for the 2019 season with an option to buy. In his debut match with the club, Browne scored the winning goal in a 1–0 victory against the Chicago Fire on 28 April.

=== Forge FC ===
In June 2021, Browne was acquired on loan by Canadian Premier League side Forge FC. However, after being unable to join the club due to a visa issue and in August, re-joined Independiente for training. On 24 September he was finally cleared to join Forge. He made his debut on 25 September, scoring the winning goal in a substitute appearance in a 2–1 victory over Pacific FC. Three days later, he appeared in a 2021 CONCACAF League match against his parent club Independiente.

In January 2022, Forge announced that it had extended Browne's loan ahead of the club's debut in the CONCACAF Champions League. However, he ultimately never joined the team for its 2022 season.

=== Tauro F.C. ===
In November 2022, Browne joined Tauro F.C. for the club's Apertura 2023 campaign.

== International career ==
Browne made his first appearance for Panama in April 2018, against Trinidad and Tobago.

== Career statistics ==
=== International ===
As of match played 10 October 2025

Appearances and goals by national team and year
National team	Year	Apps	Goals
Panama	2018	2	0
Panama	2019	5	0
Panama	2020	3	0
Panama	2021	2	0
Panama	2023	1	0
Panama	2025	1	0
Total		14	0
