= Ignacio Piatti =

Argentine footballer (born 1985)

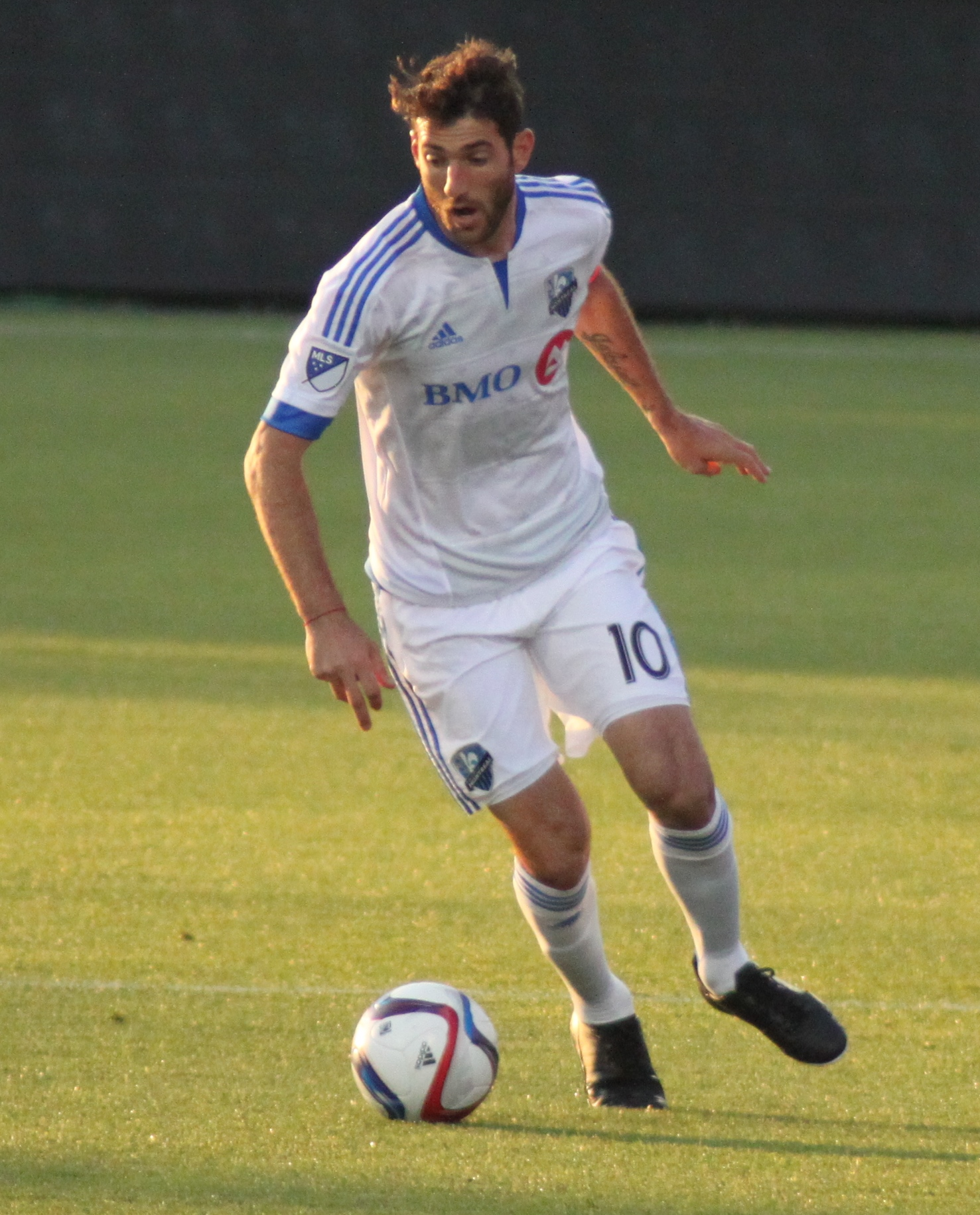
- Piatti playing for Montreal Impact in 2015

Personal information
- Full name: Ignacio Alberto Piatti
- Date of birth: 4 February 1985 (age 41)
- Place of birth: General Baldissera, Argentina
- Height: 1.81 m (5 ft 11 in)
- Position: Winger

Youth career
- 2000: Club Mitre de General Baldissera

Senior career*
Years	Team	Apps	(Gls)
2004–2006	Chacarita Juniors	50	(11)
2006	Saint-Étienne	4	(0)
2007–2009	Gimnasia LP	81	(10)
2009–2010	Independiente	35	(8)
2010–2012	Lecce	36	(3)
2012–2014	San Lorenzo	66	(19)
2014–2019	Montreal Impact	135	(66)
2020	San Lorenzo	9	(1)
2021	Racing Club	20	(2)
Total		436	(120)
- * Club domestic league appearances and goals

Ignacio Alberto Piatti (born 4 February 1985) is an Argentine former professional footballer who played as a winger.

== Club career ==
Piatti has played professional football in Europe with Saint-Étienne and Lecce. In his native Argentina, he has played for Chacarita Juniors, Gimnasia LP, and Independiente.

On 17 August 2012 Piatti signed for the Argentine club San Lorenzo de Almagro for a reported fee of €1 million. He debuted against Colon de Santa Fe in the sixth match of Torneo Inicial 2012, Ignacio was the player of the match.

On 2 July 2014, Piatti signed a transfer agreement with Canadian club Montreal Impact of Major League Soccer. However, he remained with San Lorenzo until the team completed their Copa Libertadores campaign. He reported to Montreal on 13 August 2014, and debuted for Montreal against the Chicago Fire on 16 August. When Piatti joined the Impact, he was an instantaneous success, scoring 4 goals in 6 games. He started all six games in the 2014–15 CONCACAF Champions League Championship Stage and helped the team reach the final, where they lost out against Mexican giants Club América, recording two goals and one assist in 526 minutes played. He also helped the team reach the Eastern Conference Final of the 2016 MLS Cup Playoffs. He and the club mutually agreed to terminate the contract on 10 February 2020, allowing him to sign a new contract with first division Argentine club San Lorenzo. At the time of his departure, Piatti was the all-time top goalscorer of the Montreal Impact, with 78 goals in all competitions, and the second all-time assist leader. Piatti also ranked first in Impact club history with 130 regular-season starts, 66 MLS goals, 11,427 minutes played, 35 assists, 15 penalty goals, 15 game-winning goals, 13 game-winning assists, and 14 multi-goal games. He also registered five goals and three assists in eight starts in the MLS Cup playoffs during his time with the club.

== Style of play ==
A dynamic attacker, Piatti is a technically skilled dribbler, who is capable of both creating and scoring goals, and is able to play in several midfield roles. Although he is capable of playing in the centre, behind another striker, he usually plays on the left-wing, which is his favorite position, as it enables him to cut into the centre and shoot on goal with his stronger right foot; regarding his preference for this position, he has stated, "I played on the left for a long time, in Argentina, for example...I’d rather play on the left. I’m comfortable there." Although he is usually deployed in midfield, Piatti has also been fielded in several more offensive roles, and has been used as a second striker, as a false-9, or even as an out-and-out striker on occasion.

== Personal life ==
Pedro, the grandfather and first coach of Piatti, died in March 2015. Piatti paid tribute to him by lifting his jersey to reveal the message ‘Abuelo te amo’, which translates to 'Grandfather, I love you', on a couple of occasions, most notably at Estadio Azteca after he scored the opener in the first leg of the CONCACAF Champions League Finals.

== Honours ==
San Lorenzo

- Argentine Primera División: 2013 Inicial
- Copa Libertadores: 2014

Montreal Impact

- CONCACAF Champions League runner up: 2014–15
- Canadian Championship: 2019

Individual

- MLS All-Star: 2016, 2017, 2018
- MLS Best XI: 2016, 2018
- Montreal Impact Most Valuable Player: 2015, 2016, 2017, 2018
- Montreal Impact Top Scorer: 2016, 2017, 2018
- Canadian Championship Top Scorer: 2019
- George Gross Memorial Trophy: 2019
