= 2019 Canadian Championship =

2019 professional soccer tournament

Championnat Canadien 2019

Tournament details
- Country: Canada
- Dates: May 15 – September 25
- Teams: 13 (from 5 leagues)

Final positions
- Champions: Montreal Impact (3rd title)
- Runners-up: Toronto FC

Tournament statistics
- Matches played: 24
- Goals scored: 55 (2.29 per match)
- Attendance: 156,268 (6,511 per match)
- Top goal scorer(s): Ignacio Piatti (4 goals)

Awards
- George Gross Memorial Trophy: Ignacio Piatti
- Best young player: Zachary Brault-Guillard

The 2019 Canadian Championship was the twelfth edition of the Canadian Championship, contested from May 15 to September 25, 2019. The Montreal Impact won their third Canadian Championship title (their tenth Voyageurs Cup dating back to their previous iteration) and earned a berth in the 2020 CONCACAF Champions League.

The competition expanded to thirteen teams with the introduction of the seven Canadian Premier League (CPL) clubs, the most in the competition's history. The 2019 tournament also marked the first time that clubs from Manitoba and Nova Scotia were represented in the Canadian Championship, and the return of clubs from Alberta after none participated in 2018.

Cavalry FC's 2–1 aggregate defeat of Vancouver Whitecaps FC in the tournament's third qualifying round marked the first time in the history of the Canadian Championship that an MLS team was defeated by a non-MLS team in a home-and-away series.

Ignacio Piatti was the tournament's top scorer with four goals and won the George Gross Memorial Trophy, while Zachary Brault-Guillard received the inaugural Best Young Canadian Player award for the best Canadian player of the tournament aged 21 or younger.

== Format ==
The format of the competition was changed to include the seven CPL clubs, and consisted of three qualifying rounds before semi-finals and a final. All rounds were played in a two-legged tie format. In the first qualifying round, the League1 Ontario champion Vaughan Azzurri, Première ligue de soccer du Québec champion AS Blainville, and four CPL clubs entered the competition. They were joined by the remaining three CPL clubs (given byes due to previously competing or being sanctioned earlier than the other clubs) in the second qualifying round. In the third qualifying round, Ottawa Fury FC and two Major League Soccer teams entered. The previous year's champion, Toronto FC, received a bye to the semi-finals.

=== Distribution ===
Distribution of teams for 2019 Canadian Championship
Round	Teams entering in this round	Teams advancing from previous round
First qualifying round (6 teams)	1 champion of League1 Ontario; 1 champion of Première ligue de soccer du Québec; 4 Canadian Premier League teams	
Second qualifying round (6 teams)	3 Canadian Premier League "inaugural teams"	3 winners from the first qualifying round
Third qualifying round (6 teams)	1 USL Championship team; 2 Major League Soccer teams	3 winners from the second qualifying round
Semi-finals (4 teams)	1 champion of 2018 Canadian Championship	3 winners from the third qualifying round
Final (2 teams)		2 winners from the semi-finals

== Teams ==
Montreal area clubs: AS Blainville; Montreal Impact
Toronto area clubs: Toronto FC; Vaughan Azzurri; York9 FC

Canadian Premier League Major League Soccer Other

Team	Location	League	Previous best	Prior appearances
AS Blainville	Blainville, Quebec	Première ligue de soccer du Québec	Second qualifying round: 1	1
Cavalry FC	Foothills County, Alberta	Canadian Premier League	N/A	Debut
FC Edmonton	Edmonton, Alberta	Canadian Premier League	Semi-finals: 5	7
Forge FC	Hamilton, Ontario	Canadian Premier League	N/A	Debut
HFX Wanderers FC	Halifax, Nova Scotia	Canadian Premier League	N/A	Debut
Montreal Impact	Montreal, Quebec	Major League Soccer	Champions: 3	11
Ottawa Fury FC	Ottawa, Ontario	USL Championship	Semi-finals: 3	5
Pacific FC	Langford, British Columbia	Canadian Premier League	N/A	Debut
Toronto FC	Toronto, Ontario	Major League Soccer	Champions: 7	11
Valour FC	Winnipeg, Manitoba	Canadian Premier League	N/A	Debut
Vancouver Whitecaps FC	Vancouver, British Columbia	Major League Soccer	Champions: 1	11
Vaughan Azzurri	Vaughan, Ontario	League1 Ontario	N/A	Debut
York9 FC	Toronto, Ontario	Canadian Premier League	N/A	Debut

Note

- Statistics include previous incarnations of FC Edmonton, Montreal Impact, and Vancouver Whitecaps

== Schedule ==
Round	First leg date	Second leg date	Teams entering
First qualifying round	May 15	May 22	6 (AS Blainville, Cavalry FC, HFX Wanderers FC, Pacific FC, Vaughan Azzurri, York9 FC)
Second qualifying round	June 4–5	June 11–12	3 (FC Edmonton, Forge FC, Valour FC)
Third qualifying round	July 10	July 24	3 (Montreal Impact, Ottawa Fury FC, Vancouver Whitecaps FC)
Semi-finals	August 7	August 14	1 (Toronto FC)
Final	September 18	September 25	—N/a

== Bracket ==
The draw was held on February 12, 2019.

First qualifying round May 15–22
PLSQ	AS Blainville	0	0	0
CPL	York9 FC	0	1	1
CPL	Pacific FC	0	1	1
CPL	Cavalry FC	2	2	4
L1O	Vaughan Azzurri	2	1	3
CPL	HFX Wanderers FC (a)	3	0	3

Second qualifying round June 4–12
CPL	FC Edmonton	1	1	2
CPL	York9 FC	3	0	3
CPL	Forge FC	1	1	2
CPL	Cavalry FC	1	2	3
CPL	Valour FC	1	0	1
CPL	HFX Wanderers FC	2	2	4

Third qualifying round July 10–24
MLS	Montreal Impact	2	1	3
CPL	York9 FC	2	0	2
MLS	Vancouver Whitecaps FC	0	1	1
CPL	Cavalry FC	0	2	2
USL	Ottawa Fury FC	3	2	5
CPL	HFX Wanderers FC	2	2	4

Semi-finals; August 7–14
MLS	Montreal Impact	2	1	3
CPL	Cavalry FC	1	0	1
MLS	Toronto FC	2	3	5
USL	Ottawa Fury FC	0	0	0

Final; September 18–25
MLS	Montreal Impact (p)	1	0	1 (3)
MLS	Toronto FC	0	1	1 (1)

== First qualifying round ==
=== Summary ===
The first legs were held on May 15, and the second legs on May 22, 2019.

Team 1	Agg.	Team 2	1st leg	2nd leg
Vaughan Azzurri	3–3 (a)	HFX Wanderers FC	2–3	1–0
Pacific FC	1–4 (Note: Order of legs reversed after original draw.)	Cavalry FC	0–2	1–2
AS Blainville	0–1	York9 FC	0–0	0–1

=== Matches ===
May 15
7:00 pm EDT

Vaughan Azzurri	2–3	HFX Wanderers FC
Whiteman 51'; Raposo 60'	Report	Skublak 2'; García 39'; Kourouma 90+3' (pen.)

Ontario Soccer Centre, Vaughan, Ontario
Attendance: 1,200
Referee: Serge Topalian
May 22
6:00 pm ADT

HFX Wanderers FC	0–1	Vaughan Azzurri
	Report	Schaale 27' (o.g.)

Wanderers Grounds, Halifax, Nova Scotia
Attendance: 5,532
Referee: Silviu Petrescu

3–3 on aggregate. HFX Wanderers FC won on away goals.

May 15
7:30 pm PDT

Pacific FC	0–2	Cavalry FC
	Report	Zator 9'; Oliver 16'

Westhills Stadium, Langford, British Columbia
Attendance: 2,294
Referee: Yusri Rudolf
May 22
7:30 pm MDT

Cavalry FC	2–1	Pacific FC
Haber 2' (o.g.); Büscher 67'	Report	Haber 73'

ATCO Field, Foothills County, Alberta
Attendance: 3,000
Referee: Juan Marquez

Cavalry FC won 4–1 on aggregate.

May 15
7:00 pm EDT

AS Blainville	0–0	York9 FC
	Report

Blainville Equestrian Park, Blainville, Quebec
Attendance: 1,503
Referee: Filip Dujic
May 22
7:00 pm EDT

York9 FC	1–0	AS Blainville
Telfer 70'	Report

York Lions Stadium, Toronto, Ontario
Attendance: 1,723
Referee: Mathieu Souare

York9 FC won 1–0 on aggregate.

== Second qualifying round ==
=== Summary ===
The first legs were held on June 4 and 5, and the second legs were held on June 11 and 12, 2019.

Team 1	Agg.	Team 2	1st leg	2nd leg
York9 FC	3–2	FC Edmonton	3–1	0–1
Forge FC	2–3 (Note: Order of legs reversed after original draw.)	Cavalry FC	1–1	1–2
HFX Wanderers FC	4–1	Valour FC	2–1	2–0

=== Matches ===
June 5
7:00 pm EDT

York9 FC	3–1	FC Edmonton
Gasparotto 28'; Gattas 31'; Adjei 51'	Report	Diouck 66'

York Lions Stadium, Toronto, Ontario
Attendance: 728
Referee: Serge Topalian
June 12
7:30 pm MDT

FC Edmonton	1–0	York9 FC
Temguia 90+4'	Report

Clarke Stadium, Edmonton, Alberta
Attendance: 2,076
Referee: Fabrizio Stasolla

York9 FC won 3–2 on aggregate.

June 4
7:30 pm EDT

Forge FC	1–1	Cavalry FC
Welshman 48'	Report	Malonga 90+6' (pen.)

Tim Hortons Field, Hamilton, Ontario
Attendance: 5,174
Referee: David Barrie
June 11
7:30 pm MDT

Cavalry FC	2–1	Forge FC
Malonga 41'; Camargo 58'	Report	Bekker 13'

ATCO Field, Foothills County, Alberta
Attendance: 4,000
Referee: Pierre-Luc Lauzière

Cavalry FC won 3–2 on aggregate.

June 5
6:15 pm ADT

HFX Wanderers FC	2–1	Valour FC
Skublak 39'; Kourouma 41'	Report	Bustos 33'

Wanderers Grounds, Halifax, Nova Scotia
Attendance: 3,854
Referee: Juan Marquez
June 12
7:30 pm CDT

Valour FC	0–2	HFX Wanderers FC
	Report	Kourouma 58'; Bona 90+3'

IG Field, Winnipeg, Manitoba
Attendance: 4,373
Referee: Yusri Rudolf

HFX Wanderers FC won 4–1 on aggregate.

== Third qualifying round ==
=== Summary ===
The first legs were held on July 10, and the second legs were held on July 24, 2019.

Team 1	Agg.	Team 2	1st leg	2nd leg
HFX Wanderers	4–5	Ottawa Fury FC	2–3	2–2
York9 FC	2–3	Montreal Impact	2–2	0–1
Cavalry FC	2–1	Vancouver Whitecaps FC	0–0	2–1

=== Matches ===
July 10
7:00 pm ADT

HFX Wanderers FC	2–3	Ottawa Fury FC
Perea 32' (pen.); Barnathan 62' (o.g.)	Report	Thiago 23', 35'; Tissot 67'

Wanderers Grounds, Halifax, Nova Scotia
Attendance: 6,213
Referee: Silviu Petrescu
July 24
7:30 pm EDT

Ottawa Fury FC	2–2	HFX Wanderers FC
Obasi 45+1'; François 66'	Report	Skublak 30'; Perea 43'

TD Place Stadium, Ottawa, Ontario
Attendance: 4,443
Referee: Pierre-Luc Lauzière

Ottawa Fury FC won 5–4 on aggregate.

July 10
7:30 pm EDT

York9 FC	2–2	Montreal Impact
Telfer 83'; Gattas 88'	Report	Browne 62'; Taïder 90+2' (pen.)

York Lions Stadium, Toronto, Ontario
Attendance: 5,252
Referee: Yusri Rudolf
July 24
7:30 pm EDT

Montreal Impact	1–0	York9 FC
Piatti 55' (pen.)	Report

Saputo Stadium, Montreal, Quebec
Attendance: 14,723
Referee: David Barrie

Montreal Impact won 3–2 on aggregate.

July 10
7:30 pm MDT

Cavalry FC	0–0	Vancouver Whitecaps FC
	Report

ATCO Field, Foothills County, Alberta
Attendance: 5,129
Referee: Pierre-Luc Lauzière
July 24
7:30 pm PDT

Vancouver Whitecaps FC	1–2	Cavalry FC
Hwang In-beom 67'	Report	Brown 7'; Zator 72'

BC Place, Vancouver, British Columbia
Attendance: 16,089
Referee: Alain Ruch

Cavalry FC won 2–1 on aggregate.

== Semi-finals ==
=== Summary ===
The first legs were held on August 7, and the second legs were held on August 14, 2019.

Team 1	Agg.	Team 2	1st leg	2nd leg
Ottawa Fury FC	0–5	Toronto FC	0–2	0–3
Montreal Impact	3–1 (Note: Order of legs reversed after original draw.)	Cavalry FC	2–1	1–0

=== Matches ===
August 7
7:30 pm EDT

Ottawa Fury FC	0–2	Toronto FC
	Report	Moor 30'; Endoh 90+1'

TD Place Stadium, Ottawa, Ontario
Attendance: 5,809
Referee: David Barrie
August 14
7:30 pm EDT

Toronto FC	3–0	Ottawa Fury FC
DeLeon 14', 39'; Mullins 37'	Report

BMO Field, Toronto, Ontario
Attendance: 12,683
Referee: David Gantar

Toronto FC won 5–0 on aggregate.

August 7
7:30 pm EDT

Montreal Impact	2–1	Cavalry FC
Piatti 32', 49'	Report	Camargo 69'

Saputo Stadium, Montreal, Quebec
Attendance: 12,665
Referee: Silviu Petrescu
August 14
7:30 pm MDT

Cavalry FC	0–1	Montreal Impact
	Report	Jackson-Hamel 13'

ATCO Field, Foothills County, Alberta
Attendance: 5,633
Referee: Pierre-Luc Lauzière

Montreal Impact won 3–1 on aggregate.

== Final ==
=== Summary ===
The first leg was held on September 18, and the second leg was held on September 25, 2019. The higher-seeded team in the final, Toronto FC, chose to play the first leg away.

Team 1	Agg.	Team 2	1st leg	2nd leg
Montreal Impact	1–1 (3–1 p)	Toronto FC	1–0	0–1

=== Matches ===
September 18, 2019
7:30 pm EDT

Montreal Impact	1–0	Toronto FC
Piatti 17'	Report

Saputo Stadium, Montreal, Quebec
Attendance: 10,807
Referee: Yusri Rudolf
September 25, 2019
7:30 pm EDT

Toronto FC	1–0	Montreal Impact
Endoh 70'	Report
Penalties
Pozuelo (penalty scored); Altidore (penalty missed); Mullins (penalty missed); Osorio (penalty missed)	1–3	(penalty scored) Bojan; (penalty scored) Lovitz; (penalty scored) Camacho

BMO Field, Toronto, Ontario
Attendance: 21,365
Referee: Drew Fischer

1–1 on aggregate. Montreal Impact won 3–1 on penalties.

== Goalscorers ==
Team eliminated or did not play in this round.

Rank	Player	Team	Goals	By round									
Rank	Player	Team	Goals	1Q1	1Q2	2Q1	2Q2	3Q1	3Q2	SF1	SF2	F1	F2
1	(Argentina) Ignacio Piatti	Montreal Impact	4						1	2		1	
2	(Guinea) Mohamed Kourouma	HFX Wanderers FC	3	1		1	1						
2	(Canada) Tomasz Skublak	HFX Wanderers FC	3	1		1			1				
4	(Canada) Sergio Camargo	Cavalry FC	2				1			1			
4	(Brazil) Thiago De Freitas	Ottawa Fury FC	2					2					
4	(United States) Nick DeLeon	Toronto FC	2								2		
4	(Japan) Tsubasa Endoh	Toronto FC	2							1			1
4	(Chile) Rodrigo Gattas	York9 FC	2			1		1					
4	(Republic of the Congo) Dominique Malonga	Cavalry FC	2			1	1						
4	(Colombia) Luis Perea	HFX Wanderers FC	2					1	1				
4	(Canada) Ryan Telfer	York9 FC	2		1			1					
4	(Canada) Dominick Zator	Cavalry FC	2	1					1				
