= Kalingalinga =

Suburb of Lusaka, Zambia

Coordinates: 15°24′16.73″S 28°20′9.05″E

Kalingalinga is a low-income, high-density neighbourhood in Lusaka, Zambia. As of 2013, it comprised 25,000 to 30,000 residents. it borders the townships of Mtendere and Kabulonga, and many of its occupants are people who were discouraged from settling in Lusaka and moved as squatters to outlying regions of the city.

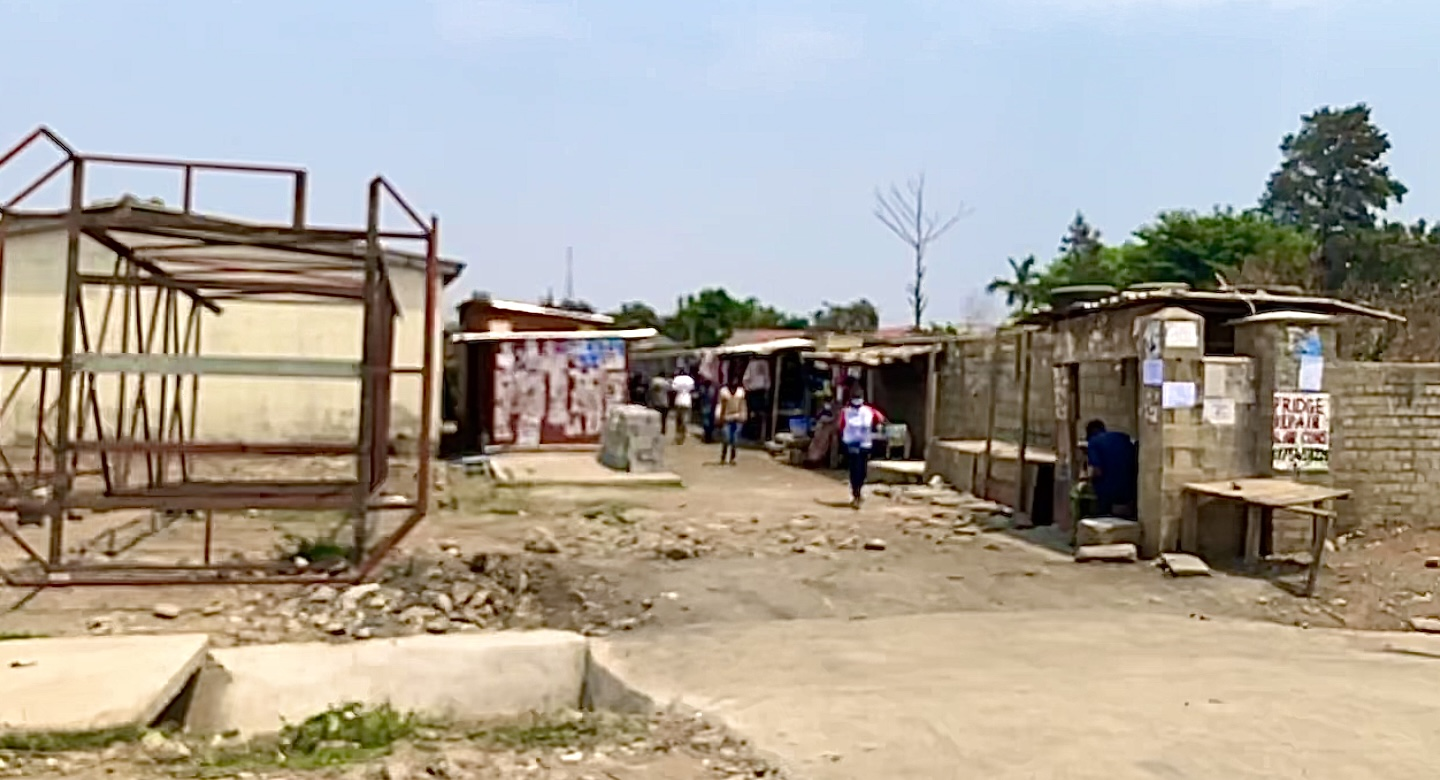
Kalingalinga

== History ==
It was one of Lusaka's earliest squatter settlements. By the late 1960s, many of Kalingalinga's residents were lured to Chainama Hills (later renamed "Mtendere"), a newly opened development that promised "water, good roads, schools, and a clinic". Those who left for Chainama Hills were mostly supporters of president Kaunda's UNIP, leaving behind a population with considerable support for the opposition Northern Rhodesian African National Congress. By the late 1970s, assistance from the Deutsche Gesellschaft für Internationale Zusammenarbeit in the form of a major urban upgrading project provided a school, water, street lighting, and other necessities, such as loans and legal assistance in applying for land ownership. According to a report by the United Nations Human Settlements Programme, by 1991 the urban upgrading of Kalingalinga "enabled 4400 low-income squatter households to obtain improved houses, services and security of tenure". It noted, on the political situation, that progress initially had been slow because the population mostly supported the political opposition, but also that local organizations had been quite effective in the initiation, planning, and execution of the improvements. An overview of the project, which was completed in 1987 and supported until 1992, is provided by the World Bank Group.

On the difference in status between inhabitants of Kalingalinga and other townships, former Minister of Foreign Affairs Katele Kalumba, who had been instrumental in implementing policies ostensibly designed to clean up the townships but which in reality mainly harassed the poor, said "Whose town is it? It appears that if you live in Woodlands, Kabulonga, and so on, you are the town owners, and if you live in Kaunda square or Kalingalinga or places like this, you are simply strangers in the city who can be moved and resettled somewhere".

== Government and challenges ==
Self-regulation in Kalingalinga proved difficult at times, though it has served as a model for the development of the administration of other townships; the Kalingalinga community proved it could organize for the common good, even at the expense of immediate personal gain. For instance, when it became accepted to use the locally abundant laterite (rather than cement blocks) to build houses, many inhabitants began digging up the soil to build their own houses and to sell on the market, thereby harming the soil and disturbing the drainage of rainwater; the soil was no longer used to grow vegetables on. The problems exacerbating, the community decided to ban the digging for laterite in the settlement itself, and a neighboring site was opened where locals could dig up laterite for a small fee. The mixed quality of Kalingalinga, where older residents run small businesses and work with locally produced material, while the younger generation feels more economic and other progress has been made, makes it "a microcosm of our society and a mirror of our progress", according to Andrew Sardanis.

One of Kalingalinga's challenges is the much more frequent flooding and other weather-related incidents. Especially housing is impacted by flooding; a study showed that while locals are taking measures to adapt to the changing circumstances, there is little support from the government.

Another challenge is HIV/Aids. Our Lady's Hospice in Kalingalinga has participated in studies on the disease, and received a grant from the British High Commission for promoting AIDS awareness and peer education programs. The hospice is supported by Irish Aid, Contesa Charity, and other donors.

In 1990, the government's removal of food subsidies led to widespread rioting in Lusaka; the riots started in Kalingalinga before spreading to the city center, killing over 30 people.

== Socioeconomic characteristics ==
According to a 1992/1993 survey, almost 70% of women and slightly over 40% of men in Kalingalinga were involved in agriculture; over 30% of women and less than 20% of men were involved in (dry-season) gardening.

Some young boys from Kalingalinga fell victim to a scheme set up by a Texas group called Teaching Teachers to Teach, supposedly a Baptist missionary organization that took some boys over the United States to sing in a choir. In return for their singing, money was to be sent back for schools and other essentials, and the boys were to receive schooling. However, the boys were practically enslaved in the US, forced to sing up to seven concerts per day and to dig a swimming pool for the minister leading the group, Keith Grimes, who pocketed the choir's earnings. By 2000, Grimes had died and his daughter was trying to do damage control when the group of boys had found out that nothing was done to improve the situation in Kalingalinga. She tried to have a number of boys deported, which led the US Immigration and Naturalization Service to investigate the matter and, in the end, free the choir. Grimes's daughter and her husband were never charged, since the abuse occurred months before the Victims of Trafficking and Violence Protection Act of 2000 was passed.

== Recreational activities ==
The charity Africa On The Ball helped found the football team Kalingalinga FC in 2011, a team which is as much about playing football as it is about proper nutrition and education. By the 2022/23 Football Association of Zambia season Africa on the Ball FC (formerly Kalingalinga FC until 2013) were running 3 women's and 5 men's teams and a wider 'in the community' outreach programme Zambia wide. The sale of a jersey by Kenya-born football player Victor Wanyama in 2013 was to pay for a team bus.
