= Chilenje =

Suburb of Lusaka, Zambia

Coordinates: 15°27′0″S 28°20′0″E

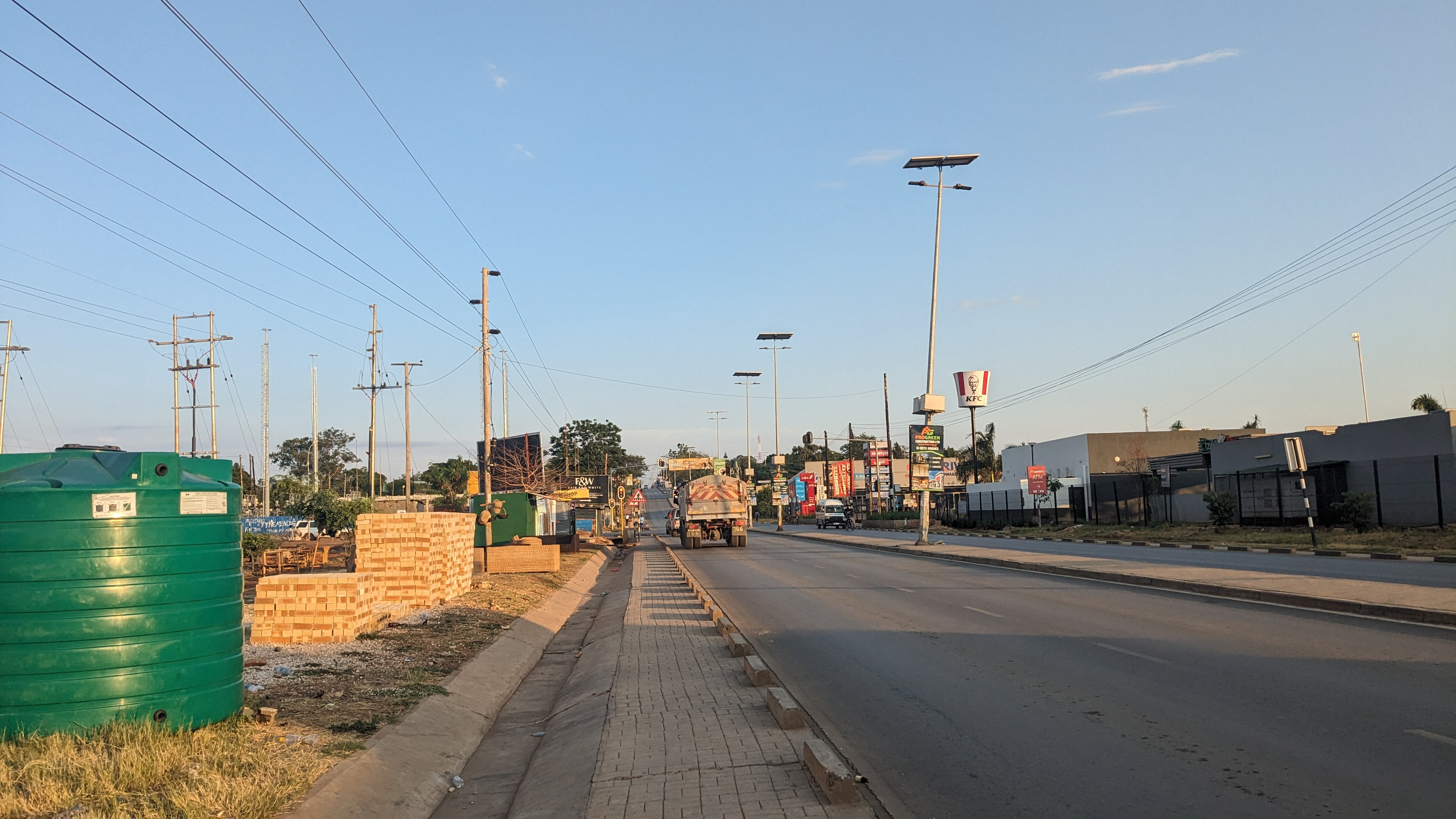
Mosi-o-tunya Road, Chilenje

Chilenje is a township residential area located in Lusaka city, Lusaka Province, Zambia. It consists of two sections, New Chilenje and Chilenje South. New Chilenje is composed mainly of British Colonial low cost houses suitable for bachelors. A typical house in this section is the Chilenje museum known as Chilenje House 394. The other section consists of middle cost houses, according to the Zambian housing standards.

Africa Directions describes Chilenje as "a peri-urban township with slightly higher levels of education and income per household than Mtendere. While this means families are able to meet basic needs, on the flip side this disposable income also leads to more alcohol and drug abuse. Places that were formally open for youth to play have been converted to bars and taverns attracting youth with their loud music, TVs, and games." For this reason, the PAMO Youth Centre was opened in Chilenje, with support from UNICEF and Norwegian Church Aid, in 2004.

In 2012, residents were demanding improvements in sanitation and increased medical staffing to end the long queues at the Chilenje Clinic health centre.
