= Ismaël Koné =

Canadian soccer player (born 2002)

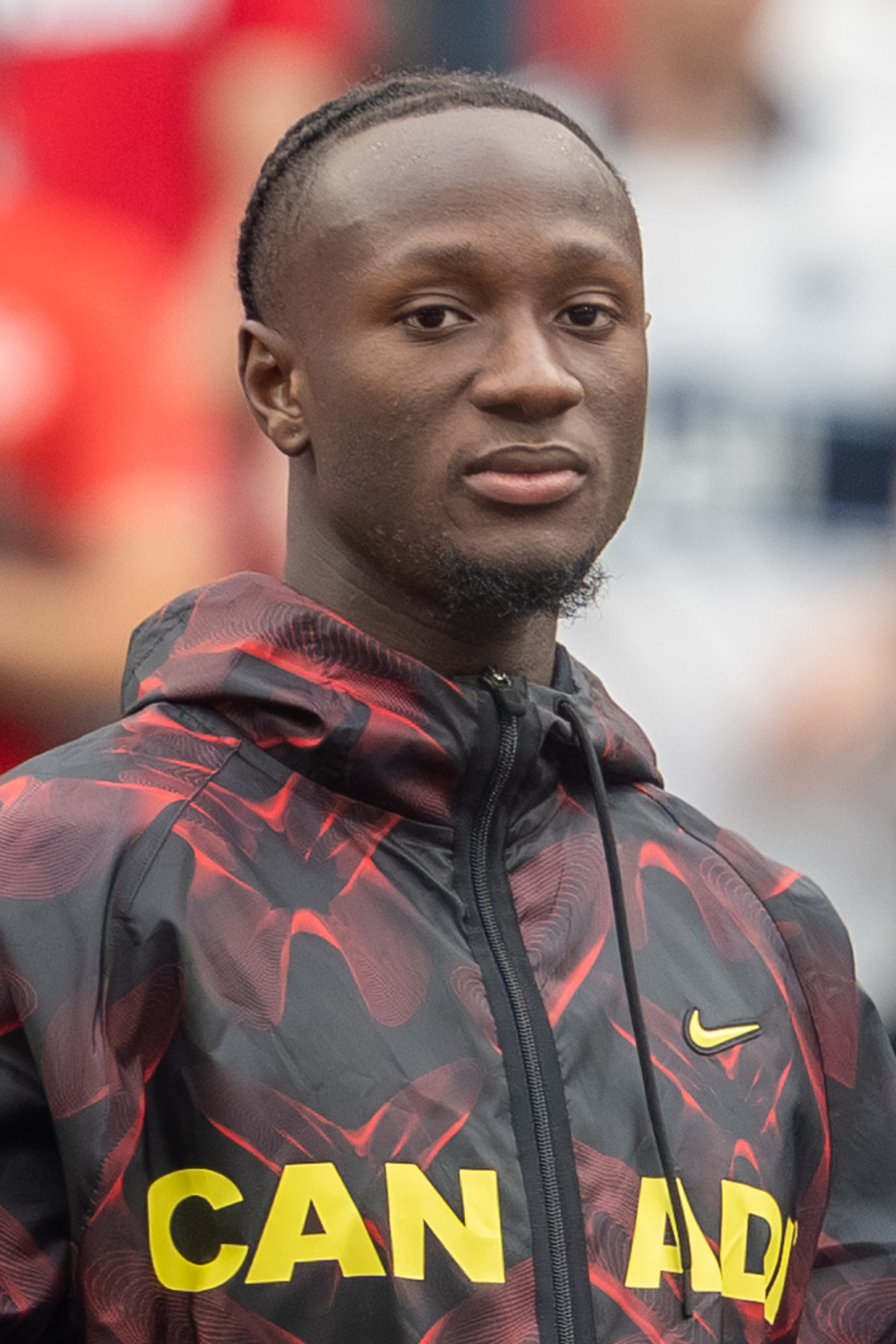
- Koné with Canada in 2026

Personal information
- Full name: Ismaël Kenneth Jordan Koné
- Date of birth: June 16, 2002 (age 24)
- Place of birth: Abidjan, Ivory Coast
- Height: 1.88 m (6 ft 2 in)
- Position: Midfielder

Team information
- Current team: Sassuolo
- Number: 90

Youth career
- 2012–2018: AS Notre-Dame-de-Grâce
- 2019–2020: CS Saint-Laurent
- 2020–2021: CF Montréal

Senior career*
Years	Team	Apps	(Gls)
2021–2022	CF Montréal	26	(2)
2022–2024	Watford	58	(4)
2024–2026	Marseille	8	(0)
2025	→ Rennes (loan)	13	(2)
2025–2026	→ Sassuolo (loan)	20	(4)
2026–	Sassuolo	15	(2)

International career^{‡}
2022–	Canada	42	(4)
Medal record
Representing Canada
Men's soccer
CONCACAF Nations League
Runner-up	2023 United States
Third place	2025 United States
- * Club domestic league appearances and goals as of May 24, 2026 ‡ National team caps and goals as of June 18, 2026

Ismaël Kenneth Jordan Koné (born June 16, 2002) is a professional soccer player who plays as a midfielder for Serie A club Sassuolo. Born in the Ivory Coast, he plays for the Canada national team.

Koné began his professional playing career with Major League Soccer club CF Montréal in 2021. In late 2022, Koné agreed to join EFL Championship club Watford. After two seasons in England, Koné joined Ligue 1 club Marseille, but he struggled for playing time with the French club, and went on two loan spells, first with fellow Ligue 1 side Rennes and then Serie A club Sassuolo. In early 2026, Koné joined Sassuolo on a permanent deal.

Koné received his first call-up to the Canada national team in 2022 for that year's FIFA World Cup qualification matches, and was ultimately named to Canada's squad for the 2022 FIFA World Cup. For Koné's performances in his debut season, he was named that year's Canadian Youth Player of the Year. The following year, Koné participated in the 2023 CONCACAF Nations League Finals, and was again named the Canadian Youth Player of the Year for a second consecutive season. Koné has since represented Canada at the 2024 Copa América, 2025 CONCACAF Gold Cup, and 2026 FIFA World Cup.

== Early life ==
Ismaël Kenneth Jordan Koné was born on June 16, 2002 in Abidjan, Ivory Coast. In 2010, he moved to Canada with his mother at age 7, growing up in Montreal. Two years later, he began playing youth soccer with the AS Notre-Dame-de-Grâce Panthers.

When he was 16, he joined CS Saint-Laurent. With CS Saint-Laurent he earned the bronze medal at the 2019 Canadian Under-17 Championship. He went on trial in Belgium with Genk and Mouscron, but was unable to sign with Mouscron as they did not have the funds available to sign a non-European player. Soon afterwards, he was forced to return to Canada due to the COVID-19 pandemic, where he began training with CF Montreal U23 and earned an invitation to the first team's training camp in 2021.

== Club career ==
=== CF Montréal ===
After a few months training with the CF Montréal first team, initially unable to sign a contract due to “some technicalities in MLS rules,” Koné officially signed a two-year contract with two option years on August 13, 2021. However, soon after signing his contract he suffered a knee injury, which limited his participation in training.

After the 2021 season, he went to train with Montreal's sister club, Serie A club Bologna. Koné made his professional debut and scored his first goal with Montreal in a 3–0 win against Santos Laguna on February 23, 2022, in the 2022 CONCACAF Champions League. During the 2022 summer transfer window, EFL Championship clubs Sheffield United and Norwich City were reported to have approached Montréal over Koné's services.

=== Watford ===
In December 2022, EFL Championship club Watford announced they had agreed to sign Koné on a transfer from CF Montréal, with the midfielder penning a four-and-a-half-year deal. He made his debut on January 7, 2023, starting an FA Cup match against Reading. Koné scored his first goal for Watford in a 3–2 win over Norwich on November 28, 2023. In June 2024, Marseille would announce that they had reached an agreement with Watford to sign Koné pending a medical, with Watford confirming that Koné would depart the club after appearing in 63 games and scoring four goals.

=== Marseille ===
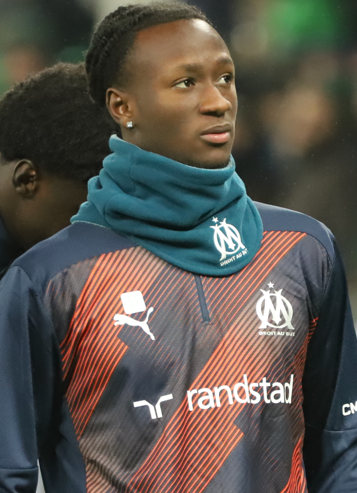
Koné with Marseille in 2024.

On June 28, 2024, it was announced Ligue 1 club Olympique Marseille had reached an agreement for the permanent signing of Koné, for a reported transfer fee of £15m including add-ons. After ankle injuries initially prevented him from practicing or playing regularly, Koné's time at Marseille became dominated by discussions of conflict between him and manager Roberto De Zerbi.

On January 24, 2025, De Zerbi publicly stated that the player "hasn't shown me that he's capable of being part of this project," and indicated that he would likely leave the club. In August 2025, Marseille released a documentary account of its 2024–25 season that included footage of a training altercation between the two.

==== Loan to Rennes ====
On February 3, 2025, Koné joined Rennes on loan for the remainder of the 2024–25 season. In the final match of the 2024–25 Ligue 1 season at the Stade Vélodrome, he scored a long-range goal from 30 meters against his parent club, Marseille.

=== Sassuolo ===
On July 29, 2025, amidst further media reports of incompatibility between Koné and De Zerbi, Koné was loaned to Serie A club Sassuolo. He made his official debut on August 15 in a Coppa Italia match against US Catanzaro, starting and playing 84 minutes in a 1–0 victory. On February 2, 2026, Sassuolo made the transfer permanent.

On March 1, 2026, Koné scored the opening goal and was named man of the match in Sassuolo's 2–1 victory over Atalanta, with the goal coming eight minutes after Sassuolo had been reduced to ten men.

== International career ==
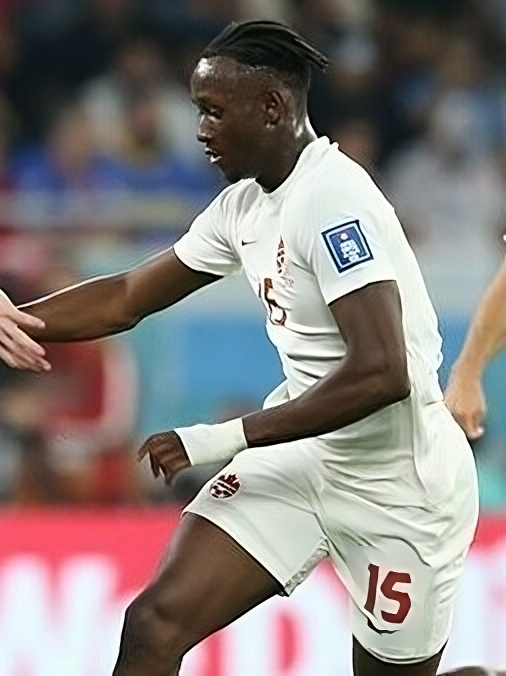
Koné playing for Canada at the 2022 FIFA World Cup

Koné was eligible to play for Canada and the Ivory Coast. In March 2022, Koné was called up to Canada for their final window of 2022 FIFA World Cup qualification matches. He made his debut on March 24 against Costa Rica, as a substitute for Jonathan Osorio.

Koné scored his first international goal for Canada in a friendly against Bahrain on November 11, 2022. Two days later on November 13, he was named to Canada's 26-man squad for the 2022 FIFA World Cup. He appeared in all three of the team's matches at the World Cup. At the end of the year, Koné was named the men's 2022 Canada Soccer Young Player of the Year. The following year, Koné was awarded again the Canada Soccer Young Player of the Year.

In June 2023, Koné was called up to Canada ahead of the 2023 CONCACAF Nations League Finals. He scored in the second leg of the quarterfinals against Jamaica.

In June 2024, Koné was named to Canada's squad for the 2024 Copa América. After starting in Les Rouges' first two games, Koné was benched for Jonathan Osorio for the final group stage match—a 0–0 draw that sent Canada to the quarterfinals.

In May 2026, Koné was selected for Canada's squad for the 2026 FIFA World Cup, which Canada co-hosted with Mexico and the United States. On June 12, Koné was selected as player of the match in a 1–1 draw with Bosnia and Herzegovina during both teams' opening group stage game of the 2026 FIFA World Cup, which saw Canada earn their first World Cup point ever. On June 18, Koné was injured during the 51st minute of Canada's second group stage match against Qatar by a tackle from Assim Madibo, who was issued a red card. Medical staff put an air cast on Koné's left leg and he was taken off the pitch on a stretcher as Canada later went on to win the game 6–0, their first win at a World Cup. The team announced the following day that Koné underwent a successful surgery for his fractured tibia and fibula.

== Style of play ==
Koné is a strong and willing dribbler who favours direct attacking runs, covers ground effortlessly, and maintains composure under pressure.

During his loan at Stade Rennais, Koné showcased increased dynamism, aggression in duels, and effectiveness in breaking defensive lines, qualities that had been less evident at Olympique de Marseille. Head coach Habib Beye praised Koné, stating, "Ismaël is a player of immense quality."

== Career statistics ==
=== Club ===
As of match played May 24, 2026

Appearances and goals by club, season and competition
Club	Season	League			National cup (Note: Includes Canadian Championship, FA Cup, Coupe de France, Coppa Italia)		League cup (Note: Includes EFL Cup)		Continental		Other		Total	
Club	Season	Division	Apps	Goals	Apps	Goals	Apps	Goals	Apps	Goals	Apps	Goals	Apps	Goals
CF Montréal	2021	Major League Soccer	0	0	0	0	—		—		—		0	0
CF Montréal	2022	Major League Soccer	26	2	1	0	—		3 (Note: Appearances in CONCACAF Champions League)	1	2 (Note: Appearances in MLS Cup playoffs)	1	32	4
CF Montréal	Total		26	2	1	0	—		3	1	2	1	32	4
Watford	2022–23	Championship	16	0	1	0	—		—		—		17	0
Watford	2023–24	Championship	42	4	3	0	1	0	—		—		46	4
Watford	Total		58	4	4	0	1	0	—		—		63	4
Marseille	2024–25	Ligue 1	8	0	1	0	—		—		—		9	0
Rennes (loan)	2024–25	Ligue 1	13	2	—		—		—		—		13	2
Sassuolo (loan)	2025–26	Serie A	20	4	1	0	—		—		—		21	4
Sassuolo	2025–26	Serie A	15	2	—		—		—		—		15	2
Sassuolo	Sassuolo total		35	6	1	0	—		—		—		36	6
Career total			140	13	7	0	1	0	3	1	2	1	153	15

=== International ===
As of match played June 18, 2026

Appearances and goals by national team and year
National team	Year	Apps	Goals
Canada	2022	9	1
Canada	2023	7	1
Canada	2024	10	1
Canada	2025	11	1
Canada	2026	5	0
Total		42	4

Scores and results list Canada's goal tally first.

List of international goals scored by Ismaël Koné
No.	Date	Venue	Opponent	Score	Result	Competition
1	November 11, 2022	Khalifa Sports City Stadium, Isa Town, Bahrain	Bahrain	1–0	2–2	Friendly
2	November 21, 2023	BMO Field, Toronto, Canada	Jamaica	2–2	2–3	2023–24 CONCACAF Nations League A
3	July 13, 2024	Bank of America Stadium, Charlotte, United States	Uruguay	1–1	2–2 (3–4 p)	2024 Copa América
4	November 18, 2025	Chase Stadium, Fort Lauderdale, United States	Venezuela	1–0	2–0	Friendly

== Honours ==
Individual

- Canada Soccer Youth Player of the Year: 2022, 2023

== Personal life ==
Koné is a Muslim and fasts during Ramadan while playing matches.
