= Chilenje House 394 =

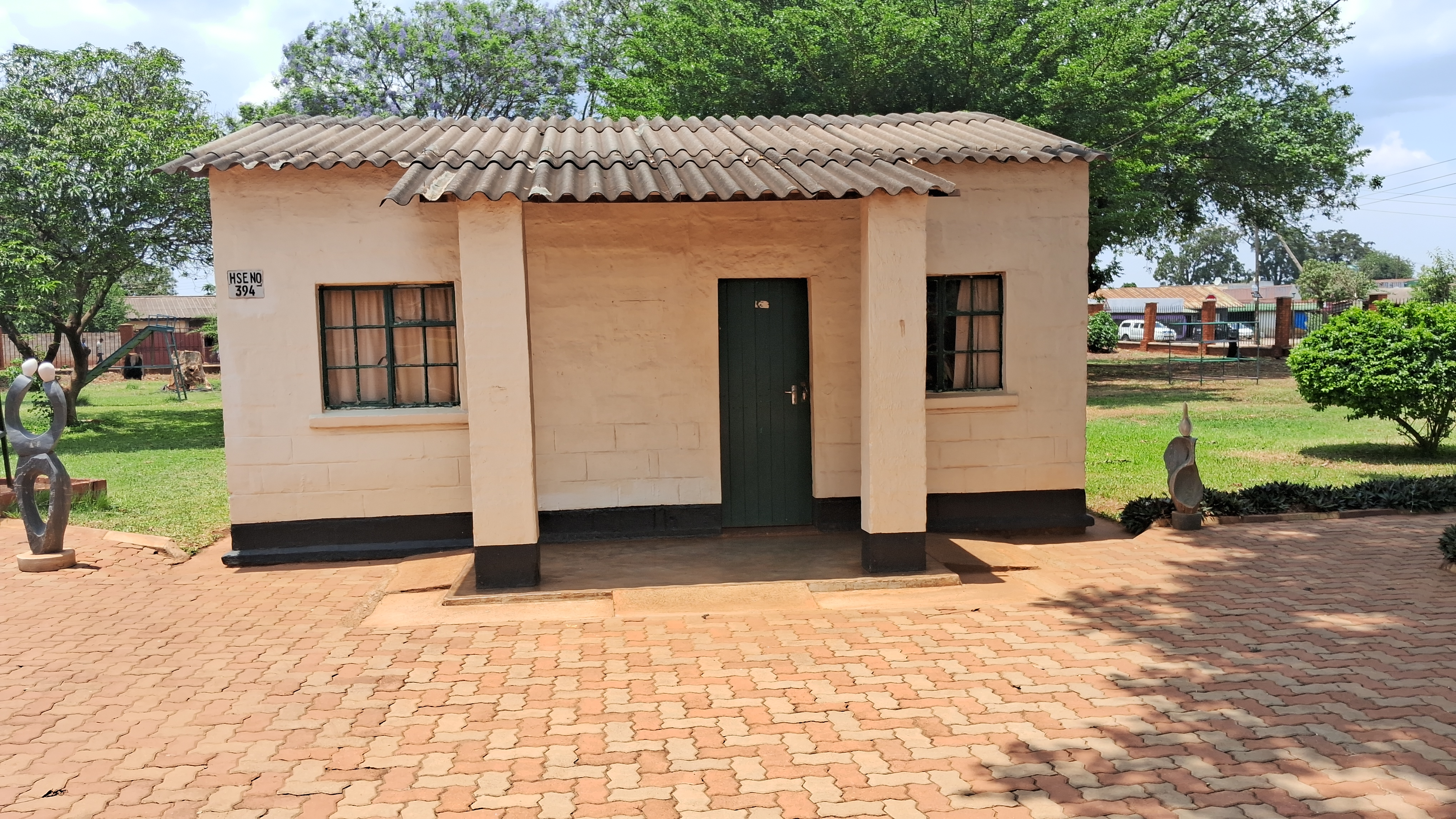
- Chilenje House 394 in Lusaka, October 2024

- Location in Zambia
- Established: 23 October 1968
- Location: Chilenje, Lusaka, Zambia
- Coordinates: 15.44397°S 28.33229°E
- Type: Historic house museum
- Visitors: Open to the public daily except Monday afternoons and Tuesdays
- Founder: Dr. Kenneth Kaunda
- Public transit access: Accessible via Lusaka city transport
- Website: Chilenje House 394 on eZambia.com

Chilenje House 394, located in Chilenje, Lusaka, Zambia, is a museum house in which Dr Kenneth Kaunda lived from January 1960 to December 1962. He later became the first president of Zambia. From this house, he directed the struggle for Independence of Zambia, which was finally achieved on 24 October 1964.

It is described as a simple two-bed roomed residential house with a small living room and a kitchen. It lies in a spacious compound littered with giant trees that seem to thrive on a stony ground."

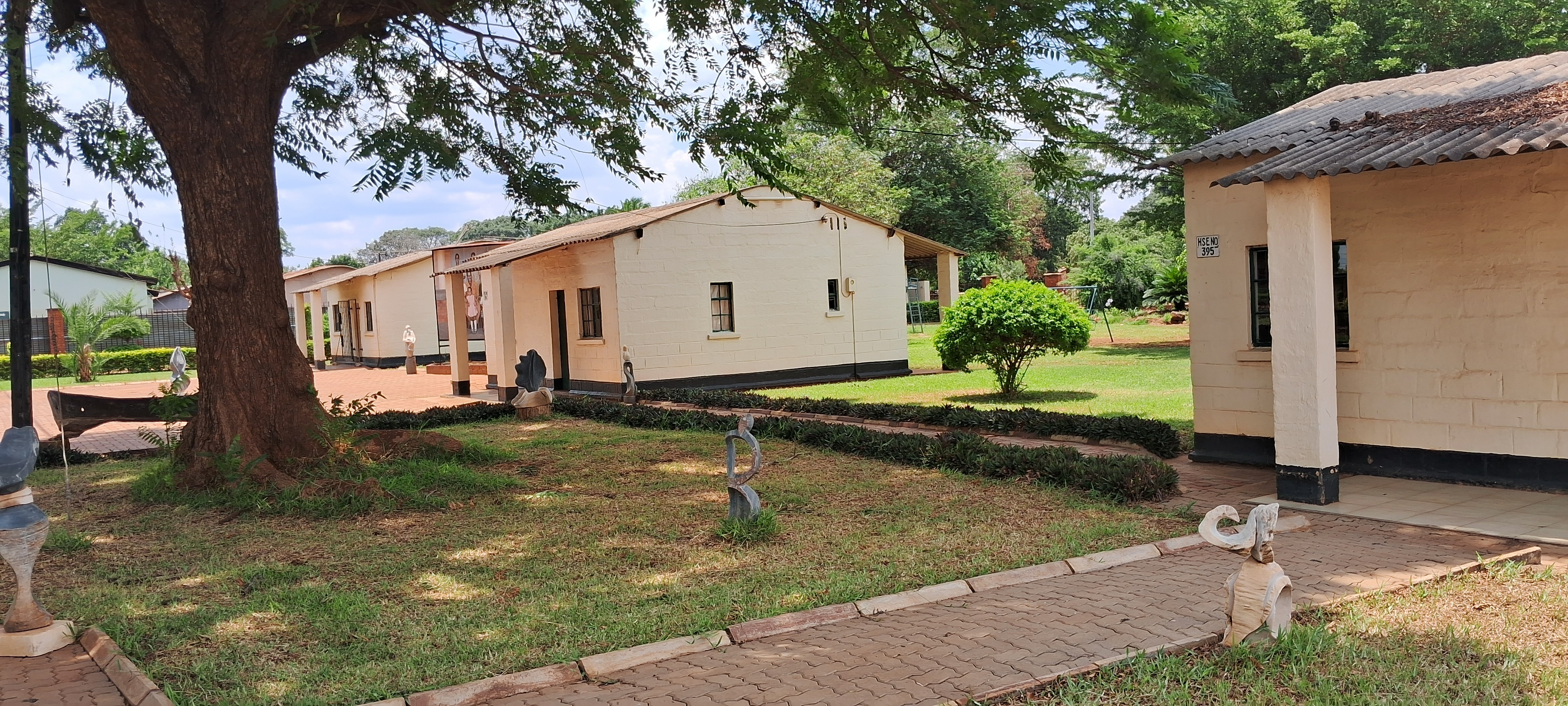
Three houses that are included in the protected monument

Three houses are included in the protected monument, and have been restored as nearly as possible to their 1962 condition by the demolition of improvements effected since that date. House No. 394 has been redecorated in its original colour scheme, and much of the furniture and personal effects used by the Kenneth Kaunda family at that time has been replaced in the original positions. House No. 395 contains displays illustrating the history and growth of Lusaka from the earliest times and the political development of Zambia. House No. 393 is the caretaker's residence.

The monument was officially opened by Dr Kenneth Kaunda on 23 October 1968. It is open to the public daily except on Monday afternoons and Tuesdays, from 10:00hrs to 13:00hrs and from 14:00hrs to 17:00hrs.

== Declaration ==
The site was declared as a National Monument and its doors opened to the public on 23 October 1968. It has since been managed by the National Heritage Conservation Commission.

== See also ==
- Kenneth Kaunda
