= 2022 CF Montréal season =

Canadian Major League Soccer team

CF Montréal
2022 season
- Owner: Joey Saputo
- Head coach: Wilfried Nancy
- Stadium: Saputo Stadium
- Major League Soccer: Conference: 2nd Overall: 3rd
- MLS Cup Playoffs: Conference Semifinals
- Canadian Championship: Semi-finals
- CONCACAF Champions League: Quarter-finals
- Top goalscorer: League: Romell Quioto (15); All: Romell Quioto (16)
- Highest home attendance: 21,388 (March 16 vs. Cruz Azul)
- Lowest home attendance: 12,042 (April 16 vs. Vancouver Whitecaps FC)
- Average home league attendance: 14,828
- Biggest win: 3–0 (February 22 v. Santos Laguna, CCL); 4–1 (May 7 v. Orlando City SC, MLS); 3–0 (May 25 v. Forge FC, CC)
- Biggest defeat: 0–4 (June 22 at Toronto FC, CC); 0–4 (July 4 at LA Galaxy, MLS)
Home colours	Away colours

The 2022 Club de Foot Montréal season was the club's 29th season of existence, and their 11th in Major League Soccer (MLS), the top tier of the American soccer pyramid.

In addition to competing in MLS, the club also played in Canadian Championship, where they were defending their title from 2021, and the 2022 CONCACAF Champions League.

== Squad ==
As of September 6, 2022

No.	Name	Nationality	Position	Date of birth (age at year end)	Previous club
Goalkeepers
1	Sebastian Breza	CAN	GK	March 16, 1998 (age 28)	(Italy) Bologna
25	Logan Ketterer	USA	GK	November 9, 1993 (age 33)	(United States) El Paso Locomotive FC
41	James Pantemis	CAN	GK	February 21, 1997 (age 29)	(Canada) Montreal Impact Academy
Defenders
3	Kamal Miller	CAN	CB	May 16, 1997 (age 29)	(United States) Austin FC
4	Rudy Camacho	FRA	CB	March 5, 1991 (age 35)	(Belgium) Waasland-Beveren
5	Gabriele Corbo	ITA	CB	January 11, 2000 (age 26)	(Italy) Bologna
15	Zachary Brault-Guillard	CAN	RB	December 30, 1998 (age 27)	(France) Lyon
16	Joel Waterman	CAN	CB	January 24, 1996 (age 30)	(Canada) Cavalry FC
19	Zorhan Bassong	CAN	LB	May 7, 1999 (age 27)	(Belgium) Cercle Brugge
22	Alistair Johnston	CAN	RB	October 8, 1998 (age 28)	(United States) Nashville SC
26	Róbert Thorkelsson	ISL	CB	April 3, 2002 (age 24)	(Iceland) Breiðablik
33	Keesean Ferdinand	CAN	LB	August 17, 2003 (age 23)	(Canada) Montreal Impact Academy
Midfielders
2	Victor Wanyama	KEN	DM	June 25, 1991 (age 35)	(England) Tottenham Hotspur
6	Samuel Piette	CAN	DM	November 12, 1994 (age 32)	(Spain) CD Izarra
7	Ahmed Hamdy	EGY	CM	February 10, 1998 (age 28)	(Egypt) El Gouna FC
8	Djordje Mihailovic	USA	AM	November 10, 1998 (age 28)	(United States) Chicago Fire FC
11	Matko Miljevic	USA	AM	May 9, 2001 (age 25)	(Argentina) Argentinos Juniors
18	Rida Zouhir	CAN	CM	November 23, 2003 (age 22)	(Canada) Montreal Impact Academy
28	Ismaël Koné	CAN	CM	June 6, 2002 (age 24)	(Canada) Saint-Laurent Soccer Club
29	Mathieu Choinière	CAN	AM	February 7, 1999 (age 27)	(Canada) Montreal Impact Academy
34	Tomas Giraldo	CAN	AM	March 8, 2003 (age 23)	(Canada) Montreal Impact Academy
36	Nathan Saliba	CAN	CM	February 7, 2004 (age 22)	(Canada) Montreal Impact Academy
Attackers
9	Bjørn Johnsen	NOR	FW	November 6, 1991 (age 35)	(South Korea) Ulsan Hyundai
10	Joaquín Torres	ARG	FW	January 28, 1997 (age 29)	(Argentina) Newell's Old Boys
13	Mason Toye	USA	FW	October 16, 1998 (age 28)	(United States) Minnesota United FC
14	Sunusi Ibrahim	NGA	FW	October 1, 2002 (age 24)	(Nigeria) Nasarawa United F.C.
17	Jojea Kwizera	COD	FW	January 1, 1999 (age 27)	(United States) Utah Valley Wolverines
21	Lassi Lappalainen	FIN	FW	August 24, 1998 (age 28)	(Italy) Bologna
23	Kei Kamara	SLE	FW	September 1, 1984 (age 42)	(Finland) HIFK Fotboll
30	Romell Quioto	HON	FW	August 9, 1991 (age 35)	(United States) Houston Dynamo

=== International roster slots ===
Montreal currently has six MLS International Roster Slots for use in the 2022 season. Montreal has eight slots allotted from the league and sold one to Orlando City SC and one to LAFC. In addition, starting in 2022, CF Montreal are allowed to make three international players exempt from status if they have been on the roster for more than one year.

CF Montréal International slots
Slot	Player	Nationality
Exempt	Lassi Lappalainen	Finland
Exempt	Rudy Camacho	France
Exempt	Victor Wanyama	Kenya
1	Ahmed Hamdy	Egypt
2	Sunusi Ibrahim	Nigeria
3	Róbert Thorkelsson	Iceland
4	Joaquín Torres	Argentina
5	Gabriele Corbo	Italy
6	Vacant	

Foreign-Born Players with Domestic Status
Player	Nationality
Romell Quioto	Honduras ^{G}
Kei Kamara	Sierra Leone ^{G}
Bjørn Johnsen	Norway / (United States) USA
Matko Miljevic	Argentina / (United States) USA
Jojea Kwizera	(Democratic Republic of the Congo) / (United States) USA
Zachary Brault-Guillard	Haiti / Canada
Tomas Giraldo	Colombia / Canada
Zorhan Bassong	Belgium / Canada
Jean-Aniel Assi	Ivory Coast / Canada
Ismaël Koné	Ivory Coast / Canada

- (Canada) – Player is Canadian citizen;
- (United States) – Player is US citizen;
- G – Player has US green card;
- C – Player has permanent Canadian residency.

== Management ==
As of January 28, 2019

- Owner — (Canada) Joey Saputo
- Sporting director — (Belgium) Olivier Renard
- Global sporting director — (Italy) Walter Sabatini
- Assistant sporting director — (Canada) Vassili Cremanzidis
- Director of academy — (Canada) Patrick Leduc

== Coaching staff ==
As of July 29, 2022

- (France) Wilfried Nancy – head coach
- (Republic of Ireland) Kwame Ampadu – assistant coach
- (Belgium) Laurent Ciman – assistant coach
- (Italy) Francesco Morara – assistant coach
- (France) Romuald Peiser – goalkeeping coach
- (Canada) Jules Gueguen – fitness coach
- (France) Maxime Chalier - video analyst

== Player movement ==
=== In ===
Per Major League Soccer and club policies terms of the deals do not get disclosed.

No.	Pos.	Player	Transferred from	Fee/notes	Date	Source
7	MF	(Egypt) Ahmed Hamdy	(Egypt) El Gouna FC	Loan purchase option exercised	October 19, 2021	
10	FW	(Argentina) Joaquín Torres	(Argentina) Newell's Old Boys	Loan purchase option exercised	October 21, 2021	
21	FW	(Finland) Lassi Lappalainen	(Italy) Bologna F.C. 1909	Loan purchase option exercised	December 3, 2021	
22	DF	(Canada) Alistair Johnston	(United States) Nashville SC	Purchased for $1,000,000 in GAM	December 27, 2021	
25	GK	(United States) Logan Ketterer	(United States) El Paso Locomotive FC	Free Transfer	February 16, 2022	
23	FW	(Sierra Leone) Kei Kamara	(Finland) HIFK Fotboll	Free Transfer	February 18, 2022	
17	FW	(Democratic Republic of the Congo) Jojea Kwizera	(United States) Utah Valley Wolverines	MLS Super Draft	April 8, 2022	
27	FW	(Nigeria) Chinonso Offor	(United States) Chicago Fire FC	Purchased for $325,000 in GAM	August 5, 2022	

=== Out ===
No.	Pos.	Player	Transferred to	Fee/notes	Date	Source
24	DF	(Slovenia) Aljaž Struna	(Italy) A.C. Perugia Calcio	Option declined	November 30, 2021	
17	MF	(Canada) Ballou Tabla	(Canada) Atlético Ottawa	Option declined	November 30, 2021	
12	DF	(Uganda) Mustafa Kizza	(Tanzania) Young Africans S.C.	Option declined	November 30, 2021	
25	MF	(Argentina) Emanuel Maciel	(Argentina) Club Atlético Aldosivi	Option declined	November 30, 2021	
27	DF	(Canada) Clément Bayiha	(Norway) Hamarkameratene	Option declined	November 30, 2021	

=== Loans in ===
No.	Pos.	Player	Loaned from	Loan start date	Loan end date	Source
5	DF	(Italy) Gabriele Corbo	(Italy) Bologna	December 5, 2021	December 31, 2022	
1	GK	(Canada) Sebastian Breza	(Italy) Bologna	January 9, 2022	December 31, 2022	

=== Loans out ===
No.	Pos.	Player	Loaned to	Loan start date	Loan end date	Source
40	GK	(Canada) Jonathan Sirois	(Canada) Valour FC	March 11, 2021	December 31, 2022	
39	MF	(Canada) Sean Rea	(Canada) Valour FC	March 11, 2021	December 31, 2022	
24	DF	(Canada) Karifa Yao	(Canada) Cavalry FC	March 18, 2021	December 31, 2022	
35	FW	(Canada) Jean-Aniel Assi	(Canada) Cavalry FC	March 18, 2021	December 31, 2022	
27	FW	(Nigeria) Chinonso Offor	(Belgium) S.V. Zulte Waregem	September 7, 2022	June 30, 2023	

=== Draft picks ===
Round	No.	Pos.	Player	College/Club team	Transaction	Source
1	15	MF	(Democratic Republic of the Congo) Jojea Kwizera	(United States) Utah Valley Wolverines	Signed	
3	67	FW	(Haiti) Ivy Brisma	(United States) NC State Wolfpack		

== Friendlies ==
=== Pre-season ===
Unless otherwise noted, all times in EST

January 29 1	New York City FC	2–2	CF Montréal	Orlando, Florida
12:00 PM EST		Report	Torres; Ibrahim	Stadium: Exploria Stadium

February 4 2	Inter Miami CF	1–2	CF Montréal	Fort Lauderdale, Florida
5:00 PM EST	Goal	Report	Brisma,

February 8 3	Philadelphia Union	2–1	CF Montréal	Fort Lauderdale, Florida
6:00 PM EST			Koné	Stadium: Lockhart Stadium

February 11 4	Miami FC	1–2	CF Montréal	Fort Lauderdale, Florida
6:00 PM EST				Stadium: Lockhart Stadium

Win Draw Loss

== Major League Soccer Regular Season ==
=== Results ===
February 27 1	Orlando City SC	2–0	CF Montréal	Orlando, Florida
1:00 PM EST	Pato 49'; Araújo (yellow card) 56'; Michel 59'; Jansson (yellow card) 67' (yellow-red card) 81'; Moutinho (yellow card) 85'	Report	Quioto (red card) 66'; Wanyama (yellow card) 87'; Waterman (yellow card) 90+4'; J. Torres (yellow card) 90+5'	Stadium: Exploria Stadium; Attendance: 21,283; Referee: Marcos DeOliveira

March 5 2	CF Montréal	1–2	Philadelphia Union	Montreal, Quebec
4:00 PM EST	Koné (yellow card) 20'; Wanyama (yellow card) 23'; Lappalainen 32'; Zouhir (yellow card) 67'	Report	A. Bedoya 53'; D. Gazdag 56'; J. Carranza (yellow card) 64' (yellow-red card) 71'	Stadium: Olympic Stadium; Attendance: 13,067; Referee: Drew Fischer

March 12 3	New York City FC	4–1	CF Montréal	New York, New York
2:00 PM EST	Callens 7'; Rodríguez 20'; Morales (yellow card) 22'; Magno 64' de Andrade 83'	Report	Miljevic (yellow card) 36'; Brault-Guillard 52'	Stadium: Yankee Stadium; Attendance: 21,113; Referee: Armando Villarreal

March 19 4	Atlanta United FC	3–3	CF Montreal	Atlanta, Georgia
4:00 PM EDT	Gutman (yellow card) 4'; Martínez 6'; Dwyer (red card) 67'; Almada 85'; Lennon 90+2'; Sosa (yellow card) 90+4'	Report	Koné (yellow card) 10' (goal) 37'; Mihailovic 28'; Miller (yellow card) 31'; Quioto (yellow card) 31' (goal) 42' (pen.); Lappalainen (yellow card) 72'; Miljevic (yellow card) 82'; Camacho (yellow card) 90+1'; Johnston (yellow card) 90+6'	Stadium: Mercedes-Benz Stadium; Attendance: 42,578; Referee: Chris Penso

April 2 5	FC Cincinnati	3–4	CF Montreal	Cincinnati, Ohio
4:00 PM EDT	Vazquez 12'; Johnston 20' (o.g.); Gaddis (yellow card) 24'; Powell (yellow card) 28'; Acosta 61' (pen.), (yellow card) 90+4'; Blackett (yellow card) 90+1'	Report	Mihailovic 17', 41'; Kamara 45+1'; J. Torres 67'; Waterman (yellow card) 70'; Breza (yellow card) 88'; Wanyama (yellow card) 90+4'	Stadium: TQL Stadium; Attendance: 20,286; Referee: Tori Penso

April 9 6	New York Red Bulls	1–2	CF Montreal	Harrison, New Jersey
4:00 PM EST	Fernandez 14'; Ryan (yellow card) 54'; Long (yellow card) 63'; Edwards (yellow card) 68'; Cásseres Jr. (yellow card) 87'	Report	Wanyama (yellow card) 7'; Koné (yellow card) 45'; Waterman (yellow card) 62'; Camacho 71'; Quioto 81'; Mihailovic (yellow card) 83'	Stadium: Red Bull Arena; Attendance: 16,146; Referee: Drew Fischer

April 16 7	CF Montreal	2–1	Vancouver Whitecaps FC	Montreal, Quebec
3:00 PM EDT	Mihailovic 1'; Johnston (yellow card) 45'; Quioto 47'; Koné (yellow card) 67'; Hamdy (yellow card) 92'	Report	Berhalter (yellow card) 16'; Brown (yellow card) 40'; White 65'; Veselinović (yellow card) 70'; Vite (yellow card) 76'	Stadium: Saputo Stadium; Attendance: 12,042; Referee: Nima Saghafi

April 23 8	Philadelphia Union	1–1	CF Montreal	Chester, Pennsylvania
3:00 PM EDT	Carranza 21' (pen.); Bedoya (yellow card) 55'; Martinez (yellow card) 82'; Wagner (yellow card) 90+1'	Report	Kamara 59'; Waterman (yellow card) 61'; Miller (yellow card) 90'; Bassong (yellow card) 90+3'	Stadium: Subaru Park; Attendance: 18,476; Referee: Lukasz Szpala

April 30 9	CF Montreal	2–1	Atlanta United FC	Montreal, Quebec
4:00 PM EDT	Miller 4'; Camacho (yellow card) 10'; Wanyama (yellow card) 31'; Koné (yellow card) 59'; J. Torres 82'	Report	Moreno 51', (yellow card) 52'; Franco (yellow card) 55'; Ibarra (yellow card) 76'	Stadium: Saputo Stadium; Attendance: 15,060; Referee: Alex Chilowicz

May 7 10	CF Montreal	4–1	Orlando City SC	Montreal, Quebec
4:00 PM EDT	Waterman 21' (yellow card) 24'; Mihailovic (yellow card) 42' (goal) 52'; Quioto (yellow card) 55'; Piette (yellow card) 79'; Torres 81'; Zachary Brault-Guillard 84'	Report	Kara (yellow card) 68'; Moutinho 72'; Williams (yellow card) 89'	Stadium: Saputo Stadium; Attendance: 14,068; Referee: Guido Gonzales Jr.

May 14 11	Charlotte FC	0–2	CF Montreal	Charlotte, North Carolina
7:00 PM EDT	Lindsey (yellow card) 53'; Alcívar (yellow card) 86'; Jóźwiak (yellow card) 90'	Report	Mihailovic 45' (yellow card) 56'; Torres (yellow card) 45+6'; Johnston 67'	Stadium: Bank of America Stadium; Attendance: 33,323; Referee: Silviu Petrescu

May 18 12	Nashville SC	2–1	CF Montreal	Nashville, Tennessee
8:30 PM EDT	Muyl 28' (yellow card) 43'; Mukhtar (yellow card) 41' (goal) 51'	Report	Kamara 55'	Stadium: Geodis Park; Attendance: 26,003; Referee: Jon Freemon

May 22 13	CF Montreal	1–2	Real Salt Lake	Montreal, Quebec
4:00 PM EDT	Mihailovic 1'; Piette (yellow card) 71'	Report	Glad 54' (yellow card) 75'; Córdova 66'; Luiz (yellow card) 90'	Stadium: Saputo Stadium; Attendance: 14,205; Referee: Ramy Touchan

May 28 14	CF Montreal	4–3	FC Cincinnati	Montreal, Quebec
7:30 PM EDT	Waterman 21', (yellow card) 53'; Quioto 45+4', 59' (pen.); Choinière 46'; Camacho (yellow card) 86'; Hamdi (yellow card) 90'	Report	Moreno 12', 63', (yellow card) 89'; Barreal 52'; Acosta (yellow card) 83'	Stadium: Saputo Stadium; Attendance: 14,225; Referee: Fotis Bazakos

June 18 15	CF Montreal	0–1	Austin FC	Montreal, Quebec
7:30 PM EDT		Report	Pereira (yellow card) 6' (yellow-red card) 44'; Urruti (yellow card) 45+1', (goal) 67'; Cascante (yellow card) 48'; Gallagher (yellow card) 60'	Stadium: Saputo Stadium; Attendance: 15,045; Referee: Ted Unkel

June 25 16	CF Montreal	2–1	Charlotte FC	Montreal, Quebec
7:30 PM EDT	Quioto 6'; Choinière 47'; Torres (yellow card) 55'; Camacho (yellow card) 70'; Waterman (yellow card) 79'	Report	Corujo 9', (yellow card) 85'; Hegardt (yellow card) 88'	Stadium: Saputo Stadium; Attendance: 13,520; Referee: Nima Saghafi

June 29 17	Seattle Sounders FC	1–2	CF Montreal	Seattle, Washington
10:00 PM EDT	Morris 3'; Rowe (yellow card) 43'; Ragen (yellow card) 90+4'	Report	Toye 18', 62'; Wanyama (yellow card) 35'; Quioto (yellow card) 90+1'	Stadium: Lumen Field; Attendance: 32,375; Referee: Joseph Dickerson

July 4 18	LA Galaxy	4–0	CF Montreal	Carson, California
10:30 PM EDT	Chicharito 8'; Delgado (yellow card) 27'; Joveljić 45+4'; Raveloson 60' 79'	Report	Piette (yellow card) 38'; Miljevic (yellow card) 90'	Stadium: Dignity Health Sports Park; Attendance: 23,855; Referee: Timothy Ford

July 9 19	CF Montreal	1–2	Sporting Kansas City	Montreal, Quebec
7:30 PM EDT	Quioto 13'; Kwizera (yellow card) 32'	Report	Rosell (yellow card) 27'; Espinoza 29', (yellow card) 61'; Walter 63'; Pierre (yellow card) 77'	Stadium: Saputo Stadium; Attendance: 14,127; Referee: Ismir Pekmic

July 16 20	CF Montreal	1–0	Toronto FC	Montreal, Quebec
7:30 PM EDT	Miller (yellow card) 57' (yellow-red card) 81'; MacNaughton 69' (o.g.); Brault-Guillard (yellow card) 87'	Report	Bradley (yellow card) 46'	Stadium: Saputo Stadium; Attendance: 19,619; Referee: Ted Unkel

July 23 21	D.C. United	1–2	CF Montreal	Washington DC
8:00 PM EDT	Hopkins (yellow card) 45+4'; Odoi-Atsem (yellow card) 49'; Birnbaum 56', (yellow card) 81'	Report	Quioto 1', 35'; Corbo (yellow card) 5'; Johnston (yellow card) 55'	Stadium: Audi Field; Attendance: 15,734; Referee: Rubiel Vazquez

July 30 22	CF Montreal	0–0	New York City FC	Montreal, Quebec
7:30 PM EDT	Johnston (yellow card) 35'; Mihailovic (yellow card) 53'	Report		Stadium: Saputo Stadium; Attendance: 19,619; Referee: Ramy Touchan

August 3 23	Columbus Crew SC	1–2	CF Montreal	Columbus, Ohio
7:30 PM EDT	Zelarayán 14'; Díaz (yellow card) 47'	Report	Waterman (yellow card) 30', (goal) 90+4'; Kamara 88'	Stadium: Lower.com Field; Attendance: 19,010; Referee: Lukasz Szpala

August 6 24	CF Montreal	2–2	Inter Miami CF	Montreal, Quebec
7:30 PM EDT	Quioto 5', 21' (pen.); Waterman (yellow card) 31'	Report	Higuaín 6'; Rodríguez 79'	Stadium: Saputo Stadium; Attendance: 18,007; Referee: Kevin Stott

August 13 25	Houston Dynamo FC	2–3	CF Montreal	Houston, Texas
9:00 PM EDT	Ferreira 12'; Steres 36'; Micael (yellow card) 80'; Carrasquilla (yellow card) 86'	Report	Quioto 15' (pen.), (penalty missed) 45+3', (yellow card) 71'; Johnston 28', (yellow card) 66'; Corbo (yellow card) 63'; Lappalainen 69'	Stadium: PNC Stadium; Attendance: 21,284; Referee: Guido Gonzales, Jr.

August 20 26	CF Montreal	4–0	New England Revolution	Montreal, Quebec
7:30 PM EDT	Kamara 26'; Quioto 39', 55'; Corbo (yellow card) 82'; Miljevic 90+1' (pen.)	Report	Carles Gil (yellow card) 88'	Stadium: Saputo Stadium; Attendance: 19,619; Referee: Chris Penso

August 27 27	Chicago Fire FC	0–2	CF Montreal	Chicago, Illinois
8:00 PM EDT	Terán (yellow card) 22'; Torres (yellow card) 57'	Report	Koné 19' (yellow card) 34' (yellow-red card) 45+3'; Wanyama (yellow card) 45+6'; Mihailovic (yellow card) 59'; Quioto 24'; Breza 62'	Stadium: Soldier Field; Attendance: 13,907; Referee: Michael Radchuk

August 31 28	CF Montreal	0–1	New York Red Bulls	Montreal, Quebec
7:30 PM EDT	Piette (yellow card) 90+5'	Report	Morgan 43'; Harper (yellow card) 64'; Cásseres (yellow card) 90+2'	Stadium: Saputo Stadium; Attendance: 15,075; Referee: Victor Rivas

September 4 29	Toronto FC	3–4	CF Montreal	Toronto, Ontario
7:30 PM EDT	Bernardeschi 5' (pen.), (yellow card) 83'; Insigne 7', 90+3'; Criscito (yellow card) 23'; Laryea (yellow card) 45+4'	Report	Miller 19'; Mihailovic 21'; Kamara 43'; Choinière (yellow card) 45+1'; Johnston 54'; Quioto (yellow card) 74'; Toye (yellow card) 83'	Stadium: BMO Field; Attendance: 28,793; Referee: Allen Chapman

September 9 30	CF Montreal	2–2	Columbus Crew SC	Montreal, Quebec
7:30 PM EDT	Camacho (yellow card) 11'; Waterman (yellow card) 64'; Wanyama 89'; Brault-Guillard 90+4'	Report	Mensah 66'; Zelarayán 68'; Díaz (red card) 76'	Stadium: Saputo Stadium; Attendance: 19,619; Referee: Lukasz Szpala

September 13 31	CF Montreal	3–2	Chicago Fire FC	Montreal, Quebec
7:30 PM EDT	Kamara 21', 29'; Brault-Guillard 45'; Waterman (yellow card) 57'; Camacho (yellow card) 61'; Wanyama (yellow card) 69'	Report	Reynolds (yellow card) 19'; Shaqiri 39' (pen.), 57' (pen.); Sekulić (yellow card) 79'; Terán (yellow card) 84'; Czichos (yellow card) 88'	Stadium: Saputo Stadium; Attendance: 11,535; Referee: Ted Unkel

September 17 32	New England Revolution	0–1	CF Montreal	Foxborough, Massachusetts
7:30 PM EDT		Report	Kamara (yellow card) 56'; Mihailovic (yellow card) 68'; Johnston 72'	Stadium: Gillette Stadium; Attendance: 35,455; Referee: Rosendo Mendoza

October 1 33	CF Montreal	1–0	D.C. United	Montreal, Quebec
7:30 PM EDT	Pines 41' (o.g.)	Report	Hopkins (yellow card) 51'; Pines (red card) 79'; Benteke (yellow card) 90+4'	Stadium: Saputo Stadium; Attendance: 19,619; Referee: Ramy Touchan

October 9 34	Inter Miami CF	1–3	CF Montreal	Fort Lauderdale, FL
2:30 PM EDT	Yedlin (yellow card) 39'; Lowe (yellow card) 40'; Waterman 85' (o.g.)	Report	Miller (yellow card) 2'; Mihailovic 5'; Lappalainen 8'; Piette (yellow card) 25'; Kamara 36'	Stadium: DRV PNK Stadium; Attendance: 15,635; Referee: Joseph Dickerson

=== Tables ===
==== Eastern Conference ====
Pos	Team	Pld	W	L	T	GF	GA	GD	Pts	Qualification
1	Philadelphia Union	34	19	5	10	72	26	+46	67	Qualification for the conference semifinals and the CONCACAF Champions League
2	CF Montréal (Note: Canadian clubs could not qualify for the 2023 CONCACAF Champions League through the MLS regular season or playoffs.)	34	20	9	5	63	50	+13	65	Qualification for the first round
3	New York City FC	34	16	11	7	57	41	+16	55	Qualification for the first round
4	New York Red Bulls	34	15	11	8	50	41	+9	53	Qualification for the first round
5	FC Cincinnati	34	12	9	13	64	56	+8	49	Qualification for the first round

Source: MLS
Rules for classification: 1) points; 2) total wins; 3) total goal differential; 4) total goals scored; 5) fewer disciplinary points; 6) away goal differential; 7) away goals scored; 8) home goals differential; 9) home goals scored; 10) coin toss (2 clubs tied) or drawing of lots (≥3 clubs tied)

==== Overall ====
Pos	Team	Pld	W	L	T	GF	GA	GD	Pts	
1	Los Angeles FC (C, S)	34	21	9	4	66	38	+28	67	Qualification for the CONCACAF Champions League (Note: As MLS Cup 2022 champions and 2022 MLS Supporters' Shield champions (USA1))
2	Philadelphia Union	34	19	5	10	72	26	+46	67	Qualification for the CONCACAF Champions League (Note: As 2022 Eastern Conference regular season champions (USA2))
3	CF Montréal (Note: Canadian clubs could not qualify for the 2023 CONCACAF Champions League through the MLS regular season or playoffs.)	34	20	9	5	63	50	+13	65	
4	Austin FC	34	16	10	8	65	49	+16	56	Qualification for the CONCACAF Champions League (Note: As highest-ranked U.S. based Division I club (based on 2022 MLS regular season record) not already qualified (USA3))
5	New York City FC	34	16	11	7	57	41	+16	55	

Source: MLS
Rules for classification: 1) points; 2) total wins; 3) total goal differential; 4) total goals scored; 5) fewer disciplinary points; 6) away goal differential; 7) away goals scored; 8) home goals differential; 9) home goals scored; 10) coin toss (2 clubs tied) or drawing of lots (≥3 clubs tied)
(C) Champions; (S) Supporters' Shield winners

==== Results summary ====
Overall								Home						Away					
Pld	Pts	W	L	D	GF	GA	GD	W	L	D	GF	GA	GD	W	L	D	GF	GA	GD
34	65	20	9	5	63	50	+13	9	5	3	30	21	+9	11	4	2	33	29	+4

Last updated: October 11, 2022
Source: 2022 Major League Soccer season
Pld = Matches played; Pts = Points; W = Matches won; D = Matches drawn; L = Matches lost; GF = Goals for; GA = Goals against; GD = Goal difference

==== Matches ====
Unless otherwise noted, all times in Eastern Time

== Bracket ==
First round October 15–17	Conference Semifinals; October 20, 23
E1	Philadelphia Union	1
E5	FC Cincinnati	0
E4	New York Red Bulls	1
E5	FC Cincinnati	2
Eastern Conference
E3	New York City FC	3
E6	Inter Miami CF	0
E3	New York City FC	3
E2	CF Montréal	1
E2	CF Montréal	2
E7	Orlando City SC	0
W1	Los Angeles FC	3
W4	LA Galaxy	2
W4	LA Galaxy	1
W5	Nashville SC	0
Western Conference
W3	FC Dallas (p)	1 (5)
W6	Minnesota United FC	1 (4)
W3	FC Dallas	1
W2	Austin FC	2
W2	Austin FC (p)	2 (3)
W7	Real Salt Lake	2 (1)

Conference Finals; October 30
E1	Philadelphia Union	3
E3	New York City FC	1
W1	Los Angeles FC	3
W2	Austin FC	0

MLS Cup; November 5
E1	Philadelphia Union
W1	Los Angeles FC

Note: The higher seeded teams host matches, with the MLS Cup host determined by overall points.

=== Results ===
October 16 First round	CF Montreal	2–0	Orlando City SC	Montreal, Quebec
8:00 PM EDT	Kamara (yellow card) 52'; Koné (yellow card) 60' (goal) 68'; Mihailovic 90+9' (pen.)	Report	Carlos (yellow card) 14'; Angulo (yellow card) 31'; Moutinho (yellow card) 77'; Pereyra (yellow card) 90+2'	Stadium: Saputo Stadium; Attendance: 19,619; Referee: Ismail Elfath

October 23 Conference Semifinals	CF Montreal	1–3	New York City FC	Montreal, Quebec
1:00 PM EDT	Mihailovic 85'	Report	Moralez 6'; Héber 45+3'; Talles Magno 61' (pen.)	Stadium: Saputo Stadium; Attendance: 19,619; Referee: Drew Fischer

== Canadian Championship ==
=== Bracket ===
The draw for the Canadian Championship was streamed live on OneSoccer on March 9, 2022.

Preliminary round May 10–11
Foothills County, AB
CPL	Cavalry FC	2
CPL	FC Edmonton	1
Vancouver, BC
MLS	Vancouver Whitecaps FC	2
CPL	Valour FC	0
Ottawa, ON
CPL	Atlético Ottawa	1 (6)
CPL	York United FC (p)	1 (7)
Guelph, ON
L1O	Guelph United FC	0
CPL	HFX Wanderers FC	2
Hamilton, ON
CPL	Forge FC	2
PLSQ	CS Mont-Royal Outremont	0

Quarter-finals; May 24–25
Foothills County, AB
CPL	Cavalry FC	1 (3)
MLS	Vancouver Whitecaps FC (p)	1 (5)
Langford, BC
CPL	Pacific FC	2 (3)
CPL	York United FC (p)	2 (4)
Halifax, NS
CPL	HFX Wanderers FC	1
MLS	Toronto FC	2
Montreal, QC
MLS	CF Montréal	3
CPL	Forge FC	0

Semi-finals; June 22
Vancouver, BC
MLS	Vancouver Whitecaps FC	2
CPL	York United FC	1
Toronto (BMO), ON
MLS	Toronto FC	4
MLS	CF Montréal	0

Final; July 26
Vancouver, BC
MLS	Vancouver Whitecaps FC	1 (5)
MLS	Toronto FC	1 (3)

=== Canadian Championship results ===
==== Quarter-final ====
May 25	CF Montréal	3–0	Forge FC	Montreal, Quebec
7:00 pm ET	Ibrahim 14', 22', 49'	Report		Stadium: Saputo Stadium; Attendance: 10,107; Referee: Pierre-Luc Lauzière

==== Semi-final ====
June 22	Toronto FC	4–0	CF Montréal	Toronto, Ontario
7:00 pm ET	Akinola 40', 54'; Jiménez 75'; Pozuelo 78'	Report		Stadium: BMO Field; Attendance: 18,133; Referee: Yusri Rudolf

== CONCACAF Champions League ==
=== Bracket ===
Round of 16
(Haitian Football Federation) ~~Cavaly~~	–	–	–
(United States Soccer Federation) New England Revolution	–	–	– (Note: Both matches between Cavaly AS and New England Revolution were cancelled due to the withdrawal of Cavaly AS from the competition. New England Revolution advanced to the quarterfinal round on a walkover. Since the matches were officially declared no contest and not forfeit, only results starting with the quarterfinal round will be considered for seeding purposes in the semifinal and final rounds for matches in which New England participates.)
(Costa Rican Football Federation) Saprissa	2	1	3
(Mexican Football Federation) Pumas UNAM	2	4	6
(Canadian Soccer Association) Forge FC	0	1	1
(Mexican Football Federation) Cruz Azul	1	3	4
(Mexican Football Federation) Santos Laguna	1	0	1
(Canadian Soccer Association) CF Montréal	0	3	3
(National Autonomous Federation of Football of Honduras) Motagua	0	0	0
(United States Soccer Federation) Seattle Sounders FC	0	5	5
(National Football Federation of Guatemala) Guastatoya	0	0	0
(Mexican Football Federation) León	2	1	3
(Costa Rican Football Federation) Santos de Guápiles	0	0	0
(United States Soccer Federation) New York City FC	2	4	6
(National Football Federation of Guatemala) Comunicaciones (p)	1	0	1 (4)
(United States Soccer Federation) Colorado Rapids	0	1	1 (3)

Quarter-finals
(United States Soccer Federation) New England Revolution	3	0	3(3)
(Mexican Football Federation) Pumas UNAM (p)	0	3	3(4)
(Mexican Football Federation) Cruz Azul	1	1	2
(Canadian Soccer Association) CF Montréal	0	1	1
(United States Soccer Federation) Seattle Sounders FC	3	1	4
(Mexican Football Federation) León	0	1	1
(United States Soccer Federation) New York City FC (a)	3	2	5
(National Football Federation of Guatemala) Comunicaciones	1	4	5

Semi-finals
(Mexican Football Federation) Pumas UNAM	2	0	2
(Mexican Football Federation) Cruz Azul	1	0	1
(United States Soccer Federation) Seattle Sounders FC	3	1	4
(United States Soccer Federation) New York City FC	1	1	2

Final
(Mexican Football Federation) Pumas UNAM	2	0	2
(United States Soccer Federation) Seattle Sounders FC	2	3	5

=== Round of 16 ===
February 15 First leg	Santos Laguna (Mexico)	1–0	(Canada) CF Montréal	Torreón, Mexico
10:00 PM EST	Lozano (yellow card) 7'; Ocejo 88'	Report	Quioto (yellow card) 27'; Bassong (yellow card) 80'	Stadium: Estadio Corona; Referee: Oshane Nation

February 22 Second leg	CF Montréal (Canada)	3–0 (3–1 agg.)	(Mexico) Santos Laguna	Montreal, Quebec
8:00 PM EST	Quioto 9' (yellow card) 57'; Mihailovic 22'; Waterman (yellow card) 36'; Miller (yellow card) 51'; Koné 61'; Miljevic (yellow card) 89'	Report	Preciado (yellow card) 36'; Lozano (yellow card) 51'	Stadium: Olympic Stadium; Attendance: 13,343; Referee: Juan Calderón

=== Quarter-finals ===
March 9 First leg	Cruz Azul (Mexico)	1–0	(Canada) CF Montréal	Mexico City, Mexico
10:00 PM EST	Antuna 20'	Report		Stadium: Estadio Azteca; Referee: Daneon Parchment

March 16 Second leg	CF Montréal (Canada)	1–1 (1–2 agg.)	(Mexico) Cruz Azul	Montreal, Quebec
8:00 PM EDT	Camacho 79'; Quioto (yellow card) 82'; Mihailovic (yellow card) 90+2'; Wanyama (yellow card) 90+6'	Report	Aguilar (yellow card) 39'; Antuna 44' (yellow card) 67'; Reynoso (yellow card) 62'; Lira (yellow card) 85'; Jurado (yellow card) 90+4'	Stadium: Olympic Stadium; Attendance: 21,388; Referee: Keylor Herrera

== Statistics ==
=== Appearances, minutes played, and goals scored ===
No.	Nat.	Player	Total			Major League Soccer			Canadian Championship			CONCACAF Champions League			MLS Cup Playoffs			Ref.
No.	Nat.	Player	App.	Min.	Gls	App.	Min.	Gls	App.	Min.	Gls	App.	Min.	Gls	App.	Min.	Gls	Ref.
Goalkeepers
1	(Canada)	Sebastian Breza	27	2430	0	23	2070	0	0	0	0	4	360	0	0	0	0	
25	(United States)	Logan Ketterer	0	0	0	0	0	0	0	0	0	0	0	0	0	0	0	
41	(Canada)	James Pantemis	15	1350	0	11	990	0	2	180	0	0	0	0	2	180	0	
Defenders
3	(Canada)	Kamal Miller	33	2880	2	27	2398	2	0	0	0	4	302	0	2	180	0	
4	(France)	Rudy Camacho	34	2988	2	28	2480	1	1	90	0	3	238	1	2	170	0	
5	(Italy)	Gabriele Corbo	17	1404	0	14	1134	0	2	180	0	1	90	0	0	0	0	
15	(Canada)	Zachary Brault-Guillard	25	857	4	18	619	4	2	104	0	4	123	0	1	11	0	
16	(Canada)	Joel Waterman	36	3168	3	30	2673	3	1	90	0	3	244	0	2	161	0	
19	(Canada)	Zorhan Bassong	14	409	0	10	181	0	2	135	0	2	93	0	0	0	0	
22	(Canada)	Alistair Johnston	39	3113	4	33	2648	4	1	90	0	3	195	0	2	180	0	
26	(Iceland)	Róbert Thorkelsson	15	409	0	11	161	0	2	180	0	2	68	0	0	0	0	
33	(Canada)	Keesean Ferdinand	0	0	0	0	0	0	0	0	0	0	0	0	0	0	0	
Midfielders
2	(Kenya)	Victor Wanyama	38	3176	1	32	2636	1	0	0	0	4	360	0	2	180	0	
6	(Canada)	Samuel Piette	30	1788	0	26	1486	0	2	158	0	0	0	0	2	144	0	
7	(Egypt)	Ahmed Hamdy	11	390	0	9	328	0	2	62	0	0	0	0	0	0	0	
8	(United States)	Djordje Mihailovic	33	2547	12	27	2010	9	0	0	0	4	357	1	2	180	2	
11	(United States)	Matko Miljevic	28	854	1	22	688	1	2	95	0	4	68	0	0	0	0	
18	(Canada)	Rida Zouhir	9	230	0	5	117	0	1	28	0	2	85	0	0	0	0	
28	(Canada)	Ismaël Koné	32	2072	4	26	1587	2	1	90	0	3	236	1	2	159	1	
29	(Canada)	Mathieu Choinière	31	1674	2	26	1384	2	2	107	0	2	173	0	1	10	0	
34	(Canada)	Tomas Giraldo	0	0	0	0	0	0	0	0	0	0	0	0	0	0	0	
36	(Canada)	Nathan Saliba	0	0	0	0	0	0	0	0	0	0	0	0	0	0	0	
Forwards
9	(Norway)	Bjørn Johnsen	0	0	0	0	0	0	0	0	0	0	0	0	0	0	0	
10	(Argentina)	Joaquín Torres	32	1667	3	26	1310	3	1	14	0	4	333	0	1	10	0	
13	(United States)	Mason Toye	20	746	2	18	726	2	0	0	0	0	0	0	2	20	0	
14	(Nigeria)	Sunusi Ibrahim	7	297	3	6	235	0	1	62	3	0	0	0	0	0	0	
17	(Democratic Republic of the Congo)	Jojea Kwizera	11	397	0	8	274	0	2	104	0	0	0	0	1	19	0	
21	(Finland)	Lassi Lappalainen	34	2399	3	28	1942	3	0	0	0	4	296	0	2	161	0	
23	(Sierra Leone)	Kei Kamara	39	1949	9	32	1551	9	2	135	0	3	84	0	2	179	0	
30	(Honduras)	Romell Quioto	35	2421	16	30	2054	15	1	76	0	3	255	1	1	36	0	
No Longer with the Club
Last updated: October 24, 2022

=== Top scorers ===
Rank	Nat.	Player	Pos.	MLS	Canadian Championship	Champions League	MLS Cup Playoffs	TOTAL
1	(Honduras)	Romell Quioto	FW	15		1		16
2	(United States)	Djordje Mihailovic	MF	9		1	2	12
3	(Sierra Leone)	Kei Kamara	FW	9				9
4	(Canada)	Zachary Brault-Guillard	DF	4				4
4	(Canada)	Alistair Johnston	DF	4				4
4	(Canada)	Ismaël Koné	MF	2		1	1	4
7	(Argentina)	Joaquín Torres	FW	3				3
7	(Nigeria)	Sunusi Ibrahim	FW		3			3
7	(Canada)	Joel Waterman	DF	3				3
7	(Finland)	Lassi Lappalainen	FW	3				3
11	(France)	Rudy Camacho	DF	1		1		2
11	(Canada)	Mathieu Choinière	MF	2				2
11	(United States)	Mason Toye	MF	2				2
11	(Canada)	Kamal Miller	DF	2				2
15	(United States)	Matko Miljevic	MF	1				1
15	(Kenya)	Victor Wanyama	MF	1				1
Totals				61	3	4	3	71

Updated to match played October 24, 2022
Italic: denotes player left the club during the season.

=== Top assists ===
Rank	Nat.	Player	Pos.	MLS	Canadian Championship	Champions League	MLS Cup Playoffs	TOTAL
1	(Sierra Leone)	Kei Kamara	FW	7	1			8
1	(Argentina)	Joaquín Torres	FW	7		1		8
1	(United States)	Djordje Mihailovic	MF	6		1	1	8
4	(Finland)	Lassi Lappalainen	FW	7				7
4	(Honduras)	Romell Quioto	FW	6		1		7
6	(Canada)	Alistair Johnston	DF	5				5
6	(Kenya)	Victor Wanyama	MF	5				5
6	(Canada)	Ismaël Koné	MF	5				5
9	(Canada)	Samuel Piette	MF	3		1		4
9	(Canada)	Joel Waterman	DF	4				4
9	(United States)	Matko Miljevic	FW	1	3			4
9	(Canada)	Zachary Brault-Guillard	DF	3			1	4
13	(Canada)	Kamal Miller	DF	3				3
14	(Canada)	Mathieu Choinière	MF	1		1		2
15	(Nigeria)	Sunusi Ibrahim	FW	1				1
15	(Democratic Republic of the Congo)	Jojea Kwizera	FW	1				1
15	(Egypt)	Ahmed Hamdy	MF	1				1
Totals				65	4	4	2	75

Updated to match played October 24, 2022
Italic: denotes player left the club during the season.

=== Goals against average ===
No.	Nat.	Player	Total			Major League Soccer			Canadian Championship			CONCACAF Champions League			MLS Cup Playoffs		
No.	Nat.	Player	MIN	GA	GAA	MIN	GA	GAA	MIN	GA	GAA	MIN	GA	GAA	MIN	GA	GAA
1	CAN	Sebastian Breza	2430	41	1.52	2070	38	1.65	0	0	0.00	360	3	0.75	0	0	0.00
25	USA	Logan Ketterer	0	0	0.00	0	0	0.00	0	0	0.00	0	0	0.00	0	0	0.00
41	CAN	James Pantemis	1350	19	1.27	990	12	1.09	180	4	2.00	0	0	0.00	180	3	1.50

Updated to match played October 24, 2021
Source: CF Montréal
Italic: denotes player left the club during the season.

=== Clean sheets ===
No.	Nat.	Player	MLS	Canadian Championship	CONCACAF Champions League	MLS Cup Playoffs	TOTAL
1	(Canada)	Sebastian Breza	3		1		4
25	(United States)	Logan Ketterer					
41	(Canada)	James Pantemis	4	1		1	6
Totals			7	1	1	1	10

Updated to match played October 17, 2022
Source: MLSsoccer.com
Italic: denotes player left the club during the season.

=== Top minutes played ===
No.	Nat.	Player	Pos.	MLS	Canadian Championship	CONCACAF Champions League	MLS Cup Playoffs	TOTAL
2	(Kenya)	Victor Wanyama	MF	2636		360	180	3176
16	(Canada)	Joel Waterman	DF	2673	90	244	161	3168
22	(Canada)	Alistair Johnston	DF	2648	90	195	180	3113
4	(France)	Rudy Camacho	DF	2480	90	238	170	2988
3	(Canada)	Kamal Miller	DF	2398		212	180	2880
8	(United States)	Djordje Mihailovic	MF	2010		357	180	2547
1	(Canada)	Sebastian Breza	GK	2070		360		2430
30	(Honduras)	Romell Quioto	FW	2054	76	255	36	2421
21	(Finland)	Lassi Lappalainen	FW	1942		296	161	2399
28	(Canada)	Ismaël Koné	MF	1587	90	236	159	2072

Updated to match played October 24, 2022
Source: Montreal Impact
Italic: denotes player left the club during the season.

=== Yellow and red cards ===
No.	Player	Total			Major League Soccer			Canadian Championship			CONCACAF Champions League			MLS Cup Playoffs			Ref.
No.	Player	Yellow card	(yellow card) (red card)	Red card	Yellow card	(yellow card) (red card)	Red card	Yellow card	(yellow card) (red card)	Red card	Yellow card	(yellow card) (red card)	Red card	Yellow card	(yellow card) (red card)	Red card	Ref.
1	Sebastian Breza	2	0	0	2	0	0	0	0	0	0	0	0	0	0	0	
2	Victor Wanyama	9	0	0	8	0	0	0	0	0	1	0	0	0	0	0	
3	Kamal Miller	5	1	0	4	1	0	0	0	0	1	0	0	0	0	0	
4	Rudy Camacho	8	0	0	6	0	0	1	0	0	0	0	0	1	0	0	
5	Gabriele Corbo	3	0	0	3	0	0	0	0	0	0	0	0	0	0	0	
6	Samuel Piette	5	0	0	5	0	0	0	0	0	0	0	0	0	0	0	
7	Ahmed Hamdy	2	0	0	2	0	0	0	0	0	0	0	0	0	0	0	
8	Djordje Mihailovic	8	0	0	6	0	0	0	0	0	1	0	0	1	0	0	
9	Bjørn Johnsen	0	0	0	0	0	0	0	0	0	0	0	0	0	0	0	
10	Joaquín Torres	4	0	0	3	0	0	1	0	0	0	0	0	0	0	0	
11	Matko Miljevic	5	0	0	3	0	0	1	0	0	1	0	0	0	0	0	
13	Mason Toye	1	0	0	1	0	0	0	0	0	0	0	0	0	0	0	
14	Sunusi Ibrahim	0	0	0	0	0	0	0	0	0	0	0	0	0	0	0	
15	Zachary Brault-Guillard	2	0	0	1	0	0	1	0	0	0	0	0	0	0	0	
16	Joel Waterman	13	0	0	11	0	0	0	0	0	1	0	0	1	0	0	
17	Jojea Kwizera	1	0	0	1	0	0	0	0	0	0	0	0	0	0	0	
18	Rida Zouhir	1	0	0	1	0	0	0	0	0	0	0	0	0	0	0	
19	Zorhan Bassong	3	0	0	1	0	0	0	0	0	2	0	0	0	0	0	
21	Lassi Lappalainen	1	0	0	1	0	0	0	0	0	0	0	0	0	0	0	
22	Alistair Johnston	5	0	0	5	0	0	0	0	0	0	0	0	0	0	0	
23	Kei Kamara	2	0	0	1	0	0	0	0	0	0	0	0	1	0	0	
25	Logan Ketterer	0	0	0	0	0	0	0	0	0	0	0	0	0	0	0	
26	Róbert Thorkelsson	0	0	0	0	0	0	0	0	0	0	0	0	0	0	0	
28	Ismaël Koné	7	1	0	6	1	0	0	0	0	0	0	0	1	0	0	
29	Mathieu Choinière	1	0	0	1	0	0	0	0	0	0	0	0	0	0	0	
30	Romell Quioto	8	0	1	5	0	1	0	0	0	3	0	0	0	0	0	
33	Keesean Ferdinand	0	0	0	0	0	0	0	0	0	0	0	0	0	0	0	
34	Tomas Giraldo	0	0	0	0	0	0	0	0	0	0	0	0	0	0	0	
36	Nathan Saliba	0	0	0	0	0	0	0	0	0	0	0	0	0	0	0	
41	James Pantemis	0	0	0	0	0	0	0	0	0	0	0	0	0	0	0	
Totals		95	2	1	79	2	1	4	0	0	10	0	0	2	0	0	
Last updated: October 24, 2022

== Recognition ==
=== MLS All-Star ===
Player	Nation	Position	Report
Miller	Canada	DF	MLS All Star

=== MLS Player of the Week ===
Week	Player	Nation	Position	Report
9	Miller	Canada	DF	MLS Player of the Week: 9

=== MLS team of the Week ===
Week	Player	Nation	Position	Report
4	Koné	Canada	MF	MLS team of the Week: 4
5	Mihailovic	United States	MF	MLS team of the Week: 5
5	Kamara	Sierra Leone	BN	MLS team of the Week: 5
6	Camacho	France	DF	MLS team of the Week: 6
7	Mihailovic	United States	MF	MLS team of the Week: 7
9	Miller	Canada	DF	MLS team of the Week: 9
9	Mihailovic	United States	BN	MLS team of the Week: 9
10	Torres	Argentina	FW	MLS team of the Week: 10
11	Johnston	Canada	DF	MLS team of the Week: 11
11	Breza	Canada	BN	MLS team of the Week: 11
14	Quioto	Honduras	FW	MLS team of the Week: 14
16	Quioto	Honduras	FW	MLS team of the Week: 16
17	Toye	United States	FW	MLS team of the Week: 17
17	Nancy	France	Coach	MLS team of the Week: 17
17	Waterman	Canada	BN	MLS team of the Week: 17
22	Quioto	Honduras	FW	MLS team of the Week: 22
23	Miller	Canada	DF	MLS team of the Week: 23
24	Waterman	Canada	DF	MLS team of the Week: 24
25	Lappalainen	Finland	FW	MLS team of the Week: 25
26	Quioto	Honduras	FW	MLS team of the Week: 26
27	Breza	Canada	GK	MLS team of the Week: 27
29	Mihailovic	United States	MF	MLS team of the Week: 29
29	Kamara	Sierra Leone	FW	MLS team of the Week: 29
30	Wanyama	Kenya	MF	MLS team of the Week: 30
31	Kamara	Sierra Leone	FW	MLS team of the Week: 31
31	Koné	Canada	BN	MLS team of the Week: 31
32	Johnston	Canada	DF	MLS team of the Week: 32
33	Corbo	Italy	DF	MLS team of the Week: 33
34	Mihailovic	United States	MF	MLS team of the Week: 34

=== Concacaf WCQ Matchday Best XI ===
Week	Player	Nation	Position	Report
10	Miller	Canada	DF	Concacaf WCQ Matchday: 10

=== Concacaf Champions League Matchday Best XI ===
Week	Player	Nation	Position	Report
1	Breza	Canada	GK	Concacaf CL Matchday: 1
2	Quioto	Honduras	FW	Concacaf CL Matchday: 2
2	Koné	Canada	MF	Concacaf CL Matchday: 2

=== World Cup 2022 Rosters ===
Nation	Number	Name	Position	Report
Canada	2	Alistair Johnston	DF	Canada Roster
Canada	4	Kamal Miller	DF	Canada Roster
Canada	6	Samuel Piette	MF	Canada Roster
Canada	15	Koné	MF	Canada Roster
Canada	16	James Pantemis	GK	Canada Roster
Canada	26	Joel Waterman	DF	Canada Roster
