= Joaquín Torres (footballer) =

Argentine footballer

Personal information
- Full name: Joaquín Eduardo Torres
- Date of birth: 28 January 1997 (age 29)
- Place of birth: Neuquén, Argentina
- Height: 5 ft 10 in (1.78 m)
- Positions: Attacking midfielder; winger

Team information
- Current team: Vardar
- Number: 99

Youth career
- ACDC Patagonia
- 2010–2015: Newell's Old Boys

Senior career*
Years	Team	Apps	(Gls)
2015–2021	Newell's Old Boys	39	(2)
2019–2020	→ Volos (loan)	24	(5)
2021	→ CF Montréal (loan)	24	(4)
2021–2022	CF Montréal	31	(3)
2023–2024	Philadelphia Union	14	(1)
2024	→ Universidad Católica (loan)	10	(0)
2025–2026	Amazonas	24	(3)
2026–	Vardar	10	(2)
- * Club domestic league appearances and goals as of 18 December 2025

Joaquín Eduardo Torres (born 28 January 1997) is an Argentine professional footballer who plays as a winger for Macedonian First Football League club Vardar.

== Career ==
Torres began his youth career with ACDC Patagonia, prior to signing for Newell's Old Boys in 2010. His senior career started in 2015 with Argentine Primera División side Newell's. He made his professional debut during the 2015 campaign, playing the final twelve minutes of a 2–0 defeat to Belgrano. He made another two appearances in all competitions across 2016, but he didn't feature in the 2016–17 season. In 2017–18, Torres scored his first senior goal in his second start against Olimpo on 16 September. On 26 August 2019, newly promoted Super League Greece side Volos announced the arrival of Torres; a first move abroad.

Torres netted four goals in as many games to start his Volos career, notably scoring a brace over Atromitos on 6 October. Torres scored again on 30 November during a 2–1 away loss against AEL. He returned to Newell's in June 2020, having appeared twenty-seven times for Volos. On 1 February 2021, Torres renewed his contract with Newell's until December 2022. He was immediately loaned out to Major League Soccer with CF Montréal. On 21 October 2021, Montréal exercised their option to make Torres' move permanent.

On 26 January 2023, Torres was traded to Philadelphia Union in exchange for $500,000 in General Allocation Money, with potential for that fee to rise to $800,000. In 2024, he was loaned out to Chilean Primera División side Universidad Católica on a one-year deal.

== Career statistics ==
As of 26 February 2023

Club statistics
Club	Season	League			National Cup		League Cup		Continental		Other		Total	
Club	Season	Division	Apps	Goals	Apps	Goals	Apps	Goals	Apps	Goals	Apps	Goals	Apps	Goals
Newell's Old Boys	2015	Primera División	1	0	0	0	—		—		0	0	1	0
Newell's Old Boys	2016	Primera División	1	0	1	0	—		—		0	0	2	0
Newell's Old Boys	2016–17	Primera División	0	0	0	0	—		—		0	0	0	0
Newell's Old Boys	2017–18	Primera División	27	2	2	1	—		2 (Note: Appearance(s) in the Copa Sudamericana)	0	0	0	31	3
Newell's Old Boys	2018–19	Primera División	10	0	4	1	0	0	—		0	0	14	1
Newell's Old Boys	2019–20	Primera División	0	0	0	0	0	0	—		0	0	0	0
Newell's Old Boys	2020–21	Primera División	0	0	0	0	0	0	—		0	0	0	0
Newell's Old Boys	Total		39	2	7	2	0	0	2	0	0	0	48	4
Volos (loan)	2019–20	Super League Greece	24	5	3	0	—		—		0	0	27	5
CF Montréal (loan)	2021	Major League Soccer	28	4	1	0	—		—		0	0	29	4
CF Montréal	2022	Major League Soccer	28	3	1	0	—		4	0	0	0	33	3
Philadelphia Union	2023	Major League Soccer	1	0	0	0	—		—		0	0	1	0
Career total			63	7	10	2	0	0	2	0	0	0	75	9

== Honours ==
CF Montreal

- Canadian Championship: 2021
