= Alistair Johnston =

Canadian soccer player (born 1998)

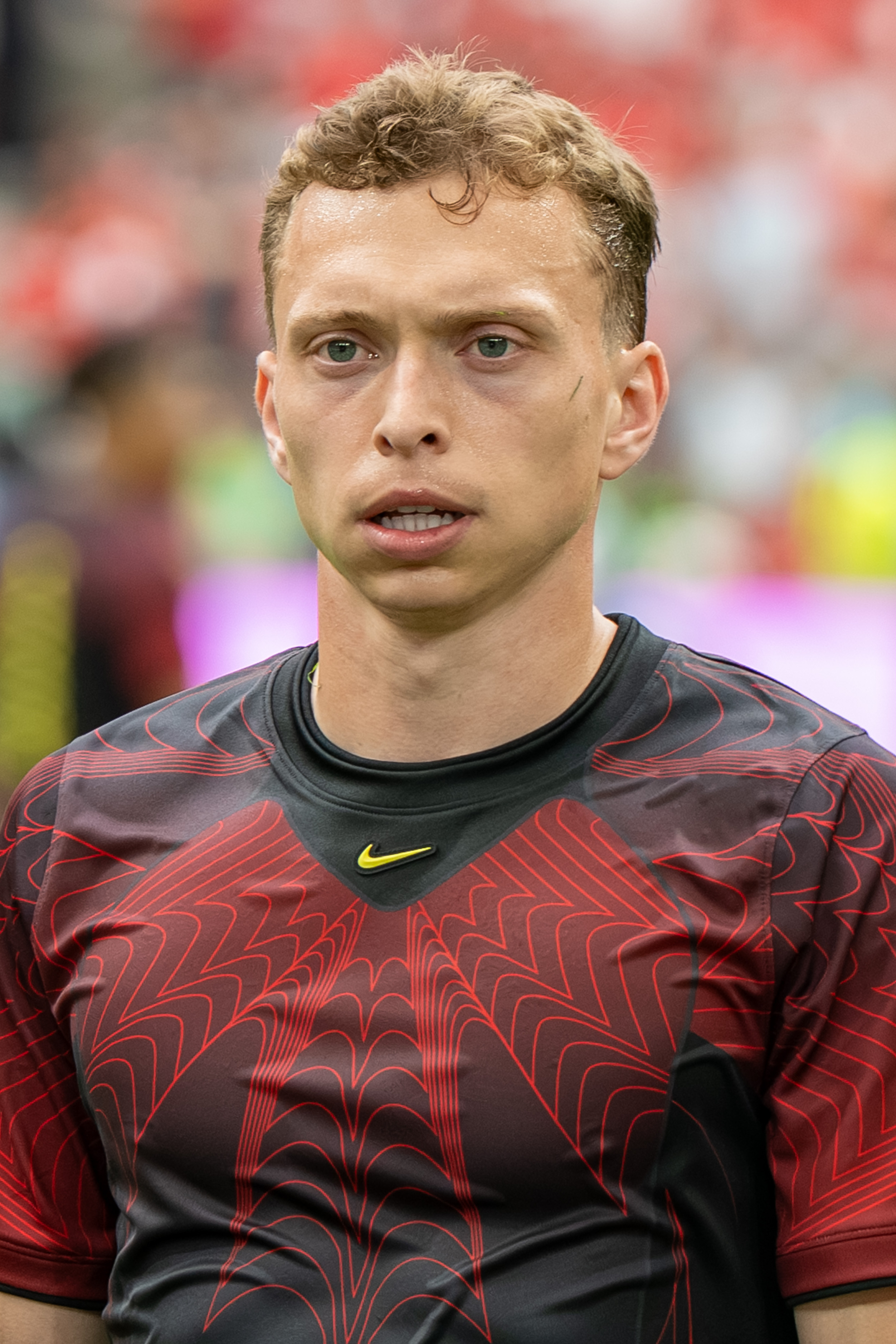
- Johnston with Canada in 2026

Personal information
- Full name: Alistair William Johnston
- Date of birth: October 8, 1998 (age 28)
- Place of birth: Vancouver, British Columbia, Canada
- Height: 1.80 m (5 ft 11 in)
- Position: Right-back

Team information
- Current team: Celtic
- Number: 2

Youth career
- 2002–2005: Lakeshore SC
- 2004–2011: Aurora Youth SC
- 2012: Richmond Hill SC
- 2013–2015: ANB Futbol
- 2015–2019: Vaughan SC

College career
| Years | Team | Apps | (Gls) |
| 2016–2017 | St. John's Red Storm | 36 | (10) |
| 2018–2019 | Wake Forest Demon Deacons | 43 | (6) |

Senior career*
| Years | Team | Apps | (Gls) |
| 2015–2020 | Vaughan Azzurri | 15 | (1) |
| 2020–2021 | Nashville SC | 44 | (1) |
| 2022 | CF Montréal | 33 | (4) |
| 2023– | Celtic | 88 | (6) |

International career^{‡}
| 2021– | Canada | 63 | (1) |
Medal record
Men's soccer
Representing Canada
CONCACAF Nations League
| Runner-up | 2023 United States |
- * Club domestic league appearances and goals as of October 25, 2026 ‡ National team caps and goals as of July 4, 2026

Alistair William Johnston (born October 8, 1998) is a Canadian professional football player who plays as a right-back for Scottish Premiership club Celtic and the Canada national team.

Johnston began his senior career with Vaughan Azzurri. He later had spells with Major League Soccer teams Nashville SC and CF Montréal before signing for Celtic in late 2022. He made his debut for Canada in 2021 and represented the country at the 2022 FIFA World Cup and 2024 Copa América.

== Early life ==
Johnston was born in Vancouver to a Canadian father and an Irish mother from Poleglass. His family moved to Montreal when he was four, where he began playing soccer with Lakeshore SC. The family again moved to Aurora, Ontario when he was seven. There, he played youth soccer with Aurora FC and Richmond Hill SC.

He made his debut in the Canadian youth program at an under-18 camp in 2015, when he was 16. He played youth soccer with ANB Futbol, and earned a tryout with French club Troyes AC while there. In 2015, he joined Vaughan SC, helping them win the 2015 U-18/U-19 Disney Soccer Showcase, the 2015 OYSL U-18 League title, and the 2016 and 2017 U21 Ontario Cup.

== College career ==
Johnston attended St. John's University for two years, before moving to Wake Forest University in 2018 in search of a bigger challenge both in soccer and academically. He switched positions from central midfield to right-back upon joining Wake Forest.

== Club career ==
=== Early career ===
While in college, Johnston returned to Canada to play with League1 Ontario side Vaughan Azzurri from 2015 to 2019 during the college offseason. He played in the 2019 Canadian Championship for Vaughan Azzurri and was sent off in the second leg of the away goals defeat to the HFX Wanderers.

=== Nashville SC ===
On January 9, 2020, Johnston was selected 11th overall by Nashville SC in the 2020 MLS SuperDraft. He officially signed with the club on February 25, 2020. Due to the COVID-19 pandemic, which included Nashville withdrawing from the MLS is Back Tournament due to an outbreak amongst the team, his debut was delayed until August 12 against FC Dallas, coming on as a substitute. He made his first start four days later, also against Dallas. He helped the club reach the MLS Playoffs in their debut season, making 18 appearances.

On September 22, 2021, Johnston scored his first MLS goal in a 5–1 victory over Inter Miami. In December 2021, Nashville announced they were exercising Johnston's contract option, keeping him at the club through the 2022 MLS season.

=== CF Montréal ===
On December 23, 2021, CF Montréal acquired Johnston from Nashville in exchange for $1 million in allocation money, with Nashville also retaining a percentage of a transfer fee in a future sale. Montreal confirmed the deal on December 27 and announced Johnston had also signed a new contract taking him through 2023, with options for 2024 and 2025.

He made his debut for Montreal on February 23, as a substitute against Liga MX side Santos Laguna in the club's second leg of their 2022 CONCACAF Champions League tie. Johnston scored his first goal for Montreal on May 14, the second goal in a 2–0 victory against Charlotte FC.

=== Celtic ===
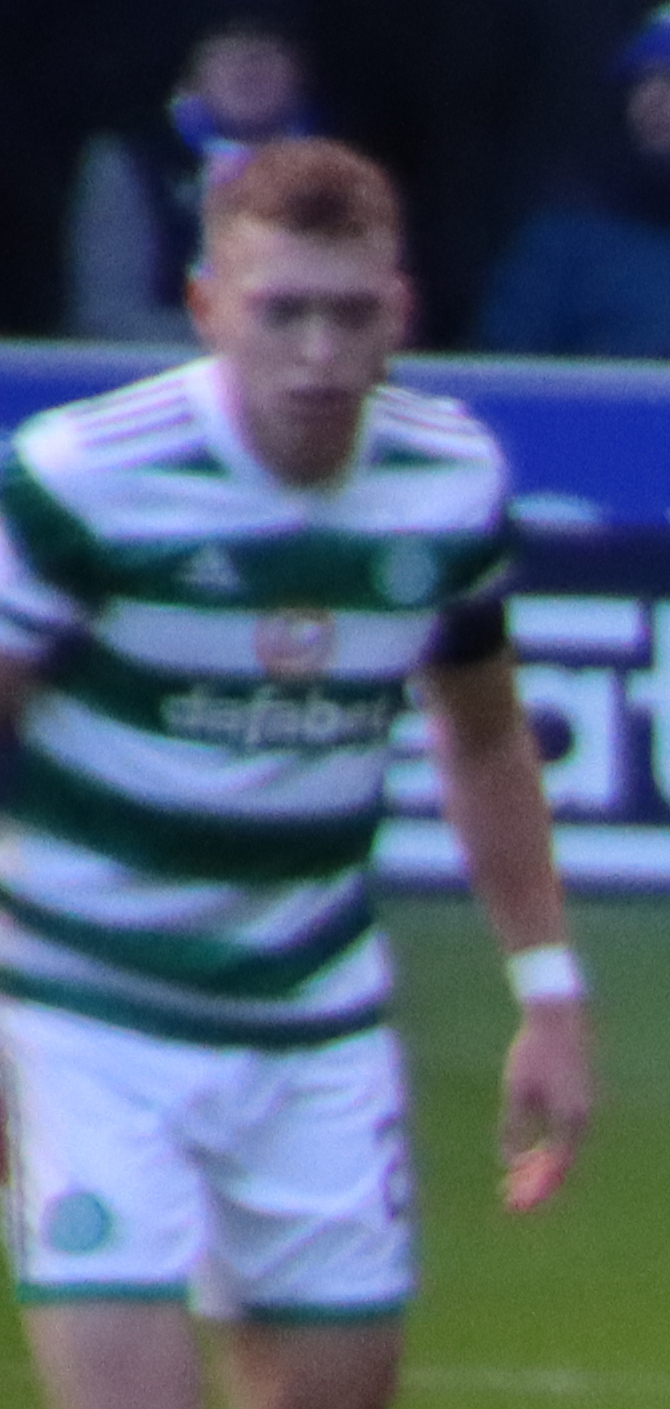
Johnston with Celtic in 2023

In December 2022, CF Montréal announced they had transferred Johnston to Scottish Premiership side Celtic, taking effect January 1, 2023. He signed a 5-year contract with the Glasgow club. Upon the announcement, Johnston stated at a press conference that former Celtic and current CF Montréal midfielder Victor Wanyama was a major influence on his decision to move to the Bhoys.

Johnston made his debut for Celtic on January 2, starting against rivals Rangers and playing the entire match in a 2–2 away draw. He then made his home debut a few days later, starting again in a 2–0 win against Kilmarnock.

On March 5, 2023, Johnston scored his first goal for Celtic in a 5–1 away win against St Mirren. Johnston ended his first season at Celtic Park having helped them to a domestic treble, winning the Premiership, the League Cup and the Scottish Cup. On November 22, 2024, Johnston signed a new five-year contract with Celtic, keeping him at the club until 2029.

== International career ==
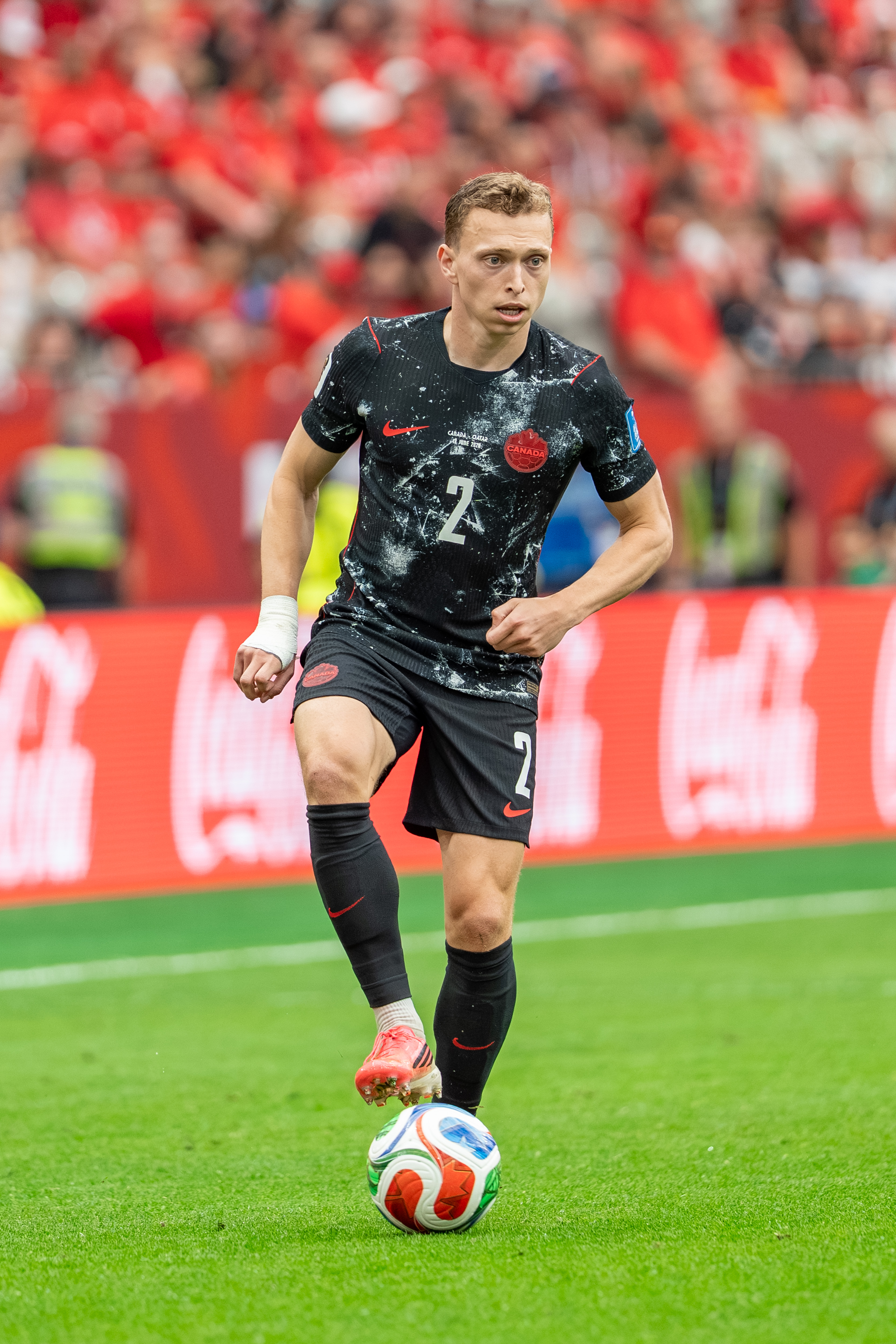
Johnston with Canada at the 2026 FIFA World Cup

Johnston accepted an invitation to the Canada national team camp in January 2021. He made his debut for Canada on March 25, 2021, as a 69th-minute substitute against Bermuda in the first round of 2022 FIFA World Cup qualifying. He scored his first goal for his country in the following match, an 11–0 win against the Cayman Islands, which became the largest victory in the team's history.

In June 2021, Johnston was named to the 60-man preliminary squad for the 2021 CONCACAF Gold Cup, and on July 1 he was named to the final squad.

In November 2022, Johnston was called up to Canada's squad for the 2022 FIFA World Cup, where he played in all three of Canada's matches. In June 2023, he was named to Canada's 23-man squad for the 2023 CONCACAF Nations League Finals.

In June 2024, Johnston was named in Canada's squad for the 2024 Copa América. Following the conclusion of the competition, he was named in the Team of the Tournament, being the only non-South American player included. In July 2025, Johnston was called up to Canada's squad for the 2025 CONCACAF Gold Cup.

In May 2026, Johnston was named to Canada's 26-man squad for the 2026 FIFA World Cup.

== Personal life ==
Johnston's younger brother, Malcolm, is also a football player and was selected in the first round of the 2023 MLS SuperDraft by New York City.

Johnston proposed to his girlfriend in July 2024.

== Career statistics ==
=== Club ===
As of match played October 25, 2026

Appearances and goals by club, season and competition
| Club | Season | League | | | National cup (Note: Includes L1 Cup, Canadian Championship, Scottish Cup) | | League cup (Note: Includes Scottish League Cup) | | Continental | | Other | | Total | |
| Club | Season | Division | Apps | Goals | Apps | Goals | Apps | Goals | Apps | Goals | Apps | Goals | Apps | Goals |
|---|---|---|---|---|---|---|---|---|---|---|---|---|---|---|
| Vaughan Azzurri | 2015 | League1 Ontario | 2 | 0 | — | | — | | — | | — | | 2 | 0 |
| Vaughan Azzurri | 2016 | League1 Ontario | 1 | 0 | 0 | 0 | — | | — | | — | | 1 | 0 |
| Vaughan Azzurri | 2017 | League1 Ontario | 5 | 0 | — | | — | | — | | — | | 5 | 0 |
| Vaughan Azzurri | 2018 | League1 Ontario | 1 | 0 | 0 | 0 | — | | — | | — | | 1 | 0 |
| Vaughan Azzurri | 2019 | League1 Ontario | 6 | 1 | 2 | 0 | — | | — | | — | | 8 | 1 |
| Vaughan Azzurri | Total | | 15 | 1 | 2 | 0 | — | | — | | — | | 17 | 1 |
| Nashville SC | 2020 | Major League Soccer | 18 | 0 | — | | — | | — | | 3 (Note: Appearances in MLS Cup playoffs) | 0 | 21 | 0 |
| Nashville SC | 2021 | Major League Soccer | 26 | 1 | — | | — | | — | | 2 | 0 | 28 | 1 |
| Nashville SC | Total | | 44 | 1 | — | | — | | — | | 5 | 0 | 49 | 1 |
| CF Montréal | 2022 | Major League Soccer | 33 | 4 | 1 | 0 | — | | 3 (Note: Appearances in CONCACAF Champions League) | 0 | 2 | 0 | 39 | 4 |
| Celtic | 2022–23 | Scottish Premiership | 14 | 1 | 5 | 0 | 1 | 0 | — | | — | | 20 | 1 |
| Celtic | 2023–24 | Scottish Premiership | 32 | 1 | 4 | 0 | 0 | 0 | 6 (Note: Appearances in UEFA Champions League) | 0 | — | | 42 | 1 |
| Celtic | 2024–25 | Scottish Premiership | 32 | 4 | 4 | 0 | 3 | 0 | 10 | 0 | — | | 49 | 4 |
| Celtic | 2025–26 | Scottish Premiership | 7 | 0 | 1 | 0 | 1 | 1 | 2 (Note: One appearance in UEFA Champions League, one appearance in UEFA Europa League) | 0 | — | | 11 | 1 |
| Celtic | 2026–27 | Scottish Premiership | 3 | 0 | 0 | 0 | 0 | 0 | 0 | 0 | — | | 3 | 0 |
| Celtic | Total | | 88 | 6 | 14 | 0 | 5 | 1 | 18 | 0 | — | | 125 | 7 |
| Career total | | | 179 | 12 | 17 | 0 | 5 | 1 | 21 | 0 | 7 | 0 | 229 | 13 |

=== International ===
As of match played July 4, 2026

Appearances and goals by national team and year
| National team | Year | Apps | Goals |
|---|---|---|---|
| Canada | 2021 | 18 | 1 |
| Canada | 2022 | 15 | 0 |
| Canada | 2023 | 6 | 0 |
| Canada | 2024 | 12 | 0 |
| Canada | 2025 | 5 | 0 |
| Canada | 2026 | 7 | 0 |
| Total | | 63 | 1 |

As of March 29, 2021
Scores and results list Canada's goal tally first, score column indicates score after each Johnston goal.

List of international goals scored by Alistair Johnston
| No. | Date | Venue | Opponent | Score | Result | Competition |
|---|---|---|---|---|---|---|
| 1 | March 29, 2021 | IMG Academy, Bradenton, United States | Cayman Islands | 6–0 | 11–0 | 2022 FIFA World Cup qualification |

== Honours ==
Celtic

- Scottish Premiership: 2022–23, 2023–24, 2024–25, 2025–26
- Scottish Cup: 2022–23, 2023–24, 2025–26
- Scottish League Cup: 2022–23, 2024–25

Individual

- Copa América Team of the Tournament: 2024
