= Victor Wanyama =

Kenyan footballer (born 1991)

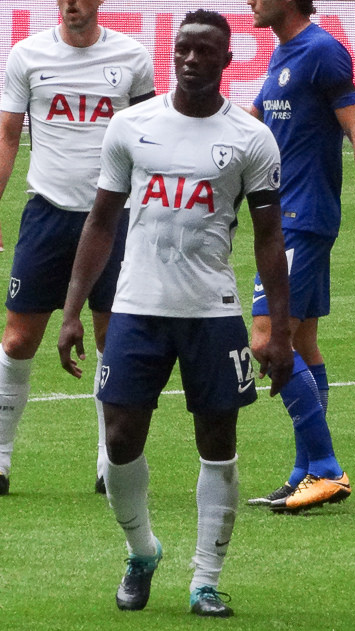
- Wanyama with Tottenham Hotspur in 2017

Personal information
- Full name: Victor Mugubi Wanyama
- Date of birth: 25 June 1991 (age 35)
- Place of birth: Nairobi, Kenya
- Height: 1.88 m (6 ft 2 in)
- Position: Defensive midfielder

Youth career
- 2006–2008: JMJ Youth Academy
- 2006: Nairobi City Stars
- 2006–2007: AFC Leopards
- 2007–2008: Helsingborg

Senior career*
Years	Team	Apps	(Gls)
2008–2011	Beerschot	51	(2)
2011–2013	Celtic	61	(10)
2013–2016	Southampton	85	(4)
2016–2020	Tottenham Hotspur	69	(6)
2020–2024	CF Montréal	117	(5)
2025	Dunfermline Athletic	4	(0)
Total		387	(27)

International career
2007–2020	Kenya	64	(7)
- * Club domestic league appearances and goals

Victor Mugubi Wanyama (Kenyan English: [waˈɲama]; born 25 June 1991) is a Kenyan former professional footballer who played as a defensive midfielder.

Wanyama became the first ever Kenyan player to score in the UEFA Champions League when he scored the first goal in Celtic's 2–1 win over FC Barcelona on 7 November 2012. On 11 July 2013, he moved to Premier League club Southampton for £12.5 million, making him the most expensive player sold by a Scottish club at the time, surpassing the £9.5 million Russian club Spartak Moscow paid for Aiden McGeady in 2010. In summer 2016, Wanyama moved to Southampton's Premier League rivals Tottenham Hotspur, reaching the 2019 UEFA Champions League final with the side, before signing for Major League Soccer club CF Montréal in March 2020. In 2025, Wanyama returned to Scotland to play for Dunfermline Athletic under his former Celtic manager Neil Lennon.

After making his international debut for the Kenya national team in May 2007 at the age of 15, Wanyama went on to earn over 60 caps for the country, and represented them at the 2019 Africa Cup of Nations.

== Early life ==
Wanyama attended Kamukunji High School, known for its successful football team. After High School, he played for JMJ Academy for three years and joined Kenyan Premier League clubs Nairobi City Stars and AFC Leopards. In 2007, he joined Allsvenskan club Helsingborg, but returned to Kenya in 2008 after his brother, McDonald Mariga, moved to Serie A side Parma.

During his childhood, he was a fan of Celtic F.C., and would watch the club's matches from a local club modelled on Celtic called Kibera Celtic.

== Club career ==
=== Beerschot AC ===
After a successful trial, Wanyama signed for Beerschot AC on a four-year contract in summer 2008. He made his debut in a League match at the end of the 2008–09 season. In September 2009, he was fined €100 and given a three-match suspension for a violent tackle on Matías Suárez of Anderlecht.

In the summer of 2010 Scottish Premier League club Celtic attempted to sign Wanyama but Beerschot did not allow him to leave. Russian club CSKA Moscow also attempted to sign him, but they failed as well.

Wanyama scored his first goal for Beerschot on 11 December 2010, a 77th-minute equaliser against Westerlo. In April 2011, he received another three match suspension after video evidence showed he had elbowed Brecht Dejaeghere of K.V. Kortrijk.

=== Celtic ===
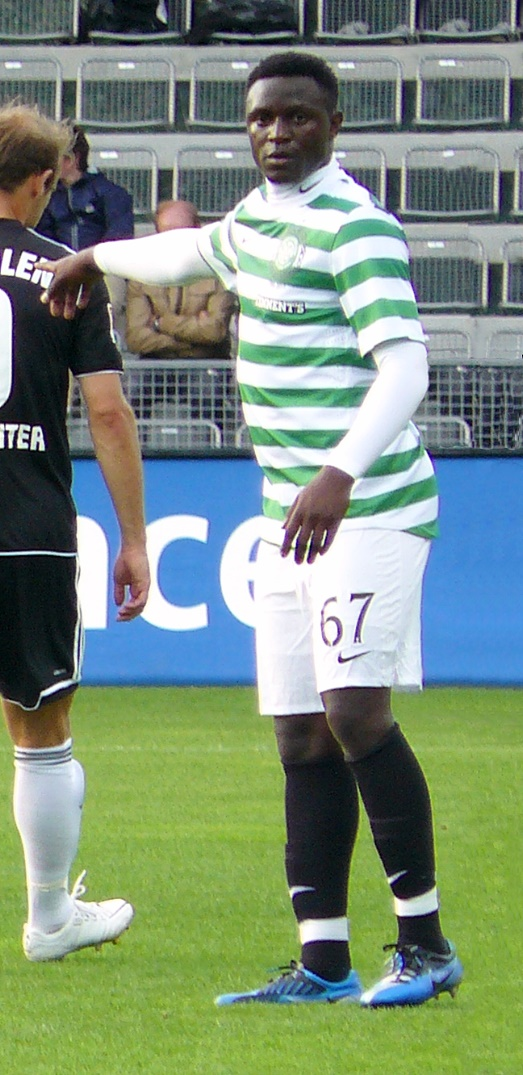
Wanyama playing for Celtic in 2012

On 9 July 2011, Wanyama finally completed a £900,000 move to Celtic, after the Scottish club had failed to sign him the previous year. He signed a four-year contract and in doing so became the first ever Kenyan to play in the SPL. Wanyama chose 67 as his squad number to honour the Lisbon Lions, Celtic's 1967 European Cup-winning team.

Wanyama made his Celtic league debut in a 1–0 loss to St Johnstone on 21 August 2011. He played in central defence rather than his favoured central midfield role. He came on as a late substitute in a 4–0 win over Motherwell, and played for the whole second half in a 2–0 League Cup win over Ross County. On 29 September 2011, he started in Celtic's 1–1 draw with Italian team Udinese in the Europa League. This was his first European match for the club. On 10 December 2011, Wanyama scored his first goal for Celtic in a 1–0 win over Hearts at Celtic Park, a tremendous 25-yard strike which hit the top corner. His performances during December earned him the Scottish Premier League young player of the month award. He scored his second Celtic goal on 2 January 2012 in a 3–0 win against Dunfermline at East End Park. Wanyama scored in Celtic's 2–1 win against Dundee United at Celtic Park and in the 4–0 victory against Hearts at Tynecastle.

On 20 October 2012, Wanyama scored twice against St Mirren at St Mirren Park, the second of which was a half volley from 25 yards out. On 25 October, Wanyama's agent released a statement saying that he had turned down an improved contract offer from Celtic, stating that his wage demands could not be met by the club amid speculation of interest from clubs in England. On 7 November, Wanyama opened the scoring with a powerful header as Celtic shocked Barcelona in the Champions League group stage, by beating them 2–1 at Celtic Park.

Wanyama received a nomination for the PFA Scotland Young Player of the Year for 2012–13, but the winner was announced as Leigh Griffiths

=== Southampton ===
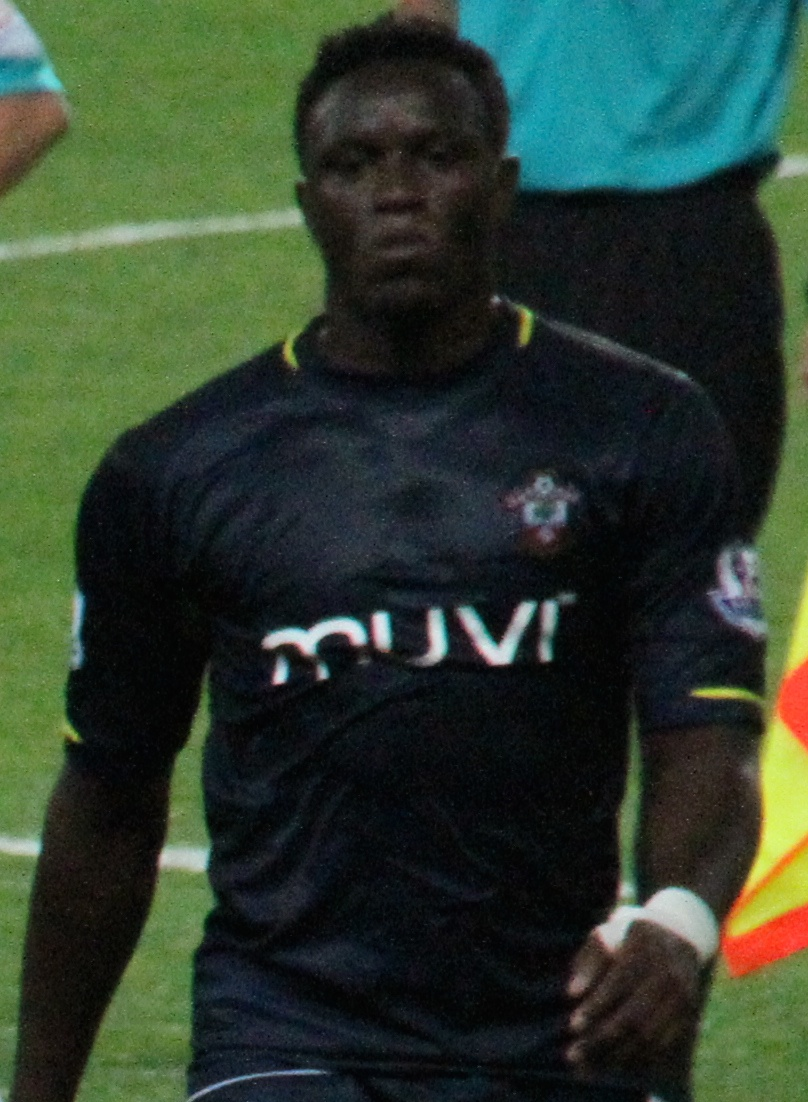
Wanyama with Southampton in 2014

After much speculation and a previous breakdown in talks, on 11 July 2013, Wanyama signed for Premier League side Southampton for a fee claimed to be £12.5 million, making him the first Kenyan to ever play in the Premier League.

Wanyama said:

Southampton is a good club and it has good players, so I just want to train hard and work hard to be a part of the starting XI. We'll see where that will take me. It feels great and I am happy to be here. There were other options, but Southampton is a club with ambitions so I chose to come here. I'm very grateful to be here and I'm looking forward to playing in the Premier League.

He made his debut on 17 August 2013, in a 1–0 away win against West Bromwich Albion. Wanyama made 24 appearances in his first season, but injuries hindered his efforts to make much of an impact in the team.

Under new manager Ronald Koeman, Wanyama came into his own in the 2014–15 season. He scored his first goal for the club in a 1–0 league victory over Swansea City at the Liberty Stadium on 20 September 2014, after replacing James Ward-Prowse in the 69th minute. His next goal came in an 8–0 trouncing of Sunderland on 19 October 2014. Wanyama would score his third goal for the Saints in spectacular fashion, a 40-yard shot after Eldin Jakupović's poor clearance fell straight to him, in what proved to be the only goal in a win over Hull City. His performances saw him awarded the league's African Player of the Month for September, with him stating "It is wonderful being recognised as someone who has done well for his club."

=== Tottenham Hotspur ===
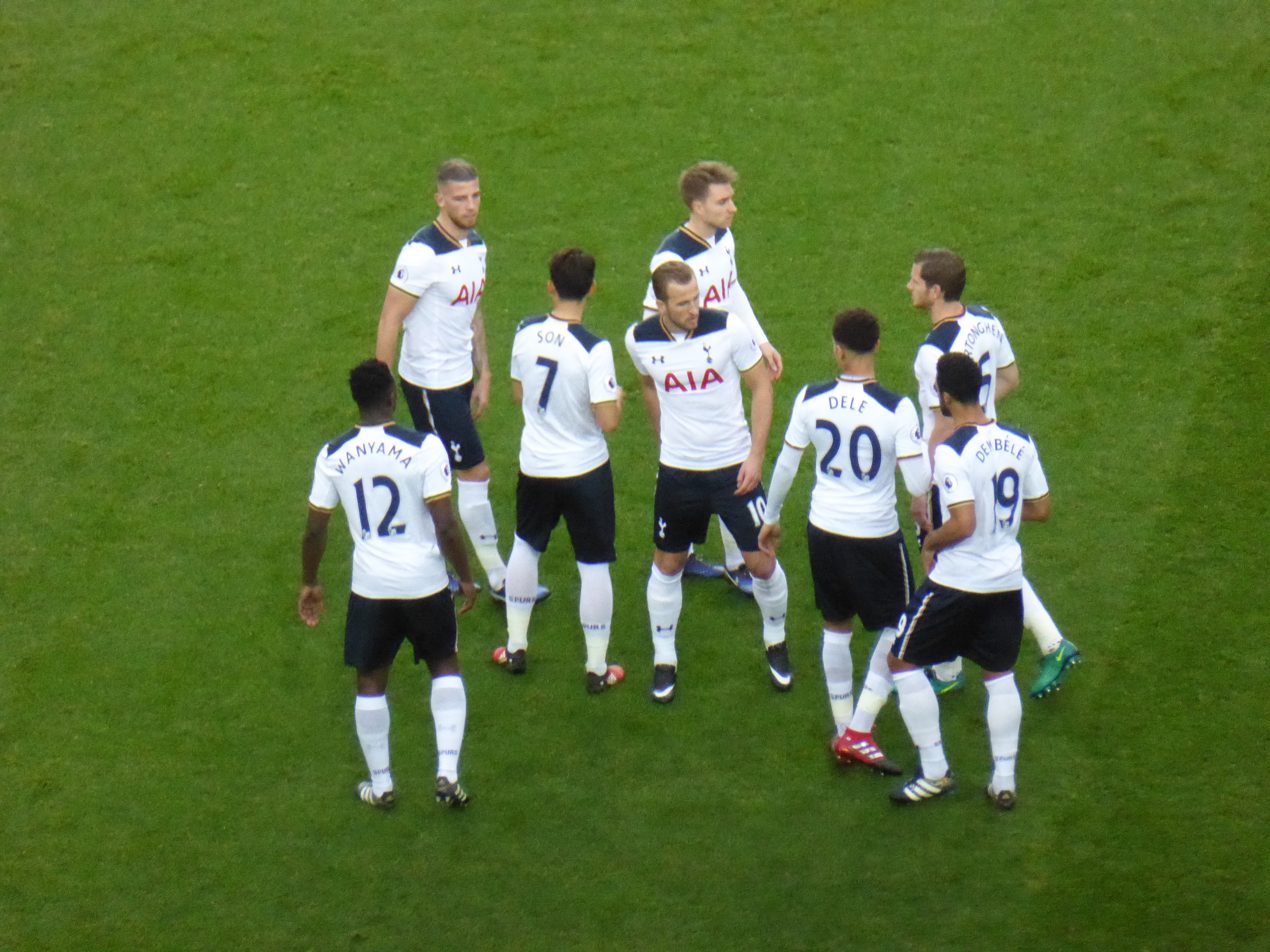
Wanyama (left) alongside Spurs clubmates in a league clash with Manchester United in 2016

On 23 June 2016, Premier League club Tottenham Hotspur announced that they had reached an agreement with Southampton for the transfer of Wanyama, signing a five-year contract for a fee of £11 million. Wanyama had previously worked with Tottenham manager Mauricio Pochettino who brought him to Southampton in July 2013. Wanyama scored his first goal for the club on his home debut against Crystal Palace, in the 82nd minute of a 1–0 league win for Spurs. The goal made him the 138th different player to score for the club, extending its record for the most variety of goalscorers for a single club in the Premier League.

Early in the 2017–18 season, Wanyama injured his knee in the match against Chelsea and was sidelined for over four months. He returned to training in mid-December. On 2 January 2018, he made his first appearance after his injury, as a substitute in the away match against Swansea City. His equaliser in Tottenham's 2–2 draw with Liverpool on 4 February 2018 was voted the Premier League Goal of the Month.

Wanyama picked up a knee injury in a pre-season game of the 2018–19 season against Barcelona. He made his first start of the season two months later in the EFL Cup game against Watford that Spurs won on penalties. At the end of August 2019 Tottenham had agreed to sell Wanyama to Club Brugge for £13 million, however Wanyama had "concerns over the move" and the deal broke down.

=== CF Montréal ===
On 3 March 2020, Tottenham announced that it had agreed to transfer Wanyama to Major League Soccer club Montreal Impact, where he would become a Designated Player.

On 11 March 2020, Wanyama made his competitive debut for Montreal at Stade Olympique in the first leg of a quarterfinal in the CONCACAF Champions League, where he was named in manager Thierry Henry's starting side. Wanyama provided an assist to Saphir Taïder – with whom Wanyama was (despite Saphir not playing a single game for the Saints) briefly teammates at Southampton in 2014 – in a 1–2 defeat by Honduran champions C.D. Olimpia.

On 21 November 2021, the midfielder captained his side to a 1–0 victory over Toronto FC in the 2021 Canadian Championship Final.

In October 2022, Wanyama initially announced that he would not renew his contract with CF Montréal at the end of the season. However, in January 2023, he was officially re-signed by the Canadian club, signing a new two-year contract.

=== Dunfermline Athletic ===
On 26 March 2025, Wanyama joined Scottish Championship club Dunfermline Athletic on a short-term deal until the end of the season, reuniting with his former Celtic manager and new Dunfermline manager Neil Lennon. Three days later, he made his debut in a 3–0 loss against Ayr United where he was sent off in the 84th minute for a handball offence.

On 3 April 2026, Wanyama announced his retirement from professional football.

== International career ==
Wanyama made his debut for the Kenyan senior national team in May 2007, aged just 15, in a friendly against Nigeria. He went on play in all six of Kenya's 2010 FIFA World Cup qualifiers.

Having first become the captain of the Harambee Stars in 2013, he represented Kenya at the 2019 Africa Cup of Nations.

In September 2021, after being repeatedly overlooked for selection during the 2022 FIFA World Cup qualifiers, Wanyama announced his retirement from international football, marking the end of his 14-year duty. However, following the FKF's re-admission in global competitions by FIFA and a personal meeting with Kenya's Sports Minister at the time, Ababu Namwamba, in December 2022 the midfielder officially agreed to restore his eligibility for the senior national team, together with Michael Olunga.

== Personal life ==
Wanyama comes from a sporting family. His brother McDonald Mariga was also a professional footballer, while his other brothers Thomas and Sylvester are also footballers in the Kenyan Premier League. His father, Noah Wanyama, was a footballer for A.F.C. Leopards in the 1980s, and his sister Mercy is a professional basketball player in Spain.

Wanyama is managed by ExtraTime, and has a boot sponsorship deal with Adidas.

In 2015, Wanyama participated in the production of a short film about football in Kenya called Mdudu Boy, written and directed by actress Ella Smith.

In December 2022, Wanyama was key in urging then CF Montréal teammate and friend Alistair Johnston to move to his former club Celtic. Johnston has credited Wanyama with the move, jokingly referring to him as "agent Victor".

== Career statistics ==
=== Club ===
Appearances and goals by club, season and competition
Club	Season	League			National cup		League cup		Continental		Other		Total	
Club	Season	Division	Apps	Goals	Apps	Goals	Apps	Goals	Apps	Goals	Apps	Goals	Apps	Goals
Beerschot AC	2008–09	Belgian First Division	1	0	–		–		–		–		1	0
Beerschot AC	2009–10	Belgian Pro League	20	0	1	0	–		–		–		21	0
Beerschot AC	2010–11	Belgian Pro League	30	2	4	0	–		–		–		34	2
Beerschot AC	Total		51	2	5	0	–		–		–		56	2
Celtic	2011–12	Scottish Premier League	29	4	4	0	4	0	5	0	–		42	4
Celtic	2012–13	Scottish Premier League	32	6	5	1	2	0	10	2	–		49	9
Celtic	Total		61	10	9	1	6	0	15	2	–		91	13
Southampton	2013–14	Premier League	23	0	1	0	0	0	–		–		24	0
Southampton	2014–15	Premier League	32	3	2	0	4	0	–		–		38	3
Southampton	2015–16	Premier League	30	1	0	0	2	0	3	0	–		35	1
Southampton	Total		85	4	3	0	6	0	3	0	–		97	4
Tottenham Hotspur	2016–17	Premier League	36	4	3	0	1	0	7	1	–		47	5
Tottenham Hotspur	2017–18	Premier League	18	1	5	0	0	0	1	0	–		24	1
Tottenham Hotspur	2018–19	Premier League	13	1	1	0	2	0	6	0	–		22	1
Tottenham Hotspur	2019–20	Premier League	2	0	0	0	1	0	1	0	–		4	0
Tottenham Hotspur	Total		69	6	9	0	4	0	15	1	–		97	7
CF Montréal	2020	Major League Soccer	21	2	–		–		2	0	1	0	24	2
CF Montréal	2021	Major League Soccer	27	2	1	0	–		–		–		28	2
CF Montréal	2022	Major League Soccer	32	1	0	0	2	0	4	0	–		38	1
CF Montréal	2023	Major League Soccer	25	0	2	0	–		–		1	0	28	0
CF Montréal	2024	Major League Soccer	12	0	2	1	0	0	–		1	0	15	1
CF Montréal	Total		117	5	5	1	2	0	6	0	3	0	133	6
Dunfermline Athletic	2024–25	Scottish Championship	4	0	–		–		–		–		4	0
Career total			387	27	31	2	18	0	39	4	2	0	478	32

=== International ===
Appearances and goals by national team and year
National team	Year	Apps	Goals
Kenya	2007	1	0
Kenya	2009	7	0
Kenya	2010	1	0
Kenya	2011	8	2
Kenya	2012	5	0
Kenya	2013	4	0
Kenya	2014	6	0
Kenya	2015	8	1
Kenya	2016	8	1
Kenya	2017	2	0
Kenya	2018	3	2
Kenya	2019	9	1
Kenya	2020	2	0
Total		64	7

Kenya score listed first, score column indicates score after each Wanyama goal.

International goals by date, venue, cap, opponent, score, result and competition
No.	Date	Venue	Cap	Opponent	Score	Result	Competition
1	15 November 2011	Nyayo National Stadium, Nairobi, Kenya	18	Seychelles	4–0	4–0	2014 FIFA World Cup qualification
2	7 June 2015	Stade Amahoro, Kigali, Rwanda	34	South Sudan	1–0	2–0	Friendly
3	29 May 2016	Moi International Sports Centre, Kasarani, Kenya	42	Tanzania	1–1	1–1	Friendly
4	24 March 2018	Stade de Marrakech, Marrakesh, Morocco	50	Comoros	1–0	2–2	Friendly
5	14 October 2018	Moi International Sports Centre, Kasarani, Kenya	52	Ethiopia	3–0	3–0	2019 Africa Cup of Nations qualification
6	7 June 2019	Stade Robert Bobin, Bondoufle, France	54	Madagascar	1–0	1–0	Friendly

== Honours ==
Celtic

- Scottish Premier League: 2011–12, 2012–13
- Scottish Cup: 2012–13

Tottenham Hotspur

- UEFA Champions League runner-up: 2018–19

CF Montréal

- Canadian Championship: 2021; runner-up: 2023

Individual

- PFA Scotland Team of the Year (SPL): 2012–13
- SPL Young Player of the Year: 2012–13
- SPL Young Player of the Month: December 2011
