= Mtendere =

Suburb of Lusaka, Zambia

Mtendere, formerly known as Chainama Hills, is a township of Lusaka, Zambia, founded in 1967. The name means "Peace" in the native language.
