= Gustavo García =

Gustavo García may refer to:

- Gustavo García (1980s footballer), Mexican footballer
- Gustavo Enrique García (born 1980), Mexican footballer
- Gustavo C. Garcia (1915–1964), American civil rights attorney
- Gustavo L. Garcia (1934–2018), American politician, mayor of Austin, Texas
- Gustavo Julian Garcia (1972–2016), Texas death row inmate
- Gustavo García (sport shooter) (born 1956), Colombian sports shooter
- Gustavo Garcia (footballer, born 2002), Brazilian footballer

== See also ==
- Gustave García (1837–1925), Italian baritone opera singer and singing teacher
