= The Island F.C. =

Soccer club based in Uniondale, New York

- Interim logo
- Founded: 2025
- Ground: Mitchel Athletic Complex; Uniondale, New York
- Owners: Mitchell Rechler (majority); Peter Zaratin
- Coach: Felipe Martins
- League: MLS Next Pro (men's)
- Website: liprosoccer.com

The Island F.C. is an American professional soccer club based in Uniondale, New York. Majority-owned by Mitchell Rechler, the club plans to commence play in MLS Next Pro, a men's Division 3 league in the United States league system, in the 2027 season. It also plans to field a professional women's team in the future. It will play its home games at a new, soccer-specific stadium to be built at the Mitchel Athletic Complex.

== History ==
The Island F.C. was co-founded in 2025 by Dix Hills native Mitchell Rechler and Glen Cove native Peter Zaratin. Rechler is a managing partner at the private equity firm Rechler Equity Partners, while Zaratin is the owner of the Long Island Rough Riders and its women's team. Rechler and Zaratin met in 2007, and first teamed up for a failed attempt to gain United Soccer League franchise rights for the Rough Riders in 2016, in which the pair would've invested in a public-private partnership to build a multi-purpose stadium at the Suffolk County Community College's campus in Brentwood. The pair would later attempt to forge an affiliation between the Rough Riders and Major League Soccer franchise New York City FC in 2019, which also fell through. Rechler and Zaratin, along with other investors, financed the $25 million launch of The Island F.C. – $20 million of which to be spent on the construction of the club's home ground.

The club's foundation was announced at an October 2025 media event held at the Long Island Children's Museum, attended by local business leaders and politicians. The club plans to commence play in MLS Next Pro, a men's Division 3 league in the United States league system, in the 2027 season. A professional women's team will also be fielded by the club in the future.

== Organization ==
The Island F.C. is co-owned by Mitchell Rechler and Peter Zaratin. Rechler is the club's majority owner, and serves as its chairman, while Zaratin serves as its president.

== Stadium ==
The Island F.C. will play its home games at a soccer-specific stadium to be built at the Mitchel Athletic Complex, in Uniondale, New York. Its $20 million construction cost will be privately funded. The stadium will be opened with a capacity of 2,500, with provisions for a future expansion to 5,000.

== See also ==
- New York Cosmos (2013–2020)
- New York Power (2001–2003)
- Soccer in the New York metropolitan area
- List of New York metropolitan area sports teams
- List of soccer clubs in the United States
