= 2005–06 Parma FC season =

Parma
2005–06 season
- Chairman: Guido Angiolini
- Manager: Mario Beretta
- Serie A: 10th (Pre-Trial); 7th (Post-Trial)
- Coppa Italia: Round of 16
- Top goalscorer: League: Fábio Simplício (10); All: Fábio Simplício (11)
| Home colours | Away colours | Third colours |

During the 2005–06 season, the Italian football club Parma F.C. was placed 7th in the Serie A. The team reached the fourth round of the Coppa Italia.

== Competitions ==
=== Serie A ===
==== League table ====
| Pos | Team | Pld | W | D | L | GF | GA | GD | Pts | Qualification or relegation |
|---|---|---|---|---|---|---|---|---|---|---|
| 5 | Palermo | 38 | 13 | 13 | 12 | 50 | 52 | −2 | 52 | Qualification to UEFA Cup first round |
| 6 | Livorno | 38 | 12 | 13 | 13 | 37 | 44 | −7 | 49 | Qualification to UEFA Cup first round |
| 7 | Parma (Note: Parma gained entry to the 2006–07 UEFA Cup because 2005–06 Coppa Italia finalists Inter and Roma qualified to the 2006–07 UEFA Champions League and 2006–07 UEFA Cup through their respective championship positions. The final positions of Parma and Empoli were decided by head-to-head record.) | 38 | 12 | 9 | 17 | 46 | 60 | −14 | 45 | Qualification to UEFA Cup first round |
| 8 | Empoli | 38 | 13 | 6 | 19 | 47 | 61 | −14 | 45 | |
| 9 | Fiorentina (Note: Milan, Fiorentina and Lazio were docked 30 points, all for involvement in the Calciopoli.) | 38 | 22 | 8 | 8 | 66 | 41 | +25 | 44 | |

Source: 2005–06 Serie A, Soccerway
Rules for classification: 1) points; 2) goal difference; 3) number of goals scored.

==== Results ====
| 28 August 2005 1 | Parma | 1 - 1 | Palermo | Stadio Ennio Tardini, Parma |
| | Bresciano 48' | | Terlizzi 37' |

| 11 September 2005 2 | Chievo | 1 - 0 | Parma | Stadio Marc'Antonio Bentegodi, Verona |
| | Mandelli 11' |

| 17 September 2005 3 | Parma | 1 - 0 | Empoli | Stadio Ennio Tardini, Parma |
| | Corradi 17' |

| 21 September 2005 4 | Roma | 4 - 1 | Parma | Stadio Olimpico, Rome |
| | Totti 24'; Nonda 26', 87'; Panucci 34' | | Cannavaro 30' |

| 24 September 2005 5 | Parma | 1 - 2 | Juventus | Stadio Ennio Tardini, Parma |
| | Delvecchio 14' | | Camoranesi 44'; Vieira 82' |

| 6 October 2005 6 | Ascoli | 3 - 1 | Parma | Stadio Cino e Lillo Del Duca, Ascoli Piceno |
| | Bjelanović 28', 78'; Foggia 33' | | Pisanu 21' |

| 16 October 2005 7 | Parma | 1 - 1 | Treviso | Stadio Ennio Tardini, Parma |
| | Simplício 34' | | Fava 67' |

| 22 October 2005 8 | Fiorentina | 4 - 1 | Parma | Stadio Artemio Franchi, Florence |
| | Toni 2', 24', 60' (pen.); Fiore 36' | | Grella 66' |

| 26 October 2005 9 | Parma | 1 - 1 | Messina | Stadio Ennio Tardini, Parma |
| | Simplício 35' | | Muslimović 77' |

| 30 October 2005 10 | Livorno | 2 - 0 | Parma | Stadio Armando Picchi, Livorno |
| | Lucarelli 16'; Morrone 28' |

| 6 November 2005 11 | Parma | 2 - 0 | Lecce | Stadio Ennio Tardini, Parma |
| | Marchi 31'; Morfeo 50' |

| 20 November 2005 12 | Inter | 2 - 0 | Parma | San Siro, Milan |
| | Figo 68'; Cambiasso 81' |

| 27 November 2005 13 | Parma | 1 - 2 | Udinese | Stadio Ennio Tardini, Parma |
| | Corradi 89' | | Barreto 45+2', 48' |

| 4 December 2005 14 | Reggina | 2 - 1 | Parma | Stadio Oreste Granillo, Reggio Calabria |
| | Cozza 10'; De Rosa 21' | | Cardone 13' |

| 11 December 2005 15 | Parma | 1 - 1 | Sampdoria | Stadio Ennio Tardini, Parma |
| | Corradi 25' | | Bonazzoli 84' |

| 18 December 2005 16 | Siena | 2 - 2 | Parma | Stadio Artemio Franchi, Siena |
| | Locatelli 51'; Chiesa 77' | | Corradi 46'; Dessena 90+4' |

| 21 December 2005 17 | Parma | 1 - 0 | Cagliari | Stadio Ennio Tardini, Parma |
| | Corradi 23' |

| 8 January 2006 18 | Milan | 4 - 3 | Parma | San Siro, Milan |
| | Cardone 27' (o.g.); Gilardino 29'; Kaká 36'; Shevchenko 81' | | Cannavaro 24'; Marchionni 70', 85' |

| 15 January 2006 19 | Parma | 1 - 1 | Lazio | Stadio Ennio Tardini, Parma |
| | Corradi 39' | | Rocchi 6' |

| 18 January 2006 20 | Palermo | 4 - 2 | Parma | Stadio Renzo Barbera, Palermo |
| | Corini 27'; Barzagli 50'; Di Michele 52', 60' | | Simplício 23'; Cannavaro 38' |

| 22 January 2006 21 | Parma | 2 - 1 | Chievo | Stadio Ennio Tardini, Parma |
| | Rossi 45+1'; Simplício 83' (pen.) | | Amauri 26' |

| 29 January 2006 22 | Empoli | 1 - 2 | Parma | Stadio Carlo Castellani, Empoli |
| | Tavano 59' (pen.) | | Marchionni 44'; Bresciano 79' |

| 4 February 2006 23 | Parma | 0 - 3 | Roma | Stadio Ennio Tardini, Parma |
| | | | Mancini 48', 72'; Perrotta 76' |

| 8 February 2006 24 | Juventus | 1 - 1 | Parma | Stadio delle Alpi, Turin |
| | Ibrahimović 44' | | Dessena 39' |

| 12 February 2006 25 | Parma | 0 - 0 | Ascoli | Stadio Ennio Tardini, Parma |

| 19 February 2006 26 | Treviso | 0 - 1 | Parma | Stadio Omobono Tenni, Treviso |
| | | | Simplício 14' |

| 25 February 2006 27 | Parma | 2 - 4 | Fiorentina | Stadio Ennio Tardini, Parma |
| | Simplício 3' (pen.); Bresciano 19' | | Bojinov 35', 39'; Jørgensen 48'; Jiménez 68' |

| 5 March 2006 28 | Messina | 0 - 1 | Parma | Stadio San Filippo, Messina |
| | | | Bresciano 84' |

| 12 March 2006 29 | Parma | 2 - 1 | Livorno | Stadio Ennio Tardini, Parma |
| | Simplício 37' (pen.); Bresciano 81' | | Bakayoko 45+4' (pen.) |

| 19 March 2006 30 | Lecce | 1 - 2 | Parma | Stadio Via del Mare, Lecce |
| | Vučinić 45+5' (pen.) | | Bresciano 52'; Simplício 90+1' |

| 25 March 2006 31 | Parma | 1 - 0 | Inter | Stadio Ennio Tardini, Parma |
| | Simplício 39' |

| 2 April 2006 32 | Udinese | 2 - 0 | Parma | Stadio Friuli, Udine |
| | Di Natale 20'; Felipe 52' |

| 8 April 2006 33 | Parma | 4 - 0 | Reggina | Stadio Ennio Tardini, Parma |
| | Bresciano 12'; Simplício 34'; Contini 66' (pen.); Dessena 79' |

| 15 April 2006 34 | Sampdoria | 1 - 2 | Parma | Stadio Luigi Ferraris, Genoa |
| | Flachi 39' | | Corradi 51' (pen.); Bresciano 90' |

| 22 April 2006 35 | Parma | 1 - 1 | Siena | Stadio Ennio Tardini, Parma |
| | Morfeo 63' | | Guzmán 23' |

| 30 April 2006 36 | Cagliari | 3 - 1 | Parma | Stadio Sant'Elia, Cagliari |
| | Capone 11'; Suazo 31' (pen.); Esposito 63' | | Corradi 74' |

| 7 May 2006 37 | Parma | 2 - 3 | Milan | Stadio Ennio Tardini, Parma |
| | Corradi 54', 88' | | Kaká 29' (pen.); Cafu 43'; Seedorf 56' |

| 14 May 2006 38 | Lazio | 1 - 0 | Parma | Stadio Olimpico, Rome |
| | Rocchi 61' |

=== Coppa Italia ===
| 7 August 2005 First Round | Cavese | 0 - 1 | Parma |
| | | [Report] | Dedić 48' |

| 14 August 2005 Second Round | Padova | 0 - 1 | Parma | Stadio Euganeo, Padova |
| | | [Report] | Dedić 78' |

| 21 August 2005 Third Round | Empoli | 1 - 1 (a.e.t.) (6 – 7 p) | Parma | Stadio Euganeo, Empoli |
| | Gasparetto 22' | [Report] | Simplício 44' (pen.) |
| | Penalties |
| | | | Penalty scored |

| 30 November 2005 Round of 16; 1st Leg | Inter | 1 - 0 | Parma | San Siro, Milan |
| | Martins 73' | [Report] |

| 12 January 2006 Round of 16; 2nd Leg | Parma | 0 - 0 | Inter | Stadio Ennio Tardini, Parma |
| | | [Report] |

Parma lost 1-0 on aggregate.

== Squad statistics ==
=== Top scorers ===
| Place | Position | Nation | Number | Name | Serie A | Coppa Italia | Total |
|---|---|---|---|---|---|---|---|
| 1 | MF | (Brazil) | 30 | Fábio Simplício | 10 | 1 | 11 |
| 2 | FW | (Italy) | 9 | Bernardo Corradi | 10 | 0 | 10 |
| 3 | MF | (Australia) | 23 | Mark Bresciano | 8 | 0 | 8 |
| 4 | MF | (Italy) | 32 | Marco Marchionni | 4 | 0 | 4 |
| 5 | DF | (Italy) | 28 | Paolo Cannavaro | 3 | 0 | 3 |
| 5 | DF | (Italy) | 4 | Daniele Dessena | 3 | 0 | 3 |
| 7 | DF | (Italy) | 10 | Domenico Morfeo | 2 | 0 | 2 |
| 7 | FW | (Slovenia) | 18 | Zlatko Dedić | 0 | 2 | 2 |
| 9 | FW | (Italy) | 36 | Marco Delvecchio | 1 | 0 | 1 |
| 9 | FW | (Italy) | 19 | Andrea Pisanu | 1 | 0 | 1 |
| 9 | MF | (Australia) | 13 | Vince Grella | 1 | 0 | 1 |
| 9 | DF | (Italy) | 3 | Giuseppe Cardone | 1 | 0 | 1 |
| 9 | DF | (Italy) | 14 | Marco Rossi | 1 | 0 | 1 |
| 9 | DF | (Italy) | 17 | Matteo Contini | 1 | 0 | 1 |
| | | | | TOTALS | 46 | 3 | 3 |

== Sources ==
- RSSSF - Italy 2005/06
