= 2008–09 Reggina Calcio season =

Reggina
2008–09 season
- Chairman: Pasquale Foti
- Manager: Nevio Orlandi; Giuseppe Pillon
- Serie A: 19th
- Coppa Italia: Last 16
- Top goalscorer: Bernardo Corradi (10)

Reggina Calcio finally dropped out of Serie A, following seven years of balancing around the drop zone. Following its previous six years, the club had stayed in Serie A by less than three points on all occasions. In 2008–09, Reggina dropped off the pace mid-season and was nowhere near survival.

== Squad ==
=== Goalkeepers ===
- (Italy) Christian Puggioni
- (Italy) Andrea Campagnolo
- (Italy) Pietro Marino

=== Defenders ===
- (Italy) Andrea Costa
- (Italy) Bruno Cirillo
- (Italy) Francesco Cosenza
- (Italy) Antonio Giosa
- (Uruguay) Carlos Valdez
- (Slovakia) Matej Krajčík
- (Uruguay) Pablo Álvarez
- (Brazil) Santos
- (Brazil) Basso
- (Italy) Maurizio Lanzaro

=== Midfielders ===
- (Iceland) Emil Hallfreðsson
- (Italy) Emmanuel Cascione
- (Italy) Luca Vigiani
- (Paraguay) (Italy) Édgar Barreto
- (Italy) Francesco Cozza
- (Italy) Paolo Barillà
- (Italy) Jonis Khoris
- (Italy) Nicolas Viola
- (Italy) Luca Tognozzi
- (Chile) (Spain) Carlos Carmona
- (Italy) Alessio Sestu

=== Attackers ===
- (Italy) Bernardo Corradi
- (Italy) Fabio Ceravolo
- (Serbia) Đorđe Rakić
- (Italy) Franco Brienza
- (Uruguay) (Italy) Cristhian Stuani
- (Italy) Davide Di Gennaro

== Serie A ==
Pos	Team	Pld	W	D	L	GF	GA	GD	Pts	Qualification or relegation
16	Chievo	38	8	14	16	35	49	−14	38	
17	Bologna	38	9	10	19	43	62	−19	37	
18	Torino (R)	38	8	10	20	37	61	−24	34	Relegation to Serie B
19	Reggina (R)	38	6	13	19	30	62	−32	31	Relegation to Serie B
20	Lecce (R)	38	5	15	18	37	67	−30	30	Relegation to Serie B

Source: lega-calcio.it (in Italian)
Rules for classification: 1) points; 2) head-to-head points; 3) head-to-head goal difference; 4) head-to-head goals scored; 5) goal difference; 6) number of goals scored.
(R) Relegated

=== Matches ===
- Chievo-Reggina 2-1
- 0-1 Bernardo Corradi (72 pen)
- 1-1 Michele Marcolini (75 pen)
- 2-1 Vincenzo Italiano (88)
- Reggina-Torino 1-1
- 0-1 Nicola Amoruso (13)
- 1-1 Marco Di Loreto (43 og)
- Roma-Reggina 3-0
- 1-0 Christian Panucci (45)
- 2-0 Alberto Aquilani (50)
- 3-0 Simone Perrotta (90 + 3)
- Reggina-Milan 1-2
- 0-1 Marco Borriello (24)
- 1-1 Bernardo Corradi (75)
- 1-2 Pato (83)
- Palermo-Reggina 1-0
- 1-0 Fabrizio Miccoli (51)
- Reggina-Catania 1-1
- 0-1 Michele Paolucci (69)
- 1-1 Andrea Costa (80)
- Fiorentina-Reggina 3-0
- 1-0 Giampaolo Pazzini (40 pen)
- 2-0 Alberto Gilardino (75)
- 3-0 Alberto Gilardino (81)
- Reggina-Lecce 2-0
- 1-0 Bernardo Corradi (59 pen)
- 2-0 Bernardo Corradi (90 pen)
- Napoli-Reggina 3-0
- 1-0 Germán Denis (8)
- 2-0 Germán Denis (16)
- 3-0 Germán Denis (64)
- Reggina-Inter 2-3
- 0-1 Maicon (9)
- 0-2 Patrick Vieira (24)
- 1-2 Francesco Cozza (34)
- 2-2 Franco Brienza (53)
- 2-3 Iván Córdoba (90 + 1)
- Genoa-Reggina 4-0
- 1-0 Diego Milito (54 pen)
- 2-0 Diego Milito (74)
- 3-0 Giuseppe Sculli (81)
- 4-0 Diego Milito (90)
- Udinese-Reggina 0-1
- 0-1 Franco Brienza (60)
- Reggina-Atalanta 3-1
- 1-0 Francesco Cozza (10)
- 2-0 Bernardo Corradi (21)
- 3-0 Bernardo Corradi (79)
- 3-1 Cristiano Doni (90 + 4)
- Juventus-Reggina 4-0
- 1-0 Mauro Camoranesi (28)
- 2-0 Amauri (44)
- 3-0 Giorgio Chiellini (62)
- 4-0 Alessandro Del Piero (72 pen)
- Reggina-Bologna 2-2
- 1-0 Bernardo Corradi (40)
- 1-1 Francesco Valiani (53)
- 2-1 Édgar Barreto (56)
- 2-2 Marco Di Vaio (61)
- Reggina-Sampdoria 0-2
- 0-1 Claudio Bellucci (75 pen)
- 0-2 Marco Padalino (81)
- Cagliari-Reggina 1-1
- 1-0 Robert Acquafresca (1)
- 1-1 Franco Brienza (61 pen)
- Reggina-Lazio 2-3
- 1-0 Bernardo Corradi (4)
- 1-1 Goran Pandev (14)
- 1-2 Goran Pandev (21)
- 2-2 Francesco Cozza (63)
- 2-3 Goran Pandev (76)
- Siena-Reggina 1-0
- 1-0 Mario Frick (75)
- Reggina-Chievo 0-1
- 0-1 Vincenzo Italiano (90 + 3)
- Torino-Reggina 0-0
- Reggina-Roma 2-2
- 1-0 Bernardo Corradi (43 pen)
- 1-1 David Pizarro (45 + 1)
- 1-2 David Pizarro (57)
- 2-2 Francesco Cozza (81)
- Milan-Reggina 1-1
- 0-1 Davide Di Gennaro (34)
- 1-1 Kaká (67 pen)
- Reggina-Palermo 0-0
- Catania-Reggina 2-0
- 1-0 Ciro Capuano (35)
- 2-0 Alessandro Potenza (74)
- Reggina-Fiorentina 1-1
- 1-0 Alessio Sestu (21)
- 1-1 Emiliano Bonazzoli (23)
- Lecce-Reggina 0-0
- Reggina-Napoli 1-1
- 1-0 Bernardo Corradi (27)
- 1-1 Ezequiel Lavezzi (61)
- Inter-Reggina 3-0
- 1-0 Esteban Cambiasso (6)
- 2-0 Zlatan Ibrahimović (10 pen)
- 3-0 Zlatan Ibrahimović (58)
- Reggina-Genoa 0-1
- 0-1 Thiago Motta (77)
- Reggina-Udinese 0-2
- 0-1 Antonio Floro Flores (85)
- 0-2 Antonio Floro Flores (90 + 1)
- Atalanta-Reggina 0-1
- 0-1 Fabio Ceravolo (40)
- Reggina-Juventus 2-2
- 1-0 Antonino Barillà (27)
- 1-1 Alessandro Del Piero (48 pen)
- 2-1 Emil Hallfreðsson (69)
- 2-2 Cristiano Zanetti (72)
- Bologna-Reggina 1-2
- 0-1 Franco Brienza (40)
- 0-2 Édgar Barreto (46)
- 1-2 Vangelis Moras (87)
- Sampdoria-Reggina 5-0
- 1-0 Daniele Dessena (1)
- 2-0 Daniele Dessena (31)
- 3-0 Gennaro Delvecchio (36)
- 4-0 Guido Marilungo (46)
- 5-0 Giampaolo Pazzini (52)
- Reggina-Cagliari 2-1
- 0-1 Andrea Lazzari (18)
- 1-1 Fabio Ceravolo (26)
- 2-1 Franco Brienza (49)
- Lazio-Reggina 1-0
- 1-0 Mauro Zárate (26)
- Reggina-Siena 1-1
- 1-0 Cristhian Stuani (45 pen)
- 1-1 Massimo Maccarone (76)

=== Topscorers ===
- (Italy) Bernardo Corradi 10
- (Italy) Franco Brienza 5
- (Italy) Francesco Cozza 4
- (Paraguay) Édgar Barreto 2

== Sources ==
- RSSSF - Italy 2008/09
