= 2012 Montreal Impact season =

Montreal Impact
2012 season
- Owner & President: Joey Saputo
- Coach: Jesse Marsch
- Major League Soccer: 12th
- Canadian Championship: Semifinals
- MLS Cup: DNQ
- WDW Pro Soccer Classic: Group stage
- Top goalscorer: League: All: Patrice Bernier (9)
- Highest home attendance: 60,860 v Los Angeles Galaxy (May 12, 2012)
- Lowest home attendance: 12,085 v Sporting Kansas City (July 4, 2012)
- Average home league attendance: 22,772
Home colours	Away colours

The 2012 Montreal Impact season was the club's inaugural season in Major League Soccer, the top flight of both American and Canadian soccer. Including the former club, this was the 19th season of a team under the moniker "Montreal Impact".

For the 2012 season, outside of MLS, the Impact competed in the 2012 Canadian Championship, Canada's domestic cup competition, which determined the Canadian entrant in the CONCACAF Champions League, in which they lost the semi-final.

Jesse Marsch was hired to be the head coach in the club's inaugural season in MLS. Mauro Biello, Preston Burpo and Mike Sorber were hired as assistant coaches for the inaugural season.

== Background ==
Prior to the start of the season, a Division 2 soccer club of the same named played in the North American Soccer League finishing in seventh during the regular season, failing to qualify for the playoffs.

On May 7, 2010, the club's owner, Joey Saputo, was granted a 19th franchise in Major League Soccer, starting in 2012. The MLS franchise will be privately owned by the Saputo family.

On June 14, 2011, the Montreal Impact announced they've reached a five-year agreement with the Bank of Montreal (BMO) to become lead sponsor and jersey sponsor when they join MLS as an expansion team in 2012.

== Review ==
=== October 2011 ===
The building of the Montreal Impact MLS team started on October 3, 2011 with the signing of defensemen Nelson Rivas, who previously played for Inter Milan of the Italian Serie A. The club later awarded MLS contracts to former NASL team defensemen Hassoun Camara, goalkeeper Evan Bush and midfielder Sinisa Ubiparipovic.

=== November 2011 ===
On November 23, 2011, the league held the 2011 MLS Expansion Draft which allowed the Impact to select ten players from their existing club's unprotected list. Brian Ching (from Houston Dynamo), Zarek Valentin (from C.D. Chivas USA), Justin Mapp (from Philadelphia Union), Bobby Burling (from San Jose Earthquakes), Jeb Brovsky (from Vancouver Whitecaps FC), Collen Warner (from Real Salt Lake), Josh Gardner (from Columbus Crew), Sanna Nyassi (from Colorado Rapids), James Riley (from Seattle Sounders FC) and Seth Sinovic (from Sporting Kansas City) were selected by the Montreal team. James Riley was immediately traded to C.D. Chivas USA with allocation money for Justin Braun and Gerson Mayen. Seth Sinovic was later traded with allocation money to Sporting Kansas City for eventual captain Davy Arnaud. The club continued to build by adding defensemen Tyson Wahl, midfielder Bryan Arguez, and goalkeeper Donovan Ricketts.

=== December 2011 ===
The club's roster continued to take shape as the club signed Miguel Montaño who had been loaned to their NASL team by the Seattle Sounders FC, veteran goalkeeper and former Impact Greg Sutton, Quebec native midfielder Patrice Bernier and Brazilian midfielder Felipe.

=== January 2012 ===
The 2012 MLS SuperDraft was held on January 12, 2012. With the first overall pick, the Impact selected Andrew Wenger from Duke University. Defender Calum Mallace was the team's second round choice. The team also added Jamaican defensemen Shavar Thomas to the roster.

=== February 2012 ===
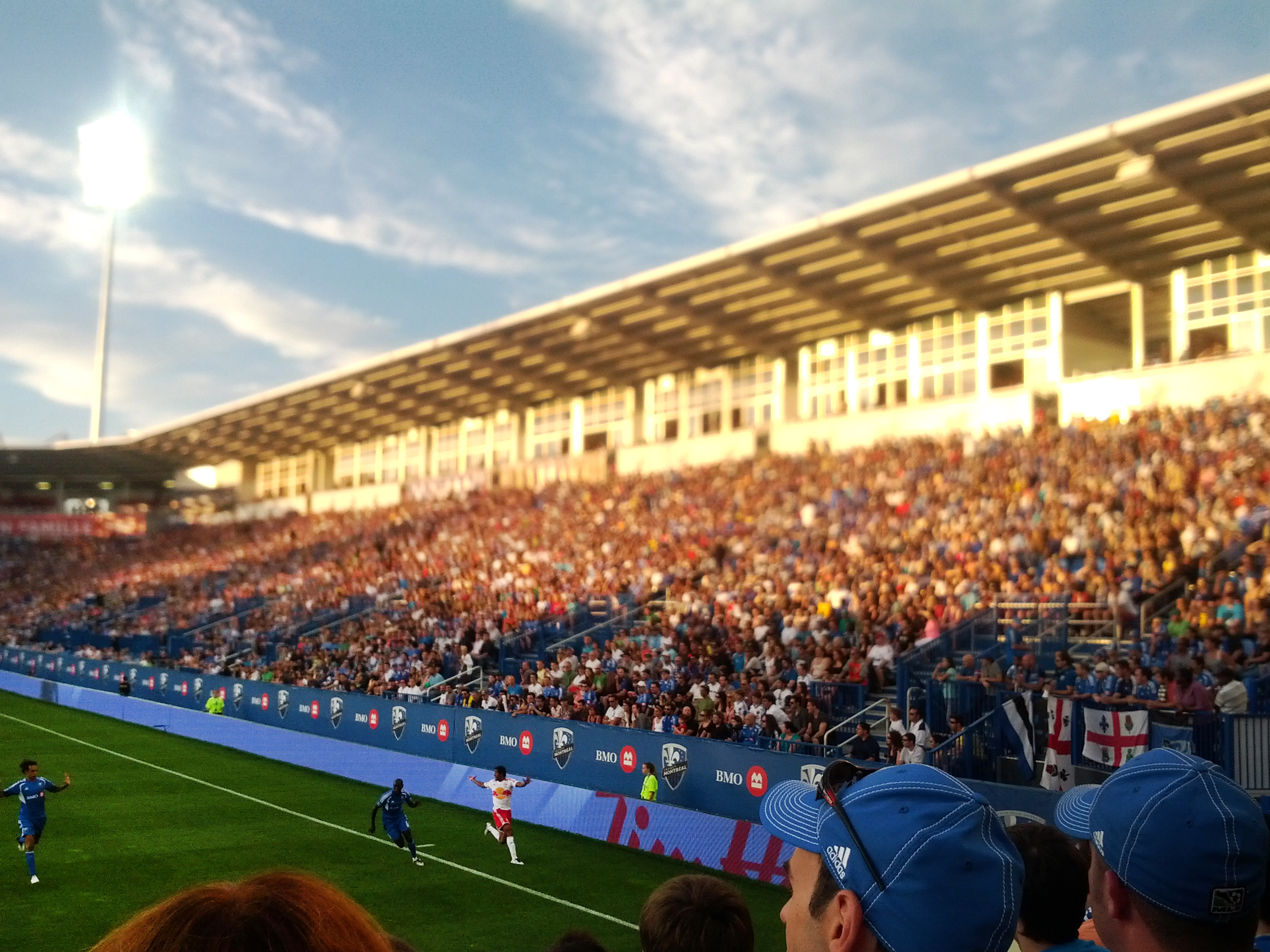
Montreal beat visiting Red Bull New York 3–1 on 28 July 2012.

After a long period of uncertainty regarding his desire to play in Montreal, forward Brian Ching was sent back to Houston Dynamo for a conditional pick in the 2013 MLS SuperDraft. The following day, Impact selected Eddie Johnson via allocation process, but immediately traded him to Seattle Sounders FC for Mike Fucito and Lamar Neagle. After making a good impression in training camp, veteran forward and long time Impact player Eduardo Sebrango was awarded a contract for MLS.

=== March 2012 ===
On March 1, 2012, Italian defender Matteo Ferrari was signed by the club. On March 10, 2012, the Impact played their first-ever MLS game, a 2–0 loss against Vancouver Whitecaps FC. A week later, the team made its home debut at the Olympic Stadium, playing to a 1–1 draw with the Chicago Fire; the match attracted 58,912 spectators, surpassing the previous record for professional soccer in Montreal established in a 1981 Montreal Manic home game (58,542). Former Serie A forward Bernardo Corradi was signed by the club on March 15, 2012 after a successful tryout period.

=== April 2012 ===
The Montreal Impact captured their first ever MLS win on April 7, 2012 against Canadian rival Toronto FC. On April 20, 2012, Mike Fucito was traded to the Portland Timbers for either the Timbers' highest second round pick in the 2013 MLS SuperDraft or a 2013 international roster slot conditional on Fucito's performance.

=== May 2012 ===
On May 12, 2012, the Impact played in front of a crowd of 60,860 spectators during a game against the Los Angeles Galaxy, establishing a record attendance for a professional soccer match in Canada. On May 24, 2012, Montreal Impact announced the signing of their first-ever Designated Player in Italian striker and Serie A veteran Marco Di Vaio.

=== June 2012 ===
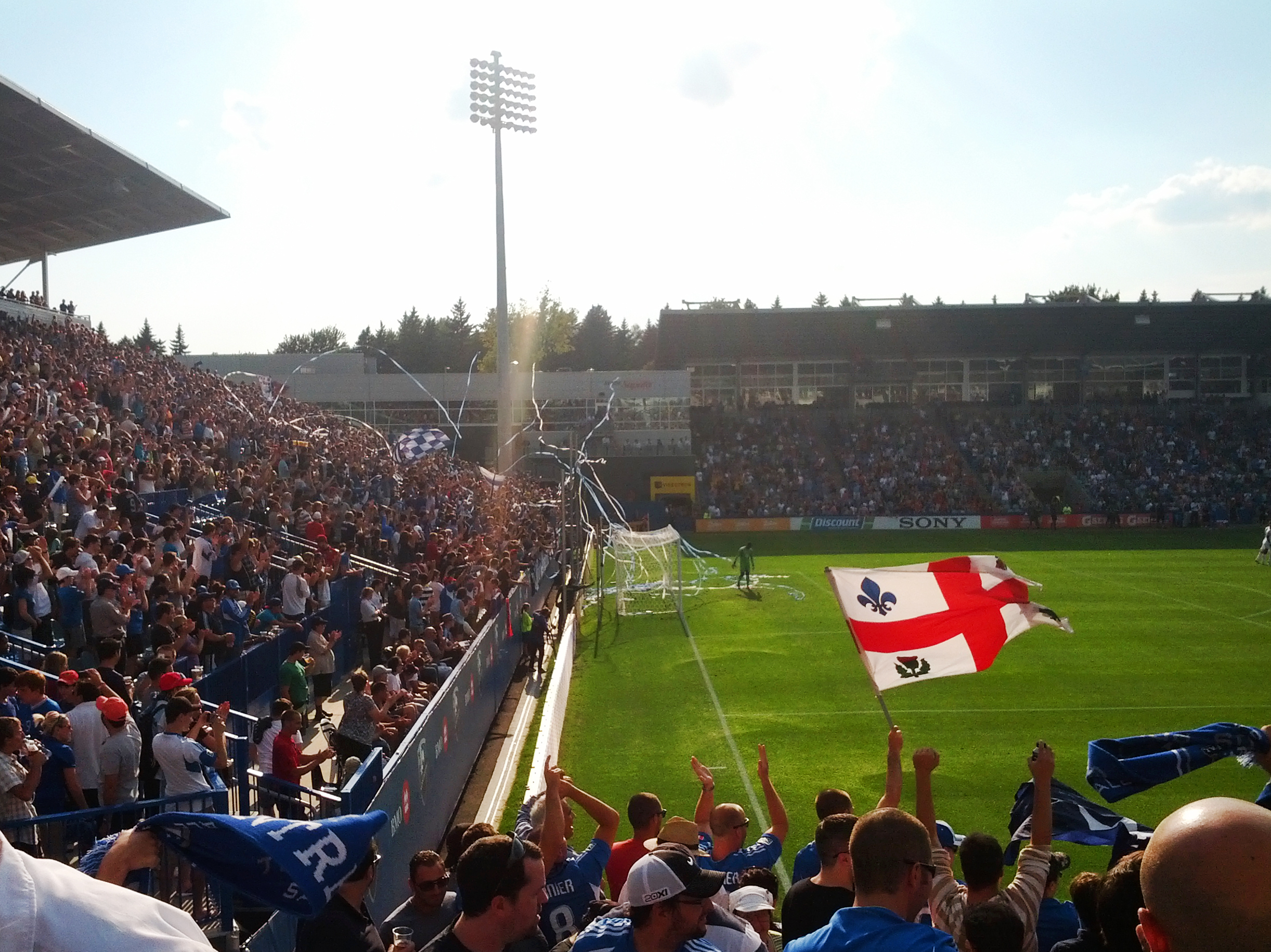
Goal celebration in Montreal against visiting D.C. United on 25 August 2012.

Quebec defender Karl Ouimette became the first player to graduate from the Montreal Impact Academy when he was awarded a contract on June 5, 2012. June 16, 2012 marked the opening of the fully renovated Saputo Stadium. Impact went on to win 4–1 against the Seattle Sounders FC before 17,112 spectators.

=== July 2012 ===
In July, the club added two defensemen in Italian international Alessandro Nesta and Swiss Dennis Iapichino. Justin Braun and Tyson Wahl were traded to Real Salt Lake and Colorado Rapids respectively. Bryan Arguez and Miguel Montaño were sent on loans and Bobby Burling, who was selected in the 2011 MLS Expansion Draft but never signed with the team, was traded to C.D. Chivas USA for an international roster slot.

=== August 2012 ===
On August 7, 2012, Impact swapped goalkeepers with Portland Timbers, sending Donovan Ricketts to Portland for Troy Perkins.

On August 25, the expansion Montreal Impact set the record for most goals scored by an expansion team in MLS in a single season, with their 3–0 win against D.C. United, giving them 42 goals scored, breaking the mark of 40 goals scored by the Portland Timbers in 2011.

== Competitions ==
=== Pre-season matches ===
==== Walt Disney World Pro Soccer Classic ====
February 24, 2012 Group 1	Vancouver Whitecaps FC	3–0	Montreal Impact	Lake Buena Vista, Florida, United States
20:00 UTC−5	Hassli 38'; Mattocks 69'; Le Toux 83' (pen.)	(report)		Stadium: Hess Stadium; Attendance: 21,000

February 26, 2012 Group 2	Montreal Impact	1–1	Sporting Kansas City	Lake Buena Vista, Florida, United States
15:00 UTC−5	Fucito 38'	(report)	Saad 70'	Stadium: Hess Stadium; Attendance: 58,912

February 29, 2012 Group 3	Montreal Impact	1–1	Houston Dynamo	Lake Buena Vista, Florida, United States
20:00 UTC−5	Tyson Wahl (yellow card) 22'; Patrice Bernier 56'; Collen Warner (red card) 88'	(report)	Adam Moffat (yellow card) 20'; Corey Ashe (yellow card) 34'; Andre Hainault (yellow card) 41'; Will Bruin 50'	Stadium: Hess Stadium

==== Other pre-season matches ====
January 22, 2012 Group 1	C.D. Guadalajara	0–0	Montreal Impact	Guadalajara, Mexico
		(report)	Sanna Nyassi (yellow card) 20'

January 24, 2012 Group 2	Estudiantes Tecos	0–1	Montreal Impact	Guadalajara, Mexico
		(report)	Siniša Ubiparipovic (yellow card) 31'; Justin Braun 64'

January 25, 2012 Group 3	ITESO	0–7	Montreal Impact	Guadalajara, Mexico
		Report	Miguel Montaño 14', 65'; Juan José Pena 14'; Reda Agourram 29'; Aaron Schoenfeld 48', 58'; Mircea Ilcu 60'

January 26, 2012 Group 4	Club Atlas	1–1	Montreal Impact	Guadalajara, Mexico
	59'		Collen Warner (yellow card) 42'; Calum Mallace (yellow card) 45'; Sanna Nyassi 57'; Miguel Montaño (yellow card) 70'

February 8, 2012 Group 5	Houston Dynamo	2–0	Montreal Impact	Carson, California, USA
	Colin Clark 67'; Cam Weaver 83'	(Report)		Stadium: The Home Depot Center

February 10, 2012 Group 6	Portland Timbers	0–0	Montreal Impact	Carson, California, USA
	Eric Brunner (yellow card) 60'	(Report)	Josh Gardner (yellow card) 21'; Patrice Bernier (yellow card) 34'	Stadium: The Home Depot Center

February 10, 2012 Group 7	Los Angeles Blues	0–0	Montreal Impact	Carson, California, USA
		(Report)		Stadium: The Home Depot Center

February 14, 2012 Group 8	Los Angeles Galaxy	0–3	Montreal Impact	Carson, California, USA
		(Report)	Sanna Nyassi 37'; Zarek Valentin 51'; Sanna Nyassi (yellow card) 56'; Felipe Campanholi Martins (yellow card) 86'; Evan James 90'	Stadium: The Home Depot Center

February 14, 2012 Group 9	C.D. Chivas USA	1–0	Montreal Impact	Carson, California, USA
	Casey Townsend 2'	(Report)		Stadium: The Home Depot Center

February 17, 2012 Group 10	UCLA Bruins	0–0	Montreal Impact	Carson, California, USA
		(Report)		Stadium: The Home Depot Center

February 17, 2012 Group 11	Ventura County Fusion	1–3	Montreal Impact	Carson, California, USA
	Danny Barrera 83'	(Report)	Felipe 18'; Siniša Ubiparipovic 44'; Steven Miller 64'	Stadium: The Home Depot Center

February 29, 2012 Group 12	United States Men's U-20	1–2	Montreal Impact	Lake Buena Vista, Florida, United States
	30'	(Report)	Eduardo Sebrango 7'; Eduardo Sebrango 10'	Stadium: Hess Stadium

March 3, 2012 Group 13	BK Häcken	0–1	Montreal Impact	Lake Buena Vista, Florida, United States
		(Report)	Eduardo Sebrango 62'	Stadium: Hess Stadium

=== MLS regular season ===
==== Table ====
Eastern Conference Table

Pos	Team	Pld	W	L	T	GF	GA	GD	Pts	Qualification
5	Houston Dynamo	34	14	9	11	48	41	+7	53	Qualification for the knockout round
6	Columbus Crew	34	15	12	7	44	44	0	52	
7	Montreal Impact	34	12	16	6	45	51	−6	42	
8	Philadelphia Union	34	10	18	6	37	45	−8	36	
9	New England Revolution	34	9	17	8	39	44	−5	35	

Source: MLS

Overall Table

Pos	Team	Pld	W	L	T	GF	GA	GD	Pts	
10	Columbus Crew	34	15	12	7	44	44	0	52	
11	Vancouver Whitecaps FC	34	11	13	10	35	41	−6	43	
12	Montreal Impact	34	12	16	6	45	51	−6	42	Qualification for the CONCACAF Champions League
13	FC Dallas	34	9	13	12	42	47	−5	39	
14	Colorado Rapids	34	11	19	4	44	50	−6	37	

Source: MLS
Rules for classification: 1) points; 2) head-to-head record; 3) goal difference; 4) number of goals scored

==== Results summary ====
Overall								Home						Away					
Pld	Pts	W	L	D	GF	GA	GD	W	L	D	GF	GA	GD	W	L	D	GF	GA	GD
34	42	12	16	6	45	51	−6	10	4	3	31	19	+12	2	12	3	14	32	−18

Last updated: October 6, 2012
Source: 2012 Major League Soccer season
Pld = Matches played; Pts = Points; W = Matches won; D = Matches drawn; L = Matches lost; GF = Goals for; GA = Goals against; GD = Goal difference

==== Results by round ====
Round	1	2	3	4	5	6	7	8	9	10	11	12	13	14	15	16	17	18	19	20	21	22	23	24	25	26	27	28	29	30	31	32	33	34
Ground	A	H	A	A	A	H	A	A	H	A	H	H	A	H	A	H	H	A	H	H	A	H	A	H	H	A	H	H	A	A	H	A	A	H
Result	L	D	L	L	L	W	L	D	W	W	D	L	L	W	L	W	L	L	L	W	L	W	L	W	W	W	W	W	L	L	D	D	D	L
Position	8	8	8	8	8	8	8	8	8	8	8	8	8	8	8	8	8	8	8	8	8	6	7	7	6	6	6	6	7	7	7	7	7	7

Updated to match(es) played on October 6, 2012. Source: Regular season matches
A = Away; H = Home; W = Win; D = Draw; L = Loss

=== Match results ===
March 10, 2012 Match 1	Vancouver Whitecaps FC	2–0	Montreal Impact	Vancouver, British Columbia
15:00 UTC−8	Le Toux 4'; Camilo 54'; Bonjour (yellow card) 58'	Report	Felipe (yellow card) 19'; Bernier (yellow card) 28'	Stadium: BC Place; Attendance: 21,000; Referee: Ricardo Salazar

March 17, 2012 Match 2	Montreal Impact	1–1	Chicago Fire	Montreal, Quebec
14:00 UTC−5	Arnaud 56'; Neagle (yellow card) 84'; Nyassi (yellow card) 89'	Report	Grazzini (yellow card) 42'; Oduro 71'; Pardo (yellow card) 87'	Stadium: Olympic Stadium; Attendance: 58,912; Referee: Kevin Stott

March 24, 2012 Match 3	Columbus Crew	2–0	Montreal Impact	Columbus, Ohio
16:00 UTC−5	Mirosevic 30' (pen.); Vargas 66'; Urso (yellow card) 69'; Francis (yellow card) 85'	Report	Brovsky (red card) 19'; Nyassi (yellow card) 29'; Gardner (yellow card) 34'; Warner (yellow card) 52'	Stadium: Columbus Crew Stadium; Attendance: 18,197; Referee: Mark Geiger

March 31, 2012 Match 4	New York Red Bulls	5–2	Montreal Impact	Harrison, New Jersey
16:00 UTC−5	Henry 28', 56', 89'; Cooper 48' (pen.); Ballouchy 72' (yellow card) 77'	Report	Nyassi 18'; Mapp 38'; Corradi (yellow card) 41'	Stadium: Red Bull Arena; Attendance: 13,415; Referee: Michael Kennedy

April 4, 2012 Match 5	Real Salt Lake	1–0	Montreal Impact	Sandy, Utah
21:00 UTC−6	Paulo Jr. 13' (pen.)	Report	Felipe (yellow card) 80'	Stadium: Rio Tinto Stadium; Attendance: 20,191; Referee: Ricardo Salazar

April 7, 2012 Match 6	Montreal Impact	2–1	Toronto FC	Montreal, Quebec
13:00 UTC−5	Ubiparipović 18'; Corradi (yellow card) 26'; Wenger 81'; Nyassi (yellow card) 82'	Report	Eckersley (yellow card) 29'; Harden (yellow card) 47' de Guzman (yellow card) 59'; Emory (red card) 65'; Koevermans 88'	Stadium: Olympic Stadium; Attendance: 23,120; Referee: Hilario Grajeda

April 14, 2012 Match 7	FC Dallas	2–1	Montreal Impact	Frisco, Texas
20:30 UTC−6	Castillo (yellow card) 28'; Perez 77'; Shea 88'	Report	Corradi (yellow card) 18' (goal) 61' (pen.); Felipe (yellow card) 22'; Wahl (yellow card) 46'	Stadium: FC Dallas Stadium; Attendance: 16,164; Referee: Ramon Hernandez

April 18, 2012 Match 8	D.C. United	1–1	Montreal Impact	Washington, D.C.
19:30 UTC−6	Santos 72'; Pontius (yellow card) 79'	Report	Corradi 68'; Wahl (yellow card) 74'	Stadium: RFK Stadium; Attendance: 10,135; Referee: Silviu Petrescu

April 28, 2012 Match 9	Montreal Impact	2–0	Portland Timbers	Montreal, Quebec
14:00 UTC−5	Nyassi (yellow card) 68'; Corradi 76' (pen.); Ubiparipović 84'	Report	Boyd (yellow card) 77'	Stadium: Olympic Stadium; Attendance: 19,223; Referee: Jorge Gonzalez

May 5, 2012 Match 10	Sporting Kansas City	0–2	Montreal Impact	Kansas City, Kansas
20:30 UTC−6	César (yellow card) 35'	Report	Felipe 30'; Rivas (yellow card) 36'; Bernier (yellow card) 45' (goal) 64' (pen.); Ubiparipović (yellow card) 53'; Wahl (yellow card) 77'	Stadium: Livestrong Sporting Park; Attendance: 20,404; Referee: Juan Guzman

May 12, 2012 Match 11	Montreal Impact	1–1	Los Angeles Galaxy	Montreal, Quebec
16:00 UTC−5	Arnaud 8'; Ferrari (yellow card) 46'	Report	Keat (yellow card) 44'; Beckham (yellow card) 54' (goal) 62'; Juninho (yellow card) 57'	Stadium: Olympic Stadium; Attendance: 60,860; Referee: Jason Anno

May 19, 2012 Match 12	Montreal Impact	1–2	New York Red Bulls	Montreal, Quebec
19:30 UTC−5	Corradi 22'; Brovsky (yellow card) 71'	Report	Pálsson (yellow card) 4' (yellow-red card) 58'; Cooper 37'; McCarty (yellow card) 65'; Richards 67'	Stadium: Olympic Stadium; Attendance: 20,373; Referee: Ismail Elfath

May 26, 2012 Match 13	Colorado Rapids	3–2	Montreal Impact	Commerce City, Colorado
19:00 UTC−6	Larentowicz 18'; Moor 39'; Rivero (yellow card) 41'; Marshall (yellow card) 51' (yellow-red card) 61'; Thompson (yellow card) 56'; Castrillon 83'	Report	Bernier 14'; Arnaud (yellow card) 35'; Wenger 48'	Stadium: Dick's Sporting Goods Park; Attendance: 17,877; Referee: Mark Kadlecik

June 16, 2012 Match 14	Montreal Impact	4–1	Seattle Sounders FC	Montreal, Quebec
19:30 UTC−5	Felipe 18'; Mapp 51'; Wenger 58'; Thomas (yellow card) 79'; Rivas (yellow card) 85'; Neagle 87'	Report	Parke (yellow card) 22'; Hurtado (red card) 56'; Johnson 61' (yellow card) 70'; Montero (yellow card) 76'	Stadium: Saputo Stadium; Attendance: 17,112; Referee: Mark Geiger

June 20, 2012 Match 15	C.D. Chivas USA	2–1	Montreal Impact	Carson, California
22:30 UTC−6	Moreno 14'; Romero (yellow card) 16'; Ángel 82'; Agudelo (yellow card) 91'	Report	Felipe 42'; Arnaud (yellow card) 55'	Stadium: The Home Depot Center; Attendance: 10,376; Referee: Allen Chapman

June 23, 2012 Match 16	Montreal Impact	4–2	Houston Dynamo	Montreal, Quebec
19:30 UTC−5	Nyassi 4'; Arnaud 21' (yellow card) 72'; Camara 60'; Bernier 67'; Felipe (yellow card) 90'	Report	Davis 16'; Clark (yellow card) 40'; Bruin 45'; Boswell (yellow card) 68'; Moffat (red card) 73'	Stadium: Saputo Stadium; Attendance: 12,357; Referee: Jose Carlos Rivero

June 27, 2012 Match 17	Montreal Impact	0–3	Toronto FC	Montreal, Quebec
19:30 UTC−5	Camara (yellow card) 27'; Nyassi (yellow card) 85'; Bernier (yellow card) 95+'	Report	Frings 52'; Johnson 72'; Koevermans 78'	Stadium: Saputo Stadium; Attendance: 14,412; Referee: Geoff Gamble

June 30, 2012 Match 18	D.C. United	3–0	Montreal Impact	Washington, D.C.
19:30 UTC−5	Pontius 45'; Russell 50'; Salihi 90'	Report	Warner (yellow card) 48'; Arnaud (yellow card) 84'; Valentin (yellow card) 89'	Stadium: RFK Stadium; Attendance: 18,302; Referee: Paul Ward

July 4, 2012 Match 19	Montreal Impact	1–3	Sporting Kansas City	Montreal, Quebec
19:30 UTC−5	Felipe (yellow card) 36'; Bernier 49'; Warner (yellow card) 67'; Arnaud (yellow card) 69'	Report	Zusi (yellow card) 16' (goal) 75' (pen.); Kamara 57' (pen.); Peterson 82'; Sinovic (yellow card) 90'	Stadium: Saputo Stadium; Attendance: 12,085; Referee: Sorin Stoica

July 8, 2012 Match 20	Montreal Impact	2–1	Columbus Crew	Montreal, Quebec
19:30 UTC5	Nyassi (yellow card) 44'; Warner (yellow card) 68'; Valentin 78'; Bernier 89' (pen.)	Report	Vuković (yellow card) 3'; Tchani (yellow card) 39'; Mirošević 64'; Rentería (yellow card) 68'	Stadium: Saputo Stadium; Attendance: 15,118; Referee: Matthew Foerster

July 14, 2012 Match 21	Philadelphia Union	2–1	Montreal Impact	Chester, Pennsylvania
19:00 UTC−6	McInerney (yellow card) 61'; Pajoy 82'; Valdés 90'	Report	Daniel 89' (o.g.)	Stadium: PPL Park; Attendance: 18,544; Referee: Juan Guzmán

July 18, 2012 Match 22	Montreal Impact	2–1	New England Revolution	Montreal, Quebec
20:00 UTC−5	Bernier 28' (pen.); Nyassi 67'	Report	Nguyen (yellow card) 39' (goal) 44'	Stadium: Saputo Stadium; Attendance: 15,615; Referee: Fotis Bazakos

July 21, 2012 Match 23	Houston Dynamo	3–0	Montreal Impact	Houston, Texas
20:30 UTC−6	Kandji 7', 89' (yellow card) 89'; Boswell 84'	Report	Thomas (yellow card) 67'; Iapichino (yellow card) 74'	Stadium: BBVA Compass Stadium; Attendance: 20,396; Referee: David Gantar

July 28, 2012 Match 24	Montreal Impact	3–1	New York Red Bulls	Montreal, Quebec
19:30 UTC−5	Bernier (yellow card) 27'; Di Vaio 48' (yellow card) 71'; Arnaud 50'; Nyassi 74'	Report	Henry 57' (yellow card) 73'; Miller (yellow card) 71'; McCarty (yellow card) 83'	Stadium: Saputo Stadium; Attendance: 19,441; Referee: Abiodun Okulaja

August 4, 2012 Match 25	Montreal Impact	2–0	Philadelphia Union	Montreal, Quebec
19:30 UTC−5	Wenger 44'; Ferrari (yellow card) 65'; Rivas (red card) 69'; Felipe 78'	Report	Jack McInerney (red card) 69'; Gabriel Gómez (yellow card) 89'	Stadium: Saputo Stadium; Attendance: 18,535; Referee: Ismail Elfath

August 12, 2012 Match 26	New England Revolution	0–1	Montreal Impact	Foxborough, Massachusetts
19:00 UTC−6	Soares (yellow card) 77'	Report	Bernier (yellow card) 7'; Nyassi 61'; Nyassi (yellow card) 86'; Iapichino (yellow card) 89'	Stadium: Gillette Stadium; Attendance: 12,857; Referee: Allen Chapman

August 18, 2012 Match 27	Montreal Impact	3–1	San Jose Earthquakes	Montreal, Quebec
19:30 UTC−5	Camara (red card) 21'; Di Vaio 25'; Neagle 61'; Bernier 72' (pen.)	Report	Lenhart (red card) 21'; Wondolowski 23' (pen.); Beitashour (yellow card) 54'; Hernandez (red card) 71'	Stadium: Saputo Stadium; Attendance: 19,431; Referee: Armando Villarreal

August 25, 2012 Match 28	Montreal Impact	3–0	D.C. United	Montreal, Quebec
14:00 UTC−5	Di Vaio 24'; Bernier 50' (pen.) 92'	Report	McDonald (yellow card) 49'	Stadium: Saputo Stadium; Attendance: 20,011; Referee: Matthew Foerster

September 1, 2012 Match 29	Columbus Crew	2–1	Montreal Impact	Columbus, Ohio
19:30 UTC−5	O'Rourke (yellow card) 18'; Marshall 80'; Rentería 90+3'	Summary	Warner (yellow card) 24'; Di Vaio 73'	Stadium: Columbus Crew Stadium; Attendance: 12,522; Referee: Chris Penso

September 15, 2012 Match 30	Chicago Fire	3–1	Montreal Impact	Bridgeview, Illinois
20:30 UTC−5	MacDonald 34'; Gargan (yellow card) 47'; Alex 61'; Fernandez 80'	Report	Di Vaio 20'	Stadium: Toyota Park; Attendance: 17,691; Referee: Paul Ward

September 22, 2012 Match 31	Montreal Impact	0–0	Sporting Kansas City	Montreal, Quebec
13:00 UTC−5	Warner (yellow card) 55'; Arnaud (yellow card) 77'	Report	César (yellow card) 58'; Peterson (red card) 89'; Joseph (yellow card) 93'	Stadium: Saputo Stadium; Attendance: 20,521; Referee: Jorge Gonzalez

October 6, 2012 Match 32	Houston Dynamo	1–1	Montreal Impact	Houston, Texas
20:30 UTC−6	Bruin 44'		Nyassi (yellow card) 65' (goal) 66'; Ferrari (yellow card) 71'	Stadium: BBVA Compass Stadium; Attendance: 21,178; Referee: Chris Penso

October 20, 2012 Match 33	Toronto FC	0-0	Montreal Impact	Toronto
13:30 UTC−6	Dunfield (yellow card) 39'	report	Arnaud (yellow card) 28'; Camara (yellow card) 73'; Nyassi (yellow card) 87'	Stadium: BMO Field; Attendance: 16151; Referee: Jose Carlos Rivero

October 27, 2012 Match 34	Montreal Impact	0-1	New England Revolution	Montreal, Quebec
14:00 UTC−5		report	Soares (yellow card) 28'	Stadium: Saputo Stadium; Attendance: 19,998; Referee: Jorge Gonzalez

=== Amway Canadian championship ===
Semi-finals

May 2, 2012 Match 1	Montreal Impact	0–0	Toronto FC	Montreal, Quebec, Canada
20:00		Report	Silva (yellow card) 95'	Stadium: Olympic Stadium; Attendance: 13,405; Referee: Paul Ward

May 9, 2012 Match 2	Toronto FC	2–0	Montreal Impact	Toronto, Canada
20:00	Lambe 2'; Eckersley (red card) 16'; Johnson 38'; Cann (yellow card) 41'	Report	Nyassi (yellow card) 23'	Stadium: BMO Field; Attendance: 15,016

=== Regular season friendlies ===
July 24, 2012 Match 1	Montreal Impact	1-1 (4 – 2 p)	Olympique Lyonnais	Montreal, Quebec
19:30	Nesta (yellow card) 22'; Wenger 39'	Report	Pied 28'; Cissokho (yellow card) 87'	Stadium: Saputo Stadium; Attendance: 19,225
	Penalties
	(penalty scored) Cissokho; (penalty scored) Koné; (penalty scored) Fofana; (penalty missed) Briand; (penalty scored) Gomis		(penalty missed) Neagle; (penalty missed) Gardner; (penalty scored) Ubiparipović; (penalty scored) Mallace

November 8, 2012 Match 2	Bologna F.C. 1909	1–0	Montreal Impact	Bologna, Italy
	Paponi 24'	Report		Stadium: Stadio Renato Dall'Ara; Attendance: 1,839

November 13, 2012 Match 3	ACF Fiorentina Primavera	1–4	Montreal Impact	Florence, Italy
	69'	Report	Ilcu 25'; Wenger 27'; Messoudi 55'; Essabr 73'	Stadium: Stadio Artemio Franchi

November 15, 2012 Match 4	ACF Fiorentina	0–1	Montreal Impact	Florence, Italy
		Report	Di Vaio 25'	Stadium: Stadio Artemio Franchi

=== MLS reserves ===
The Montreal Impact will compete in the Eastern Division for the 2012 MLS Reserves season. The division consists of seven teams, including Columbus Crew, D.C. United, New England Revolution, New York Red Bulls, Philadelphia Union and Toronto FC.

==== League table ====
Pos	Club	Pld	W	L	T	GF	GA	GD	Pts
1	Columbus Crew Reserves (C)	10	7	2	1	21	9	+12	22
2	Montreal Impact Reserves	10	7	2	1	19	10	+9	22
3	Philadelphia Union Reserves	10	4	4	2	20	20	0	14
4	New York Red Bulls Reserves	10	3	5	2	14	16	−2	11
5	D.C. United Reserves	9	3	5	1	9	19	-10	10
6	New England Revolution Reserves	10	2	5	3	9	15	−6	9
7	Toronto FC Reserves	9	2	5	2	13	16	−3	8

==== Match results ====
March 24, 2012 Group 1	Columbus Crew	1–2	Montreal Impact	Columbus, Ohio
	Grossman (yellow card) 84'; Perry 89'	(report)	Neagle 23'; Montaño 55'	Stadium: Columbus Crew Stadium

April 1, 2012 Group 2	New York Red Bulls	3–1	Montreal Impact	Montclair, New Jersey
	Ruthven 13'; Arteaga 48'; Angulo (yellow card) 80'; Palsson 87'	(report)	Montaño 30'	Stadium: Montclair State University

April 11, 2012 Group 3	Toronto FC	0–1	Montreal Impact	Toronto
		(report)	Ubiparipović (yellow card) 16'; Ouimette (yellow card) 17'; Fucito 34'	Stadium: Downsview Park

June 2, 2012 Group 4	Montreal Impact	2–2	Toronto FC	Montreal
	Josh Gardner (yellow card) 13'; Ubiparipović 49'; Sebrango 64'; Neagle (yellow card) 83'; Own Goal 92'	(report)	Makubuya 11'; Williams (yellow card) 28'; Hall (yellow card) 56'; Orestano (yellow card) 62'	Stadium: Complexe sportif Claude-Robillard

June 5, 2012 Group 5	Montreal Impact	1–2	New England Revolution	Montreal, Quebec
	Felipe 10'; Arnaud (yellow card) 75'; Montaño (yellow card) 90'	(report)	Purdie 1'; White 51'	Stadium: Complexe sportif Claude-Robillard

August 5, 2012 Group 6	Montreal Impact	5–1	Philadelphia Union	Montreal, Quebec
	Sanna Nyassi 12' 16' 29'; Brovsky (yellow card) 22'; Jackson-Hamel 71' 78'	(report)	Perlaza 15'; Lopez (red card) 63'	Stadium: Complexe sportif Claude-Robillard

August 13, 2012 Group 7	New England Revolution	1–3	Montreal Impact	Foxborough, Massachusetts
	Dimitry Imbongo 45'	(report)	Messoudi 31'; Ubiparipović 42'; Andrew Wenger 61'	Stadium: Gillette Stadium

August 21, 2012 Group 8	Montreal Impact	1–0	New York Red Bulls	Montreal, Quebec
	Lefevre (yellow card) 38'; Rivas (yellow card) 52'; Andrew Wenger 60'	(report)	Perlaza 15'; Lopez (red card) 63'	Stadium: Complexe sportif Claude-Robillard

September 7, 2012 Group 9	Montreal Impact	1–0	D.C. United	Montreal, Quebec
	Mallace 87'	(report)	Chabala (yellow card) 88'	Stadium: Saputo Stadium

September 11, 2012 Group 10	D.C. United	0–2	Montreal Impact	Washington, D.C.
	Chabala (yellow card) 42'	(report)	Mallace 48'; Sebrango 84'	Stadium: DCU training field

== Player information ==
=== Squad information ===
No.	Name	Nationality	Position	Date of birth (age At Year End)	Previous club
Goalkeepers
1	Troy Perkins	(United States)	GK	July 29, 1981 (age 45)	(United States) Portland Timbers
24	Greg Sutton	(Canada)	GK	April 19, 1977 (age 49)	(United States) New York Red Bulls
30	Evan Bush	(United States)	GK	March 6, 1986 (age 40)	(Canada) Montreal Impact (NASL)
Defenders
2	Nelson Rivas	(Colombia)	CB	March 25, 1983 (age 43)	(Italy) Inter Milan
3	Shavar Thomas	(Jamaica)	CB	January 29, 1981 (age 45)	(United States) Sporting Kansas City
6	Hassoun Camara	(France)	CB\RB	February 3, 1984 (age 42)	(Canada) Montreal Impact (NASL)
13	Matteo Ferrari	(Italy)	CB\LB	December 5, 1979 (age 46)	(Turkey) Beşiktaş J.K.
14	Alessandro Nesta	(Italy)	CB	March 19, 1976 (age 50)	(Italy) AC Milan
15	Jeb Brovsky	(United States)	RB	December 3, 1988 (age 37)	(Canada) Vancouver Whitecaps FC
17	Dennis Iapichino	(Switzerland)	LB	July 27, 1990 (age 36)	(Switzerland) FC Lugano
19	Zarek Valentin	(United States)	RB	October 6, 1991 (age 35)	(United States) Chivas USA
29	Calum Mallace	(Scotland)	LB\DM	October 1, 1990 (age 36)	(United States) Marquette Golden Eagles
31	Josh Gardner	(United States)	LB\CM	September 14, 1982 (age 44)	(United States) Columbus Crew
34	Karl Ouimette	(Canada)	CB\LB	June 18, 1992 (age 34)	(Canada) Montreal Impact Academy
Midfielders
7	Felipe Martins	(Brazil)	AM	September 30, 1990 (age 36)	(Switzerland) FC Lugano
8	Patrice Bernier	(Canada)	DM	September 23, 1979 (age 47)	(Denmark) Lyngby Boldklub
11	Sanna Nyassi	(The Gambia)	RM/AM	January 31, 1989 (age 37)	(United States) Colorado Rapids
18	Collen Warner	(United States)	CM/DM	June 24, 1988 (age 38)	(United States) Real Salt Lake
21	Justin Mapp	(United States)	LM/CM	October 18, 1984 (age 42)	(United States) Philadelphia Union
22	Davy Arnaud	(United States)	AM/RM	June 22, 1980 (age 46)	(United States) Sporting Kansas City
25	Lamar Neagle	(United States)	AM	May 7, 1987 (age 39)	(United States) Seattle Sounders FC
27	Bryan Arguez	(United States)	DM/CM	January 13, 1989 (age 37)	(United States) Fort Lauderdale Strikers
28	Siniša Ubiparipović	(Bosnia and Herzegovina)	CM	August 25, 1983 (age 43)	(Canada) Montreal Impact (NASL)
Attackers
9	Marco Di Vaio	(Italy)	ST	July 15, 1976 (age 50)	(Italy) Bologna
16	Eduardo Sebrango	(Cuba)	ST	April 13, 1973 (age 53)	(Canada) Montreal Impact (NASL)
23	Bernardo Corradi	(Italy)	ST	March 30, 1976 (age 50)	(Italy) Udinese Calcio
32	Miguel Montaño	(Colombia)	ST	June 25, 1991 (age 35)	(United States) Seattle Sounders FC
33	Andrew Wenger	(United States)	CB/ST	December 25, 1990 (age 35)	(United States) Duke Blue Devils
36	Evan James	(Canada)	ST	June 19, 1990 (age 36)	(United States) Charlotte 49ers

=== Player transactions ===
==== In ====
No.	Pos.	Player	Transferred from	Fee/notes	Date	Source
2	DF	(Colombia) Nelson Rivas	(Italy) Inter Milan	Free	October 3, 2011	
6	DF	(France) Hassoun Camara	(Canada) Montreal Impact (NASL)	Free	October 11, 2011	
30	GK	(United States) Evan Bush	(Canada) Montreal Impact (NASL)	Free	October 21, 2011	
28	MF	(Bosnia and Herzegovina) Siniša Ubiparipović	(Canada) Montreal Impact (NASL)	Free	November 1, 2011	
19	DF	(United States) Zarek Valentin	(United States) Chivas USA	Expansion Draft	November 23, 2011	
21	MF	(United States) Justin Mapp	(United States) Philadelphia Union	Expansion Draft	November 23, 2011	
15	DF	(United States) Jeb Brovsky	(Canada) Vancouver Whitecaps FC	Expansion Draft	November 23, 2011	
18	MF	(United States) Collen Warner	(United States) Real Salt Lake	Expansion Draft	November 23, 2011	
31	DF	(United States) Josh Gardner	(United States) Columbus Crew	Expansion Draft	November 23, 2011	
11	MF	(The Gambia) Sanna Nyassi	(United States) Colorado Rapids	Expansion Draft	November 23, 2011	
17	FW	(United States) Justin Braun	(United States) Chivas USA	Acquired with Gerson Mayen for James Riley	November 23, 2011	
5	DF	(United States) Tyson Wahl	(United States) Seattle Sounders FC	Acquired for allocation money	November 23, 2011	
27	MF	(United States) Bryan Arguez	(United States) Fort Lauderdale Strikers	Free	November 25, 2011	
22	MF	(United States) Davy Arnaud	(United States) Sporting Kansas City	Acquired for Seth Sinovic and allocation money	November 28, 2011	
1	GK	(Jamaica) Donovan Ricketts	(United States) Los Angeles Galaxy	Acquired for allocation money	November 28, 2011	
32	FW	(Colombia) Miguel Montaño	(United States) Seattle Sounders FC	Free	December 7, 2011	
24	GK	(Canada) Greg Sutton	(United States) New York Red Bulls	Free	December 9, 2011	
8	MF	(Canada) Patrice Bernier	(Denmark) Lyngby Boldklub	Free	December 19, 2011	
7	MF	(Brazil) Felipe	(Switzerland) FC Lugano	Free	December 21, 2011	
33	FW	(United States) Andrew Wenger	(United States) Duke Blue Devils	2012 MLS SuperDraft	January 12, 2012	
3	DF	(Jamaica) Shavar Thomas	(United States) Sporting Kansas City	Free	January 20, 2012	
26	FW	(United States) Mike Fucito	(United States) Seattle Sounders FC	Acquired with Lamar Neagle for Eddie Johnson	February 17, 2012	
25	MF	(United States) Lamar Neagle	(United States) Seattle Sounders FC	Acquired with Mike Fucito for Eddie Johnson	February 17, 2012	
16	FW	(Cuba) Eduardo Sebrango	(Canada) Montreal Impact (NASL)	Free	February 21, 2012	
13	DF	(Italy) Matteo Ferrari	(Turkey) Beşiktaş J.K.	Free	March 1, 2012	
29	DF	(Scotland) Calum Mallace	(United States) Marquette Golden Eagles	2012 MLS SuperDraft	March 1, 2012	
36	FW	(Canada) Evan James	(United States) UNC Charlotte	2012 MLS Supplemental Draft	March 1, 2012	
38	DF	(Mexico) Gienir García	(Mexico) Cruz Azul Hidalgo	Acquired his rights for the rights to Etienne Barbara	March 1, 2012	
23	FW	(Italy) Bernardo Corradi	(Italy) Udinese Calcio	Free	March 15, 2012	
9	FW	(Italy) Marco Di Vaio	(Italy) Bologna F.C. 1909	Free	May 24, 2012	
34	DF	(Canada) Karl Ouimette	(Canada) Montreal Impact Academy	Graduated from the Academy	June 5, 2012	
14	DF	(Italy) Alessandro Nesta	(Italy) AC Milan	Free	July 2, 2012	
17	DF	(Switzerland) Dennis Iapichino	(Switzerland) FC Lugano	Free	July 11, 2012	
1	GK	(United States) Troy Perkins	(United States) Portland Timbers	Traded for Donovan Ricketts	August 7, 2012	

==== Out ====
No.	Pos.	Player	Transferred to	Fee/notes	Date	Source
–	MF	(United States) James Riley	(United States) Chivas USA	Traded for Justin Braun and Gerson Mayen	November 23, 2011	
–	DF	(United States) Seth Sinovic	(United States) Sporting Kansas City	Traded for Davy Arnaud and allocation money	November 28, 2011	
–	FW	(United States) Brian Ching	(United States) Houston Dynamo	Traded for a conditional pick in the 2013 MLS SuperDraft	February 16, 2012	
–	FW	(United States) Eddie Johnson	(United States) Seattle Sounders FC	Traded for Mike Fucito and Lamar Neagle	February 17, 2012	
–	MF	(England) Ian Westlake	(England) Needham Market F.C.	Waived	February 28, 2012	
–	MF	(El Salvador) Gerson Mayen	(El Salvador) C.D. FAS	Waived	March 1, 2012	
26	FW	(United States) Mike Fucito	(United States) Portland Timbers	Traded for either the Timbers' highest second round pick in the 2013 MLS SuperDraft or a 2013 international roster slot conditional on Fucito's performance	April 20, 2012	
38	DF	(Mexico) Gienir García	(Mexico) Cruz Azul Hidalgo	Waived	May 25, 2012	
–	DF	(United States) Bobby Burling	(United States) C.D. Chivas USA	Traded for an International Roster Spot in 2013	July 6, 2012	
17	FW	(United States) Justin Braun	(United States) Real Salt Lake	Traded for a conditional draft pick	July 11, 2012	
5	DF	(United States) Tyson Wahl	(United States) Colorado Rapids	Traded for an International Roster Spot in 2014	July 13, 2012	
1	GK	(Jamaica) Donovan Ricketts	(United States) Portland Timbers	Traded for Troy Perkins	August 7, 2012	

==== Loans Out ====
No.	Pos.	Player	Loaned too	Loan End Date	Date	Source
27	MF	(United States) Bryan Arguez	(Canada) FC Edmonton	September 23, 2012	July 9, 2012	
32	FW	(Colombia) Miguel Montaño	(Colombia) Deportivo Cali	January 15, 2013	July 16, 2012	

== International Caps ==
Players called for senior international duty during the 2012 season while under contract with the Montreal Impact.

Nationality	Position	Player	Competition	Date	Opponent
(The Gambia) Gambia	MF	Sanna Nyassi	2013 Africa Cup of Nations qualification	February 29, 2012	v Algeria
Jamaica	GK	Donovan Ricketts	Friendly	June 1, 2012	v Panama
Jamaica	GK	Donovan Ricketts	2014 FIFA World Cup qualification	June 8, 2012	v Guatemala
Canada	MF	Patrice Bernier	Friendly	August 15, 2012	v Trinidad and Tobago
Jamaica	DF	Shavar Thomas	Friendly	August 15, 2012	v El Salvador
Canada	MF	Patrice Bernier	2014 FIFA World Cup qualification	September 7, 2012	v Panama
Canada	MF	Patrice Bernier	2014 FIFA World Cup qualification	September 11, 2012	v Panama
Jamaica	DF	Shavar Thomas	2014 FIFA World Cup qualification	October 12, 2012	v Guatemala
Jamaica	DF	Shavar Thomas	2012 Caribbean Cup	December 8, 2012	v French Guiana
Jamaica	DF	Shavar Thomas	2012 Caribbean Cup	December 10, 2012	v Martinique

== Management ==
Position	Staff
Sporting Director	(Canada) Nick De Santis
Director of Soccer Operations	(United States) Matt Jordan
Director of Player Development & Head Coach of the Academy	(France) Philippe Eullaffroy
Head Coach	(United States) Jesse Marsch
Assistant Coaches	(Canada) Mauro Biello (United States) Mike Sorber
Goalkeeping Coach	(United States) Preston Burpo
Team Manager	(Canada) Adam Braz
Equipment Coordinator	(Netherlands) Remy Eyckerman
Equipment Manager	(Italy) Aldo Ricciuti

Last updated: November 24, 2011
Source: Montreal Impact Official Website

== Statistics ==
=== Appearances, minutes played, and goals scored ===
No.	Nat.	Player	Total			Major League Soccer			Canadian Championship			Ref.
No.	Nat.	Player	App.	Min.	Gls	App.	Min.	Gls	App.	Min.	Gls	Ref.
Goalkeepers
1	(United States)	Troy Perkins	9	810	0	9	810	0	0	0	0	
24	(Canada)	Greg Sutton	1	24	0	1	24	0	0	0	0	
30	(United States)	Evan Bush	1	90	0	1	90	0	0	0	0	
Defenders
2	(Colombia)	Nelson Rivas	11	858	0	11	858	0	0	0	0	
3	(Jamaica)	Shavar Thomas	17	1391	0	15	1255	0	2	136	0	
6	(France)	Hassoun Camara	21	1678	1	20	1663	1	1	15	0	
13	(Italy)	Matteo Ferrari	27	2209	0	25	2029	0	2	180	0	
14	(Italy)	Alessandro Nesta	8	633	0	8	633	0	0	0	0	
15	(United States)	Jeb Brovsky	30	2398	1	28	2233	0	2	165	0	
17	(Switzerland)	Dennis Iapichino	7	438	0	7	438	0	0	0	0	
19	(United States)	Zarek Valentin	15	1161	1	15	1161	1	0	0	0	
31	(United States)	Josh Gardner	6	451	0	6	451	0	0	0	0	
34	(Canada)	Karl Ouimette	2	66	0	2	66	0	0	0	0	
Midfielders
7	(Brazil)	Felipe	32	2782	4	30	2652	4	2	130	0	
8	(Canada)	Patrice Bernier	28	2240	9	27	2194	0	1	46	0	
11	(The Gambia)	Sanna Nyassi	30	1896	6	28	1716	6	2	180	0	
18	(United States)	Collen Warner	30	2521	0	29	2431	0	2	180	0	
21	(United States)	Justin Mapp	28	1685	2	27	1641	2	1	44	0	
22	(United States)	Davy Arnaud	35	2945	4	33	2765	4	2	180	0	
25	(United States)	Lamar Neagle	24	1157	2	23	1086	2	1	71	0	
27	(United States)	Bryan Arguez	0	0	0	0	0	0	0	0	0	
28	(Bosnia and Herzegovina)	Siniša Ubiparipović	14	434	2	12	325	2	2	109	0	
29	(Scotland)	Calum Mallace	4	289	0	4	289	0	0	0	0	
36	(Canada)	Evan James	0	0	0	0	0	0	0	0	0	
Forwards
9	(Italy)	Marco Di Vaio	17	1366	5	17	1366	5	0	0	0	
16	(Cuba)	Eduardo Sebrango	8	128	0	7	120	0	1	8	0	
23	(Italy)	Bernardo Corradi	13	791	4	11	619	4	2	172	0	
32	(Colombia)	Miguel Montaño	3	115	0	3	115	0	0	0	0	
33	(United States)	Andrew Wenger	23	823	4	23	823	4	0	0	0	
No longer with the Club
1	(Jamaica)	Donovan Ricketts	26	2316	0	24	2136	0	2	180	0	
5	(United States)	Tyson Wahl	13	1170	0	11	990	0	2	180	0	
17	(United States)	Justin Braun	13	498	0	12	494	0	1	4	0	
26	(United States)	Mike Fucito	1	26	0	1	26	0	0	0	0	
38	(Mexico)	Gienir García	0	0	0	0	0	0	0	0	0	
Last updated: November 5, 2012

=== Goalkeeper stats ===
No.	Nat.	Player	Total			Major League Soccer			Canadian Championship		
No.	Nat.	Player	MIN	GA	GAA	MIN	GA	GAA	MIN	GA	GAA
1	USA	Troy Perkins	810	8	.89	810	8	0.89	0	0	0.00
1	JAM	Donovan Ricketts	2316	41	1.59	2136	39	1.64	180	2	1.00
24	CAN	Greg Sutton	24	1	3.75	24	1	3.75	0	0	0.00
30	USA	Evan Bush	90	3	3.00	90	3	3.00	0	0	0.00

Updated to match played July 24, 2012
Source: Montreal Impact
Italic: denotes player left the club during the season.

=== Top scorers ===
No.	Nat.	Player	Pos.	MLS	CC	TOTAL
8	(Canada)	Patrice Bernier	MF	9		9
11	(The Gambia)	Sanna Nyassi	MF	6		6
9	(Italy)	Marco Di Vaio	FW	5		5
7	(Brazil)	Felipe	MF	4		4
22	(United States)	Davy Arnaud	MF	4		4
23	(Italy)	Bernardo Corradi	FW	4		4
33	(United States)	Andrew Wenger	FW	4		4
21	(United States)	Justin Mapp	MF	2		2
25	(United States)	Lamar Neagle	MF	2		2
28	(Bosnia and Herzegovina)	Siniša Ubiparipović	MF	2		2
6	(France)	Hassoun Camara	DF	1		1
19	(United States)	Zarek Valentin	DF	1		1
Totals				45	0	45

Updated to match played November 5, 2012
Source: Montreal Impact

=== Top assists ===
No.	Nat.	Player	Pos.	Major League Soccer	Canadian Championship	TOTAL
7	(Brazil)	Felipe	MF	10		10
8	(Canada)	Patrice Bernier	MF	8		8
21	(United States)	Justin Mapp	MF	5		5
9	(Italy)	Marco Di Vaio	FW	3		3
11	(The Gambia)	Sanna Nyassi	MF	3		3
22	(United States)	Davy Arnaud	MF	3		3
6	(France)	Hassoun Camara	DF	2		2
25	(United States)	Lamar Neagle	MF	2		2
2	(Colombia)	Nelson Rivas	DF	1		1
15	(United States)	Jeb Brovsky	DF	1		1
17	(United States)	Justin Braun	MF	1		1
17	(Switzerland)	Dennis Iapichino	DF	1		1
18	(United States)	Collen Warner	MF	1		1
19	(United States)	Zarek Valentin	DF	1		1
23	(Italy)	Bernardo Corradi	FW	1		1
Totals				43	0	43

Updated to match played November 5, 2012
Source: Montreal Impact
Italic: denotes player left the club during the season.

=== Clean sheets ===
No.	Nat.	Player	Major League Soccer	Canadian Championship	TOTAL
1	(Jamaica)	Donovan Ricketts	3	1	4
1	(United States)	Troy Perkins	2		2
Totals			5	1	6

Updated to match played November 12, 2012
Source: Montreal Impact
Italic: denotes player left the club during the season.

=== Top minutes played ===
No.	Nat.	Player	Pos.	Major League Soccer	Canadian Championship	TOTAL
22	(United States)	Davy Arnaud	MF	2765	180	2945
7	(Brazil)	Felipe	MF	2456	130	2782
18	(United States)	Collen Warner	MF	2431	180	2521
15	(United States)	Jeb Brovsky	DF	2233	165	2398
1	(Jamaica)	Donovan Ricketts	GK	2136	180	2316
8	(Canada)	Patrice Bernier	MF	2194	46	2240
13	(Italy)	Matteo Ferrari	DF	2029	180	2209
11	(The Gambia)	Sanna Nyassi	MF	1716	180	1896
21	(United States)	Justin Mapp	MF	1641	44	1685
6	(France)	Hassoun Camara	DF	1663	15	1678

Updated to match played November 12, 2012
Source: Montreal Impact
Italic: denotes player left the club during the season.

=== Disciplinary record ===
Includes all competitive matches. The list is sorted by position, and then shirt number.

N	P	Nat.	Name	Major League Soccer			Canadian Championship			N/A			Others			Total			Notes
N	P	Nat.	Name	Yellow card	Second yellow card	Red card	Yellow card	Second yellow card	Red card	Yellow card	Second yellow card	Red card	Yellow card	Second yellow card	Red card	Yellow card	Second yellow card	Red card	Notes
1	GK	(United States)	Troy Perkins																
1	GK	(Jamaica)	Donovan Ricketts																
24	GK	(Canada)	Greg Sutton																
30	GK	(United States)	Evan Bush																
2	DF	(Colombia)	Nelson Rivas	2		1										2		1	Suspend for 3 games
3	DF	(Jamaica)	Shavar Thomas	2												2			
5	DF	(United States)	Tyson Wahl	3												3			
6	DF	(France)	Hassoun Camara	2		1										2		1	Suspend for 2 games
13	DF	(Italy)	Matteo Ferrari	3												3			
14	DF	(Italy)	Alessandro Nesta																
15	DF	(United States)	Jeb Brovsky	1		1										1		1	Suspend for 1 game
17	DF	(Switzerland)	Dennis Iapichino	2												2			
19	DF	(United States)	Zarek Valentin	1												1			
29	DF	(Scotland)	Calum Mallace																
31	DF	(United States)	Josh Gardner	1												1			
34	DF	(Canada)	Karl Ouimette																
38	DF	(Mexico)	Gienir García																
7	MF	(Brazil)	Felipe	5												5			Suspend for 1 game
8	MF	(Canada)	Patrice Bernier	5												5			Suspend for 1 game
11	MF	(The Gambia)	Sanna Nyassi	9			1									10			Suspend for 1 game
18	MF	(United States)	Collen Warner	6												6			
21	MF	(United States)	Justin Mapp																
22	MF	(United States)	Davy Arnaud	7												7			Suspend for 1 game
25	MF	(United States)	Lamar Neagle	1												1			
27	MF	(United States)	Bryan Arguez																
28	MF	(Bosnia and Herzegovina)	Siniša Ubiparipović	1												1			
9	FW	(Italy)	Marco Di Vaio	1												1			
16	FW	(Cuba)	Eduardo Sebrango																
17	FW	(United States)	Justin Braun																
23	FW	(Italy)	Bernardo Corradi	3												3			
26	FW	(United States)	Mike Fucito																
32	FW	(Colombia)	Miguel Montaño																
33	FW	(United States)	Andrew Wenger																
36	FW	(Canada)	Evan James																

Last updated: July 24, 2012
Source: Competitive matches
Ordered by (red card) , (second yellow card) and (yellow card)
(yellow card) = Number of bookings; (second yellow card) = Number of sending offs after a second yellow card; (red card) = Number of sending offs by a direct red card.

Italic: denotes no longer with club.

== Recognition ==
=== MLS Player of the Month ===
Month	Player/Manager	Nation	Position	Report
August	Bernier	Canada	MF	MLS Player of the Month: August

=== MLS Player of the Week ===
Week	Player/Manager	Nation	Position	Report
13–15	Bernier	Canada	MF	MLS Player of the Week: 13–15

=== MLS Team of the Week ===
Week	Player/Manager	Nation	Position	Report
2	Felipe	Brazil	MF	MLS Team of the Week: 2
8	Ferrari	Italy	DF	MLS Team of the Week: 8
9	Rivas	Colombia	DF	MLS Team of the Week: 9
9	Bernier	Canada	MF	MLS Team of the Week: 9
12	Bernier	Canada	MF	MLS Team of the Week: 12
13–15	Rivas	Colombia	DF	MLS Team of the Week: 13–15
13–15	Bernier	Canada	MF	MLS Team of the Week: 13–15
16	Arnaud	United States	MF	MLS Team of the Week: 16
21	Felipe	Brazil	MF	MLS Team of the Week: 21
22	Nesta	Italy	DF	MLS Team of the Week: 22
22	Felipe	Brazil	MF	MLS Team of the Week: 22
24	Bernier	Canada	MF	MLS Team of the Week: 24
24	Neagle	United States	MF	MLS Team of the Week: 24
25	Bernier	Canada	MF	MLS Team of the Week: 25
32	Ferrari	Italy	DF	MLS Team of the Week: 32

=== MLS Save of the Week ===
Week	Player/Manager	Nation	Save	Report
5	Ricketts	Jamaica	35'	SOTW
23	Perkins	United States	70'	SOTW

=== MLS Goal of the Week ===
Week	Player	Nation	Goal	Report
22	Felipe	Brazil	78'	GOTW
23	Nyassi	Gambia	61'	GOTW
24	Neagle	United States	61'	GOTW
25	Di Vaio	Italy	24'	GOTW

=== MLS Coach of the Week ===
Week	Player/Manager	Nation	Report
9	Marsch	United States	MLS Team of the Week: 9

=== Montreal Impact MVP ===
Year	Player	Nation	Position	Report
2012	Bernier	Canada	MF	Impact MVP 2012

== Miscellany ==
=== Allocation ranking ===
Montreal is in the No. 19 position in the MLS Allocation Ranking after using the No. 1 position to select Eddie Johnson. The allocation ranking is the mechanism used to determine which MLS club has first priority to acquire a U.S. National Team player who signs with MLS after playing abroad, or a former MLS player who returns to the league after having gone to a club abroad for a transfer fee. A ranking can be traded, provided that part of the compensation received in return is another club's ranking.

=== International roster slots ===
Montreal has 9 MLS International Roster Slots for use in the 2012 season. Each club in Major League Soccer is allocated 8 international roster spots and Montreal acquired one slot in a trade with Portland Timbers.

=== Future draft pick trades ===
Future picks acquired: *2013 MLS SuperDraft conditional round 2 pick from Portland Timbers; *2013 MLS SuperDraft conditional pick from Houston Dynamo; *2013 Supplemental Draft conditional pick from Columbus Crew; *2014 MLS SuperDraft conditional pick from Real Salt Lake.
Future picks traded: *2015 Supplemental Draft round 4 pick to Portland Timbers.
