= Zarek Valentin =

Puerto Rican footballer (born 1991)

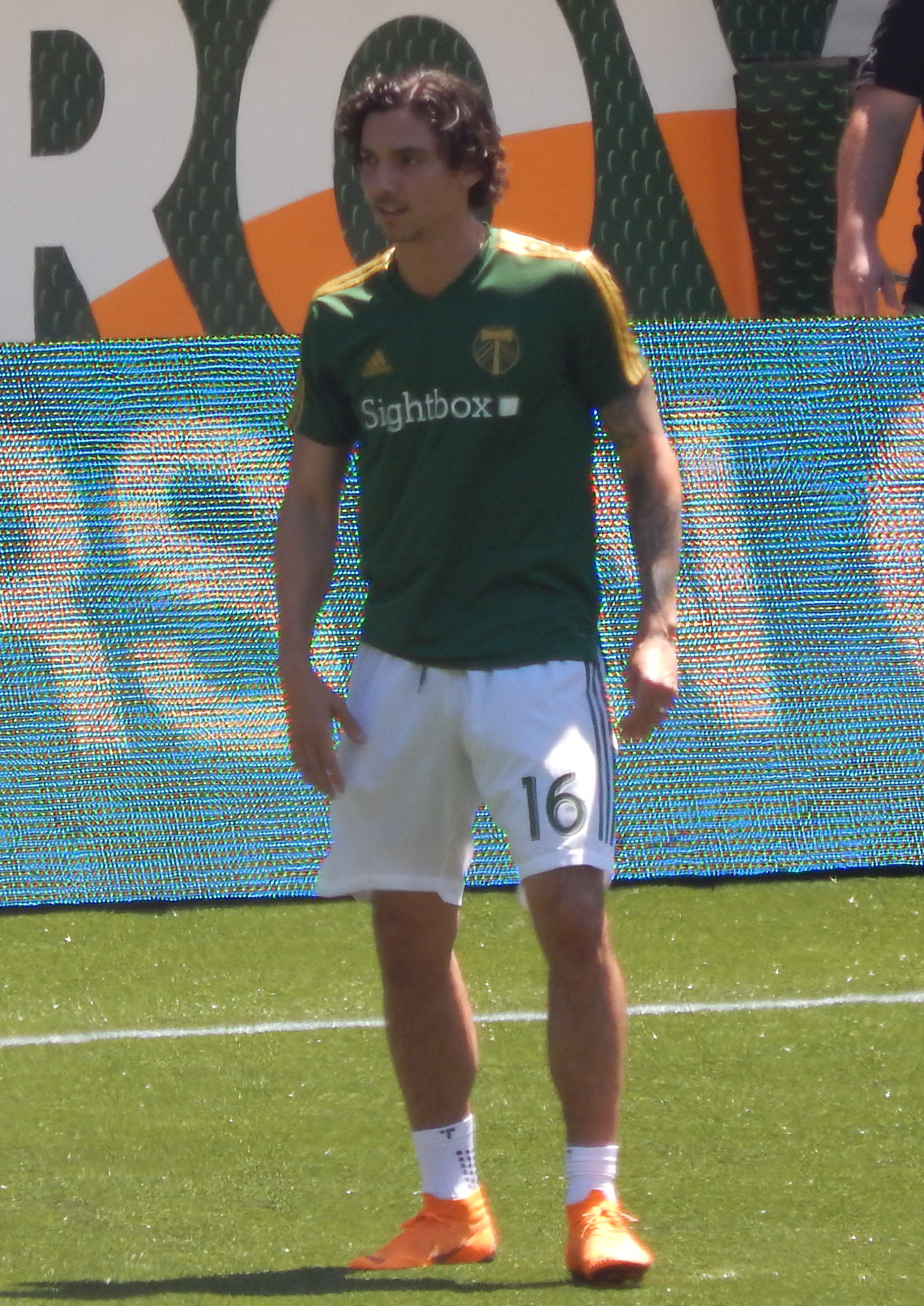
- Valentin with the Portland Timbers in 2018

Personal information
- Full name: Zarek Chase Valentin
- Date of birth: August 6, 1991 (age 35)
- Place of birth: Lancaster, Pennsylvania, United States
- Height: 1.83 m (6 ft 0 in)
- Position: Right-back

Youth career
- 2006: IMG Soccer Academy
- 2007–2009: PA Classics

College career
Years	Team	Apps	(Gls)
2009–2010	Akron Zips	50	(0)

Senior career*
Years	Team	Apps	(Gls)
2009	Reading Rage	4	(0)
2010	Michigan Bucks	5	(1)
2011	Chivas USA	25	(0)
2012–2013	Montreal Impact	15	(1)
2013	→ Bodø/Glimt (loan)	28	(1)
2014–2015	Bodø/Glimt	27	(1)
2016–2019	Portland Timbers	92	(1)
2017	Portland Timbers 2	3	(0)
2020–2022	Houston Dynamo	53	(0)
2023–2024	Minnesota United	24	(0)
2024	Minnesota United 2	4	(1)

International career^{‡}
2009–2011	United States U20	31	(0)
2012	United States U23	2	(0)
2021–2022	Puerto Rico	4	(1)
- * Club domestic league appearances and goals as of October 20, 2024 ‡ National team caps and goals as of July 19, 2022

Zarek Chase Valentin (born August 6, 1991) is a former professional footballer who played as a right-back. A former youth international for the United States, he captained the Puerto Rico national team.

== Club career ==
=== College and amateur ===
Valentin graduated from Manheim Township High School before enrolling at the University of Akron in 2009. He started all 25 games for the Zips in his freshman year, and was off the field for only 11 minutes. He was a key contributor in defense and allowed just seven goals all season, helping them finish with a 23-1-0 season record, ultimately losing on penalties during the NCAA National Championship in 2009. Although the team didn't take home the title, this was their first year making it to the finals. During just his first year in Ohio, he was named Mid-American Conference Newcomer of the Year, College Soccer News All-Freshman First Team, and the All-MAC First Team.

In his 2010 season at the University of Akron, Valentin helped lead his team to the NCAA Men's Division I Soccer Championship, where the team won the school's first ever National Championship. Valentin played every game at centerback to lead a defense that conceded only 16 goals over the entire season. He was named College Soccer News All-America Second Team, All-MAC First Team, and was named to the College Cup All-Tournament Team.

During his college years Valentin also played with Reading Rage and the Michigan Bucks in the USL Premier Development League.

At the completion of his 2010 season at the University of Akron, Valentin chose to forgo his final two seasons of collegiate eligibility, declaring for the MLS SuperDraft and signing a Generation Adidas contract with Major League Soccer as one of eleven players that year.

=== Professional ===
==== Chivas USA ====
Valentin was drafted in the first round, fourth overall, of the 2011 MLS SuperDraft by Chivas USA. He made his professional debut on March 19, 2011, in Chivas's first game of the 2011 MLS Season, a 3–2 loss to Sporting Kansas City. Valentin made 25 appearances in his rookie season, but it was a disappointing season for Chivas USA as the team missed out on the playoffs by 13 points.

==== Montreal Impact ====
Valentin joined expansion side Montreal Impact ahead of the 2012 season after Chivas USA left him unprotected in the 2011 MLS Expansion Draft. He made his impact debut on March 31 in a 5–2 loss to the New York Red Bulls. He scored the first goal of his professional career on July 8 to help Montreal to a 2–1 win over the Columbus Crew. Valentin suffered an ankle injury on July 21. He returned to play some games with the reserves, but did not appear with the first team again. He made 15 appearances in his first season in Montreal, but the Impact finished in 7th place in the Eastern Conference, missing out on the playoffs by 11 points. Ahead of the 2013 season, Marco Schällibaum took over as Impact manager. Schällibaum discussed with Valentin that he would not get significant playing time in 2013, and they should look for a situation where he would get more minutes.

==== FK Bodø/Glimt ====
On March 27, 2013, Valentin joined Norwegian Adeccoligaen club FK Bodø/Glimt until the end of the year. He made his debut for Bodø/Glimt on April 7 in a 3–1 win over Ullensaker/Kisa IL in the opening match of the Adeccoligaen season. He recorded his first assist for the club on April 18 to help Bodø/Glimt defeat IK Junkeren in the NM Cupen first round. On May 5 he picked up two assists to help Bodø/Glimt to a 3–0 win over Follo FK. On June 19, Valentin recorded an assist to help Bodø/Glimt defeat Odds BK in the NM Cupen Round of 16. He scored his first goal for the club on November 3 to help Bodø/Glimt to a 2–1 over Stabæk. Valentin helped Bodø/Glimt finish first in the league and win promotion to the Tippeligaen.

On December 19, 2013, Valentin signed on a permanent deal with Bodø/Glimt. He made his Tippeligaen debut on March 30, 2014, in a 1–1 draw with Aalesunds FK. On April 9, Valentin suffered a torn achilles in training. Valentin managed to return to the field for the final match of the season on November 9, coming on as a substitute in a 3–2 win over Viking FK. Bodø/Glimt missed Valentin during the season, finishing just one spot above the relegation playoffs and allowing 60 goals, tied for the most in the league.

Valentin made his first appearance of the 2015 season on April 6, 3–1 loss to Sandefjord in matchweek one. He recorded his first assist of the season on April 30 in a 2–1 defeat to FK Haugesund. On July 18, he scored his first goal of the season in a 2–1 victory against Molde FK. Valentin finished the season with 1 goal and 4 assists in 24 appearances to help Bodø/Glimt finish in 9th place.

==== Portland Timbers ====
On January 12, 2016, Valentin joined the Portland Timbers, reuniting with Caleb Porter, who was his coach at Akron. Portland traded a 2016 season international roster slot to Montreal to acquire Valentin's rights. Valentin made his Timbers debut on March 13 in a 2–1 defeat to the San Jose Earthquakes. He scored his first goal for Portland on July 23 in a 2–1 loss to the LA Galaxy. After missing 5 games with a bone bruise, Valentin returned to the lineup on September 3, picking up his first assist for the Timbers in a 3–1 loss to FC Dallas. He made his first appearance in a continental competition on September 14, picking up an assist in a 4–1 defeat to Deportivo Saprissa in the CONCACAF Champions League group stage. Valentin ended his first season in Portland with 24 appearances and 1 goal across all competitions. The Timbers ended the season in 7th place in the Western Conference, 2 points behind the lost playoff spot.

Valentin made his first appearance of the 2017 season on March 18, recording one assist in a 4–2 win over the Houston Dynamo in matchweek 3. After not featuring much at the start of the year, Valentin spent time with Timbers 2 in the USL. He returned to the first team on May 20, coming off the bench in a 4–1 loss to his former team the Impact. Valentin got his second assist of the season on June 2 in a 2–0 win over San Jose. On July 29 he picked up his third assist of the year in a 2–2 draw with Houston. Valentin made 19 appearances in the regular season to help the Timbers finish first place in the Western Conference. Valentin would not feature in the playoffs, with the Timbers losing in the Conference Semi-finals to Houston.

On March 4, 2018, Valentin made his first appearance of the 2018 season, coming on as a substitute in a 2–1 loss to LA Galaxy in matchweek 1. He would make his first start of the season the following game, a 4–0 loss to the New York Red Bulls. Valentin made 32 league appearances for the Timbers as he helped them finish fifth in the Western Conference and qualify for the playoffs for the second consecutive season. He made his first career playoff appearance on October 31, playing the full 90 minutes of the Timbers 2–1 win over FC Dallas in the knockout round. In the conference semi-finals with Seattle Sounders FC, Valentin started the first leg, a 2–1 win, and came on as a late substitute in the second leg, a 3–2 loss, with Portland advancing on penalties. He started both legs of the conference final, helping Portland record a 2–1 victory over Sporting Kansas City on aggregate and advance to the 2018 MLS Cup Final. Valentin would start the final, but the Timbers would fall to Atlanta United FC 2–0. Valentin appeared in 40 of a possible 43 games for Portland in 2018, setting career highs for MLS appearances, starts, and minutes. On December 10, 2018, Valentin signed a new contract with Portland.

Valentin made his 2019 season debut on March 2, a 3–3 draw with the Colorado Rapids in the opening game of the season. He missed games on August 31 and September 7 due to a leg injury, followed by missing the game on September 15 due to the birth of his son, before returning to the team. Valentin made 21 appearances in the league, with zero goals and assists, to help the Timbers qualify for their third straight playoffs. However Valentin would not feature in their first round match that saw the Timbers lose 2–1 to Real Salt Lake.

==== Houston Dynamo ====
On November 19, 2019, Valentin was selected by Nashville SC in the 2019 MLS Expansion Draft and was subsequently traded to the Houston Dynamo in exchange for Joe Willis. On February 29, he made his Dynamo debut in a 1–1 draw with the LA Galaxy, recording an assist with a through ball to Mauro Manotas. On September 5, Valentin had an assist off of a cross to Manotas in the 85th minute to give Houston a 2–1 win over Sporting Kansas City. In a shortened season due to the COVID-19 pandemic, Valentin made 19 appearances and had 3 assists. It was a poor season for Houston as a team, as the Dynamo finished last in the Western Conference. On November 10, 2020, Valentin signed a contract extension with Houston until 2022, with a team option for 2023.

During the 2021 season, Valentin made 29 appearances, with 28 of them starts. He recorded his one assist of the season on August 21, setting up Matías Vera for the equalizing goal in a 2–2 draw against Texas Derby rivals FC Dallas. The season was another disappointing one as a team, with Houston finishing last in the West again.

The 2023 season saw Valentin drop to 3rd choice right-back, with Griffin Dorsey and Zeca new coach Paulo Nagamura's preferred choices. Valentin ended the season with 7 appearances across all competitions as the Dynamo missed out on the playoffs again, finishing 13th in the conference. The Dynamo declined his contract option following the season.

==== Minnesota United ====
On December 8, 2022, Valentin signed a one-year deal with Minnesota United FC.

== International career ==
Valentin was a member of various US Youth National teams, including the U-20s, U-18s, U-17 and U-15s. He has 29 caps for the United States U-20 men's national soccer team. Valentin was a valuable part of the 2010 Milk Cup winning squad. He assisted the final goal in their 3–0 victory over Northern Ireland in the final.

On September 15, 2016, Valentin was called up to the Puerto Rico national team by coach Carlos García Cantarero ahead of two 2017 Caribbean Cup qualifying games against Curaçao and Antigua and Barbuda, although he did not appear in those matches.

In October 2020, it was confirmed that Zarek Valentin agreed to represent Puerto Rico internationally for the upcoming 2022 FIFA World Cup qualification set to start in 2021. Valentin made his debut for Puerto Rico in a 7–0 victory over the Bahamas on June 2, 2021.

Valentin scored his first international goal in a Concacaf Nations League match against Cayman Islands at the 84th minute.

== Career statistics ==
As of March 21, 2023

Club	Season	League	League		National cup (Note: Appearances in U.S. Open Cup, Canadian Championship, and NM Cupen)		League cup (Note: Appearances in MLS Cup Playoffs)		Continental (Note: Appearances in CONCACAF Champions League)		Total	
Club	Season	League	Apps	Goals	Apps	Goals	Apps	Goals	Apps	Goals	Apps	Goals
Chivas USA	2011	Major League Soccer	25	0	0	0	—		—		25	0
Montreal Impact	2012	Major League Soccer	15	1	0	0	—		—		15	1
Bodø/Glimt (loan)	2013	1. divisjon	28	1	4	0	—		—		32	1
Bodø/Glimt	2014	Tippeligaen	3	0	0	0	—		—		3	0
Bodø/Glimt	2015	Tippeligaen	24	1	3	0	—		—		27	1
Bodø/Glimt	Bodø/Glimt Total		55	2	7	0	0	0	0	0	62	2
Portland Timbers	2016	Major League Soccer	20	1	2	0	—		2	0	24	1
Portland Timbers	2017	Major League Soccer	19	0	0	0	0	0	—		19	0
Portland Timbers	2018	Major League Soccer	32	0	2	0	6	0	—		40	0
Portland Timbers	2019	Major League Soccer	21	0	3	0	0	0	—		24	0
Portland Timbers	Timbers Total		92	1	7	0	6	0	2	0	107	1
Portland Timbers 2 (loan)	2017	United Soccer League	3	0	—		—		—		3	0
Houston Dynamo	2020	Major League Soccer	19	0	—		—		—		19	0
Houston Dynamo	2021	Major League Soccer	29	0	—		—		—		29	0
Houston Dynamo	2022	Major League Soccer	5	0	2	0	—		—		7	0
Houston Dynamo	Dynamo Total		53	0	2	0	0	0	0	0	55	0
Minnesota United FC	2023	Major League Soccer	3	0	0	0	0	0	0	0	3	0
Career total			245	4	16	0	6	0	2	0	269	4

=== International goals ===
No.	Date	Venue	Opponent	Score	Result	Competition
1.	9 June 2022	Truman Bodden Sports Complex, George Town, Cayman Islands	Cayman Islands	3–0	3–0	2022–23 CONCACAF Nations League

== Personal life ==
Valentin has two brothers and one sister. One of his older brothers is retired soccer player Julian Valentin, who played for MLS club LA Galaxy and NASL club FC Tampa Bay. His hobbies include cooking and playing the guitar. In 2010 Zarek was featured in The New York Times Magazine as one of eleven Next-Gen American Soccer players.

Valentin met his now wife Liz McAteer while playing for Montreal. Together, they have one son.

== Honors ==
University of Akron

- NCAA Men's Division I Soccer Championship: 2010

FK Bodø/Glimt

- 1. divisjon: 2013

United States

- Milk Cup U-20 Tournament: 2010

Individual

- Portland Timbers Community MVP: 2016, 2018
