= 2000–01 AC ChievoVerona season =

Chievo
2000–01 season
- Head coach: Luigi Delneri
- Stadium: Stadio Marcantonio Bentegodi
- Serie B: 3rd (promoted)
- Coppa Italia: Group stage
- Top goalscorer: League: Bernardo Corradi (13); All: Bernardo Corradi (13)
Home colours	Away colours	Third colours

The 2000–01 season was the 72nd season in the history of A.C. ChievoVerona and the club's seventh consecutive season in the second division of Italian football. In addition to the domestic league, ChievoVerona participated in this season's edition of the Coppa Italia.

== Competitions ==
=== Overall record ===
Competition	First match	Last match	Starting round	Final position	Record							
Competition	First match	Last match	Starting round	Final position	Pld	W	D	L	GF	GA	GD	Win %
Serie B	3 September 2000	10 June 2001	Matchday 1	3rd	38	19	13	6	54	34	+20	50.00
Coppa Italia	13 August 2000	20 August 2000	Group stage	Group stage	3	2	0	1	6	6	+0	66.67
Total					41	21	13	7	60	40	+20	51.22

Source: Competitions

=== Serie B ===
==== League table ====
Pos	Team	Pld	W	D	L	GF	GA	GD	Pts	Promotion or relegation
1	Torino (P, C)	38	22	7	9	48	33	+15	73	Promotion to Serie A
2	Piacenza (P)	38	20	10	8	51	34	+17	70	Promotion to Serie A
3	Chievo (P)	38	19	13	6	54	34	+20	70	Promotion to Serie A
4	Venezia (P)	38	19	12	7	62	43	+19	69	Promotion to Serie A
5	Empoli	38	18	10	10	52	43	+9	64	

Source: Almanacco Illustrato del Calcio - La Storia 1898-2004, Panini Edizioni, Modena, September 2005
Rules for classification: 1) points; 2) head-to-head points; 3) head-to-head goal difference; 4) head-to-head goals scored; 5) goal difference; 6) number of goals scored.
(C) Champions; (P) Promoted

==== Results summary ====
Overall								Home						Away					
Pld	W	D	L	GF	GA	GD	Pts	W	D	L	GF	GA	GD	W	D	L	GF	GA	GD
38	19	13	6	54	34	+20	70	13	5	1	34	17	+17	6	8	5	20	17	+3

==== Results by round ====
Round	1	2	3	4	5	6	7	8	9	10	11	12	13	14	15	16	17	18	19	20	21	22	23	24	25	26	27	28	29	30	31	32	33	34	35	36	37	38
Ground	A	H	A	H	H	A	H	A	H	A	H	A	H	A	H	A	A	H	A	H	A	H	A	H	A	H	H	A	H	A	H	A	A	H	A	H	A	H
Result	W	L	W	W	D	D	D	W	W	L	W	D	L	W	W	L	W	D	W	W	W	W	W	W	D	D	L	D	D	D	D	W	W	W	D	L	W	D
Position	8	10	7	4	4	4	4	2	2	4	3	3	5	4	1	2	1	1	1	1	1	1	1	1	1	1	1	1	1	2	4	3	2	1	1	3	3	3

A = Away; H = Home; W = Win; D = Draw; L = Loss

==== Matches ====
3 September 2000 1	Chievo	1–0	Genoa	Verona
--:-- CEST (UTC+2)				Stadium: Stadio Marcantonio Bentegodi

10 September 2000 2	Ternana	1–0	Chievo	Terni
--:-- CEST (UTC+2)

15 September 2000 3	Chievo	2–1	Treviso	Verona
--:-- CEST (UTC+2)				Stadium: Stadio Marcantonio Bentegodi

24 September 2000 4	Crotone	0–2	Chievo	Crotone
--:-- CEST (UTC+2)

1 October 2000 5	Cagliari	1–1	Chievo	Cagliari
--:-- CEST (UTC+2)

8 October 2000 6	Chievo	2–2	Cittadella	Verona
--:-- CEST (UTC+2)				Stadium: Stadio Marcantonio Bentegodi

22 October 2000 7	Ravenna	0–0	Chievo	Ravenna
--:-- CEST (UTC+2)

29 October 2000 8	Chievo	1–0	Ancona	Verona
--:-- CEST (UTC+2)				Stadium: Stadio Marcantonio Bentegodi

1 November 2000 9	Chievo	1–0	Empoli	Verona
--:-- CEST (UTC+2)				Stadium: Stadio Marcantonio Bentegodi

5 November 2000 10	Pistoiese	1–0	Chievo	Pistoia
--:-- CEST (UTC+2)				Stadium: Stadio Marcello Melani

12 November 2000 11	Chievo	4–2	Torino	Verona
--:-- CEST (UTC+2)				Stadium: Stadio Marcantonio Bentegodi

19 November 2000 12	Sampdoria	1–1	Chievo	Genoa
--:-- CEST (UTC+2)

26 November 2000 13	Chievo	0–2	Pescara	Verona
--:-- CEST (UTC+2)				Stadium: Stadio Marcantonio Bentegodi

4 December 2000 14	Cosenza	1–2	Chievo	Cosenza
--:-- CEST (UTC+2)

10 December 2000 15	Chievo	5–1	Monza	Verona
--:-- CEST (UTC+2)				Stadium: Stadio Marcantonio Bentegodi

15 December 2000 16	Piacenza	1–0	Chievo	Piacenza
--:-- CEST (UTC+2)

23 December 2000 17	Chievo	2–1	Venezia	Verona
--:-- CEST (UTC+2)				Stadium: Stadio Marcantonio Bentegodi

14 January 2001 18	Salernitana	1–1	Chievo	Salerno
--:-- CEST (UTC+2)

21 January 2001 19	Chievo	2–1	Siena	Verona
--:-- CEST (UTC+2)				Stadium: Stadio Marcantonio Bentegodi

26 January 2001 20	Genoa	0–1	Chievo	Genoa
--:-- CEST (UTC+2)

4 February 2001 21	Chievo	2–1	Ternana	Verona
--:-- CEST (UTC+2)				Stadium: Stadio Marcantonio Bentegodi

11 February 2001 22	Treviso	0–2	Chievo	Treviso
--:-- CEST (UTC+2)

18 February 2001 23	Chievo	3–1	Crotone	Verona
--:-- CEST (UTC+2)

25 February 2001 24	Chievo	2–1	Cagliari	Verona
--:-- CEST (UTC+2)

5 March 2001 25	Cittadella	0–0	Chievo	Cittadella
--:-- CEST (UTC+2)

11 March 2001 26	Chievo	0–0	Ravenna	Verona
--:-- CEST (UTC+2)

18 March 2001 27	Ancona	5–2	Chievo	Ancona
--:-- CEST (UTC+2)

26 March 2001 28	Empoli	1–1	Chievo	Empoli
--:-- CEST (UTC+2)

1 April 2001 29	Chievo	1–1	Pistoiese	Verona
--:-- CEST (UTC+2)				Stadium: Stadio Marcantonio Bentegodi

6 April 2001 30	Torino	0–0	Chievo	Turin
--:-- CEST (UTC+2)

14 April 2001 31	Chievo	1–1	Sampdoria	Verona
--:-- CEST (UTC+2)				Stadium: Stadio Marcantonio Bentegodi

22 April 2001 32	Pescara	0–2	Chievo	Pescara
--:-- CEST (UTC+2)

29 April 2001 33	Chievo	2–1	Cosenza	Verona
--:-- CEST (UTC+2)				Stadium: Stadio Marcantonio Bentegodi

12 May 2001 34	Monza	1–3	Chievo	Monza
--:-- CEST (UTC+2)

20 May 2001 35	Chievo	1–1	Piacenza	Verona
--:-- CEST (UTC+2)				Stadium: Stadio Marcantonio Bentegodi

27 May 2001 36	Venezia	2–1	Chievo	Venice
--:-- CEST (UTC+2)

3 June 2001 37	Chievo	2–0	Salernitana	Verona
--:-- CEST (UTC+2)				Stadium: Stadio Marcantonio Bentegodi

10 June 2001 38	Siena	1–1	Chievo	Siena
--:-- CEST (UTC+2)
