= Gienir García =

Mexican footballer (born 1989)

Personal information
- Full name: Gienir Eduardo García Figueroa
- Date of birth: 8 October 1989 (age 37)
- Place of birth: Zacatepec, Morelos, Mexico
- Height: 1.84 m (6 ft 0 in)
- Position: Defender

Youth career
- 2007–2008: Cruz Azul

Senior career*
Years	Team	Apps	(Gls)
2008–2011	Cruz Azul Hidalgo	9	(0)
2010–2011	Cruz Azul	1	(0)
2012	Montreal Impact	0	(0)
2012–2013	Cruz Azul Hidalgo	4	(0)
2013–2014	Ballenas Galeana	15	(0)
- * Club domestic league appearances and goals as of 17:00, 11 October 2012 (UTC)

Gienir Eduardo García Figueroa (born 8 October 1989) is a Mexican footballer.

== Club career ==
García began his career in the youth ranks of top Mexican club Cruz Azul. He made his first division debut on 3 July 2010, during the 2010–11 season. He also played for Cruz Azul Hidalgo in Mexico's Liga de Ascenso. Garcia played 2 matches in the 2010–11 CONCACAF Champions League with Cruz Azul and scored one goal versus San Francisco from Panama.

García entered the Major League Soccer draft in January 2012 and was chosen second overall in the 2012 MLS Supplemental Draft by Vancouver Whitecaps FC. Days later he was traded to Montreal Impact in exchange for the rights to Etienne Barbara.

On 25 May 2012, the Impact placed García on MLS waivers. he then returned to play for Cruz Azul Hidalgo for the 2012–13 season. The following season, García joined Ascenso MX side Ballenas Galeana.

== Personal ==
García is the son of former footballer, Gustavo, and brother of footballers Gustavo Enrique and Giovanni.

== See also ==
- List of people from Morelos
