= Bernardo Corradi =

Italian footballer and manager (born 1976)

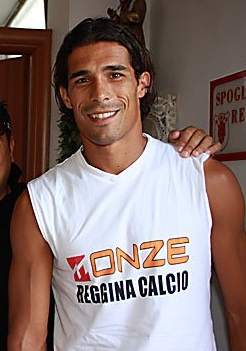
- Corradi in 2008, while at Reggina

Personal information
- Date of birth: 30 March 1976 (age 50)
- Place of birth: Siena, Italy
- Height: 1.89 m (6 ft 2 in)
- Position: Forward

Youth career
- Siena

Senior career*
Years	Team	Apps	(Gls)
1994–1996	Poggibonsi	47	(9)
1996–1997	Ponsacco	31	(6)
1997–2000	Cagliari	22	(0)
1997–1998	→ Montevarchi (loan)	26	(5)
1998–1999	→ Fidelis Andria (loan)	31	(7)
2000–2002	Chievo	68	(22)
2002	Inter Milan	0	(0)
2002–2004	Lazio	64	(20)
2004–2006	Valencia	21	(3)
2005–2006	→ Parma (loan)	36	(10)
2006–2008	Manchester City	25	(3)
2007–2008	→ Parma (loan)	27	(5)
2008–2009	Reggina	30	(10)
2009–2011	Udinese	37	(1)
2012	Montreal Impact	11	(4)
Total		476	(105)

International career
2003–2004	Italy	13	(2)

Managerial career
- 2019: Italy U16
- 2020: Italy U18
- 2020–2023: Italy U17
- 2023–2024: Italy U19
- 2024–2025: Italy U20
- 2026: Sampdoria
- * Club domestic league appearances and goals

Bernardo Corradi (Italian pronunciation: [berˈnardo korˈraːdi]; born 30 March 1976) is an Italian football coach and former player. A forward, he played top-division football for several teams in Italy, Spain, England, and Canada.

He is also a former Italy international, with 13 caps and two goals from 2003 to 2004. Corradi represented his country at UEFA Euro 2004.

== Club career ==
=== Early career ===
Corradi began his career in Italy with Siena, at that time at Serie C1. He then left for Poggibonsi of Serie C2. He played there for two seasons, one in Serie C2 and the second in Serie D. In 1996, he left for Serie C2 club Ponsacco, also located in Tuscany. In mid-1997, he joined Cagliari of Sardinia, and after two matches, he was loaned to Montevarchi in November. In the next season, he was loaned to Andria. In 1999, he returned to Cagliari and played his first Serie A match.

=== Chievo and Inter Milan ===
In 2000, Corradi was jointly signed by Chievo and Inter Milan. Using his height as ability, he started showing his talent as a central forward and scored his first Serie A goal at Chievo. He stayed at the club for two seasons, until Inter paid €4 million to purchase him outright.

Considered the ideal understudy to Christian Vieri, he played his first and only match for Inter against Sporting CP. After Ronaldo left the club for Real Madrid, Inter signed Lazio's Hernán Crespo, and sent Corradi in the opposite direction as part of the deal, in which Crespo was valued at €38 million and Corradi at €12 million. Lazio later brought down Corradi's value to €5.5 million and the rest deferred to amortize in a 10-year special amortization fund.

=== Lazio ===
At Lazio, Corradi scored on his debut, and formed a strike partnership with Claudio López, while Enrico Chiesa and Simone Inzaghi played as substitutes. He was offered a contract extension in July 2003. In the second season, he was the first choice, and partnered with Roberto Muzzi, Lopez or Inzaghi. Corradi scored ten goals in both his league seasons with the club, and also scored a vital away goal when Lazio beat Juventus to the 2004 Coppa Italia title.

=== Valencia ===
Corradi signed for Valencia in the summer of 2004, along with Lazio teammate Stefano Fiore, in a deal which also repaid unpaid transfer fees (€16.6 million) incurred when Gaizka Mendieta moved from Valencia to Lazio for €42 million, while Corradi was valued at €10 million. Corradi opened his season with the Spanish club by winning the UEFA Supercup. However, once compatriot coach Claudio Ranieri left the club, he found his first team appearances becoming less frequent, as he fell out of form. He was loaned back to Italy, playing for Parma for the 2005–06 season, in which he scored ten times in 36 appearances.

=== Manchester City ===
In the 2006 close season, he was sold by Valencia to Manchester City for an undisclosed fee on 20 July, signing a three-year contract with the Premier League club.

Corradi made his Manchester City debut in the opening match of the 2006–07 Premier League season against Chelsea, but was sent off after receiving a second yellow card due to his reaction to an incident involving Michael Essien. It took Corradi until his 13th Manchester City appearance before he scored his first goals for the club, when he scored twice against Fulham on 18 November 2006, becoming the first Italian to score for the club. In December, Corradi was again sent off for two yellow cards, this time against Manchester United, with the second for attempting to win a penalty by diving. The sending off in the Manchester Derby infuriated Stuart Pearce, who believed it was justified.

Corradi lost his starting place to Emile Mpenza, as he only scored three league goals during the 2006–07 season, his other goal coming in a defeat to Portsmouth in February. Corradi looked to be leaving Manchester City after his poor season. When Sven-Göran Eriksson was appointed as their new manager, Corradi was given a chance to impress and took it well by scoring four goals in the pre-season of 2007. However, he did not feature in any of their Premier League or League Cup games and was subsequently loaned out again to Parma for the rest of the season.

Corradi impressed during his first couple of appearances for his new club, but again got himself into disciplinary problems, when he was sent off in the first half, during a match with Roma. He finished with a tally of five goals in 15 starts, and was given the captain's armband.

=== Reggina and Udinese ===
On 30 July 2008, Manchester City confirmed that Corradi had been released from the final year of his contract, to return to Italy, and play for Reggina. On 31 May 2009, they terminated his contract with them.

On 3 July, he was signed for free by Udinese, who played him mainly as a substitute.

=== Montreal Impact ===
Corradi made his Impact debut in a 1–0 pre-season exhibition victory over Häcken of Sweden on 3 March 2012. He replaced Justin Mapp to start the second half, and played out the final 45 minutes of the match. On 15 March 2012, the Montreal Impact announced that he had signed for three months with the option to extend. He recorded his first MLS goal on 14 April in the 61st minute against FC Dallas with a penalty kick.

Corradi was released by Montreal on 7 December 2012.

== International career ==
Corradi won a total of 13 caps for Italy between 2003 and 2004, scoring two goals. He was considered as a replacement for Christian Vieri when he was first called up to the national team under Giovanni Trapattoni in February 2003; he debuted on 12 February, scoring the only goal of the match in a 1–0 friendly home win over Portugal. He was later included in their Euro 2004 squad, making one appearance throughout the tournament in his nation's 2–1 win over Bulgaria in their final group match, although Italy were eliminated in the first round on head-to-head record, despite not losing a match, following a three-way five-point tie with Denmark and Sweden.

Along with Valencia teammate Marco Di Vaio, he was played up front by new Italy national football team coach Marcello Lippi in the first few matches of qualification for the 2006 FIFA World Cup in late 2004. After the rise of Luca Toni and Alberto Gilardino, while Corradi struggled at Valencia, he did not receive an international call-up again.

== Style of play ==
Often described as an "old-fashioned" centre forward in the Italian media, Corradi was a tall, powerful, and physically strong striker, with an eye for goal, who excelled in the air; he was also known for his work-rate off the ball, and his ability to press defenders in order to help his team win back possession. During his prime, his playing style drew comparisons with that of Pierluigi Casiraghi.

== Coaching career ==
In 2017, Corradi joined the Italy national youth team as an assistant to Italy U17 head coach Carmine Nunziata. He subsequently worked as head coach of the Italy U16 and Italy U18, before returning to the Under-17 team in 2020, this time as a head coach. From August 2023, he managed Italy U19.

=== Sampdoria ===
On 25 June 2026, Corradi was appointed head coach of Serie B club Sampdoria, who had finished 13th in the 2025–26 season under caretaker Attilio Lombardo. It was his first job as a club head coach, and he arrived after a season as a technical assistant to Massimiliano Allegri at Milan, where he had agreed to terminate the final year of his contract. Sampdoria's football chief executive Jesper Fredberg said Corradi had stood out in the selection process for the clarity of his ideas, while sporting director Américo Branco pointed to his preference for a modern, attacking style of play. The appointment was poorly received by sections of the club's supporters, who had already protested at the Bogliasco training ground before it was confirmed.

Sampdoria were bottom of the table with one point from their opening four matches of the 2026–27 season when they came from behind to beat Catanzaro 2–1 at home on 19 September 2026, with Lorenzo Insigne equalising and Tjaš Begić scoring the winner after the side had been reduced to ten men. Corradi called it a scrappy win that his players had deserved, but it proved to be his only victory in charge. A 4–1 defeat at Avellino, in which Sampdoria conceded four goals in the space of 29 minutes, put his position under scrutiny, although the club publicly kept faith in him. On 18 October, Sampdoria took the lead against Arezzo at the Stadio Luigi Ferraris but lost 2–1, and supporters protested at the final whistle. Corradi was dismissed the following day, with Sampdoria bottom of Serie B on four points after one win, one draw and five defeats from their opening seven matches. Sport Mediaset described it as the worst start in the club's history in Serie B. His assistant Massimo Mutarelli and technical assistant Stefano Fiore left the club with him.

== Television career ==
Corradi (in couple with the dancer Stefano De Martino) in May–June 2017 were one of the tutors/mentors in the second season of Selfie – Le cose cambiano, a talent show produced by Fascino PGT of Maria De Filippi and aired by Canale 5 with Simona Ventura as presenter.

== Personal life ==
In June 2014, Corradi married the Italian model Elena Santarelli.

== Career statistics ==
=== Club ===
Appearances and goals by club, season and competition
Club	Season	League			National cup		League cup		Continental		Other		Total	
Club	Season	Division	Apps	Goals	Apps	Goals	Apps	Goals	Apps	Goals	Apps	Goals	Apps	Goals
Poggibonsi	1994–95	Serie C2	16	1	0	0	—		—		0	0	16	1
Poggibonsi	1995–96	Serie D	31	8	0	0	—		—		0	0	31	8
Poggibonsi	Total		47	9	0	0	—		—		0	0	47	9
Ponsacco	1996–97	Serie C2	31	6	0	0	—		—		0	0	31	6
Cagliari	1997–98	Serie B	2	0	3	0	—		—		—		5	0
Cagliari	1998–99	Serie A	0	0	0	0	—		—		—		0	0
Cagliari	1999–2000	Serie A	20	0	3	2	—		—		—		23	2
Cagliari	Total		22	0	6	2	—		—		—		28	2
Montevarchi (loan)	1997–98	Serie C1	26	5	0	0	—		—		0	0	26	5
Fidelis Andria (loan)	1998–99	Serie B	31	7	2	1	—		—		—		33	8
Chievo	2000–01	Serie B	36	12	3	1	—		—		—		39	13
Chievo	2001–02	Serie A	32	10	3	0	—		—		—		35	10
Chievo	Total		68	22	6	1	—		—		—		74	23
Inter Milan	2002–03	Serie A	0	0	0	0	—		1 (Note: Appearance(s) in UEFA Champions League)	0	—		1	0
Lazio	2002–03	Serie A	32	10	4	0	—		0	0	—		36	10
Lazio	2003–04	Serie A	32	10	6	1	—		8	1	—		46	12
Lazio	Total		64	20	10	1	—		8	1	—		82	22
Valencia	2004–05	La Liga	21	3	1	0	—		8 (Note: Six appearances one goal in UEFA Champions League; two appearances in UEFA Cup)	1	3 (Note: Two appearances one goal in Supercopa de España; one appearance in UEFA Super Cup)	1	33	5
Parma (loan)	2005–06	Serie A	36	10	3	0	—		—		—		39	10
Manchester City	2006–07	Premier League	25	3	3	0	1	0	—		—		29	3
Parma (loan)	2007–08	Serie A	27	5	0	0	—		—		—		27	5
Reggina	2008–09	Serie A	30	10	1	1	—		—		—		31	11
Udinese	2009–10	Serie A	19	0	2	1	—		—		—		21	1
Udinese	2010–11	Serie A	18	1	2	3	—		—		—		20	4
Udinese	Total		37	1	4	4	—		—		—		41	5
Montreal Impact	2012	MLS	11	4	2	0	—		—		—		13	4
Career total			476	105	38	10	1	0	17	2	3	1	535	118

=== International ===
Appearances and goals by national team and year
National team	Year	Apps	Goals
Italy	2003	7	2
Italy	2004	6	0
Total		13	2

Scores and results list Italy's goal tally first, score column indicates score after each Corradi goal.

List of international goals scored by Bernardo Corradi
No.	Date	Venue	Opponent	Score	Result	Competition
1	12 February 2003	Genoa, Italy	Portugal		1–0	Friendly
2	3 June 2003	Campobasso, Italy	Northern Ireland		2–0	Friendly

=== Managerial ===
As of matches played on 18 October 2026

Managerial record by team and tenure
Team	Nat	From	To	Record								Ref
Team	Nat	From	To	G	W	D	L	GF	GA	GD	Win %	Ref
Sampdoria	(Italy)	25 June 2026	19 October 2026	8	1	1	6	7	17	−10	12.50	
Career total				8	1	1	6	7	17	−10	12.50	—

== Honours ==
Lazio

- Coppa Italia: 2003–04

Valencia

- UEFA Super Cup: 2004
