= Gustavo García (1980s footballer) =

Mexican footballer

Gustavo Garcia
Personal information
- Full name: Gustavo García
- Place of birth: Mexico City, Mexico
- Position: Defender

Youth career
- –: Toluca

Senior career*
Years	Team	Apps	(Gls)
–	Toluca		
–	Córdoba		
–1982	Veracruz		
1982–1987	Toluca	58	(2)
1987–1988	Correcaminos	25	(0)
- * Club domestic league appearances and goals

Gustavo García is a Mexican former footballer who played in the Primera División with Toluca and Correcaminos.

== Club career ==
Born in Mexico City, García began his career in the youth ranks of local side Toluca. He played in the Toulon Tournament in 1978, and after returning had spells in the Segunda División with Azucareros de Córdoba and Veracruz. He made his Primera División debut with Toluca in 1982, and he played as a right-back for the club until 1987. García finished his career with Correcaminos, suffering a hip injury which forced him to retire in 1988.

== Personal ==
García is the father of professional footballers, Giener, Gustavo Enrique and Giovanni.
