= Felipe Martins (footballer, born September 1990) =

Brazilian footballer and coach

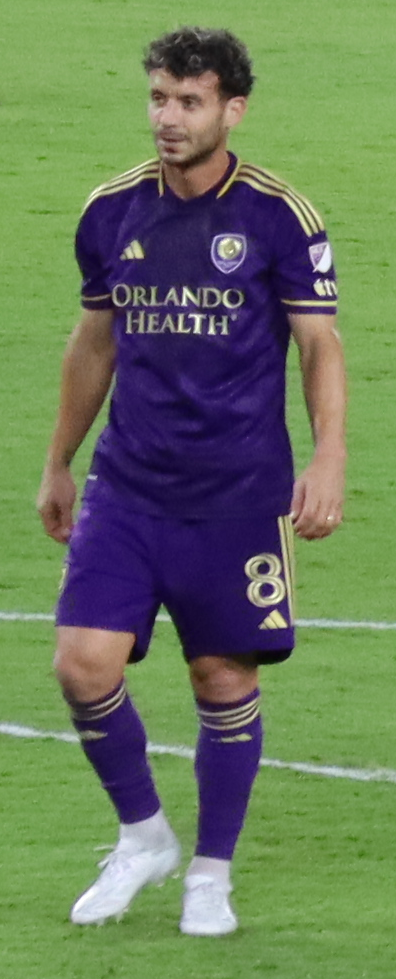
- Felipe with Orlando City in 2024

Personal information
- Full name: Felipe Campanholi Martins
- Date of birth: 30 September 1990 (age 36)
- Place of birth: Engenheiro Beltrão, Paraná, Brazil
- Height: 5 ft 7 in (1.70 m)
- Position: Midfielder

Team information
- Current team: The Island F.C. (youth coach and Head of Player Development)

Youth career
- PSTC-Londrina
- Atlético Catarinense-Arangua SC
- Campo Grande

Senior career*
Years	Team	Apps	(Gls)
2008	Padova	4	(0)
2009	FC Winterthur	10	(2)
2009–2011	FC Lugano	50	(7)
2011	→ FC Wohlen (loan)	15	(2)
2012–2014	Montreal Impact	93	(12)
2015–2018	New York Red Bulls	100	(10)
2018–2019	Vancouver Whitecaps	47	(2)
2019–2021	D.C. United	43	(1)
2022	Austin FC	28	(1)
2023–2024	Orlando City	30	(0)
2023	→ Orlando City B (loan)	1	(0)
2025	FC Cascavel	9	(0)
Total		398	(33)

Managerial career
- 2026–: The Island F.C. U17
- 2026–: The Island F.C. U19
- * Club domestic league appearances and goals

Felipe Campanholi Martins (born 30 September 1990), known mononymously as Felipe, is a Brazilian professional football coach and former player who is currently the head coach of MLS Next Pro club The Island F.C.'s under-17 and under-19 teams as well as their Head of Player Development.

Felipe began his professional career in the third division of Italy with Padova before moving to the Challenge League in Switzerland where he spent four seasons with FC Winterthur, FC Lugano, and FC Wohlen. In 2012, Felipe moved to Major League Soccer with Montreal Impact where he won his first trophies in his professional career, the 2013 and 2014 editions of the Canadian Championship. Felipe then transferred to the New York Red Bulls where he helped win the team's second ever Supporters' Shield in 2015.

After spending four seasons with the Red Bulls, the longest time Felipe spent with a single club, he moved to Vancouver Whitecaps where he was put out on loan in his second season to D.C. United, which was eventually made a permanent transfer. Felipe spent a single season with Austin FC before spending two seasons with Orlando City, where he also made a single appearance with the reserve affiliate Orlando City B. At the end of Felipe's second season with Orlando City, the team allowed his contract to expire, after which he moved to FC Cascavel in the fourth division of Brazil, but before the start of the regular season he left the club by mutual agreement and months later retired.

== Career ==
=== Beginnings ===
After beginning his career with small clubs in Rio de Janeiro, Felipe Martins signed with Italian club Padova in 2008. However, because of a minor heart defect, he was released. After expressing an interest to play in England, Felipe had a successful trial with AFC Bournemouth which played in League One during the 2007–2008 season, and was offered a contract. Eddie Howe, then manager of Bournemouth said, "He's got great talent and great feet and can certainly cross a ball. I've taken a long-term view and you've got to look to the future".

Despite the strong interest from Bournemouth, Felipe Martins opted to join FC Winterthur in Switzerland in January 2009. His form with Winterthur brought Felipe to the attention of bigger Swiss clubs. At the end of the season, he joined FC Lugano and remained at the club for three seasons, scoring a total of seven goals in 50 games. In 2011, he was loaned out to FC Wohlen, where he tallied two goals in 15 games.

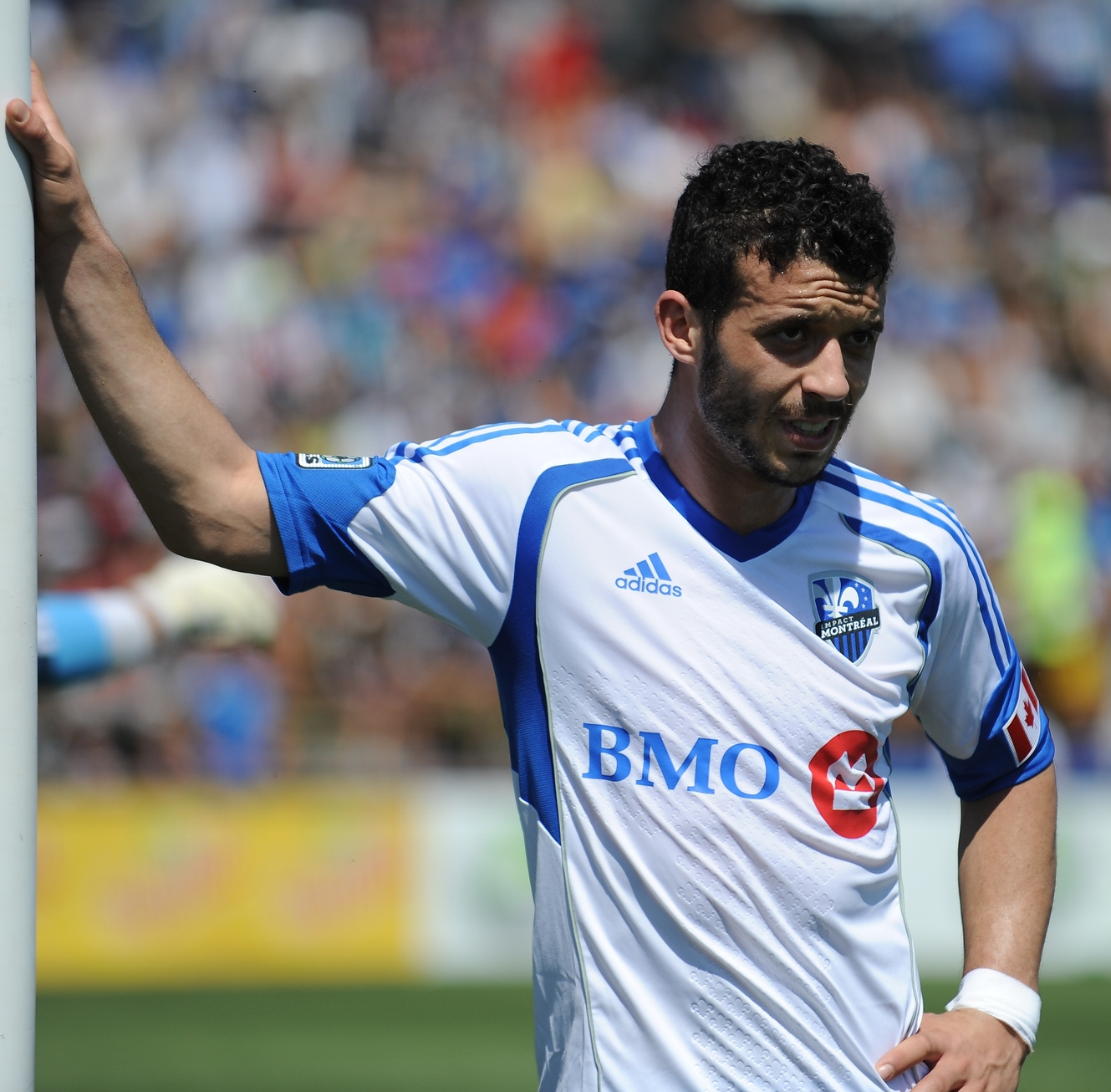
Felipe with Montreal in 2013

=== Montreal Impact ===
Felipe Martins signed with expansion side Montreal Impact of Major League Soccer on 21 December 2011. In his first season with Montreal he appeared in 30 league games scoring 4 goals and led the Impact with 10 assists. His first MLS goal came in a 2–0 victory over Sporting Kansas City on 5 May 2012. He would miss the final two matches of the season due to surgery for a sports related hernia. Felipe had a solid 2013 season in which he appeared in 32 league matches scoring 5 goals and 8 assists. He helped the club capture the 2013 Canadian Championship scoring Montreal's first goal in a 2–2 draw against Vancouver Whitecaps on 29 May 2013. Felipe made his CONCACAF Champions League debut in August and featured in three of Montreal's group stage matches. In September 2013, Felipe was listed 13th in the MLS' 24 under 24 series, which ranked the league's top young players. Felipe continued his fine play for Montreal during the 2014 season as he appeared in 31 league matches scoring 3 goals and 6 assists. His goal in second half stoppage time of the second leg of the 2014 Canadian Championship final against Toronto FC at Saputo Stadium on 4 June 2014 gave Montreal a 2–1 aggregate victory and a second consecutive Canadian Championship. Felipe was a part of the Impact squad that made the 2015 CONCACAF Champions League final, but only participated in the group stage as he was traded to the New York Red Bulls before the knock-out rounds.

=== New York Red Bulls ===
On 27 January 2015 it was announced that Felipe Martins had been traded to New York Red Bulls along with the top spot in the allocation order from the Montreal Impact, in exchange for Eric Alexander, Ambroise Oyongo, and an international player spot. Felipe reunited with his former Montreal manager, Jesse Marsch. The following day New York used the newly acquired top allocation ranking to sign midfielder Sacha Kljestan. Felipe made his debut for New York on 8 March 2015 appearing as a starter in a 1–1 draw at Sporting Kansas City. On 26 April 2015 Felipe scored his first goal for New York in a 1–1 draw against the LA Galaxy. On 9 August 2015 Felipe scored his second goal of the season in a 2–0 derby victory over New York City FC. On 20 September 2015 Felipe opened the scoring for New York with a 40-yard blast in a 2–0 victory over Portland Timbers. Felipe finished the season playing in every game during the Red Bulls campaign, including 34 league matches, three Open Cup matches and four MLS Cup matches. His consistent play in the midfield with partners, Sacha Kljestan and Dax McCarty lead New York to their second Supporters' Shield in three years.

On 19 March 2016, Felipe Martins helped New York to a come from behind victory over Houston Dynamo, scoring the equalizing goal in the 78th minute on a strike from 20 yards out and netting the game winner on a free kick minutes later in the 4–3 victory. Three days later, Felipe was named as the MLS Player of the Week for his performance. On 29 April 2016, Felipe helped New York to a 4–0 victory against FC Dallas scoring his third goal of the season and providing an assist. Felipe scored his fourth of the season on 13 July 2016 in a 2–0 victory over Orlando City. Felipe was named to the CONCACAF Champions League round one team of the week for his performance against Antigua GFC on 3 August.

On 19 July 2017, Felipe Martins scored his first goal of the season for New York in a 5–1 victory over San Jose Earthquakes.

=== Vancouver Whitecaps ===
On 2 March 2018 it was announced that Felipe had been traded to Vancouver Whitecaps, along with $500,000 in Transfer Allocation Money (TAM) and an international roster spot, in exchange for Tim Parker.

=== D.C. United ===
On 6 August 2019, Felipe Martins was traded to D.C. United in exchange for $75,000 in Targeted Allocation Money and an international roster spot. His debut was in a 2–1 win against LA Galaxy on 11 August 2019. Felipe tore his ACL in his right knee during practice on 1 September 2020, and is expected to be sidelined for 9 months. Felipe's contract option was declined by D.C. United on 30 November 2020, but he was re-signed by the club on 25 January 2021.

=== Orlando City ===
On 22 November 2022, Felipe joined Orlando City as a free agent, signing a one-year contract with a club option year. Felipe made his debut for the club 25 March 2023 when he started in a 2–1 win at Philadelphia Union, helping to end Philadelphia's 24 match unbeaten streak and 13 match winning streak at home. On 5 December 2024, it was announced that Orlando City had let Felipe's contract expire at the end of the season and were not pursuing an extension.

==== Orlando City B ====
Felipe made an appearance for Orlando City's reserve affiliate Orlando City B in MLS Next Pro, playing the full match of a 4–5 loss to New England Revolution II on 9 August 2023. Felipe provided an assist to Nabilai Kibunguchy.

=== FC Cascavel ===
On 17 January 2025, Felipe joined Série D club FC Cascavel as a free agent. The club described Felipe as having "got[ten] into Messi's mind" while playing for Orlando City. Two days later Felipe made his debut for the club when he came on as a 64th-minute substitute for Josiel in a 1–0 win over Coritiba in the Campeonato Paranaense. On 1 April, it was announced that by mutual agreement Felipe would depart the club ahead of the Série D season.

== International ==
Felipe Martins has not represented Brazil, his country of birth, at any level. Felipe was reportedly considering representing Canada internationally and applied for permanent residency, but without gaining full citizenship he could not appear for the Canada national team.

== Coaching career ==
On 1 May 2026, Felipe was announced as the head coach of MLS Next Pro club The Island F.C.'s under-17 and under-19 teams, as well as their Head of Player Development. The Island F.C. are expected to commence play in spring 2027.

== Personal life ==
On 15 June 2025, Felipe announced his retirement from football in an Instagram post. On 22 September, Felipe revealed on Instagram that he had begun attending Harvard Business School, writing, "For me, this is more than just studying — it’s about growth, perspective, and learning how to see opportunity even when times feel heavy."

== Career statistics ==
As of match played 5 March 2025

Appearances and goals by club, season and competition
Club	Season	League			State league		National Cup (Note: Includes Coppa Italia, Swiss Cup, Canadian Championship, U.S. Open Cup, and Copa do Brasil)		Continental (Note: Includes CONCACAF Champions League)		Playoffs (Note: Includes Swiss Super League/Challenge League playoffs, MLS Cup Playoffs)		Other		Total	
Club	Season	Division	Apps	Goals	Apps	Goals	Apps	Goals	Apps	Goals	Apps	Goals	Apps	Goals	Apps	Goals
Padova	2008–09	Serie C1	4	0	—		1	0	—		—		—		5	0
FC Winterthur	2008–09	Swiss Challenge League	10	2	—		0	0	—		—		—		10	2
FC Lugano	2009–10	Swiss Challenge League	27	5	—		3	0	—		1	0	—		31	5
FC Lugano	2010–11	Swiss Challenge League	23	2	—		3	1	—		—		—		26	3
FC Lugano	Total		50	7	0	0	6	1	0	0	1	0	0	0	57	8
FC Wohlen (loan)	2011–12	Swiss Challenge League	15	2	—		3	1	—		—		—		18	3
Montreal Impact	2012	Major League Soccer	30	4	—		2	0	—		—		—		32	4
Montreal Impact	2013	Major League Soccer	32	5	—		2	1	3	0	1	0	—		38	6
Montreal Impact	2014	Major League Soccer	31	3	—		3	1	3	0	—		—		37	4
Montreal Impact	Total		93	12	0	0	7	2	6	0	1	0	0	0	107	14
New York Red Bulls	2015	Major League Soccer	34	3	—		3	0	—		4	0	—		41	3
New York Red Bulls	2016	Major League Soccer	33	5	—		1	0	4	0	2	0	—		40	5
New York Red Bulls	2017	Major League Soccer	33	2	—		5	0	2	0	3	0	—		43	2
New York Red Bulls	2018	Major League Soccer	0	0	—		0	0	1	0	0	0	—		1	0
New York Red Bulls	Total		100	10	0	0	9	0	7	0	9	0	0	0	125	10
Vancouver Whitecaps	2018	Major League Soccer	29	1	—		1	0	—		—		—		30	1
Vancouver Whitecaps	2019	Major League Soccer	18	1	—		0	0	—		—		—		18	1
Vancouver Whitecaps	Total		47	2	0	0	1	0	0	0	0	0	0	0	48	2
D.C. United (loan)	2019	Major League Soccer	9	0	—		0	0	—		1	0	—		10	0
D.C. United	2020	Major League Soccer	7	0	—		0	0	—		—		—		7	0
D.C. United	2021	Major League Soccer	27	1	—		—		—		—		—		27	1
D.C. United	Total		43	1	0	0	0	0	0	0	1	0	0	0	44	1
Austin FC	2022	Major League Soccer	28	1	—		1	0	—		3	0	—		32	1
Austin FC	Total		28	1	0	0	1	0	0	0	3	0	0	0	32	1
Orlando City	2023	Major League Soccer	16	0	—		1	0	1	0	1	0	1	0	20	0
Orlando City	2024	Major League Soccer	14	0	—		—		3	0	—		0	0	17	0
Orlando City	Total		30	0	0	0	1	0	4	0	1	0	1	0	37	0
Orlando City B (loan)	2023	MLS Next Pro	1	0	—		—		—		0	0	—		1	0
FC Cascavel	2025	Série D	—		9	0	2	0	—		—		—		11	0
Career total			389	33	9	0	27	3	17	0	16	0	1	0	459	36

== Honours ==
Montreal Impact

- Canadian Championship: 2013, 2014

New York Red Bulls

- MLS Supporters' Shield: 2015
