= Peter Zaratin =

American soccer player & sports executive

Peter Zaratin is the founder and CEO of Globall Concepts, a sports and management company based on Long Island, New York.

== Globall Concepts ==
In 1998 Peter formed Globall Concepts, Inc. Within a three-year period, Peter developed Globall into a reputable soccer instructional and indoor facility management company with expertise in public-private facility partnership.

== Long Island Rough Riders ==
In 2005, Zaratin acquired the Long Island Rough Riders professional men's franchise which currently competes in League Two of the United Soccer Leagues. The Long Island Lady Riders women's franchise was added in 2007 and currently competes in the USL W-League. Today, the Long Island Rough Riders provide a pre-professional pathway for aspiring soccer players and numerous player development community based programs.

== Playing career ==
Zaratin played at the professional level with multiple USL A-League teams including the Raleigh Flyers, Staten Island Vipers, New York Fever, and the Montreal Impact. During the 1998 season, playing with the Impact, he was recruited by Spandauer SV, a former 3rd division club in the German Regionalliga.

== Coaching career ==
In 2003, Zaratin was named head goalkeeper coach for the New York Power. He also was Head Coach at Caňada Junior College (California) from 1992 to 1993 while attending Santa Clara University.

== College ==
Zaratin attended Santa Clara University (1990–1995) where he was recruited by former U.S. World Cup coach Steve Sampson. He was a member of the 1992 team that went to the NCAA National Finals and team captain in 1994 before graduating in 1995 with a B.S. in communications.

== Awards and Licenses ==
Peter holds a USSF A, USSF B, and a USSF youth License. He was also an inducted member of the City of Glen Cove Hall of Fame for playing and coaching accomplishments.
