= Francesco Cozza (footballer) =

Italian footballer and manager

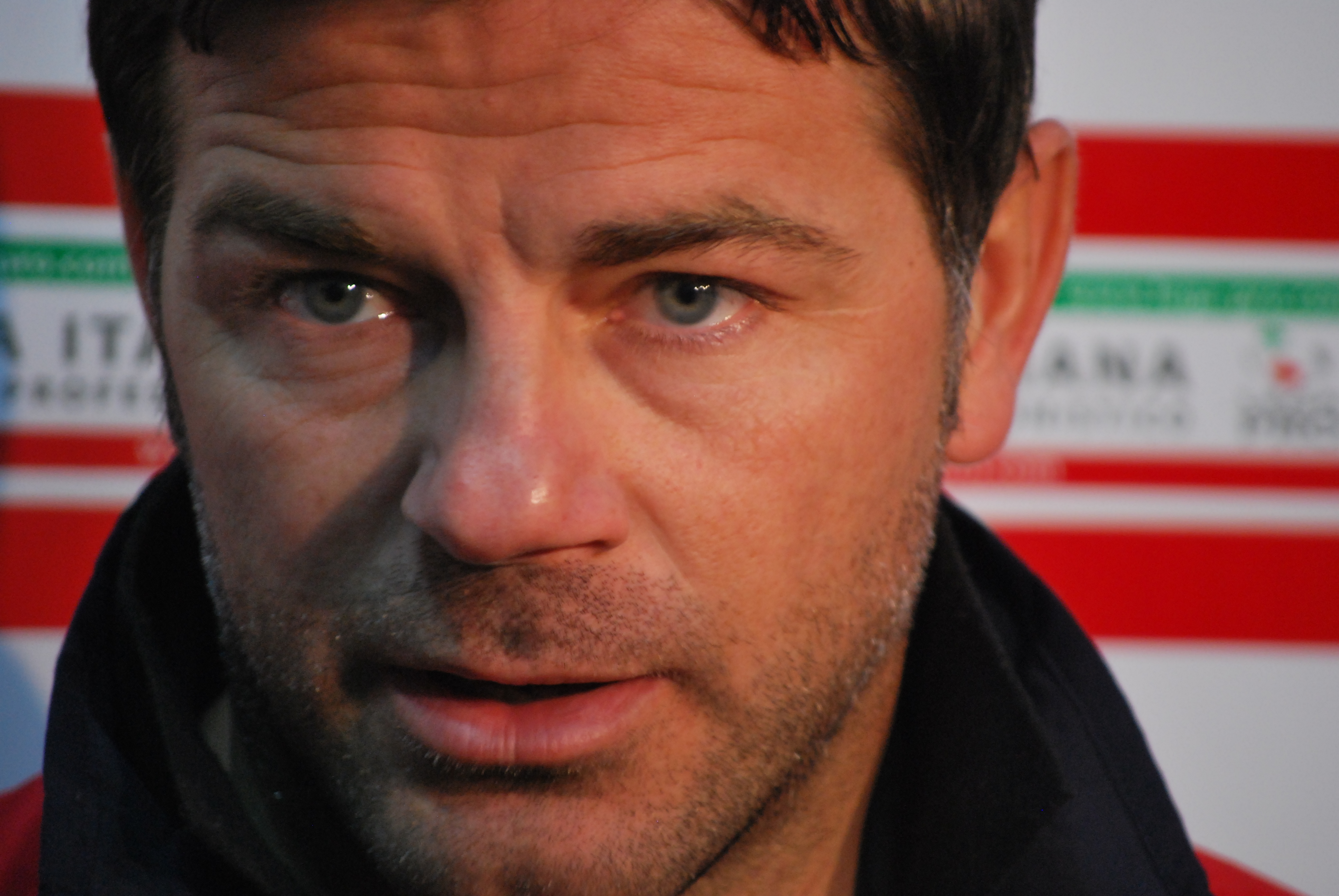

Personal information
- Date of birth: 19 January 1974 (age 52)
- Place of birth: Cariati, Italy
- Height: 1.81 m (5 ft 11 1/2 in)
- Position: Midfielder

Youth career
- 1992–1994: Milan

Senior career*
Years	Team	Apps	(Gls)
1994	Reggiana	3	(0)
1994–1995	Vicenza	18	(2)
1995	Torino	0	(0)
1995–1996	Lucchese	28	(6)
1996–1997	Cagliari	28	(3)
1997–1998	Lecce	27	(2)
1999–2004	Reggina	146	(27)
2004	Genoa	5	(0)
2005–2007	Siena	29	(4)
2005–2006	→ Reggina (loan)	32	(9)
2007–2009	Reggina	52	(10)
2009–2010	Salernitana	15	(4)
Total		383	(67)

Managerial career
- 2011–2013: Catanzaro
- 2013–2014: Pisa
- 2014: Reggina
- 2015–2016: Reggina
- 2016–2017: Sicula Leonzio
- 2017: Taranto
- 2018–2019: Team Altamura
- 2020–2021: San Luca
- 2021: Biancavilla
- 2022–2023: San Luca
- * Club domestic league appearances and goals

Francesco Cozza (born 19 January 1974) is an Italian football manager and former player, who played as a playmaker in the role of attacking midfielder.

== Playing career ==
Born in Cariati, Calabria, Cozza started his career at A.C. Milan. He first signed for Reggiana in 1994, and in November left for Vicenza.

Cozza signed for Genoa C.F.C. at summer 2004, but left for A.C. Siena in January 2005. He returned to Reggina on loan for the 2005–06 season. Cozza returned to Siena in summer 2006, but left for Reggina again in summer 2007, in exchange with Alessandro Lucarelli.

== Coaching career ==
On 29 June 2010, he signed a one-year contract with his former club Reggina, but as one of the coach assistant of youth team.

On 2 July 2011, it was confirmed Cozza had accepted an offer to become new head coach of Catanzaro in the Lega Pro Seconda Divisione (fourth division), he recently passed the coach exam.

After guiding Calabrian Serie D amateurs San Luca during the 2020–21 season, on 25 September 2021 Cozza was hired by Biancavilla, another Serie D club. He was fired by Biancavilla on 5 November 2021 after gaining 4 points in 7 games under his helm.

On 8 July 2022, Cozza agreed to return to guide San Luca for the 2022–23 Serie D season. He was sacked on 15 January 2023, just a mere few hours before the Serie D league game against Catania.
