= Gustavo García (footballer, born 1980) =

Mexican footballer

Gustavo Enrique García Figueroa (born 21 June 1980 in Zacatepec, Morelos) is a Mexican footballer, who plays as a defender for San Luis F.C.

Garcia made his debut during the Clausura 2004 with San Luis. For the Apertura 2005, Garcia was transferred to Club América, but did not make a senior appearance for América. At the end of the Clausura 2005 season Garcia was transferred to San Luis.

== See also ==
- List of people from Morelos
