= 2015 Montreal Impact season =

Montreal Impact
2015 season
- Owner & President: Joey Saputo
- Coach: Frank Klopas (until August 29); Mauro Biello (interim) (from August 29)
- Major League Soccer: Conference: 3rd Overall: 7th
- MLS Cup Playoffs: Conference Semifinals
- Canadian Championship: Runner-up
- CONCACAF Champions League: Runner-up
- Top goalscorer: League: Didier Drogba (11); All: Didier Drogba & Ignacio Piatti (12)
- Highest home attendance: 25,245 (Mar. 28 vs. Orlando)
- Lowest home attendance: 10,035 (Jun. 3 vs. Vancouver)
- Average home league attendance: 17,750
Home colours	Away colours

The 2015 Montreal Impact season was the club's 22nd season of existence, and their fourth in Major League Soccer, the top tier of the Canadian soccer pyramid. They advanced to the conference semifinals, where they lost to the Columbus Crew.

Outside of MLS regular season play, the club participated in the 2015 Canadian Championship, as well as the knockout stages of the 2014–15 CONCACAF Champions League.

== Background ==
=== Transfers ===
==== In ====
No.	Pos.	Player	Transferred from	Fee/notes	Date	Source
25	DF	(United States) Donny Toia	(United States) Chivas USA	Dispersal Draft	November 19, 2014	
33	MF	(Italy) Marco Donadel	(Italy) Napoli	Free transfer	December 1, 2014	
14	MF	(England) Nigel Reo-Coker	(United States) Chivas USA	Waiver Draft	December 10, 2014	
22	GK	(United States) Eric Kronberg	(United States) Sporting Kansas City	Re-Entry Draft Stage 1	December 12, 2014	
5	DF	(Mali) Bakary Soumaré	(United States) Chicago Fire	Re-Entry Draft Stage 2	December 18, 2014	
15	FW	(Argentina) Andrés Romero	(Brazil) Tombense	Transfer Fee	January 5, 2015	
17	FW	(Jamaica) Romario Williams	(United States) UCF Knight's	2015 MLS SuperDraft	January 15, 2015	
23	DF	(Belgium) Laurent Ciman	(Belgium) Standard Liège	Free transfer	January 22, 2015	
2	DF	(Cameroon) Ambroise Oyongo	(United States) New York Red Bulls	Traded for Felipe	January 27, 2015	
29	MF	(United States) Eric Alexander	(United States) New York Red Bulls	Traded for Felipe	January 27, 2015	
7	FW	(Ghana) Dominic Oduro	(Canada) Toronto FC	Traded for Allocation Money	January 27, 2015	
39	FW	(United States) Cameron Porter	(United States) Princeton Tigers	2015 MLS SuperDraft	February 7, 2015	
13	FW	(United States) Kenny Cooper	(United States) Seattle Sounders FC	Waivers	April 12, 2015	
30	GK	(Germany) Kristian Nicht	(United States) Indy Eleven	Transfer Fee	April 27, 2015	
18	MF	(Canada) Kyle Bekker	(United States) FC Dallas	Traded for Bakary Soumaré	July 16, 2015	
11	FW	(Ivory Coast) Didier Drogba	(England) Chelsea F.C.	Free Transfer	July 27, 2015	
27	MF	(Costa Rica) Johan Venegas	(Costa Rica) Alajuelense	Transfer Fee	August 3, 2015	

==== Out ====
No.	Pos.	Player	Transferred to	Fee/notes	Date	Source
9	FW	(Italy) Marco Di Vaio	Retired		October 2, 2014	
13	DF	(Italy) Matteo Ferrari	Retired		October 31, 2014	
98	DF	(The Gambia) Mamadou Danso	(United States) Carolina RailHawks	Option Declined	October 31, 2014	
25	MF	(Ghana) James Bissue	(United States) Pittsburgh Riverhounds	Option Declined	October 31, 2014	
43	MF	(Canada) Zakaria Messoudi	(Canada) FC Montreal	Option Declined	October 31, 2014	
33	MF	(Spain) Gorka Larrea	(United States) Indy Eleven	Option Declined	November 25, 2014	
1	GK	(United States) Troy Perkins	(United States) Seattle Sounders FC	Option Declined	November 25, 2014	
44	DF	(United States) Heath Pearce	(Sweden) IFK Göteborg	Expansion Draft	December 10, 2014	
5	DF	(Nigeria) Gege Soriola	(Nigeria) Shooting Stars SC	Free agent	December 11, 2014	
17	MF	(Canada) Issey Nakajima-Farran	(Malaysia) Terengganu FA	Waived	January 16, 2015	
7	MF	(Brazil) Felipe	(United States) New York Red Bulls	Traded For Alexander & Oyongo	January 27, 2015	
34	DF	(Canada) Karl Ouimette	(United States) New York Red Bulls	Waived	February 6, 2015	
2	DF	(Poland) Krzysztof Król	(Greece) AEL Kalloni F.C.	Waived	February 11, 2015	
49	MF	(Canada) Louis Béland-Goyette	(Canada) FC Montreal	Waived	March 26, 2015	
29	FW	(Uruguay) Santiago González	(Uruguay) Sud América	Removed from the roster	April 1, 2015	
30	GK	(Germany) Kristian Nicht	(United States) Indy Eleven	Waived	May 4, 2015	
19	MF	(United States) Blake Smith	(Switzerland) Yverdon Sport FC	Waived	May 7, 2015	
26	DF	(Spain) Adrián López Rodríguez	(Denmark) AGF Aarhus	Free agent	July 1, 2015	
5	DF	(Mali) Bakary Soumaré	(United States) FC Dallas	Traded for Kyle Bekker	July 16, 2015	
99	FW	(United States) Jack McInerney	(United States) Columbus Crew SC	Traded for a 2nd round pick in the 2016 MLS SuperDraft	August 4, 2015	

==== Loans in ====
No.	Pos.	Player	Loaned from	Loan start date	Loan end date	Source
36	DF	(Argentina) Víctor Cabrera	(Argentina) River Plate	January 8, 2015	December 31, 2015	
30	GK	(Germany) Kristian Nicht	(United States) Indy Eleven	February 5, 2015	March 19, 2015	
90	GK	(Canada) John Smits	(Canada) FC Edmonton	April 4, 2015	April 28, 2015	

==== Loans out ====
No.	Pos.	Player	Loaned to	Loan start date	Loan end date	Source
28	MF	(Canada) Jérémy Gagnon-Laparé	(Canada) Ottawa Fury FC	October 6, 2015	December 31, 2015	

== International caps ==
Players called for senior international duty during the 2015 season while under contract with the Montreal Impact.

Nationality	Position	Player	Competition	Date	Opponent	Minutes played	Score
Canada	MF	Patrice Bernier	Friendly	January 16, 2015	v Iceland	34'	1–2
Canada	DF	Karl Ouimette	Friendly	January 16, 2015	v Iceland	90'	1–2
Canada	DF	Maxim Tissot	Friendly	January 16, 2015	v Iceland	44'	1–2
Canada	MF	Patrice Bernier	Friendly	January 19, 2015	v Iceland	29'	1–1
Canada	DF	Karl Ouimette	Friendly	January 19, 2015	v Iceland	90'	1–1
Canada	DF	Maxim Tissot	Friendly	January 19, 2015	v Iceland	61'	1–1
Cameroon	DF	Ambroise Oyongo	Friendly	March 25, 2015	v Indonesia	79'	1–0
Canada	DF	Maxim Tissot	Friendly	March 27, 2015	v Guatemala	54'	1–0
Cameroon	DF	Ambroise Oyongo	Friendly	March 30, 2015	v Thailand	46'	3–2
Canada	DF	Maxim Tissot	Friendly	March 30, 2015	v Puerto Rico	90'	3–0
Canada	DF	Maxim Tissot	2018 FIFA World Cup qualification	June 11, 2015	v Dominica	16'	2–0
Cameroon	DF	Ambroise Oyongo	2017 Africa Cup of Nations qualification	June 14, 2015	v Mauritania	90'	1–0
Canada	DF	Maxim Tissot	2018 FIFA World Cup qualification	June 16, 2015	v Dominica	18'	4–0
Canada	DF	Maxim Tissot	2015 CONCACAF Gold Cup	July 14, 2015	v Costa Rica	68'	0–0
Costa Rica	MF	Johan Venegas	Friendly	September 5, 2015	v Brazil	90'	0–1
Cameroon	DF	Ambroise Oyongo	2017 Africa Cup of Nations qualification	September 6, 2015	v Gambia	90'	1–0
Costa Rica	MF	Johan Venegas	Friendly	September 8, 2015	v Uruguay	70'	1–0
Costa Rica	MF	Johan Venegas	Friendly	October 8, 2015	v South Africa	62'	0–1
Costa Rica	MF	Johan Venegas	Friendly	October 13, 2015	v USA	76'	1–0
Canada	MF	Maxim Tissot	Friendly	October 13, 2015	v Ghana	3'	1–1
Canada	DF	Wandrille Lefèvre	Friendly	October 13, 2015	v Ghana	90'	1–1
Cameroon	DF	Ambroise Oyongo	2018 FIFA World Cup qualification	November 13, 2015	v Niger	90'	3–0
Costa Rica	MF	Johan Venegas	2018 FIFA World Cup qualification	November 13, 2015	v Haiti	90'	1–0
Cameroon	DF	Ambroise Oyongo	2018 FIFA World Cup qualification	November 17, 2015	v Niger	90'	0–0

== Pre-season friendlies ==
Win Draw Loss

MD	Date, KO EST	Venue	Opponent	Res. F–A	Att.	Goalscorers and disciplined players		Ref.
MD	Date, KO EST	Venue	Opponent	Res. F–A	Att.	Montreal Impact	Opponent	Ref.
1	February 10, 1:00 p.m.	A	Cruz Azul	0–1		McInerney (yellow card) 42'	Loeschbor (yellow card) 54'; Valadéz 58'	
2	February 17, 10:30 a.m.	A	Cruz Azul	1–0		Oduro 10'		
3	February 18, 10:30 a.m.	A	Cuautla FC	6–0		McInerney 7', 55'; Smith 43'; Porter 65', 90'; Williams 72'		

== Major League Soccer ==
=== Tables ===
==== Eastern Conference ====
Pos	Team	Pld	W	L	T	GF	GA	GD	Pts	Qualification
1	New York Red Bulls	34	18	10	6	62	43	+19	60	Qualification for the conference semifinals
2	Columbus Crew SC	34	15	11	8	58	53	+5	53	Qualification for the conference semifinals
3	Montreal Impact	34	15	13	6	48	44	+4	51	Qualification for the knockout round
4	D.C. United	34	15	13	6	43	45	−2	51	Qualification for the knockout round
5	New England Revolution	34	14	12	8	48	47	+1	50	Qualification for the knockout round

Source: MLS

==== Overall ====
Pos	Team	Pld	W	L	T	GF	GA	GD	Pts	
5	Portland Timbers (C)	34	15	11	8	41	39	+2	53	Qualification for the CONCACAF Champions League
6	Seattle Sounders FC	34	15	13	6	44	36	+8	51	
7	Montreal Impact	34	15	13	6	48	44	+4	51	
8	D.C. United	34	15	13	6	43	45	−2	51	
9	LA Galaxy	34	14	11	9	56	46	+10	51	

Source: MLS
Rules for classification: 1) points; 2) total wins; 3) total goal differential; 4) total goals scored
(C) MLS Cup champions

=== Results summary ===
Overall								Home						Away					
Pld	Pts	W	L	D	GF	GA	GD	W	L	D	GF	GA	GD	W	L	D	GF	GA	GD
34	51	15	13	6	48	44	+4	11	4	2	32	17	+15	4	9	4	16	27	−11

Last updated: October 25, 2015
Source: 2015 Major League Soccer season
Pld = Matches played; Pts = Points; W = Matches won; D = Matches drawn; L = Matches lost; GF = Goals for; GA = Goals against; GD = Goal difference

=== Fixtures & results ===
Win Draw Loss

MD	Date KO EST	Venue	Opponent	Res. F–A	Att.	Goalscorers and disciplined players		Ref.
MD	Date KO EST	Venue	Opponent	Res. F–A	Att.	Montreal Impact	Opponent	Ref.
1	March 7; 3:00 p.m.	A	D.C. United	0–1	11,549		Arrieta 58'	
2	March 21; 3:00 p.m.	A	New England Revolution	0–0	14,189	Cabrera (yellow card) 8'; Camara (yellow card) 29' (yellow-red card) 61'; Mallace (yellow card) 39'; McInerney (yellow card) 90+3'	Hall (yellow card) 90+1'	
3	March 28; 4:00 p.m.	H	Orlando City SC	2–2	25,245	Piatti 14' (pen.), (yellow card) 15'; McInerney 27'; Oduro (yellow card) 34'; Donadel (yellow card) 58'; Reo-Coker (yellow card) 74'	Ribeiro 29'; Kaká 30'; Collin (yellow card) 63'; Turner (yellow card) 76'	
4	April 11; 8:30 p.m.	A	Houston Dynamo	0–3	18,924	Alexander (yellow card) 65'; Ciman (yellow card) 89'; Reo-Coker (yellow card) 90+2'	Barnes 15'; Taylor (yellow card) 67'; Clark 72'; Lovejoy 80'	
5	May 9; 4:00 p.m.	H	Portland Timbers	1–2	13,020	Oduro 71'; Piatti (yellow card) 78'	Borchers 64'; Valeri 70'	
6	May 16; 4:00 p.m.	H	Real Salt Lake	4–1	12,158	Donadel (yellow card) 8'; Ciman 18'; Romero 20', 29'; Miller (yellow card) 76'; Duka 78'	Allen (yellow card) 38'; Vásquez (yellow card) 43'; Sandoval 47'; Beltran (yellow card) 58'	
7	May 23; 8:00 p.m.	H	FC Dallas	2–1	13,020	Piatti 25' (pen.); Soumaré (yellow card) 26'; Donadel (yellow card) 29'; McInerney 50', (yellow card) 90+3'; Romero (yellow card) 58'; Mallace (yellow card) 87'	Hedges (yellow card) 75', (goal) 77'	
8	May 30; 8:30 p.m.	A	Chicago Fire	0–3	15,256	Reo-Coker (yellow card) 3'; Donadel (yellow card) 23' (yellow-red card) 37'; Mallace (yellow card) 70'	Shipp 13'; Larentowicz 45' (pen.); Igboananike 72'	
9	June 3; 8:00 p.m.	H	Vancouver Whitecaps FC	2–1	10,035	McInerney 14'; Piatti 83'	Rodríguez (yellow card) 48'; Parker (yellow card) 71'; Morales 79' (pen.); Harvey (yellow card) 90'	
10	June 6; 7:30 p.m.	A	Columbus Crew SC	2–1	12,265	Tissot 56'; Donadel (yellow card) 75'; Romero (yellow card) 78', (goal) 79'; Toia (yellow card) 87'; McInerney (yellow card) 90+3'	Higuaín 90+1'	
11	June 13; 7:00 p.m.	A	New York City FC	1–3	24,042	Lefèvre 88'	Villa 31'; Allen (yellow card) 52'; Diskerud 76', 79'; Puko 90'	
12	June 20; 8:00 p.m.	H	Orlando City SC	2–0	17,820	Toia 36'; Bush (yellow card) 89'; Oduro 90+3', (yellow card) 90+3'	Higuita (yellow card) 45+1'	
13	June 24; 8:00 p.m.	A	Toronto FC	1–3	24,895	Oyongo 19'; Soumaré (yellow card) 20'; Ciman (yellow card) 70'	Bradley 27'; Altidore 56'; Giovinco 82' (pen.)	
14	June 27; 7:00 p.m.	A	Philadelphia Union	2–2	17,531	Romero (yellow card) 16'; Bernier (yellow card) 22' (yellow-red card) 67'; Piatti 28'; McInerney 70'; Toia (yellow card) 72'	Ayuk 8', (yellow card) 62' (yellow-red card) 77'; Edu (yellow card) 41', (goal) 76'	
15	July 4; 8:00 p.m.	H	New York City FC	1–2	18,112	Ciman (yellow card) 69'; Piatti 77' (pen.); Romero (yellow card) 90+3'	Villa 34', 82'; Poku (yellow card) 45+1'; Mullins (yellow card) 53'; Allen (yellow card) 61'	
16	July 11; 8:00 p.m.	H	Columbus Crew SC	3–0	15,304	Oduro 5', 80'; Donadel 8'; Duka (yellow card) 24'; Oyongo (yellow card) 66'; Soumaré (yellow card) 86'	Saeid (yellow card) 25'; Meram (yellow card) 55'	
17	July 18; 8:30 p.m.	A	Sporting Kansas City	1–2	19,070	Piatti 59'; Donadel (yellow card) 84'	Feilhaber 4'; Dwyer 34'	
18	July 25; 8:00 p.m.	H	Seattle Sounders FC	1–0	17,209	Ciman 88'; Donadel (yellow card) 90'; McInerney (yellow card) 90+3'	Pineda (yellow card) 84'	
19	August 1; 2:00 p.m.	A	New York City FC	3–2	27,645	Oduro 5'; Piatti 32', 84' (pen.); Donadel (yellow card) 45+1'; Romero (yellow card) 75'	Calle (yellow card) 22'; Mena (yellow card) 43'; Hernandez (yellow card) 53'; Villa 68' (pen.); McNamara 85'	
20	August 5; 8:00 p.m.	H	New York Red Bulls	1–1	19,213	Ciman (yellow card) 14' (yellow-red card) 79'; Oduro 42'; Alexander (yellow card) 55'; Venegas (yellow card) 75'	Grella (yellow card) 31'; Sam 52'; S. Wright-Phillips (yellow card) 31'	
21	August 8; 8:00 p.m.	H	D.C. United	0–1	18,769	Piatti (yellow card) 40'; Venegas (yellow card) 45'; Donadel (yellow card) 74'	Rolfe 13'; Arnaud (yellow card) 64'; Franklin (yellow card) 78'	
22	August 22; 8:00 p.m.	H	Philadelphia Union	0–1	20,801	Donadel (yellow card) 25'; Oduro (yellow card) 90+2'	Fabinho (yellow card) 73'; Le Toux 78'	
23	August 29; 4:00 p.m.	A	Toronto FC	1–2	30,266	Ciman (yellow card) 45+2' (yellow-red card) 77'; Cabrera (yellow card) 56'; Oduro 74', (yellow card) 90+4'	Warner (yellow card) 24'; Bradley 35'; Altidore 55'	
24	September 5; 8:00 p.m.	H	Chicago Fire	4–3	20,801	Tissot (yellow card) 24'; Drogba 27', 61', 65'; Lefèvre 42'; Bush (yellow card) 86'	Larentowicz 36' (pen.); Gilberto 44', (yellow card) 54'; Igboananike 59'	
25	September 12; 10:30 p.m.	A	LA Galaxy	0–0	27,000	Reo-Coker (yellow card) 37'; Romero (yellow card) 52'		
26	September 16; 10:30 p.m.	A	San Jose Earthquakes	1–1	18,000	Oyongo (red card) 49'; Bekker 65'; Kronberg (yellow card) 84'	Wondolowski 35'; Pelosi (yellow card) 75'	
27	September 19; 8:00 p.m.	H	New England Revolution	3–0	20,801	Venegas 5'; Drogba 60'; Ciman (yellow card) 63'; Donadel (yellow card) 69' (red card) 72'; Duka 76'		
28	September 23; 3:00 p.m.	H	Chicago Fire	2–1	17,832	Drogba 36'; Ciman (yellow card) 58' (yellow-red card) 90+1'; Romero 76', (yellow card) 76'; Cabrera (yellow card) 86'	Cociș (yellow card) 45+1'; Accam 50'; Polster (yellow card) 56'; Doody (yellow card) 80'; Harden (yellow card) 89'	
29	September 26; 5:00 p.m.	H	D.C. United	2–0	20,801	Drogba 4', 11', (yellow card) 53'; Reo-Coker (yellow card) 66'	DeLeon (yellow card) 49'; Birnbaum (yellow card) 50'; Doyle (yellow card) 62'	
30	October 3; 7:30 p.m.	A	Orlando City SC	1–2	35,421	Romero (yellow card) 19'; Oduro 43'; Toia (yellow card) 45+2'; Venegas (yellow card) 45+5'	Larin 33'; Hall (yellow card) 44'; Kaká (yellow card) 45+5'; Boden (yellow card) 62'; Hines 80'; Shea (yellow card) 87'	
31	October 7; 7:00 p.m	A	New York Red Bulls	1–2	14,961	Oyongo (red card) 15'; Donadel (yellow card) 27'; Toia (yellow card) 30'; Drogba 68'; Bernier (yellow card) 71'	Kljestan 16'; Sam 39'; Zubar (yellow card) 67'; Lade (yellow card) 76'; Zizzo (yellow card) 89'	
32	October 10; 9:00 p.m.	A	Colorado Rapids	1–0	17,427	Drogba 15'; Ciman (yellow card) 43'	Powers (yellow card) 14'; Ramírez (yellow card) 37'	
33	October 17; 7:30 p.m.	A	New England Revolution	1–0	42,947	Venegas (yellow card) 5'; Donadel (yellow card) 52'; Piatti 55'		
34	October 25; 5:00 p.m.	H	Toronto FC	2-1	20,801	Drogba 54', 55'; Cabrera (yellow card) 90+1'	Jackson (yellow card) 27'; Altidore 45'	

=== MLS Cup Playoffs ===
Win Draw Loss

Leg	Date – KO EST	Venue	Opponent	Res. F–A	Agg. score F–A	Att.	Goalscorers and disciplined player		Ref.
Leg	Date – KO EST	Venue	Opponent	Res. F–A	Agg. score F–A	Att.	Montreal Impact	Opponent	Ref.
Knockout Round
	October 29; 7:00 p.m.	H	Toronto FC	—	3-0	18,069	Bernier 18'; Piatti 33'; Drogba 39'	Delgado (yellow card) 87'	
Conference Semifinal
FL	November 1, 7:00 p.m.	H	Columbus Crew SC	2-1	—	17,655	Bernier 37'; Cabrera (yellow card) 45+2'; Oyongo (yellow card) 51'; Venegas 77'; Drogba (yellow card) 87'	Higuaín 33'; Sauro (yellow card) 52'; Afful (yellow card) 90+3'	
SL	November 8, 5:00 p.m.	A	Columbus Crew SC	1-3	3-4	19,026	Duka 40'; Donadel (yellow card) 85'; Camara (yellow card) 90+5'; Reo-Coker (yellow card) 104'	Kamara 4', 111'; Sauro (yellow card) 30'; Finlay 77'	

== CONCACAF Champions League ==
The 2015 CONCACAF Champions League Finals was the final of the 2014–15 CONCACAF Champions League, the 7th edition of the CONCACAF Champions League under its current format, and overall the 50th edition of the premium football club competition organized by CONCACAF, the regional governing body of North America, Central America, and the Caribbean.

=== CONCACAF Champions League review ===
Quarterfinals
6	(Honduras) Olimpia	1	0	1
3	(Costa Rica) Herediano	1	2	3
7	(Costa Rica) Saprissa	0	0	0
2	(Mexico) América	3	2	5
5	(Mexico) Pachuca	2	1	3
4	(Canada) Montreal Impact (a)	2	1	3
8	(Costa Rica) Alajuelense	5	1	6
1	(United States) D.C. United	2	2	4

Semifinals
3	(Costa Rica) Herediano	3	0	3
2	(Mexico) América	0	6	6
4	(Canada) Montreal Impact (a)	2	2	4
8	(Costa Rica) Alajuelense	0	4	4

Finals
2	(Mexico) América	1	4	5
4	(Canada) Montreal Impact	1	2	3

=== CONCACAF Champions League results ===
Leg	Date – KO EST	Venue	Opponent	Res. F–A	Agg. score F–A	Att.	Goalscorers and disciplined player		Ref.
Leg	Date – KO EST	Venue	Opponent	Res. F–A	Agg. score F–A	Att.	Montreal Impact	Opponent	Ref.
Quarterfinal
FL	February 24, 10:00 p.m.	A	Pachuca (Mexico)	2–2	—	12,000	Duka 25', 53'; Mapp (yellow card) 33'; Camara (yellow card) 79'; Piatti (yellow card) 87'	Olvera 56'; Nahuelpán 68'; Lozano (yellow card) 84'; Mosquera (yellow card) 89'	
SL	March 3, 8:00 p.m.	H	Pachuca (Mexico)	1–1	3–3 (a)	38,104	Mapp (yellow card) 55'; Reo-Coker (yellow card) 62'; Porter 90+4'	Herrera (yellow card) 37'; Hernándezr (yellow card) 56'; Cano 80' (pen.); Rojas (yellow card) 90+2'	
Semifinal
FL	March 18, 10:00 p.m.	H	Alajuelense (Costa Rica)	2–0	—	33,675	Donadel (yellow card) 5'; Piatti 9'; Cabrera 14'; Soumaré (yellow card) 59'	Gutiérrez (yellow card) 32'; López (yellow card) 36'; Soto (yellow card) 68'	
SL	April 7, 8:00 p.m.	A	Alajuelense (Costa Rica)	2–4	4 – 4 (a)	17,895	Bush (yellow card) 33'; McInerney 42', (yellow card) 70'; Oduro (yellow card) 43'; Romero 72'	McDonald (yellow card) 19', (goal) 90+3'; Gabas 47', 60', (yellow card) 70'; Guevara 79'	
Final
FL	April 22, 8:00 p.m.	A	Club América (Mexico)	1–1	—	56,783	Piatti 16', (yellow card) 17'; Duka (yellow card) 71'; Romero (yellow card) 88'	Martínez (yellow card) 45'; Peralta 89'; Aguilar (yellow card) 89'	
SL	April 29, 8:00 p.m.	H	Club América (Mexico)	2–4	3–5	61,004	Romero 8', (yellow card) 37'; Soumaré (yellow card) 24'; Ciman (yellow card) 63'; Oduro (yellow card) 69'; McInerney 89'	Guerrero (yellow card) 28'; Aguilar (yellow card) 34'; Martínez (yellow card) 36'; Benedetto 50', 66', 81', (yellow card) 67'; Peralta 64'	

== Canadian championship ==
=== Canadian Championship review ===
Preliminary round
FC Edmonton	3	3	6
Ottawa Fury FC	1	1	2

Semifinals
1	Vancouver Whitecaps FC	1	2	3
4	FC Edmonton	1	1	2
2	Toronto FC	0	3	3
3	Montreal Impact (a)	1	2	3

Final
1	Vancouver Whitecaps FC	2	2	4
3	Montreal Impact	2	0	2

=== Canadian Championship results ===
Win Draw Loss

Leg	Date KO EST	Venue	Opponent	Res. F–A	Agg. score F–A	Att.	Goalscorers and disciplined player		Ref.
Leg	Date KO EST	Venue	Opponent	Res. F–A	Agg. score F–A	Att.	Montreal Impact	Opponent	Ref.
Semifinal
FL	May 6, 9:00 p.m.	H	Toronto FC	1–0	—	12,518	Lefèvre (yellow card) 30'; McInerney 68'; Bernier (yellow card) 78'		
SL	May 13, 8:00 p.m.	A	Toronto FC	2–3	(a) 3–3	21,069	Oduro (yellow card) 16', (goal) 84'; Cooper 25'; Bernier (yellow card) 63'; Kronberg (yellow card) 90+5'	Altidore 22'; Cheyrou 56'; Giovinco 58', (yellow card) 73'	
Final
FL	August 12, 8:00 p.m.	H	Vancouver Whitecaps FC	2–2	—	12,395	Ciman 84'; Jackson-Hamel 85'	Watson (yellow card) 11'; Mattocks 65'; Morales 72'; Tornaghi (yellow card) 90+1'	
SL	August 26, 10:30 p.m.	A	Vancouver Whitecaps FC	0–2	2–4	19,616	Cabrera (yellow card) 22' (yellow-red card) 30'; Ciman (yellow card) 23'; Oduro (yellow card) 31'	Rivero 40'; Parker 53'	

== Player information ==
=== Squad information ===
No.	Name	Nationality	Position	Date of birth (age At Year End)	Previous club
Goalkeepers
1	Evan Bush	USA	GK	March 6, 1986 (age 40)	(Canada) Montreal Impact (NASL)
22	Eric Kronberg	USA	GK	June 7, 1983 (age 43)	(United States) Sporting Kansas City
40	Maxime Crépeau	CAN	GK	May 11, 1994 (age 32)	(Canada) Montreal Impact Academy
Defenders
2	Ambroise Oyongo	(Cameroon) CAM	LB	June 22, 1991 (age 35)	(United States) New York Red Bulls
3	Eric Miller	USA	LB\RB	January 15, 1993 (age 33)	(United States) Creighton Bluejays
6	Hassoun Camara	FRA	CB\RB	February 3, 1984 (age 42)	(Canada) Montreal Impact (NASL)
23	Laurent Ciman	BEL	CB	August 5, 1985 (age 41)	(Belgium) Standard Liège
25	Donny Toia	USA	LB	May 28, 1992 (age 34)	(United States) Chivas USA
36	Víctor Cabrera	ARG	CB	February 7, 1993 (age 33)	(Argentina) River Plate
55	Wandrille Lefèvre	CAN	CB	December 17, 1989 (age 36)	(Canada) Montreal Impact Academy
Midfielders
5	Dilly Duka	USA	AM	September 15, 1989 (age 37)	(United States) Chicago Fire
8	Patrice Bernier	CAN	DM	September 23, 1979 (age 47)	(Denmark) Lyngby Boldklub
10	Ignacio Piatti	ARG	AM	February 4, 1985 (age 41)	(Argentina) San Lorenzo de Almagro
14	Nigel Reo-Coker	ENG	CM	May 14, 1984 (age 42)	(United States) Chivas USA
16	Calum Mallace	SCO	DM	October 1, 1990 (age 36)	(United States) Marquette Golden Eagles
18	Kyle Bekker	CAN	CM	September 2, 1990 (age 36)	(United States) FC Dallas
21	Justin Mapp	USA	LM/CM	October 18, 1984 (age 42)	(United States) Philadelphia Union
27	Johan Venegas	CRC	CAM/LW	July 11, 1988 (age 38)	(Costa Rica) Alajuelense
28	Jérémy Gagnon-Laparé	CAN	DM	March 9, 1995 (age 31)	(Canada) Montreal Impact Academy
29	Eric Alexander	USA	CM	April 14, 1988 (age 38)	(United States) New York Red Bulls
33	Marco Donadel	ITA	DM	April 21, 1983 (age 43)	(Italy) Napoli
51	Maxim Tissot	CAN	LW/LB	April 13, 1992 (age 34)	(Canada) Montreal Impact Academy
Attackers
7	Dominic Oduro	GHA	ST	August 13, 1985 (age 41)	(Canada) Toronto FC
11	Didier Drogba	(Ivory Coast) IVC	ST	March 11, 1978 (age 48)	(England) Chelsea F.C.
13	Kenny Cooper	USA	ST	October 21, 1984 (age 42)	(United States) Seattle Sounders FC
15	Andrés Romero	ARG	ST	October 29, 1989 (age 37)	(Brazil) Tombense
17	Romario Williams	JAM	ST	August 15, 1994 (age 32)	(United States) UCF Knights
24	Anthony Jackson-Hamel	CAN	ST	August 3, 1993 (age 33)	(Canada) Montreal Impact Academy
39	Cameron Porter	USA	ST	May 23, 1993 (age 33)	(United States) Princeton Tigers

=== Squad and statistics ===
==== Appearances, minutes played, and goals scored ====
No.	Nat.	Player	Total			Major League Soccer			Canadian Championship			CONCACAF Champions League			MLS Cup Playoffs			Ref.
No.	Nat.	Player	App.	Min.	Gls	App.	Min.	Gls	App.	Min.	Gls	App.	Min.	Gls	App.	Min.	Gls	Ref.
Goalkeepers
1	(United States)	Evan Bush	39	3540	0	31	2790	0	0	0	0	5	450	0	3	300	0	
22	(United States)	Eric Kronberg	7	630	0	3	270	0	4	360	0	0	0	0	0	0	0	
40	(Canada)	Maxime Crépeau	0	0	0	0	0	0	0	0	0	0	0	0	0	0	0	
Defenders
2	(Cameroon)	Ambroise Oyongo	27	2309	1	22	1864	1	2	180	0	0	0	0	3	265	0	
3	(United States)	Eric Miller	12	721	0	9	517	0	2	180	0	1	24	0	0	0	0	
6	(France)	Hassoun Camara	12	619	0	9	478	0	0	0	0	2	86	0	1	55	0	
23	(Belgium)	Laurent Ciman	40	3605	3	27	2405	2	4	360	1	6	540	0	3	300	0	
25	(United States)	Donny Toia	42	3699	1	31	2699	1	2	180	0	6	520	0	3	300	0	
36	(Argentina)	Víctor Cabrera	29	2400	1	21	1730	0	1	30	0	4	340	1	3	300	0	
55	(Canada)	Wandrille Lefèvre	14	1260	2	11	990	2	3	270	0	0	0	0	0	0	0	
Midfielders
5	(United States)	Dilly Duka	40	2564	5	28	1779	2	3	160	0	6	447	2	3	178	1	
8	(Canada)	Patrice Bernier	29	1136	2	20	673	0	2	180	0	4	59	0	3	224	2	
10	(Argentina)	Ignacio Piatti	36	3077	12	26	2213	9	2	38	0	6	526	2	3	300	1	
14	(England)	Nigel Reo-Coker	40	2847	0	28	1873	0	3	249	0	6	521	0	3	184	0	
16	(Scotland)	Calum Mallace	38	2528	0	26	1808	0	3	229	0	6	329	0	3	162	0	
18	(Canada)	Kyle Bekker	4	178	1	3	165	1	0	0	0	0	0	0	1	13	0	
21	(United States)	Justin Mapp	9	563	0	5	264	0	2	119	0	2	180	0	0	0	0	
27	(Costa Rica)	Johan Venegas	16	952	2	12	746	1	2	154	0	0	0	0	2	52	1	
28	(Canada)	Jérémy Gagnon-Laparé	2	18	0	2	18	0	0	0	0	0	0	0	0	0	0	
29	(United States)	Eric Alexander	23	1075	0	20	878	0	3	197	0	0	0	0	0	0	0	
33	(Italy)	Marco Donadel	34	2730	1	25	2000	1	2	163	0	4	267	0	3	300	0	
51	(Canada)	Maxim Tissot	18	885	1	11	581	1	3	212	0	4	92	0	0	0	0	
Forwards
7	(Ghana)	Dominic Oduro	40	2567	9	28	1671	8	4	318	1	6	511	0	2	67	0	
11	(Ivory Coast)	Didier Drogba	14	1170	12	11	870	11	0	0	0	0	0	0	3	300	1	
13	(United States)	Kenny Cooper	2	36	1	1	4	0	1	32	1	0	0	0	0	0	0	
15	(Argentina)	Andrés Romero	34	2178	6	27	1875	4	4	94	0	3	209	2	0	0	0	
17	(Jamaica)	Romario Williams	2	7	0	2	7	0	0	0	0	0	0	0	0	0	0	
24	(Canada)	Anthony Jackson-Hamel	10	203	1	8	156	0	2	47	1	0	0	0	0	0	0	
39	(United States)	Cameron Porter	5	143	1	2	39	0	0	0	0	3	104	1	0	0	0	
No Longer with the Club
5	(Mali)	Bakary Soumaré	16	1375	0	10	835	0	0	0	0	6	540	0	0	0	0	
19	(United States)	Blake Smith	0	0	0	0	0	0	0	0	0	0	0	0	0	0	0	
26	(Spain)	Adrián López Rodríguez	0	0	0	0	0	0	0	0	0	0	0	0	0	0	0	
29	(Uruguay)	Santiago González	0	0	0	0	0	0	0	0	0	0	0	0	0	0	0	
30	(Germany)	Kristian Nicht	1	90	0	0	0	0	0	0	0	1	90	0	0	0	0	
90	(Canada)	John Smits	0	0	0	0	0	0	0	0	0	0	0	0	0	0	0	
99	(United States)	Jack McInerney	22	1441	7	17	1188	4	2	148	1	3	105	2	0	0	0	
Last updated: November 9, 2015

==== Top Scorers ====
No.	Nat.	Player	Pos.	Major League Soccer	Canadian Championship	CONCACAF Champions League	MLS Cup Playoffs	TOTAL
10	(Argentina)	Ignacio Piatti	MF	9		2	1	12
11	(Ivory Coast)	Didier Drogba	FW	11			1	12
7	(Ghana)	Dominic Oduro	FW	8	1			9
99	(United States)	Jack McInerney	FW	4	1	2		7
15	(Argentina)	Andrés Romero	MF	4		2		6
5	(United States)	Dilly Duka	MF	2		2	1	5
23	(Belgium)	Laurent Ciman	DF	2	1			3
8	(Canada)	Patrice Bernier	MF				2	2
27	(Costa Rica)	Johan Venegas	MF	1			1	2
55	(Canada)	Wandrille Lefèvre	DF	2				2
2	(Cameroon)	Ambroise Oyongo	DF	1				1
13	(United States)	Kenny Cooper	FW		1			1
18	(Canada)	Kyle Bekker	MF	1				1
24	(Canada)	Anthony Jackson-Hamel	FW		1			1
25	(United States)	Donny Toia	DF	1				1
33	(Italy)	Marco Donadel	MF	1				1
36	(Argentina)	Víctor Cabrera	DF			1		1
39	(United States)	Cameron Porter	FW			1		1
51	(Canada)	Maxim Tissot	MF	1				1
Totals				46	5	10	6	67

Updated to match played November 9, 2015
Source: Montreal Impact

Italic: denotes player left the club during the season.

==== Top assists ====
No.	Nat.	Player	Pos.	Major League Soccer	Canadian Championship	CONCACAF Champions League	MLS Cup Playoffs	TOTAL
10	(Argentina)	Ignacio Piatti	MF	8		3	1	12
33	(Italy)	Marco Donadel	MF	5	1	1	1	8
16	(Scotland)	Calum Mallace	MF	3	1	1		5
7	(Ghana)	Dominic Oduro	FW			4		4
15	(Argentina)	Andrés Romero	MF	4				4
8	(Canada)	Patrice Bernier	MF	1		1	1	3
14	(England)	Nigel Reo-Coker	MF	2	1			3
23	(Belgium)	Laurent Ciman	DF	2			1	3
3	(United States)	Eric Miller	DF		2			2
5	(United States)	Dilly Duka	MF	2				2
36	(Argentina)	Víctor Cabrera	DF			1	1	2
1	(United States)	Evan Bush	GK	1				1
11	(Ivory Coast)	Didier Drogba	FW	1				1
21	(United States)	Justin Mapp	MF		1			1
25	(United States)	Donny Toia	DF			1		1
99	(United States)	Jack McInerney	FW		1			1
Totals				29	7	12	5	53

Updated to match played November 9, 2015
Source: Montreal Impact

Italic: denotes player left the club during the season.

==== Top minutes played ====
No.	Nat.	Player	Pos.	Major League Soccer	Canadian Championship	CONCACAF Champions League	MLS Cup Playoffs	TOTAL
25	(United States)	Donny Toia	DF	2699	180	520	300	3699
23	(Belgium)	Laurent Ciman	DF	2405	360	540	300	3605
1	(United States)	Evan Bush	GK	2790		450	300	3540
10	(Argentina)	Ignacio Piatti	MF	2213	38	526	300	3077
14	(England)	Nigel Reo-Coker	MF	1873	249	521	184	2847
33	(Italy)	Marco Donadel	MF	2000	163	267	300	2730
7	(Ghana)	Dominic Oduro	FW	1671	318	511	67	2567
5	(United States)	Dilly Duka	MF	1779	160	447	178	2564
16	(Scotland)	Calum Mallace	MF	1808	229	329	162	2528
15	(Argentina)	Víctor Cabrera	DF	1730	30	340	300	2400

Updated to match played November 9, 2015
Source: Montreal Impact

Italic: denotes player left the club during the season.

==== Multi–goal games ====
No.	Pos.	Player	Date	Opponent	Number of Goals	Source
5	MF	(United States) Dilly Duka	February 24, 2015	vs C.F. Pachuca	2	
15	FW	(Argentina) Andrés Romero	May 16, 2015	vs Real Salt Lake	2	
7	FW	(Ghana) Dominic Oduro	July 11, 2015	vs Columbus Crew SC	2	
10	MF	(Argentina) Ignacio Piatti	August 1, 2015	vs New York City FC	2	
11	FW	(Ivory Coast) Didier Drogba	September 5, 2015	vs Chicago Fire Soccer Club	3	
11	FW	(Ivory Coast) Didier Drogba	September 26, 2015	vs D.C. United	2	
11	FW	(Ivory Coast) Didier Drogba	October 25, 2015	vs Toronto FC	2	

==== Goals against average ====
No.	Nat.	Player	Total			Major League Soccer			Canadian Championship			CONCACAF Champions League			MLS Cup Playoffs		
No.	Nat.	Player	MIN	GA	GAA	MIN	GA	GAA	MIN	GA	GAA	MIN	GA	GAA	MIN	GA	GAA
1	USA	Evan Bush	3540	51	1.29	2790	39	1.26	0	0	0.00	450	8	1.60	300	4	1.20
22	USA	Eric Kronberg	630	12	1.71	270	5	1.67	360	7	1.75	0	0	0.00	0	0	0.00
30	GER	Kristian Nicht	90	4	4.00	0	0	0.00	0	0	0.00	90	4	4.00	0	0	0.00
40	CAN	Maxime Crépeau	0	0	0.00	0	0	0.00	0	0	0.00	0	0	0.00	0	0	0.00

Updated to match played November 9, 2015
Source: Montreal Impact

Italic: denotes player left the club during the season.

==== Clean sheets ====
No.	Nat.	Player	Major League Soccer	Canadian Championship	CONCACAF Champions League	MLS Cup Playoffs	TOTAL
1	(United States)	Evan Bush	9		1	1	11
22	(United States)	Eric Kronberg		1			1
Totals			9	1	1	1	12

Updated to match played October 29, 2015
Source: Montreal Impact

==== Suspensions ====
No.	Pos.	Player	Date of Suspension	Length	Notes	Source
21	MF	(United States) Justin Mapp	March 3, 2015	1 Game #	Yellow Card Accumulation	
6	DF	(France) Hassoun Camara	March 21, 2015	1 Game	Second Yellow Card	
1	GK	(United States) Evan Bush	May 1, 2015	1 Game #	Yellow Card Accumulation	
33	MF	(Italy) Marco Donadel	May 30, 2015	1 Game	Second Yellow Card	
33	MF	(Italy) Marco Donadel	June 6, 2015	1 Game	Yellow Card Accumulation	
8	MF	(Canada) Patrice Bernier	June 27, 2015	1 Game	Second Yellow Card	
15	FW	(Argentina) Andrés Romero	July 4, 2015	1 Game	Yellow Card Accumulation	
33	MF	(Italy) Marco Donadel	August 1, 2015	1 Game	Yellow Card Accumulation	
23	DF	(Belgium) Laurent Ciman	August 5, 2015	1 Game	Second Yellow Card	
8	MF	(Canada) Patrice Bernier	August 12, 2015	1 Game ##	Yellow Card Accumulation	
23	DF	(Belgium) Laurent Ciman	September 12, 2015	1 Game	Yellow Card Accumulation	
23	DF	(Belgium) Laurent Ciman	September 16, 2015	1 Game	Second Yellow Card	
2	DF	(Cameroon) Ambroise Oyongo	September 19, 2015	1 Game	Red Card	
33	MF	(Italy) Marco Donadel	September 23, 2015	1 Game	Red Card	
23	DF	(Belgium) Laurent Ciman	September 26, 2015	1 Game	Second Yellow Card	
15	FW	(Argentina) Andrés Romero	September 26, 2015	1 Game	Yellow Card Accumulation	
33	MF	(Italy) Marco Donadel	October 10, 2015	1 Game	Yellow Card Accumulation	
2	DF	(Cameroon) Ambroise Oyongo	October 10, 2015	1 Game	Red Card	
23	DF	(Belgium) Laurent Ciman	October 17, 2015	1 Game	Yellow Card Accumulation	

1. (Concacaf Match)
  1. (Canadian Championship Match)

==== Yellow and red cards ====
No.	Player	Total			Major League Soccer			Canadian Championship			CONCACAF Champions League			MLS Cup Playoffs			Ref.
No.	Player	Yellow card	(yellow card) (red card)	Red card	Yellow card	(yellow card) (red card)	Red card	Yellow card	(yellow card) (red card)	Red card	Yellow card	(yellow card) (red card)	Red card	Yellow card	(yellow card) (red card)	Red card	Ref.
1	Evan Bush	4	0	0	2	0	0	0	0	0	2	0	0	0	0	0	
2	Ambroise Oyongo	2	0	2	1	0	2	0	0	0	0	0	0	1	0	0	
3	Eric Miller	1	0	0	1	0	0	0	0	0	0	0	0	0	0	0	
5	Dilly Duka	2	0	0	1	0	0	0	0	0	1	0	0	0	0	0	
6	Hassoun Camara	3	1	0	1	1	0	0	0	0	1	0	0	1	0	0	
7	Dominic Oduro	8	0	0	4	0	0	2	0	0	2	0	0	0	0	0	
8	Patrice Bernier	5	1	0	3	1	0	2	0	0	0	0	0	0	0	0	
10	Ignacio Piatti	5	0	0	3	0	0	0	0	0	2	0	0	0	0	0	
11	Didier Drogba	2	0	0	1	0	0	0	0	0	0	0	0	1	0	0	
13	Kenny Cooper	0	0	0	0	0	0	0	0	0	0	0	0	0	0	0	
14	Nigel Reo-Coker	7	0	0	5	0	0	0	0	0	1	0	0	1	0	0	
15	Andrés Romero	10	0	0	8	0	0	0	0	0	2	0	0	0	0	0	
16	Calum Mallace	3	0	0	3	0	0	0	0	0	0	0	0	0	0	0	
17	Romario Williams	0	0	0	0	0	0	0	0	0	0	0	0	0	0	0	
18	Kyle Bekker	0	0	0	0	0	0	0	0	0	0	0	0	0	0	0	
21	Justin Mapp	2	0	0	0	0	0	0	0	0	2	0	0	0	0	0	
22	Eric Kronberg	2	0	0	1	0	0	1	0	0	0	0	0	0	0	0	
23	Laurent Ciman	10	3	0	8	3	0	1	0	0	1	0	0	0	0	0	
24	Anthony Jackson-Hamel	0	0	0	0	0	0	0	0	0	0	0	0	0	0	0	
25	Donny Toia	4	0	0	4	0	0	0	0	0	0	0	0	0	0	0	
27	Johan Venegas	4	0	0	4	0	0	0	0	0	0	0	0	0	0	0	
28	Jérémy Gagnon-Laparé	0	0	0	0	0	0	0	0	0	0	0	0	0	0	0	
29	Eric Alexander	2	0	0	2	0	0	0	0	0	0	0	0	0	0	0	
33	Marco Donadel	15	1	1	13	1	1	0	0	0	1	0	0	1	0	0	
36	Víctor Cabrera	6	1	0	4	0	0	1	1	0	0	0	0	1	0	0	
39	Cameron Porter	0	0	0	0	0	0	0	0	0	0	0	0	0	0	0	
40	Maxime Crépeau	0	0	0	0	0	0	0	0	0	0	0	0	0	0	0	
51	Maxim Tissot	1	0	0	1	0	0	0	0	0	0	0	0	0	0	0	
55	Wandrille Lefèvre	1	0	0	0	0	0	1	0	0	0	0	0	0	0	0	
5	Bakary Soumaré	5	0	0	3	0	0	0	0	0	2	0	0	0	0	0	
19	Blake Smith	0	0	0	0	0	0	0	0	0	0	0	0	0	0	0	
26	Adrián López Rodríguez	0	0	0	0	0	0	0	0	0	0	0	0	0	0	0	
30	Kristian Nicht	0	0	0	0	0	0	0	0	0	0	0	0	0	0	0	
99	Jack McInerney	5	0	0	4	0	0	0	0	0	1	0	0	0	0	0	
Totals		109	8	2	77	7	2	8	1	0	18	0	0	6	0	0	
Last updated: November 9, 2015

=== International roster slots ===
Montreal has ten MLS International Roster Slots for use in the 2015 season. Each club in Major League Soccer is allocated eight international roster spots and Montreal acquired the extra slots in trades with D.C. United and New York Red Bulls.

Montreal Impact International slots
Slot	Player	Nationality
1	Laurent Ciman	Belgium
2	Marco Donadel	Italy
3	Nigel Reo-Coker	England
4	Ignacio Piatti	Argentina
5	Andrés Romero	Argentina
6	Víctor Cabrera	Argentina
7	Romario Williams	Jamaica
8	Ambroise Oyongo	Cameroon
9	Didier Drogba	Ivory Coast
10	Johan Venegas	Costa Rica

Foreign-Born Players with Domestic Status
Player	Nationality
Calum Mallace	(Scotland) Scotland^{G}
Dominic Oduro	(Ghana) Ghana^{G}
Wandrille Lefèvre	France / Canada
Hassoun Camara	France ^{C}

- (Canada) – Player is Canadian citizen;
- (United States) – Player is U.S. citizen;
- G – Player has U.S. green card;
- C – Player has permanent Canadian residency.

== Recognition ==
=== MLS Defender of the Year ===
Year	Player	Nation	Position	Report
2015	Ciman	Belgium	DF	MLS Player of the Year: 2015

=== MLS Top Francophone Player ===
Year	Player	Nation	Position	Report
2015	Ciman	Belgium	DF	MLS Francophone Player of the Year: 2015

=== MLS Best XI 2015 ===
Year	Player	Nation	Position	Report
2015	Ciman	Belgium	DF	MLS Best 11: 2015

=== MLS Player of the Month ===
Month	Player	Nation	Position	Report
September	Drogba	Ivory Coast	FW	MLS Player of the Month: Sep
October	Drogba	Ivory Coast	FW	MLS Player of the Month: Oct

=== MLS Player of the Week ===
Week	Player	Nation	Position	Report
27	Drogba	Ivory Coast	FW	MLS Player of the Week: 27
30	Drogba	Ivory Coast	FW	MLS Player of the Week: 30

=== MLS Goal of the Week ===
Week	Player	Nation	Position	Report
4	McInerney	United States	FW	MLS Goal of the Week: 4
19	Donadel	Italy	MF	MLS Goal of the Week: 19
27	Drogba	Ivory Coast	FW	MLS Goal of the Week: 27
30	Drogba	Ivory Coast	FW	MLS Goal of the Week: 30
33	Piatti	Argentina	MF	MLS Goal of the Week: 33

=== MLS Save of the Week ===
Week	Player	Nation	Position	Report
12	Bush	United States	GK	MLS Save of the Week: 12
19	Bush	United States	GK	MLS Save of the Week: 19
34	Bush	United States	GK	MLS Save of the Week: 34

=== MLS Team of the Week ===
Week	Player	Nation	Position	Report
11	Mallace	Scotland	MF	MLS Team of the Week: 11
11	Romero	Argentina	MF	MLS Team of the Week: 11
12	Ciman	Belgium	DF	MLS Team of the Week: 12
14	Toia	United States	DF	MLS Team of the Week: 14
14	Romero	Argentina	MF	MLS Team of the Week: 14
16	Ciman	Belgium	DF	MLS Team of the Week: 16
19	Toia	United States	DF	MLS Team of the Week: 19
21	Ciman	Belgium	DF	MLS Team of the Week: 21
22	Oduro	Ghana	FW	MLS Team of the Week: 22
27	Drogba	Ivory Coast	FW	MLS Team of the Week: 27
28	Cabrera	Argentina	DF	MLS Team of the Week: 28
29	Drogba	Ivory Coast	FW	MLS Team of the Week: 29
30	Drogba	Ivory Coast	FW	MLS Team of the Week: 30
30	Reo-Coker	England	MF	MLS Team of the Week: 30
33	Bush	United States	GK	MLS Team of the Week: 33
33	Cabrera	Argentina	DF	MLS Team of the Week: 33
34	Drogba	Ivory Coast	FW	MLS Team of the Week: 34

=== MLS Coach of the Week ===
Week	Player	Position	Report
28	Biello	Canada	MLS Player of the Week: 28
34	Biello	Canada	MLS Player of the Week: 34
