= 2016 Montreal Impact season =

Montreal Impact
2016 season
- Owner and President: Joey Saputo
- Coach: Mauro Biello
- MLS Cup Playoffs: Conference Finals
- Canadian Championship: Semi-finals
- Top goalscorer: League: Ignacio Piatti (17); All: Ignacio Piatti (21)
- Highest home attendance: 61,004 (November 22 vs. Toronto FC)
- Lowest home attendance: 16,318 (September 28 vs. San Jose Earthquakes)
- Average home league attendance: 20,669
Home colours	Away colours

The 2016 Montreal Impact season was the club's 23rd season of existence, and their fifth in Major League Soccer, the top tier of the Canadian soccer pyramid. They advanced all the way to the conference final where they lost to Canadian rival Toronto FC.

Outside of MLS regular season play, the club participated in the 2016 Canadian Championship.

== Pre-season friendlies ==
Win Draw Loss

MD	Date, KO EST	Venue	Opponent	Res. F–A	Att.	Goalscorers and disciplined players		Ref.
MD	Date, KO EST	Venue	Opponent	Res. F–A	Att.	Montreal Impact	Opponent	Ref.
1	February 4; 10:30 a.m.	A	New York Red Bulls	0–5			B. Wright-Phillips 31', 34'; Bezecourt 51'; Kljestan 54'; Allen 117'	
2	February 13; 10:30 a.m.	H	FC Montreal	1–1		Williams 80'	Sanon 92'	
3	February 17; 7:00 p.m.	A	New York City FC	0–1			Mullins 75'	
4	February 20; 4:00 p.m.	A	D.C. United	4–1		Oduro 5', 31'; Salazar 18'; Williams 86'	Saborío 36'	
5	February 24; 4:00 p.m.	A	Toronto FC	1–1		Oduro 20'	Hamilton 79'	
6	February 27; 7:00 p.m.	A	Tampa Bay Rowdies	0–0				

== Regular season friendlies ==
Win Draw Loss

MD	Date, KO EST	Venue	Opponent	Res. F–A	Att.	Goalscorers and disciplined players		Ref.
MD	Date, KO EST	Venue	Opponent	Res. F–A	Att.	Montreal Impact	Opponent	Ref.
1	August 3; 7:30 p.m.	H	A.S. Roma	0–2	20,801		Džeko 6'; Nainggolan 21'	

== Major League Soccer ==
=== Tables ===
==== Eastern Conference ====
Pos	Team	Pld	W	L	T	GF	GA	GD	Pts	Qualification
3	Toronto FC	34	14	9	11	51	39	+12	53	MLS Cup Knockout Round
4	D.C. United	34	11	10	13	53	47	+6	46	MLS Cup Knockout Round
5	Montreal Impact	34	11	11	12	49	53	−4	45	MLS Cup Knockout Round
6	Philadelphia Union	34	11	14	9	52	55	−3	42	MLS Cup Knockout Round
7	New England Revolution	34	11	14	9	44	54	−10	42	

Source: MLS

==== Overall ====
Pos	Team	Pld	W	L	T	GF	GA	GD	Pts
9	Real Salt Lake	34	12	12	10	44	46	−2	46
10	D.C. United	34	11	10	13	53	47	+6	46
11	Montreal Impact	34	11	11	12	49	53	−4	45
12	Portland Timbers	34	12	14	8	48	53	−5	44
13	Philadelphia Union	34	11	14	9	52	55	−3	42

Source: MLS
Rules for classification: 1) points; 2) total wins; 3) total goal differential; 4) total goals scored;

=== Results summary ===
Overall								Home						Away					
Pld	Pts	W	L	D	GF	GA	GD	W	L	D	GF	GA	GD	W	L	D	GF	GA	GD
34	45	11	11	12	49	53	−4	7	5	5	31	29	+2	4	6	7	18	24	−6

Last updated: October 25, 2016
Source: 2016 Major League Soccer season
Pld = Matches played; Pts = Points; W = Matches won; D = Matches drawn; L = Matches lost; GF = Goals for; GA = Goals against; GD = Goal difference

=== Fixtures & results ===
Win Draw Loss

MD	Date KO EST	Venue	Opponent	Res. F–A	Att.	Goalscorers and disciplined players		Ref.
MD	Date KO EST	Venue	Opponent	Res. F–A	Att.	Montreal Impact	Opponent	Ref.
1	March 6; 5:30 p.m.	A	Vancouver Whitecaps FC	3–2	22,120	Piatti 19', 88'; Oduro 42'; Oyongo (yellow card) 45'	Harvey 45'; Bolaños (yellow card) 62'; Aird (yellow card) 77'; Waston 90+3'	
2	March 12; 4:00 p.m.	H	New York Red Bulls	3–0	27,545	Cabrera (yellow card) 52'; Oduro 58'; Piatti 71'; Jackson-Hamel 90+4'	McCarty (yellow card) 36'	
3	March 19; 9:00 p.m.	A	FC Dallas	0–2	14,502	Toia (yellow card) 43'	Zimmerman (yellow card) 34'; Figueroa (yellow card) 72'; Díaz 79'; Urruti 87'	
4	April 2; 10:00 p.m.	A	Seattle Sounders FC	0–1	39,705	Camara (yellow card) 64'; Ontivero (yellow card) 75'; Toia (yellow card) 78'	Ivanschitz (yellow card) 68'; Dempsey 79'	
5	April 9; 4:00 p.m.	H	Columbus Crew SC	2–0	22,053	Camara 48'; Bekker 86' (yellow card) 87'; Piatti (yellow card) 53'		
6	April 16; 5:00 p.m.	A	Chicago Fire	2–1	14,509	Drogba 56'; Piatti 90+1'	Igboananike 29'	
7	April 23; 4:00 p.m.	H	Toronto FC	0–2	20,801		Morrow (yellow card) 27'; Giovinco 40', 81'	
8	April 27; 7:00 p.m.	A	New York City FC	1–1	23,252	Piatti (yellow card) 43'; Donadel (yellow card) 65'; Bernier (yellow card) 79'; Lefevre (yellow card) 89'; Oduro 90+1'	Lopez (yellow card) 29'; Bravo (yellow card) 35'; Allen 51'; White (yellow card) 78'	
9	April 30; 4:00 p.m.	H	Colorado Rapids	2–2	20,801	Drogba 9'; Tissot 50'; Ciman (yellow card) 66'	Hairston (yellow card) 45'; Gashi 47' (yellow card) 78'; Sjöberg (yellow card) 61'; Burling 73'	
10	May 7; 7:30 p.m.	A	Columbus Crew SC	4–4	14,095	Piatti 26', 58'; Drogba 57' (pen.); Ontivero (yellow card) 82'; Oduro 90+3'	Kamara 16', 45+1'; Higuaín 48', 53' (pen.); Francis (yellow card) 82'	
11	May 14; 5:00 p.m.	H	Philadelphia Union	1–1	20,801	Drogba 3'; Piatti (yellow card) 36'; Donadel (yellow card) 50'; Oyongo (yellow card) 80'	Sapong 34'; Gaddis (yellow card) 81'	
12	May 21; 7:30 p.m.	A	Orlando City SC	1–2	34,081	Piatti 4'; Bush (yellow card) 45+1'	Winter (yellow card) 13'; Shea (yellow card) 41'; Larin 43', 87'; Rivas (yellow card) 45+2'; Higuita (yellow card) 53'; Alston (yellow card) 66'	
13	May 28; 8:00 p.m.	H	LA Galaxy	3–2	20,801	Piatti 26'; Ontivero 56'; Bernier (yellow card) 68'; Drogba 90+4' (yellow card) 90+5'	Santos 8'; Magee 58'; Gordon (yellow card) 90+2'; Steres (yellow card) 90+4'	
14	June 18; 7:30 p.m.	A	Columbus Crew SC	0–0	14,814	Drogba (yellow card) 59'; Camara (yellow card) 90+2'	Ashe (yellow card) 14'; Wahl (yellow card) 68'; Tchani (yellow card) 68'	
15	June 25; 7:30 p.m.	H	Sporting Kansas City	2-2	20,032	Ontivero 16' (yellow card) 24'; Piatti 39' (pen.); Oyongo (yellow card) 43'; Drogba (yellow card) 55'	Dwyer 21' 59'; Medranda (yellow card) 38'	
16	July 2; 5:30 p.m.	H	New England Revolution	3-2	20,279	Salazar 40' 48'; Piatti 54' (pen.)	Kamara 18' 33'; Knighton (yellow card) 53'; Caldwell (yellow card) 55'	
17	July 9; 10:00 p.m.	A	Real Salt Lake	1-1	20,086	Shipp 8'; Cabrera (yellow card) 16'	Wingert (yellow card) 62'; Glad (yellow card) 70'; Beckerman (yellow card) 76'; Movsisyan 79' (pen.)	
18	July 13; 10:30 p.m.	A	Portland Timbers	1-1	21,144	Piatti (yellow card) 18' (goal) 44'; Shipp (yellow card) 68'; Camara (yellow card) 70'	McInerney 14'; Adi (yellow card) 70'	
19	July 17; 5:00 p.m.	H	New York City FC	1-3	20,801	Camara (yellow card) 50'; Shipp 55'; Ontivero (yellow card) 61'; Cabrera (yellow card) 74'	Villa 35'; Harrison 45+2'; Lopez (yellow card) 72'; Lampard 85'; Saunders (yellow card) 88'	
20	July 23; 7:30 p.m.	H	Philadelphia Union	5-1	20,801	Drogba 19' 42' 52'; Salazar (yellow card) 26'; Mallace (yellow card) 50'; Bernier (yellow card) 83'; Piatti 87'; Mancosu 90+1'	Barnetta (yellow card) 27'; Pontius 72'; Gaddis (yellow card) 76'	
21	July 31; 6:00 p.m.	A	D.C. United	1-1	16,728	Bekker (yellow card) 54'; Drogba (red card) 81'; Bernardello 86' (yellow card) 90+2'	Mullins 20' (yellow card) 77'; Sarvas (yellow card) 25'	
22	August 6; 7:30 p.m.	H	Houston Dynamo	1-0	20,801	Mancosu 76'; Bernardello (yellow card) 86'	Horst (yellow card) 41'; Williams (yellow card) 61'	
23	August 13; 7:00 p.m.	A	New York Red Bulls	1-3	23,459	Piatti 21'; Oyongo (red card) 48'; Bernardello (yellow card) 50'; Mallace (yellow card) 69'	Collin (yellow card) 14'; Wright-Phillips 22' 41'; Davis 46'; Muyl (yellow card) 87'	
24	August 20; 7:30 p.m.	H	Chicago Fire	0-3	20,801	Ciman (yellow card) 44'; Drogba (yellow card) 71'	Solignac 15' (yellow card) 31'; Accam 73'; Polster 89'	
25	August 24; 7:30 p.m.	H	D.C. United	1-1	19,740	Bush (yellow card) 36'; Camara 77'	Birnbaum (yellow card) 8'; Neagle 39' (pen.); Sarvas (yellow card) 63'; Igboananike (yellow card) 67'; Opare (red card) 89'	
26	August 27; 7:30 p.m.	A	Toronto FC	1-0	28,454	Mallace (red card) 43'; Piatti 73'; Bush (yellow card) 73'; Mancosu (yellow card) 81'; Bekker (yellow card) 90+1'	Delgado (yellow card) 44'; Zavaleta (yellow card) 46'; Osorio (yellow card) 70'	
27	September 7; 7:30 p.m.	H	Orlando City SC	1-4	17,389	Drogba 2'; Bernier (yellow card) 51'; Bush (red card) 51'; Bernardello (yellow card) 84'	Shea 4' (yellow card) 45'; Kaká 36' 54' (pen.); Carrasco (yellow card) 55'; Rivas 77' (yellow card) 89'	
28	September 10; 7:00 p.m.	A	Philadelphia Union	1-1	18,500	Ciman (yellow card) 48'; Camara (yellow card) 60'; Mancosu 88'	Pontius (yellow card) 34'; Barnetta 45'; Sapong (yellow card) 54'	
29	September 17; 7:30 p.m.	H	New England Revolution	1-3	20,801	Shipp (yellow card) 41'; Drogba 50' (pen.); Cabrera (yellow card) 54'	Kamara 1'; Rowe 27' 59'; Gonçalves (yellow card) 39'; Gonçalves (yellow card) 39'	
30	September 24; 7:00 p.m.	A	New York Red Bulls	0-1	22,209	Cabrera (yellow card) 22'; Oyongo (yellow card) 45+3'; Bernardello (yellow card) 56'; Donadel (yellow card) 81'	Kljestan (yellow card) 56'; Royer 60'	
31	September 28; 7:30 p.m.	H	San Jose Earthquakes	3-1	16,318	Oduro 22'; Piatti 32' (yellow card) 86'; Camara (yellow card) 50'; Cabrera (yellow card) 56'; Venegas (yellow card) 86' (goal) 90+2'; Drogba (yellow card) 90+1'	Francis (yellow card) 12'; Wondolowski 62'	
32	October 2; 1:00 p.m.	A	Orlando City SC	1-0	26,041	Oduro 56'; Fisher (yellow card) 65'	Boden (yellow card) 77'	
33	October 16; 3:00 p.m.	H	Toronto FC	2-2	20,801	Piatti 19' 55' (pen.); Donadel (yellow card) 59'	Bradley (yellow card) 25'; Beitashour (yellow card) 45+1'; Altidore 51'; Giovinco (yellow card) 68'; Moor (yellow card) 78'; Ricketts 86'	
34	October 23; 4:00 p.m.	A	New England Revolution	0-3	39,587	Mallace (yellow card) 55'; Oduro (yellow card) 64'; Venegas (yellow card) 83'	Fagúndez 13'; Agudelo (yellow card) 56' (goal) 60'; Kamara 71' (yellow card) 72'	

== MLS Cup Playoffs ==
Win Draw Loss

Leg	Date – KO EST	Venue	Opponent	Res. F–A	Agg. score F–A	Att.	Goalscorers and disciplined player		Ref.
Leg	Date – KO EST	Venue	Opponent	Res. F–A	Agg. score F–A	Att.	Montreal Impact	Opponent	Ref.
Knockout Round
	October 27; 7:30 p.m.	A	D.C. United	—	4-2	12,773	Ciman 4'; Mancosu 43' 58'; Piatti 83'	Neagle 89'; Kemp 90+4'	
Conference Semi-final
FL	October 30, 3:00 p.m.	H	New York Red Bulls	1-0	—	15,027	Camara (yellow card) 13'; Mancosu 61'	Felipe (yellow card) 13'; Damari (red card) 90+3'	
SL	November 6, 4:00 p.m.	A	New York Red Bulls	2-1	3-1	24,314	Piatti 51' 85'; Bush (yellow card) 56'; Ciman (yellow card) 63'; Venegas (yellow card) 90+2'	Felipe (yellow card) 19'; McCarty (yellow card) 74'; Wright-Phillips 77'; Kljestan (yellow card) 89'	
Conference Final
FL	November 22, 8:00 p.m.	H	Toronto FC	3-2	—	61,004	Oduro 10'; Mancosu 12'; Oyongo 63'	Altidore 68'; Bradley 73'	
SL	November 30, 8:00 p.m.	A	Toronto FC	2-5	5-7	36,000			

== Canadian Championship ==
=== Canadian Championship review ===
Preliminary round
FC Edmonton	0	2	2
Ottawa Fury FC	3	0	3

Semifinals
1	Vancouver Whitecaps FC	0	3	3
4	Ottawa Fury FC	2	0	2
2	Montreal Impact	2	0	2
3	Toronto FC	4	0	4

Final
1	Vancouver Whitecaps FC	0	2	2
3	Toronto FC (a)	1	1	2

=== Canadian Championship results ===
Win Draw Loss

Leg	Date KO EST	Venue	Opponent	Res. F–A	Agg. score F–A	Att.	Goalscorers and disciplined player		Ref.
Leg	Date KO EST	Venue	Opponent	Res. F–A	Agg. score F–A	Att.	Montreal Impact	Opponent	Ref.
Semi–final
FL	June 1; 8:00 p.m.	A	Toronto FC	2–4	—	22,143	Bernier (red card) 45+2'; Salazar 86'; Drogba 90+1'	Osorio 13' 34'; Hamilton 60' 80'; Irwin (yellow card) 90+2'	
SL	June 8; 8:00 p.m.	H	Toronto FC	0–0	2–4	18,964	Drogba (yellow card) 50'; Ontivero (red card) 60'; Oduro (yellow card) 88'	Zavaleta (yellow card) 45'	

== Player information ==
=== Squad information ===
No.	Name	Nationality	Position	Date of birth (age at year end)	Previous club
Goalkeepers
1	Evan Bush	US	GK	March 6, 1986 (age 40)	(Canada) Montreal Impact (NASL)
22	Eric Kronberg	US	GK	June 7, 1983 (age 42)	(United States) Sporting Kansas City
40	Maxime Crépeau	CAN	GK	May 11, 1994 (age 31)	(Canada) Montreal Impact Academy
Defenders
2	Ambroise Oyongo	(Cameroon) CAM	LB	June 22, 1991 (age 34)	(United States) New York Red Bulls
3	Amadou Dia	US	CB	June 8, 1993 (age 32)	(United States) Sporting Kansas City
5	Wandrille Lefèvre	CAN	CB	December 17, 1989 (age 36)	(Canada) Montreal Impact Academy
6	Hassoun Camara	FRA	CB\RB	February 3, 1984 (age 42)	(Canada) Montreal Impact (NASL)
23	Laurent Ciman	BEL	CB	August 5, 1985 (age 40)	(Belgium) Standard Liège
25	Donny Toia	US	LB	May 28, 1992 (age 33)	(United States) Chivas USA
26	Kyle Fisher	US	CB	June 19, 1994 (age 31)	(United States) Clemson Tigers
36	Víctor Cabrera	ARG	CB	February 7, 1993 (age 33)	(Argentina) River Plate
Midfielders
8	Patrice Bernier	CAN	DM	September 23, 1979 (age 46)	(Denmark) Lyngby Boldklub
10	Ignacio Piatti	ARG	AM	February 4, 1985 (age 41)	(Argentina) San Lorenzo de Almagro
14	Harry Shipp	US	AM	November 7, 1991 (age 34)	(United States) Chicago Fire
16	Calum Mallace	SCO	DM	October 1, 1990 (age 35)	(United States) Marquette Golden Eagles
17	David Choinière	CAN	LM	February 7, 1997 (age 29)	(Canada) FC Montreal
18	Kyle Bekker	CAN	CM	September 2, 1990 (age 35)	(United States) FC Dallas
27	Johan Venegas	CRC	CAM/LW	July 11, 1988 (age 37)	(Costa Rica) Alajuelense
28	Jérémy Gagnon-Laparé	CAN	DM	March 9, 1995 (age 31)	(Canada) Montreal Impact Academy
30	Hernán Bernardello	ARG	DM	August 3, 1986 (age 39)	(Spain) Deportivo Alavés
32	Lucas Ontivero	ARG	LW/RW	September 9, 1994 (age 31)	(Turkey) Galatasaray
33	Marco Donadel	ITA	DM	April 21, 1983 (age 42)	(Italy) Napoli
Attackers
7	Dominic Oduro	GHA	ST	August 13, 1985 (age 40)	(Canada) Toronto FC
11	Didier Drogba	(Ivory Coast) IVC	ST	March 11, 1978 (age 47)	(England) Chelsea F.C.
15	Andrés Romero	ARG	ST	October 29, 1989 (age 36)	(Brazil) Tombense
19	Michael Salazar	BLZ	ST	October 15, 1992 (age 33)	(United States) UC Riverside Highlanders
21	Matteo Mancosu	ITA	ST	December 22, 1984 (age 41)	(Italy) Bologna F.C. 1909
24	Anthony Jackson-Hamel	CAN	ST	August 3, 1993 (age 32)	(Canada) Montreal Impact Academy

=== Squad and statistics ===
==== Appearances, minutes played, and goals scored ====
No.	Nat.	Player	Total			Major League Soccer			Canadian Championship			MLS Playoffs			Ref.
No.	Nat.	Player	App.	Min.	Gls	App.	Min.	Gls	App.	Min.	Gls	App.	Min.	Gls	Ref.
Goalkeepers
1	(United States)	Evan Bush	38	3412	0	33	2932	0	0	0	0	5	480	0	
22	(United States)	Eric Kronberg	4	308	0	2	128	0	2	180	0	0	0	0	
40	(Canada)	Maxime Crépeau	0	0	0	0	0	0	0	0	0	0	0	0	
Defenders
2	(Cameroon)	Ambroise Oyongo	33	2883	1	27	2316	0	1	87	0	5	480	1	
3	(United States)	Amadou Dia	1	90	0	1	90	0	0	0	0	0	0	0	
5	(Canada)	Wandrille Lefèvre	16	1299	0	13	1113	0	2	180	0	1	6	0	
6	(France)	Hassoun Camara	34	2900	2	27	2249	2	2	180	0	5	471	0	
23	(Belgium)	Laurent Ciman	33	2964	1	28	2484	0	0	0	0	5	480	1	
25	(United States)	Donny Toia	18	1374	0	17	1365	0	0	0	0	1	9	0	
26	(United States)	Kyle Fisher	3	270	0	2	180	0	1	90	0	0	0	0	
36	(Argentina)	Víctor Cabrera	29	2496	0	23	1926	0	1	90	0	5	480	0	
Midfielders
8	(Canada)	Patrice Bernier	26	1645	0	20	1185	0	1	45	0	5	415	0	
10	(Argentina)	Ignacio Piatti	38	3382	21	32	2818	17	1	90	0	5	474	4	
14	(United States)	Harry Shipp	30	1670	2	27	1595	2	1	57	0	2	18	0	
16	(Scotland)	Calum Mallace	21	926	0	18	861	0	0	0	0	3	65	0	
17	(Canada)	David Choinière	2	79	0	1	76	0	1	3	0	0	0	0	
18	(Canada)	Kyle Bekker	120	1296	1	18	1139	1	2	157	0	0	0	0	
27	(Costa Rica)	Johan Venegas	25	791	1	20	683	1	0	0	0	5	108	0	
28	(Canada)	Jérémy Gagnon-Laparé	1	79	0	0	0	0	1	79	0	0	0	0	
30	(Argentina)	Hernán Bernardello	16	1286	1	12	992	1	0	0	0	5	382	0	
32	(Argentina)	Lucas Ontivero	23	1084	2	21	979	2	2	105	0	0	0	0	
33	(Italy)	Marco Donadel	26	1984	0	21	1516	0	0	0	0	5	468	0	
Forwards
7	(Ghana)	Dominic Oduro	38	2592	8	31	2028	6	2	100	0	5	464	2	
11	(Ivory Coast)	Didier Drogba	27	1906	11	22	1650	10	2	180	1	3	76	0	
15	(Argentina)	Andrés Romero	0	0	0	0	0	0	0	0	0	0	0	0	
19	(Belize)	Michael Salazar	19	824	3	17	711	2	2	113	1	0	0	0	
21	(Italy)	Matteo Mancosu	20	1096	7	15	772	3	0	0	0	5	404	4	
24	(Canada)	Anthony Jackson-Hamel	7	171	1	7	171	1	0	0	0	0	0	0	
No Longer with the Club
29	(United States)	Eric Alexander	14	1182	0	12	1047	0	2	135	0	0	0	0	
39	(United States)	Cameron Porter	2	34	0	0	0	0	2	34	0	0	0	0	
51	(Canada)	Maxim Tissot	8	607	1	7	517	1	1	90	0	0	0	0	
Last updated: December 1, 2016

==== Top scorers ====
No.	Nat.	Player	Pos.	Major League Soccer	Canadian Championship	MLS Playoffs	TOTAL
10	(Argentina)	Ignacio Piatti	MF	17		4	21
11	(Ivory Coast)	Didier Drogba	FW	10	1		11
7	(Ghana)	Dominic Oduro	FW	6		2	8
21	(Italy)	Matteo Mancosu	FW	3		4	7
19	(Belize)	Michael Salazar	FW	2	1		3
6	(France)	Hassoun Camara	DF	2			2
14	(United States)	Harry Shipp	MF	2			2
32	(Argentina)	Lucas Ontivero	MF	2			2
2	(Cameroon)	Ambroise Oyongo	DF			1	1
18	(Canada)	Kyle Bekker	MF	1			1
23	(Belgium)	Laurent Ciman	DF			1	1
24	(Canada)	Anthony Jackson-Hamel	FW	1			1
27	(Costa Rica)	Johan Venegas	MF	1			1
30	(Argentina)	Hernán Bernardello	MF	1			1
51	(Canada)	Maxim Tissot	MF	1			1
Totals				49	2	12	63

Updated to match played December 1, 2016
Source: Montreal Impact
Italic: denotes player left the club during the season.

==== Top assists ====
No.	Nat.	Player	Pos.	Major League Soccer	Canadian Championship	MLS Playoffs	TOTAL
7	(Ghana)	Dominic Oduro	FW	6		3	9
10	(Argentina)	Ignacio Piatti	MF	6		2	8
11	(Ivory Coast)	Didier Drogba	FW	6	1	1	8
2	(Cameroon)	Ambroise Oyongo	DF	5		1	6
21	(Italy)	Matteo Mancosu	FW	4		2	6
33	(Italy)	Marco Donadel	MF	4		2	6
8	(Canada)	Patrice Bernier	MF	1		2	3
14	(United States)	Harry Shipp	MF	3			3
6	(France)	Hassoun Camara	DF	2			2
25	(United States)	Donny Toia	DF	2			2
27	(Costa Rica)	Johan Venegas	MF	1		1	2
32	(Argentina)	Lucas Ontivero	MF	2			2
30	(Argentina)	Hernán Bernardello	MF	1			1
29	(United States)	Eric Alexander	MF	1			1
Totals				44	1	14	59

Updated to match played December 1, 2016
Source: Montreal Impact
Italic: denotes player left the club during the season.

==== Top minutes played ====
No.	Nat.	Player	Pos.	Major League Soccer	Canadian Championship	MLS Playoffs	TOTAL
1	(United States)	Evan Bush	GK	2932		480	3412
10	(Argentina)	Ignacio Piatti	MF	2818	90	474	3382
23	(Belgium)	Laurent Ciman	DF	2484		480	2964
6	(France)	Hassoun Camara	DF	2249	180	471	2900
2	(Cameroon)	Ambroise Oyongo	DF	2316	87	480	2883
7	(Ghana)	Dominic Oduro	FW	2028	100	464	2592
36	(Argentina)	Víctor Cabrera	DF	1926	90	480	2496
33	(Italy)	Marco Donadel	MF	1516		468	1984
11	(Ivory Coast)	Didier Drogba	FW	1650	180	76	1906
14	(United States)	Harry Shipp	MF	1595	57	18	1670

Updated to match played December 1, 2016
Source: Montreal Impact
Italic: denotes player left the club during the season.

==== Multi–goal games ====
No.	Pos.	Player	Date	Opponent	Number of Goals	Source
10	MF	(Argentina) Ignacio Piatti	March 6, 2016	vs Vancouver Whitecaps FC	2	
10	MF	(Argentina) Ignacio Piatti	May 7, 2016	vs Columbus Crew SC	2	
19	FW	(Belize) Michael Salazar	July 2, 2016	vs New England Revolution	2	
11	FW	(Ivory Coast) Didier Drogba	July 23, 2016	vs Philadelphia Union	3	
10	MF	(Argentina) Ignacio Piatti	October 16, 2016	vs Toronto FC	2	
21	FW	(Italy) Matteo Mancosu	October 27, 2016	vs D.C. United	2	
10	MF	(Argentina) Ignacio Piatti	November 6, 2016	vs New York Red Bulls	2	

==== Goals against average ====
No.	Nat.	Player	Total			Major League Soccer			Canadian Championship			MLS Playoffs		
No.	Nat.	Player	MIN	GA	GAA	MIN	GA	GAA	MIN	GA	GAA	MIN	GA	GAA
1	US	Evan Bush	3412	60	1.58	2932	50	1.52	0	0	0.00	480	10	1.87
22	US	Eric Kronberg	308	7	2.05	128	3	2.11	180	4	2.00	0	0	0.00
40	CAN	Maxime Crépeau	0	0	0.00	0	0	0.00	0	0	0.00	0	0	0.00

Updated to match played December 1, 2016
Source: Montreal Impact
Italic: denotes player left the club during the season.

==== Clean sheets ====
No.	Nat.	Player	Major League Soccer	Canadian Championship	MLS Cup Playoffs	TOTAL
1	(United States)	Evan Bush	6		1	7
22	(United States)	Eric Kronberg		1		1
Totals			6	1	1	8

Updated to match played October 31, 2016
Source: Montreal Impact

==== Yellow and red cards ====
No.	Player	Total			Major League Soccer			Canadian Championship			MLS Cup Playoffs			Ref.
No.	Player	Booked	(yellow card) (red card)	Sent off (straight red)	Booked	(yellow card) (red card)	Sent off (straight red)	Booked	(yellow card) (red card)	Sent off (straight red)	Booked	(yellow card) (red card)	Sent off (straight red)	Ref.
1	Evan Bush	4	0	1	3	0	1	0	0	0	1	0	0	
2	Ambroise Oyongo	4	0	1	4	0	1	0	0	0	0	0	0	
3	Amadou Dia	0	0	0	0	0	0	0	0	0	0	0	0	
5	Wandrille Lefèvre	1	0	0	1	0	0	0	0	0	0	0	0	
6	Hassoun Camara	8	0	0	6	0	0	0	0	0	2	0	0	
7	Dominic Oduro	2	0	0	1	0	0	1	0	0	0	0	0	
8	Patrice Bernier	4	0	1	4	0	0	0	0	1	0	0	0	
10	Ignacio Piatti	5	0	0	5	0	0	0	0	0	0	0	0	
11	Didier Drogba	6	0	1	5	0	1	1	0	0	0	0	0	
14	Harry Shipp	2	0	0	2	0	0	0	0	0	0	0	0	
15	Andrés Romero	0	0	0	0	0	0	0	0	0	0	0	0	
16	Calum Mallace	3	0	1	3	0	1	0	0	0	0	0	0	
17	David Choinière	0	0	0	0	0	0	0	0	0	0	0	0	
18	Kyle Bekker	3	0	0	3	0	0	0	0	0	0	0	0	
19	Michael Salazar	1	0	0	1	0	0	0	0	0	0	0	0	
21	Matteo Mancosu	1	0	0	1	0	0	0	0	0	0	0	0	
22	Eric Kronberg	0	0	0	0	0	0	0	0	0	0	0	0	
23	Laurent Ciman	5	0	0	3	0	0	0	0	0	2	0	0	
24	Anthony Jackson-Hamel	0	0	0	0	0	0	0	0	0	0	0	0	
25	Donny Toia	2	0	0	2	0	0	0	0	0	0	0	0	
26	Kyle Fisher	1	0	0	1	0	0	0	0	0	0	0	0	
27	Johan Venegas	3	0	0	2	0	0	0	0	0	1	0	0	
28	Jérémy Gagnon-Laparé	0	0	0	0	0	0	0	0	0	0	0	0	
29	Eric Alexander	0	0	0	0	0	0	0	0	0	0	0	0	
30	Hernán Bernardello	5	0	0	5	0	0	0	0	0	0	0	0	
32	Lucas Ontivero	4	0	1	4	0	0	0	0	1	0	0	0	
33	Marco Donadel	4	0	0	4	0	0	0	0	0	0	0	0	
36	Víctor Cabrera	6	0	0	6	0	0	0	0	0	0	0	0	
39	Cameron Porter	0	0	0	0	0	0	0	0	0	0	0	0	
40	Maxime Crépeau	0	0	0	0	0	0	0	0	0	0	0	0	
51	Maxim Tissot	0	0	0	0	0	0	0	0	0	0	0	0	
Totals		71	0	6	63	0	4	2	0	2	6	0	0	
Last updated: December 1, 2016

=== International roster slots ===
Montreal has ten MLS International Roster Slots for use in the 2016 season. Each club in Major League Soccer is allocated eight international roster spots. Montreal has two extra spot from transactions with the Portland Timbers and Toronto FC.

Montreal Impact International slots
Slot	Player	Nationality
1	Laurent Ciman	Belgium
2	Didier Drogba	Ivory Coast
3	Marco Donadel	Italy
4	Matteo Mancosu	Italy
5	Ambroise Oyongo	Cameroon
6	Johan Venegas	Costa Rica
7	Ignacio Piatti	Argentina
8	Víctor Cabrera	Argentina
9	Lucas Ontivero	Argentina
10	Hernán Bernardello	Argentina
IR	Andrés Romero	Argentina

Foreign-Born Players with Domestic Status
Player	Nationality
Calum Mallace	Scotland / (United States)
Dominic Oduro	(Ghana) Ghana^{G}
Wandrille Lefèvre	France / Canada
Michael Salazar	Belize ^{G}
Hassoun Camara	France ^{C}

- (Canada) – Player is a Canadian citizen;
- (United States) – Player is a US citizen;
- G – Player has a US green card;
- C – Player has permanent Canadian residency.

== Transfers ==
=== In ===
No.	Pos.	Player	Transferred from	Fee/notes	Date	Source
26	DF	(United States) Kyle Fisher	(United States) Clemson Tigers	2016 MLS SuperDraft	January 14, 2016	
36	DF	(Argentina) Víctor Cabrera	(Argentina) Club Atlético River Plate	Purchased after loan spell	January 23, 2016	
14	MF	(United States) Harry Shipp	(United States) Chicago Fire	Traded for General and Targeted Allocation Money	February 13, 2016	
19	FW	(Belize) Michael Salazar	(United States) UC Riverside Highlanders	2016 MLS SuperDraft	March 1, 2016	
17	MF	(Canada) David Choinière	(Canada) FC Montreal	Signed as a Homegrown Player	June 28, 2016	
3	DF	(United States) Amadou Dia	(United States) Sporting Kansas City	Traded for Cameron Porter	July 12, 2016	
30	MF	(Argentina) Hernán Bernardello	(Spain) Deportivo Alavés	Free Transfer	July 24, 2016	

=== Out ===
No.	Pos.	Player	Transferred to	Fee/notes	Date	Source
13	FW	(United States) Kenny Cooper	Retired		December 7, 2015	
21	MF	(United States) Justin Mapp	(United States) Sporting Kansas City	Free Agent	December 14, 2015	
14	MF	(England) Nigel Reo-Coker	(Norway) IK Start	Released	January 22, 2016	
3	DF	(United States) Eric Miller	(United States) Colorado Rapids	Trade for a 2018 1st round MLS SuperDraft pick and Allocation money	February 14, 2016	
5	MF	(United States) Dilly Duka	(United States) Columbus Crew SC	Trade for a 2017 2nd round MLS SuperDraft pick and Allocation and TAM money	June 20, 2016	
51	MF	(Canada) Maxim Tissot	(Canada) Ottawa Fury	Waived	June 28, 2016	
39	FW	(United States) Cameron Porter	(United States) Sporting Kansas City	Traded for Amadou Dia	July 12, 2016	
29	MF	(United States) Eric Alexander	(United States) Houston Dynamo	Traded for Allocation Money	July 22, 2016	

=== Loans in ===
No.	Pos.	Player	Loaned from	Loan start date	Loan end date	Source
32	MF	(Argentina) Lucas Ontivero	(Turkey) Galatasaray	January 18, 2016	December 31, 2016	
67	DF	(Canada) David Choinière	(Canada) FC Montreal	June 1, 2016	June 9, 2016	
21	FW	(Italy) Matteo Mancosu	(Italy) Bologna	July 7, 2016	June 30, 2017	

=== Loans out ===
No.	Pos.	Player	Loaned to	Loan start date	Loan end date	Source
17	FW	(Jamaica) Romario Williams	(United States) Charleston Battery	March 1, 2016	December 31, 2016	

=== Draft picks ===
Round	No.	Pos.	Player	College/Club team	Transaction	Source
1(14)	26	DF	(United States) Kyle Fisher	(United States) Clemson Tigers men's soccer	Signed prior to the draft	
2(24)	19	FW	(Belize) Michael Salazar	(United States) UC Riverside Highlanders	Signed	
2(34)		MF	(United States) Eric Verso	(United States) Stanford University	Released from try-out, Signed with (United States) Rio Grande Valley FC Toros	
2(39)		FW	(United States) Keegan Smith	(United States) University of San Diego	Released from try-out, Signed with (United States) Orlando City B	
3(55)		DF	(United States) Brendan Hines-Ike	(United States) University of South Florida	Signed with (Sweden) Örebro SK	

== Recognition ==
=== MLS Best XI ===
Player	Nation	Position	Report
Piatti	Argentina	MF	MLS Best XI

=== MLS Player of the Week ===
Week	Player	Nation	Position	Report
10	Piatti	Argentina	MF	MLS Player of the Week: 10

=== MLS Team of the Week ===
Week	Player	Nation	Position	Report
1	Piatti	Argentina	MF	MLS Team of the Week: 1
2	Piatti	Argentina	MF	MLS Team of the Week: 2
2	Ciman	Belgium	DF	MLS Team of the Week: 2
6	Piatti	Argentina	MF	MLS Team of the Week: 6
6	Ciman	Belgium	DF	MLS Team of the Week: 6
7	Piatti	Argentina	MF	MLS Team of the Week: 7
7	Ciman	Belgium	DF	MLS Team of the Week: 7
9	Drogba	Ivory Coast	FW	MLS Team of the Week: 9
10	Piatti	Argentina	MF	MLS Team of the Week: 10
13	Piatti	Argentina	MF	MLS Team of the Week: 13
13	Drogba	Ivory Coast	FW	MLS Team of the Week: 13
17	Salazar	Belize	FW	MLS Team of the Week: 17
20	Piatti	Argentina	MF	MLS Team of the Week: 20
20	Drogba	Ivory Coast	FW	MLS Team of the Week: 20
20	Oyongo	Cameroon	DF	MLS Team of the Week: 20
22	Bush	United States	GK	MLS Team of the Week: 22
25	Camara	France	DF	MLS Team of the Week: 25
30	Bush	United States	GK	MLS Team of the Week: 30
30	Ciman	Belgium	DF	MLS Team of the Week: 30
30	Oduro	Ghana	FW	MLS Team of the Week: 30
32/33	Piatti	Argentina	MF	MLS Team of the Week: 32/33

=== MLS Goal of the Week ===
Week	Player	Nation	Position	Report
1	Piatti	Argentina	MF	MLS Goal of the Week: 1
7	Piatti	Argentina	MF	MLS Goal of the Week: 7
9	Tissot	Canada	DF	MLS Goal of the Week: 9
10	Piatti	Argentina	MF	MLS Goal of the Week: 10
20	Piatti	Argentina	MF	MLS Goal of the Week: 20
32/33	Piatti	Argentina	MF	MLS Goal of the Week: 32/33

=== MLS Save of the Week ===
Week	Player	Nation	Position	Report
1	Bush	United States	GK	MLS Save of the Week: 1
