= Kyle Bekker =

Canadian soccer player (born 1990)

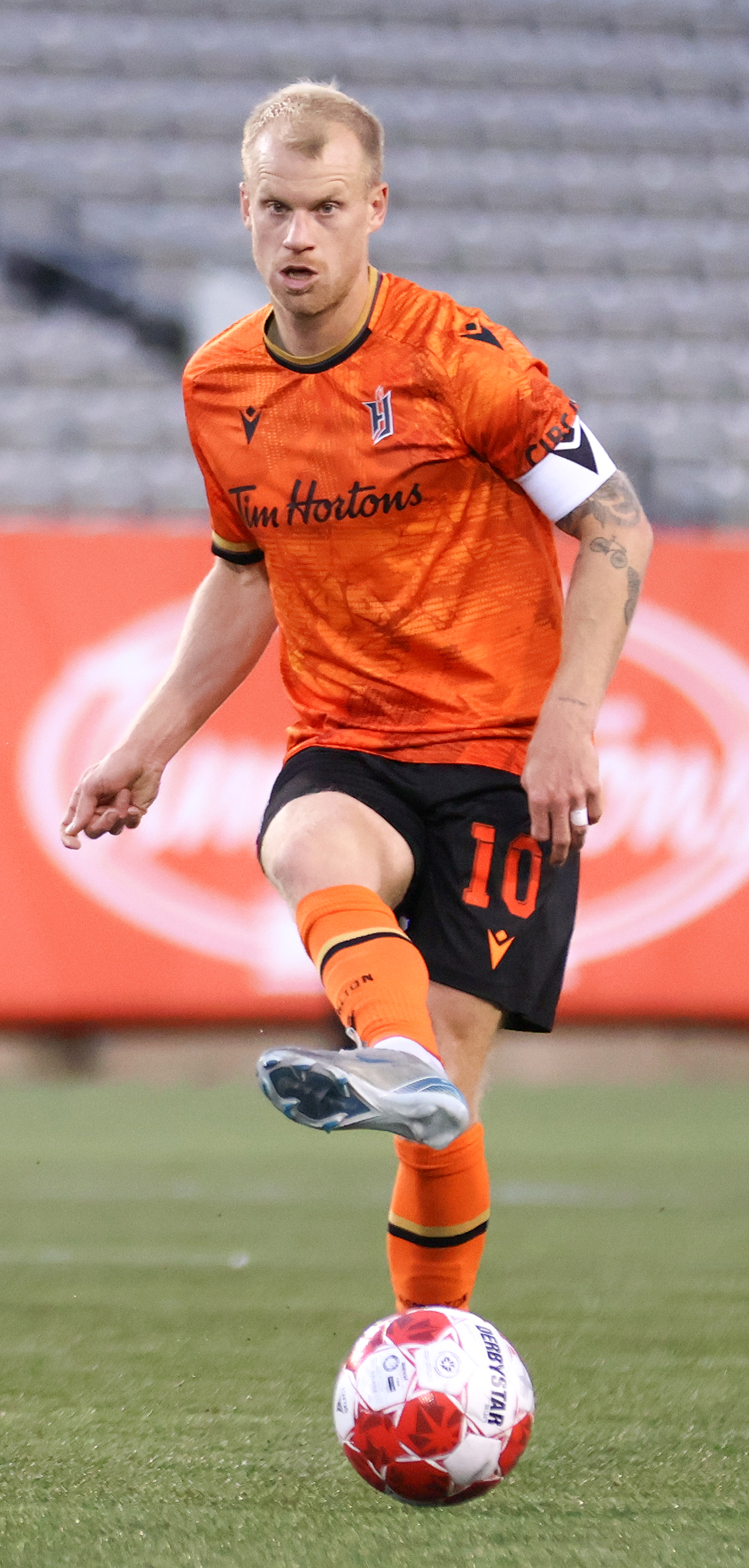
- Bekker playing for Forge FC in 2024

Personal information
- Full name: Kyle Edward Bekker
- Date of birth: September 2, 1990 (age 36)
- Place of birth: Oakville, Ontario, Canada
- Height: 1.78 m (5 ft 10 in)
- Position: Midfielder

Youth career
- Oakville SC
- 2006–2007: Mississauga Dixie Dominators
- 2007–2009: Sigma FC

College career
Years	Team	Apps	(Gls)
2009–2012	Boston College Eagles	80	(17)

Senior career*
Years	Team	Apps	(Gls)
2013–2014	Toronto FC	29	(0)
2015	FC Dallas	8	(0)
2015	FC Montreal	1	(0)
2015–2016	Montreal Impact	21	(2)
2017	San Francisco Deltas	28	(3)
2018	North Carolina FC	33	(7)
2019–2026	Forge FC	179	(21)
Total		299	(33)

International career
2012	Canada U23	4	(0)
2013–2017	Canada	18	(0)
- * Club domestic league appearances and goals

Kyle Edward Bekker (born September 2, 1990) is a Canadian former professional soccer midfielder. He played most of his career in the Canadian Premier League where he captained Forge FC from 2019 until his retirement in 2026.

Bekker played parts of four seasons in Major League Soccer between three different clubs. He also made 18 appearances for the Canada men's national soccer team.

== Club career ==
=== Youth ===
Bekker was born in Oakville, Ontario and began his youth soccer career with Oakville SC, winning back-to-back Ontario Cup Championships in 2004 and 2005 and a National Championship in 2004. In 2006, he moved onto the Mississauga Dixie Dominators, where he won the Ontario Cup in 2006 and 2007 adding another National Championship in 2006. In 2007, he also played with Sigma FC, where in March of that year, his team played eight matches in the Netherlands against professional youth academies. His time over there earned him a trial with Ajax's youth academy, which ended up lasting six weeks until his inability to receive a European work permit led to his return to Canada.

At 18, helped Sigma FC climb the ranks for the Ontario Soccer League Men's Divisions. Over his four years in the OSL, Bekker scored 28 goals and registered 35 assists. He played with former Toronto FC teammate Emery Welshman during this period.

Bekker eventually received interest from colleges in the United States before accepting a scholarship to attend Boston College. During his four years there, Bekker played in 80 games, starting, with 17 goals and 22 assists. He picked up several awards on his way, including ACC All-Freshman-Team in 2009, and ACC All-First-Team in 2011 and 2012.

Bekker trained with Toronto FC during the summer of 2011, and then trained with Montreal Impact and Seattle Sounders in the Summer of 2012. He had a trial with Crystal Palace in December 2012, before work permit issues led to signing a pro contract with MLS and entering the MLS Draft.

=== Toronto FC ===
Bekker signed a contract with MLS on January 6, 2013. He was drafted third overall in the 2013 MLS SuperDraft by Toronto FC on January 17, 2013. Bekker made his debut for Toronto on March 2, in a 1–0 away defeat to Vancouver Whitecaps FC.

=== FC Dallas ===
On January 21, 2015, Bekker was transferred to FC Dallas. He made his debut for Dallas as a substitute for Fabian Castillo on March 14 in a 3–1 victory against Sporting Kansas City.

=== Montreal Impact ===
On July 16, 2015, Bekker was traded to Montreal Impact in exchange for Bakary Soumare. Bekker was released by Montreal on December 9, 2016.

=== San Francisco Deltas ===
After four seasons in MLS, Bekker signed with the San Francisco Deltas of the NASL. In their inaugural season, the club won the Soccer Bowl, but ceased operations three days after winning the title, leaving Bekker to look for a new club.

=== North Carolina FC ===
Bekker signed with USL side North Carolina FC on February 6, 2018.

Bekker has appeared on the Raleigh City Sports podcast twice. The first recording went missing which has been called "The Lost Tapes of Raleigh"

=== Forge FC ===
In November 2018, Bekker joined Forge FC of the new Canadian Premier League. Bekker cited the desire of starting for a new club in a new league as motivation for the move. In April 2019, Bekker was named the first captain in team history. On April 27, 2019, he participated in the first ever game in Canadian Premier League history, as Forge hosted York9 FC and battled to a 1–1 draw. In the 2019 Canadian Premier League season, Forge finished as runners up in both the spring and fall seasons, qualifying for the 2019 Canadian Premier League Finals where they faced off against Cavalry FC over two legs. Forge won both games 1–0 to win the North Star Shield and become the first ever Canadian Premier League champions. Bekker played all four of Forge's games in the 2019 CONCACAF League, when they defeated Antigua GFC in the first round, but lost in the round of sixteen to Olimpia. Bekker finished the 2019 season with five assists, tied for first in the league with five other players. He scored four league goals, as well as one in the Canadian Championship.

During the 2020 season, Bekker captained Forge to a second consecutive league title. He recorded three goals and one assist in eleven matches, and was named CPL Player of the Year. Following the season, Bekker re-signed with Forge.

In the 2021 season, Bekker had an individually successful year. Across all competitions he contributed with 5 goals and 2 assists in 35 appearances. He was named to the CPL Team of the Week 6 times, and received his third straight nomination for CPL Player of the Year, though he did not win. For the first time, Forge failed to win the league championship, losing in the final to Pacific, but despite their best performance ever in the CONCACAF League, reaching the semi-finals and qualifying for the 2022 CONCACAF Champions League.

Bekker remained with Forge for the 2022 season. On June 29, he became the first player in league history to play 100 games and was commemorated by the club for his dedication. In March 2023, Bekker was officially re-signed by Forge, penning a multi-year deal. In October of the same year, he helped Forge win their fourth league title, following a 2–1 win over Cavalry FC in the play-off final.

On October 1, 2026, Bekker announced his retirement after being diagnosed with and undergoing successful surgery for testicular cancer earlier in the year, having also suffered an ACL tear a few weeks prior to the announcement. On October 21, Bekker lifted the Voyageurs Cup with Forge after they defeated CF Montréal in the 2026 Canadian Championship final.

== International career ==
Bekker played for Canada at the 2012 CONCACAF Men's Olympic Qualifying Championship. On January 18, 2013, he received his first call up by the Canada senior team for friendlies against Denmark and the United States; he made his senior team debut in the former match against Denmark on January 26, starting in a 4–0 defeat. On June 27, Bekker was included in the confirmed 23-man Canada squad by head coach Colin Miller for the 2013 CONCACAF Gold Cup. He would also represent Canada at the 2015 Gold Cup two years later.

== Career statistics ==
=== Club ===
Appearances and goals by club, season and competition
Club	Season	League			Playoffs (Note: Includes MLS Cup playoffs, NASL playoffs, Canadian Premier League playoffs)		National cup (Note: Includes Canadian Championship, U.S. Open Cup)		Continental		Total	
Club	Season	Division	Apps	Goals	Apps	Goals	Apps	Goals	Apps	Goals	Apps	Goals
Toronto FC	2013	Major League Soccer	9	0	—		2	0	—		11	0
Toronto FC	2014	Major League Soccer	20	0	—		4	0	—		24	0
Toronto FC	Total		29	0	0	0	6	0	0	0	35	0
FC Dallas	2015	Major League Soccer	8	0	—		1	0	—		9	0
FC Montreal	2015	USL	1	0	—		—		—		1	0
Montreal Impact	2015	Major League Soccer	3	1	1	0	0	0	0	0	4	1
Montreal Impact	2016	Major League Soccer	18	1	0	0	2	0	—		20	1
Montreal Impact	Total		21	2	1	0	2	0	0	0	24	2
San Francisco Deltas	2017	NASL	28	3	2	0	3	1	—		33	4
North Carolina FC	2018	USL	33	7	—		3	0	—		36	7
Forge FC	2019	Canadian Premier League	26	4	2	0	2	1	4 (Note: Appearances in CONCACAF League)	0	34	5
Forge FC	2020	Canadian Premier League	10	3	1	0	—		4	0	15	3
Forge FC	2021	Canadian Premier League	26	3	2	0	2	0	7	2	37	5
Forge FC	2022	Canadian Premier League	25	2	2	0	2 (Note: Includes appearance in 2020 Canadian Championship final (played in 2022))	0	2 (Note: Appearances in CONCACAF Champions League/Cup)	0	31	2
Forge FC	2023	Canadian Premier League	26	3	2	1	2	1	—		30	5
Forge FC	2024	Canadian Premier League	25	2	3	0	5	0	2	0	35	2
Forge FC	2025	Canadian Premier League	26	3	2	0	5	1	2	0	35	4
Forge FC	2026	Canadian Premier League	15	1	0	0	5	0	2	0	22	1
Forge FC	Total		179	21	14	1	23	3	23	2	239	27
Career total			299	33	17	1	38	4	23	2	377	40

=== International ===
Appearances and goals by national team and year
National team	Year	Apps	Goals
Canada	2013	11	0
Canada	2014	2	0
Canada	2015	3	0
Canada	2016	1	0
Canada	2017	1	0
Total		18	0

== Honours ==
San Francisco Deltas

- Soccer Bowl: 2017

Forge FC

- Canadian Premier League: 2019, 2020, 2022, 2023
- CPL Shield: 2021, 2024, 2025
- Canadian Championship: 2026

Individual

- Canadian Premier League Player of the Year: 2020
