= Lucas Ontivero =

Argentine footballer

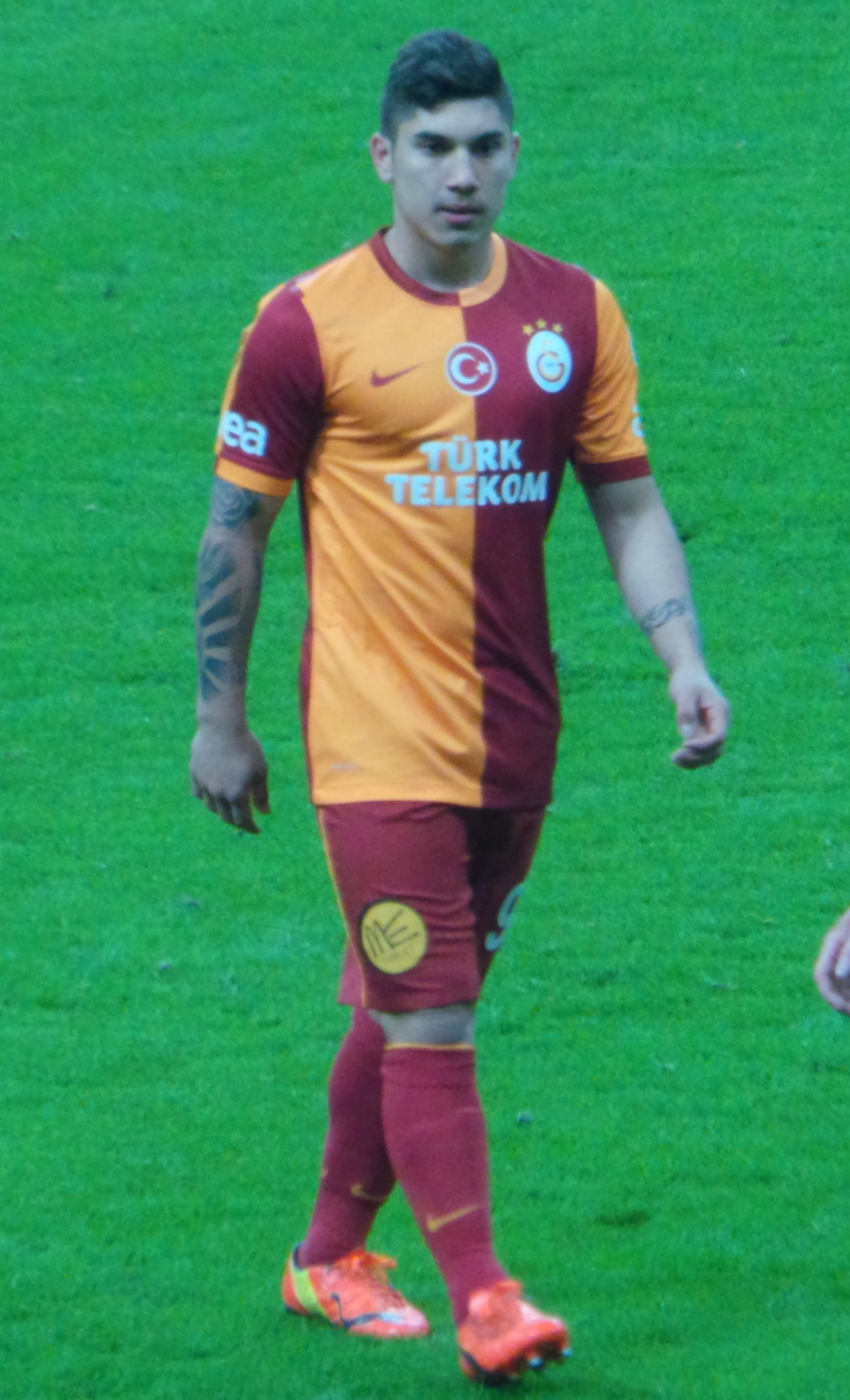

Personal information
- Full name: Lucas Elías Ontivero
- Date of birth: 9 September 1994 (age 32)
- Place of birth: Catamarca, Argentina
- Height: 1.68 m (5 ft 6 in)
- Position: Winger

Team information
- Current team: Gualaceo
- Number: 10

Youth career
- San Lorenzo de Alem
- Venados
- 2011–2012: Independiente

Senior career*
Years	Team	Apps	(Gls)
2013	Fénix	10	(1)
2014–2016	Galatasaray	8	(0)
2014	→ Gaziantepspor (loan)	3	(0)
2015	→ Budapest Honvéd (loan)	1	(0)
2015	→ Olimpija Ljubljana (loan)	13	(4)
2016	→ Montreal Impact (loan)	23	(2)
2017	Universidad de Chile	7	(0)
2017	Venados	16	(2)
2018	Chacarita Juniors	3	(0)
2018–2019	Johor Darul Ta'zim II	10	(2)
2019	Orlando City B	5	(1)
2020	Juventude	3	(0)
2020–2021	Rentistas	6	(0)
2022	San Lorenzo de Alem		
2022–2023	Trinidense	3	(0)
2024	Cumbayá	20	(3)
2025–2026	Atlético Rafaela	13	(1)
2026–	Gualaceo	7	(0)
- * Club domestic league appearances and goals as of 10 June 2026

Lucas Ontivero (born 9 September 1994) is an Argentine professional footballer who plays as a winger for Primera Categoría Serie B club Gualaceo.

== Club career ==
=== Youth career ===
Ontivero began playing football with local team San Lorenzo de Alem in his hometown of Catamarca before moving to Venados in Mexico and back to Argentina with Independiente. In December 2011, Ontivero was promoted to the Independiente senior team by Ramón Díaz.

During his youth career, Ontivero spent time with the academies of Real Madrid, Tottenham Hotspur, A.C. Milan and Genoa although FIFA rules prevented him from signing in Europe at that age.

=== Fénix ===
Following a disagreement with Christian Díaz who had replaced Ramón Díaz as Independiente manager in March 2012, Ontivero opted for a move to Centro Atlético Fénix of Uruguay's Primera División.

=== Galatasaray ===
On 31 January 2014, Ontivero was bought by Turkish club Galatasaray for €2 million. He was sent out on loan in his first full season at the club to fellow Süper Lig team Gaziantepspor and then Budapest Honvéd in Hungarian first division.

The following season Ontivero had a loan spell with Olimpija Ljubljana in Slovenia.

In January 2016, Ontivero was loaned out again, this time joining MLS team Montreal Impact as a Designated Player. The deal expired at the end of the 2016 season.

On 6 January 2017, Ontivero and Galatasaray mutually agreed to terminate his contract.

=== Universidad de Chile ===
After leaving Turkey, Ontivero continued to find it difficult to settle at one team. On 25 January 2017, joined Chilean Primera División team Universidad de Chile. He made his debut on 5 February 2017, coming on as a substitute against Deportes Iquique. However, concerns with both his fitness and attitude, as well as a lack of foreign player roster spots (the Chilean league permits five per team), meant his contract was terminated.

=== Venados ===
On 1 July 2017, Ontivero rejoined Venados in Mexico's Ascenso MX where he'd previously been in the academy.

=== Chacarita Juniors ===
On 25 January 2018, Ontivero signed a six-month contract with Chacarita, his first professional contract in his native Argentina. He made three appearances before his contract was cancelled in April 2018.

=== Johor Darul Ta'zim ===
In May 2018, Ontivero signed with Johor Darul Ta'zim II, the reserve team of JDT. They sat bottom of the Malaysian second division upon his arrival but finished the 2018 season in fourth place. The following year, JDT II finished second in the league which would have seen the team promoted if not for their parent club already playing in the Super League.

=== Orlando City ===
On 24 August 2019, Ontivero returned to North America, signing with USL League One team Orlando City B, the reserve team of Orlando City. He made his debut on the same day in a 3–1 defeat away to FC Tucson.

=== Juventude ===
On 2 March 2020, Ontivero signed with Juventude of Brazil's Série B.

=== Rentistas ===
Ontivero joined Uruguayan Primera División side Rentistas in October 2020, where he played until leaving the club in April 2021.

== Honours ==
Galatasaray

- Türkiye Kupası: 2013–14

Universidad de Chile

- Chilean Primera División: Torneo Clausura 2017
