= Dominic Oduro =

Ghanaian footballer (born 1985)

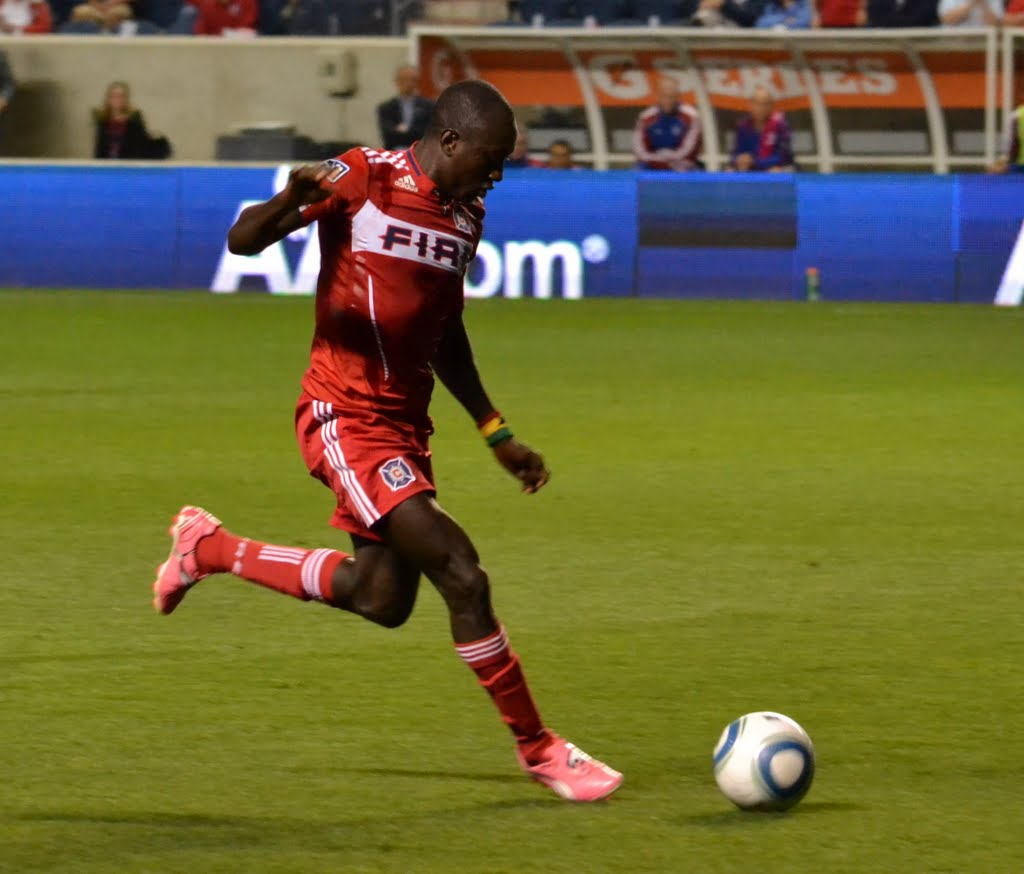
- Oduro playing for Chicago Fire 2011

Personal information
- Date of birth: 13 August 1985 (age 41)
- Place of birth: Pramso, Ghana
- Height: 6 ft 0 in (1.83 m)
- Position: Forward

Youth career
- 1999–2000: Prempeh College
- 2001–2003: University of Ghana
- 2004–2005: VCU Rams

Senior career*
Years	Team	Apps	(Gls)
2005	Richmond Kickers Future	13	(16)
2006–2008	FC Dallas	70	(9)
2009	New York Red Bulls	3	(0)
2009–2011	Houston Dynamo	44	(6)
2011–2012	Chicago Fire	66	(18)
2013–2014	Columbus Crew	45	(13)
2014	Toronto FC	24	(2)
2015–2018	Montreal Impact	89	(15)
2018	San Jose Earthquakes	5	(0)
2019	Charlotte Independence	33	(8)

International career^{‡}
2012	Ghana	1	(0)

Managerial career
- 2023–: Charlotte FC Academy
- * Club domestic league appearances and goals as of 21 October 2019 ‡ National team caps and goals as of 14 September 2013

Dominic Oduro (born 13 August 1985) is a Ghanaian professional footballer who plays as a forward. Oduro is currently an assistant coach for San Antonio's FC (USL Championship). Oduro was formerly the assistant coach of the Charlotte FC Academy side competing in the United Premier Soccer League.

== Early career and education ==
Oduro started his playing career in Ghana, playing for both Prempeh College and the University of Ghana before transferring to Virginia Commonwealth University in 2004. He appeared in 41 matches for VCU, scoring 18 goals and earning five assists, and being honoured with the 2004 Colonial Athletic Association Player of the Year award and a Third Team All-American spot. Oduro helped the Rams reach the quarterfinals of the 2004 NCAA Tournament, VCU's highest ever appearance. He also played for Richmond Kickers Future in the USL Premier Development League in 2005, scoring 16 goals in 13 games.

== Club career ==
=== FC Dallas ===
Oduro was selected in the second round (22nd overall) of the 2006 MLS SuperDraft by FC Dallas. He made his first team debut on 28 June 2006, as a substitute for Kenny Cooper and scored his first MLS goal on 8 July 2006 against New York Red Bulls. During his three-year stay in Dallas, Oduro impressed fans and coaches with his blazing speed and effort. He was primarily used as a second-half substitute, to provide a spark to the clubs attack, and ultimately appeared in 70 league matches for FC Dallas, with his most productive season coming in 2008 in which he netted 5 goals in 25 matches.

=== New York Red Bulls ===
He was traded to New York Red Bulls on 12 January 2009, while Dave van den Bergh went in the other direction to FC Dallas. In the deal, New York also acquired the #11 and #18 picks in the 2009 MLS SuperDraft while Dallas acquired the No. 14 pick.

=== Houston Dynamo ===
Less than five months later, New York traded Oduro to Houston Dynamo on 27 May 2009 for a first-round pick in the 2010 MLS SuperDraft and a second-round pick in the 2011 MLS SuperDraft. Oduro made his first start for the Houston Dynamo on 1 July 2009 against the USL-1 side Austin Aztex. The game was the third round of the Lamar Hunt US Open Cup. Houston won the match, played at Nelson Field in Austin, Texas, 2–0.

Oduro stayed with Houston through the 2009 and 2010 MLS seasons. After the 2010 season, he decided to make a move overseas but was unsuccessful in securing a contract and re-signed with Houston on 2 March 2011.

=== Chicago Fire ===
After missing a sitter in the opening game of the 2011 season, Oduro was traded to Chicago Fire in exchange for Calen Carr on 23 March 2011. Oduro performed well with Chicago, scoring 12 goals during his first season with the team. For his outstanding play in 2011 he was awarded the Supporters Player of the Year award by Section 8 Chicago, the supporters section of the Chicago Fire.

=== Columbus Crew ===
Oduro was traded to Columbus Crew on 1 February 2013 in exchange for Dilly Duka. He featured for the club for two seasons from 2013 to 2014, playing 43 matches and scoring 13 goals in all competitions.

=== Toronto FC ===
Oduro was traded to Toronto FC on 6 June 2014 for winger Alvaro Rey.

=== Montreal Impact ===
He was traded to Montreal Impact on 27 January 2015 for allocation money. He played from 2015 to 2018, playing 108 matches and scoring 18 goals in all competitions.

=== San Jose Earthquakes ===
Oduro was traded to San Jose Earthquakes on 8 August 2018 for Quincy Amarikwa.

=== Charlotte Independence ===
On 15 February 2019, Oduro signed with Charlotte Independence of the USL Championship. He was released by Charlotte at the end of the 2019 season.

== International career ==
On 26 February 2012, Oduro was called up to the Ghana squad to face Chile. Oduro made his Ghana debut against Chile on 29 February 2012 at PPL Park in Chester, Pennsylvania.

== Coaching ==
Oduro began coaching the Charlotte FC U14 team in 2022. In 2023, he was named coach of Charlotte FC's semi-pro United Premier Soccer League side. In 2025, Oduro joined San Antonio's FC in the USL Championship as an assistant coach. In 2025, Oduro also was an assistant coach for Trinity University's men's soccer squad.

== Personal life ==
Oduro holds a U.S. green card which qualifies him as a domestic player for MLS roster purposes.

== Career statistics ==
As of 27 August 2020

Appearances and goals by club, season and competition
Club	Season	League			Playoffs		Cup (Note: Appearances in US Open Cup and Canadian Championship)		Continental (Note: Appearances for 2010 in North American SuperLiga, others in CONCACAF Champions League)		Total	
Club	Season	Division	Apps	Goals	Apps	Goals	Apps	Goals	Apps	Goals	Apps	Goals
Richmond Kickers Future	2005	PDL	13	16	0	0	2	2	—		15	18
FC Dallas	2006	MLS	16	1	0	0	1	0	—		17	1
FC Dallas	2007	MLS	29	3	2	0	2	0	—		33	3
FC Dallas	2008	MLS	25	5	—		2	0	—		27	5
FC Dallas	Total		70	9	2	0	5	0	0	0	77	9
New York Red Bulls	2009	MLS	3	0	—		2	0	—		5	0
Houston Dynamo	2009	MLS	16	1	3	0	3	2	5	0	27	3
Houston Dynamo	2010	MLS	27	5	—		2	1	3	1	32	7
Houston Dynamo	2011	MLS	1	0	0	0	0	0	—		1	0
Houston Dynamo	Total		44	6	3	0	5	3	8	1	60	10
Chicago Fire	2011	MLS	33	12	—		4	2	—		37	14
Chicago Fire	2012	MLS	33	6	1	0	1	0	—		35	6
Chicago Fire	Total		66	18	1	0	5	2	0	0	72	20
Columbus Crew	2013	MLS	34	13	—		1	0	—		35	13
Columbus Crew	2014	MLS	11	0	0	0	0	0	—		11	0
Columbus Crew	Total		45	12	0	0	1	0	0	0	46	13
Toronto FC	2014	MLS	24	2	—		0	0	—		24	2
Montreal Impact	2015	MLS	28	8	2	0	4	1	6	0	40	9
Montreal Impact	2016	MLS	31	6	5	2	2	0	—		38	8
Montreal Impact	2017	MLS	25	1	—		3	0	—		28	1
Montreal Impact	2018	MLS	5	0	—		0	0	—		5	0
Montreal Impact	Total		89	15	7	2	9	1	6	0	109	18
San Jose Earthquakes	2018	MLS	5	0	—		0	0	—		5	0
Charlotte Independence	2019	USL Championship	33	8	0	0	1	1	—		34	9
Career total			392	87	13	2	30	9	14	1	449	99
