= Donny Toia =

American soccer player

Personal information
- Full name: Donald Austin Toia
- Date of birth: May 28, 1992 (age 34)
- Place of birth: Tucson, Arizona, United States
- Height: 1.73 m (5 ft 8 in)
- Position: Defender

Youth career
- 2000–2009: Tucson Soccer Academy
- 2009–2011: Real Salt Lake AZ

Senior career*
Years	Team	Apps	(Gls)
2011	Real Salt Lake	0	(0)
2012	FC Tucson	14	(4)
2013	Phoenix FC	22	(6)
2014	Chivas USA	27	(0)
2015–2016	Montreal Impact	48	(1)
2017–2018	Orlando City	34	(0)
2019–2021	Real Salt Lake	63	(1)
2019	→ Real Monarchs (loan)	1	(0)
2022	FC Tucson	18	(5)
2025	Des Moines Menace	0	(0)
Total		227	(17)

International career
2008	United States U18	3	(0)
2011	United States U20	1	(0)
- * Club domestic league appearances and goals

Donald Austin "Donny" Toia (born May 28, 1992) is an American former professional soccer player.

== Career ==
=== Real Salt Lake ===
Toia got his start with the Tucson Soccer Academy as a forward, and at the end of his youth career with then, signed with Real Salt Lake as the club's first homegrown player in March 2011 after spending two years in their youth system. However, in February 2012, Toia was released by the club without ever making a first team appearance.

=== FC Tucson ===
Following his release from Real Salt Lake, Toia joined FC Tucson in the USL Premier Development League where he made 15 appearances for the club during the 2012 season. Toia scored the first goal in FC Tucson history on May 5, 2012, during a 2–1 loss to Fresno Fuego FC.

=== Phoenix FC ===
In February 2013, Toia signed with USL Pro club Phoenix FC for the inaugural season. He made his professional debut on March 23 in the club's inaugural match, a 2–0 loss to Los Angeles Blues. Toia finished the season with 6 goals to lead the team and was a nominee for USL Pro Rookie of the Year. He was voted player of the season by La Furia Roja 1881, the club's supporters group.

=== Return to MLS ===
Toia signed with Major League Soccer club Chivas USA in January 2014. After Chivas folded in November 2014, Toia was selected in the 2014 MLS Dispersal Draft by the Montreal Impact. He earned even more playing time in Canada, taking over as the Impact's starting left back. He was selected 1st overall in the 2016 MLS Expansion Draft by Atlanta United FC, after which he was promptly traded to Orlando City for the eighth overall pick in the 2017 MLS SuperDraft. He was released by Orlando at the end of the 2018 season.

On December 14, 2018, Toia re-joined Real Salt Lake after being selected in the 2018 MLS Re-Entry Draft. Following the 2021 season, Toia's contract option was declined by Salt Lake.

=== Return to FC Tucson ===
Toia returned to FC Tucson, now in USL League One, on June 16, 2022.

=== Des Moines Menace ===
In 2025, Toia signed for Des Moines Menace in USL League Two. He would retire in July 2025 after the season.

== International career ==
Toia has represented the United States at U18 and U20 youth levels.

== Career statistics ==
=== Club ===
As of October 28, 2018

Club	Season	League			Cup		Continental		League Playoffs		Total	
Club	Season	Division	Apps	Goals	Apps	Goals	Apps	Goals	Apps	Goals	Apps	Goals
Real Salt Lake	2011	MLS	0	0	0	0	-		0	0	0	0
FC Tucson	2012	PDL	14	4	0	0	-		1	1	15	5
Phoenix FC	2013	USL	22	6	1	0	-		-		23	6
Chivas USA	2014	MLS	27	0	1	0	-		-		28	0
Montreal Impact	2015	MLS	31	1	2	0	6	0	3	0	42	1
Montreal Impact	2016	MLS	17	0	0	0	-		1	0	18	0
Orlando City	2017	MLS	30	0	0	0	-		-		30	0
Orlando City	2018	MLS	4	0	1	0	-		-		5	0
Real Salt Lake	2019	MLS	1	0	0	0	-		-		1	0
Career totals			146	11	5	0	6	0	5	1	162	12

== Honors ==
- Canadian Championship: (1) – 2014
