= Cameron Porter =

American soccer player (born 1993)

Personal information
- Full name: Cameron Bernard Porter
- Date of birth: May 23, 1993 (age 33)
- Place of birth: Centerville, Ohio, United States
- Height: 6 ft 1 in (1.85 m)
- Position: Forward

Youth career
- Cincinnati United Premier Gold

College career
Years	Team	Apps	(Gls)
2011–2014	Princeton Tigers	67	(31)

Senior career*
Years	Team	Apps	(Gls)
2015–2016	Montreal Impact	2	(0)
2016	→ FC Montreal (loan)	4	(0)
2016–2017	Sporting Kansas City	3	(0)
2016	→ Swope Park Rangers (loan)	1	(0)
- * Club domestic league appearances and goals as of October 24, 2017

Cameron Bernard Porter (born May 23, 1993) is an American former professional soccer player.

== Career ==
=== College ===
Porter spent four years playing college soccer at Princeton University between 2011 and 2014. During his time at Princeton, Porter was named 2013 First-Team All-Ivy League, 2013 Academic All-Ivy and 2014 ECAC Offensive Player of the Year. While at Princeton, Porter majored in Computer Science and was a member of the Ivy Club.

=== Professional ===
On January 15, 2015, Porter was drafted in the third round (45th overall) of the 2015 MLS SuperDraft by Montreal Impact. He signed a contract with the club on February 7, 2015. Porter made his professional debut on February 24, 2015, as an 81st-minute substitute during a 2–2 draw against Pachuca in the CONCACAF Champions League. He scored his first professional goal on March 3, 2015, in stoppage time (90+4) from a long Calum Mallace pass, at home (in the Olympic Stadium) in the second leg against Pachuca; with this strike, he tied the game and made the Impact win the series on away goals, giving the team its first CONCACAF Champions League semi-final berth. Later that night on post match press conference Porter described his goal as "a dream come true".

On March 21, 2015, in a game against the New England Revolution, Porter suffered an injury in the first half and was taken out of the game. He underwent surgery on his left knee to repair an ACL tear. He missed the entire 2015 season.

Porter was traded to Sporting Kansas City on July 12, 2016, in exchange for Amadou Dia. While playing with Kansas City, he also worked as a remote software engineer for MLS Digital, the league's digital content department, between matches and training.

On January 29, 2018, he announced his retirement from professional soccer at the age of 24.
