= Calum Mallace =

Scottish footballer (born 1990)

Personal information
- Date of birth: 10 January 1990 (age 36)
- Place of birth: Torphichen, Scotland
- Position: Midfielder

College career
Years	Team	Apps	(Gls)
2008–2011	Marquette Golden Eagles	69	(13)

Senior career*
Years	Team	Apps	(Gls)
2009–2011	Chicago Fire Premier	20	(1)
2012–2017	Montreal Impact	80	(1)
2013	→ Minnesota United (loan)	12	(1)
2017	Seattle Sounders FC	0	(0)
2017	→ Seattle Sounders FC 2 (loan)	3	(0)
2018	Los Angeles FC	5	(0)
2019	Austin Bold	19	(0)

Managerial career
- 2020: Northwestern Wildcats (asst.)
- 2021–: Loyola Ramblers (asst.)
- 2023–: Bavarian United SC
- * Club domestic league appearances and goals as of 25 October 2019

Calum Mallace (born 10 January 1990) is a Scottish former footballer who played as a midfielder. He retired from professional football at the conclusion of the 2019 USL Championship season. He is currently the head coach of Bavarian United SC in USL League Two and an assistant coach for the Loyola Ramblers.

== Club career ==
=== College and amateur ===
Mallace attended Henry Sibley High School in Mendota Heights, Minnesota. He then went on to spend four years at Marquette University, where he won awards such as the 2011 Big East Conference Midfielder of the Year, 2011 Second Team All-America, and was 2011 Marquette University Most Valuable Player.

Mallace also played in the USL Premier Development League for Chicago Fire Premier between 2009 and 2011.

=== Professional ===
On 12 January 2012, Mallace was selected #20 overall in the 2012 MLS SuperDraft by the Montreal Impact.

On 8 August 2017 he was traded to Seattle Sounders FC for a fourth-round pick in the 2017 MLS SuperDraft.

At the end of the 2017 season Mallace entered the 2017 MLS Re-Entry Draft after Seattle declined his contract option. On 21 December 2017, he was selected by Los Angeles FC in Stage Two of the draft.

Following his release from Los Angeles, Mallace joined USL Championship side Austin Bold ahead of their inaugural season. He retired at the end of the 2019 season.

== Career statistics ==
Appearances and goals by club, season and competition
Club	Season	League			Playoffs		Cup		Continental		Total	
Club	Season	Division	Apps	Goals	Apps	Goals	Apps	Goals	Apps	Goals	Apps	Goals
Montreal Impact	2012	Major League Soccer	4	0	—		0	0	—		4	0
Montreal Impact	2013	Major League Soccer	2	0	0	0	1	0	—		3	0
Montreal Impact	2014	Major League Soccer	23	1	—		3	0	3	0	29	1
Montreal Impact	2015	Major League Soccer	26	0	3	0	3	0	6	0	38	0
Montreal Impact	2016	Major League Soccer	18	0	3	0	0	0	—		21	0
Montreal Impact	2017	Major League Soccer	7	0	—		1	0	—		8	0
Montreal Impact	Totals		80	1	6	0	8	0	9	0	103	1
Minnesota United	2013	NASL	12	1	—		0	0	—		12	1
Seattle Sounders 2	2017	USL	3	0	—		0	0	—		3	0
Los Angeles FC	2018	Major League Soccer	5	0	—		2	0	—		7	0
Austin Bold	2019	USL Championship	19	0	—		2	0	—		21	0
Career total			119	2	6	0	12	0	9	0	146	2

== Personal life ==
Mallace has had U.S. citizenship since 2011. Born in Torphichen, Scotland, Mallace lived in Scotland until he moved to America when he was nine. Despite living in America throughout his life, Mallace had not ruled out play for the Scotland national team.

== Honours ==
=== Montreal Impact ===
- Canadian Championship (2): 2013, 2014
