= Laurent Ciman =

Belgian footballer

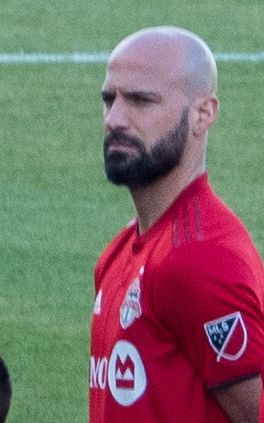
- Ciman with Toronto FC in 2020

Personal information
- Full name: Laurent Franco Ciman
- Date of birth: 5 August 1985 (age 41)
- Place of birth: Farciennes, Belgium
- Height: 1.84 m (6 ft 0 in)
- Position: Defender

Team information
- Current team: FC Supra du Québec (assistant)

Senior career*
Years	Team	Apps	(Gls)
2004–2008	Charleroi	85	(3)
2008–2010	Club Brugge	16	(0)
2009–2010	→ Kortrijk (loan)	34	(2)
2010–2015	Standard Liège	152	(6)
2015–2017	Montreal Impact	85	(2)
2018	Los Angeles FC	22	(3)
2018	Dijon	9	(0)
2019–2020	Toronto FC	29	(0)
Total		432	(16)

International career
2004–2008	Belgium U21	5	(0)
2008	Belgium Olympic	1	(0)
2010–2018	Belgium	20	(1)

Managerial career
- 2021–2024: CF Montréal (assistant)
- 2026–: FC Supra du Québec (assistant)
- * Club domestic league appearances and goals

Laurent Franco Ciman (born 5 August 1985) is a Belgian former professional footballer who played as a defender, who currently serves as an assistant coach with Canadian Premier League club FC Supra du Québec.

== Club career ==
=== Charleroi ===
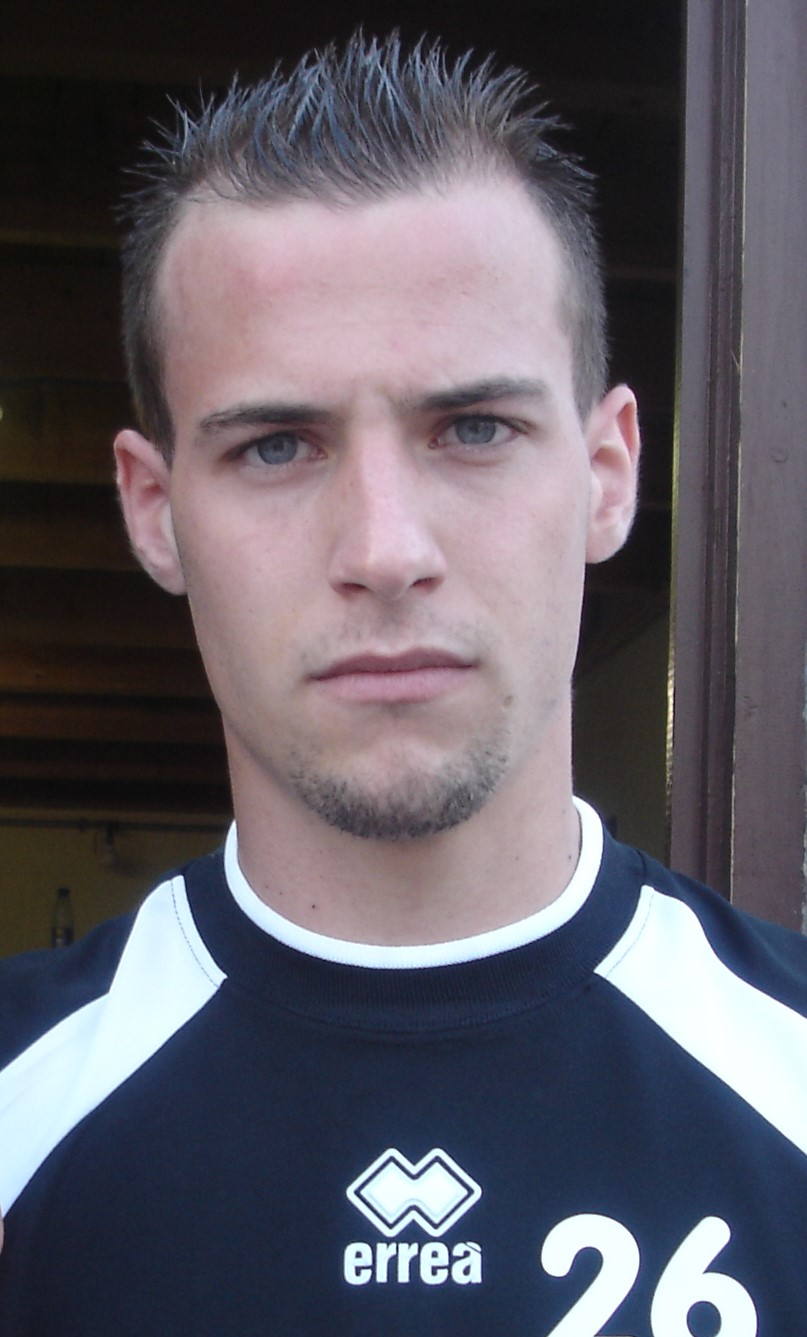
Ciman with Charleroi

Ciman began his career in the youth system of Charleroi and made his first team debut in 2004. His play with Charleroi attracted the interest of the top Belgian clubs.

=== Club Brugge ===
Ciman was transferred from Charleroi to Club Brugge in June 2008 and signed a three-year contract for the Belgian team, he was loaned to Kortrijk for the 2009–10 season.

=== Standard Liège ===
On 16 June 2010, he joined Standard Liège on a four-year contract. Upon joining Standard, Ciman established him as a starter and helped the club capture the 2010–11 Belgian Cup. He made 194 appearances for the club, scoring eight goals, before leaving the club in the winter of 2015.

=== Montreal Impact ===
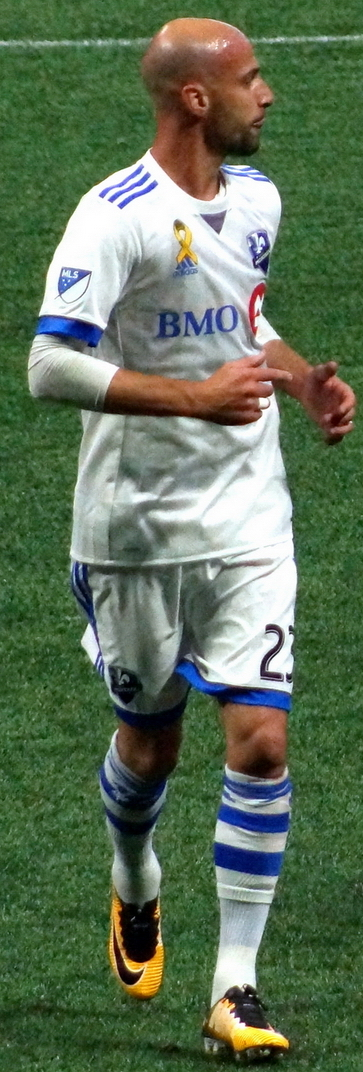
Ciman playing for Montreal Impact in 2017

Ciman signed a three-year deal with Major League Soccer club Montreal Impact on 22 January 2015. In his first season with the team, he was named MLS Defender of the Year. In July 2016, he was included in the roster for the 2016 MLS All-Star Game.

=== LAFC ===
On 12 December 2017, Ciman was traded to MLS expansion side Los Angeles FC in exchange for Raheem Edwards and Jukka Raitala. On 29 April 2018 Ciman scored the first goal in LAFCs newly opened Banc of California Stadium on a free kick in the 93rd minute.

=== Dijon ===
On 28 August 2018, Ciman joined Ligue 1 club Dijon FCO on a two-year contract. The transfer fee paid to LAFC was reported as $500,000. Just 4 months later, Ciman had his contract at Dijon terminated by mutual consent.

=== Toronto FC ===
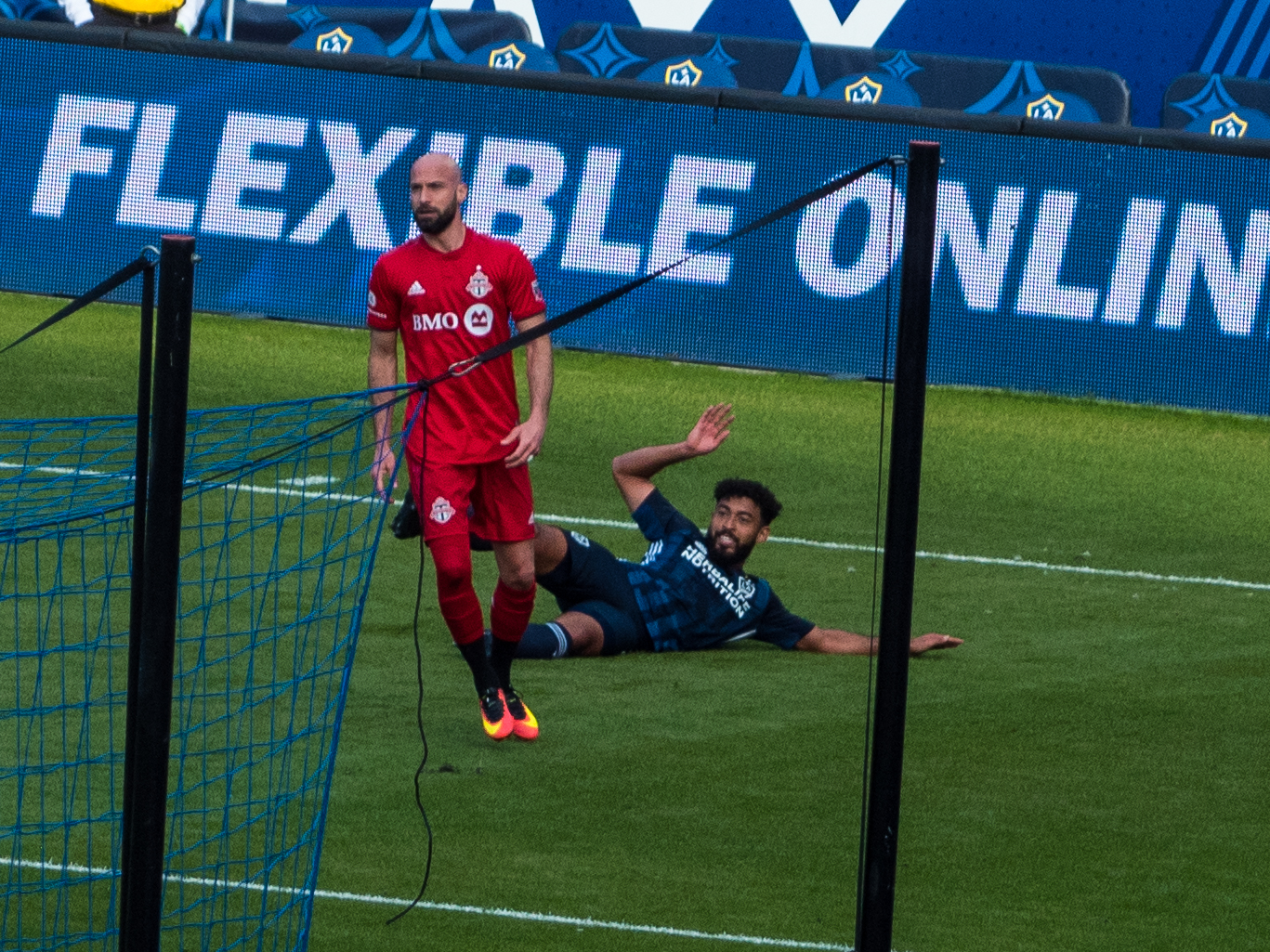
Ciman playing for Toronto FC against LA Galaxy

On 27 December 2018, he returned to MLS, signing with Toronto FC. Following the 2020 season, Toronto chose not to renew his contract.

== International career ==
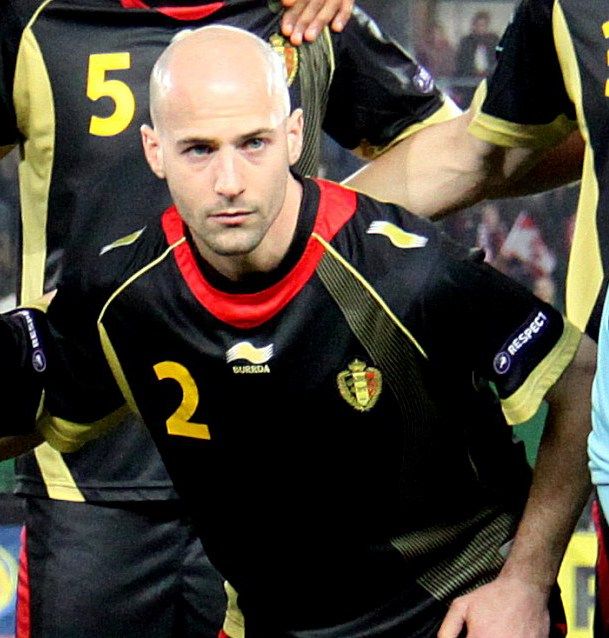
Ciman with the Belgium national team

Ciman was a member of the Belgium squad which came fourth at the 2008 Olympics.

Ciman also played for the National U21 side and was called up by national coach Georges Leekens for the friendly match against Bulgaria on 19 May 2010, during which he made his debut.

On 13 May 2014, Ciman was named in Belgium's squad for the 2014 World Cup. He was unused in the tournament, in which Belgium reached the quarter-finals. In the next major tournament, UEFA Euro 2016 he was also part of the squad. This time, he played in the opening game of the competition, a 2–0 defeat to Italy.

In May 2018, he was named as an alternate for Belgium's squad for the 2018 World Cup in Russia.

== Coaching career ==
On 24 February 2021 CF Montréal announced Ciman as a new assistant coach for the club. Ciman and Montréal parted ways in December 2024.

In March 2026, he joined Canadian Premier League club FC Supra du Québec as an assistant coach.

== Personal life ==
Ciman is married to Diana and has two children, a daughter named Nina and a son named Achille. His daughter has autism, and he moved to Montreal in 2015, as the city had better supports for his daughter than his native Belgium. He continued to live in the city even while playing for Toronto. In 2020, Ciman obtained Canadian Permanent Residency status, allowing him to be counted as a domestic player for MLS purposes.

== Career statistics ==
=== International ===
Belgium
Year	Apps	Goals
2010	2	0
2011	6	0
2014	1	0
2016	7	1
2017	3	0
2018	1	0
Total	20	1

Belgium score listed first, score column indicates score after each Ciman goal.

International goals by date, venue, cap, opponent, score, result and competition
No.	Date	Venue	Cap	Opponent	Score	Result	Competition
1	5 June 2016	King Baudouin Stadium, Brussels, Belgium	11	Norway	3–2	3–2	Friendly

== Honors ==
Club Brugge

- Bruges Matins: 2009

Standard Liège

- Belgian Cup: 2010–11

Montreal Impact

- CONCACAF Champions League: runner-up 2014–15

Toronto FC

- MLS Eastern Conference: 2019
- MLS Cup: runner-up 2019

Individual

- MLS All-Star: 2015, 2016, 2018
- MLS Defender of the Year: 2015
- MLS Best XI: 2015
