= 2013 Montreal Impact season =

Montreal Impact
2013 season
- Owner & President: Joey Saputo
- Coach: Marco Schällibaum
- Major League Soccer: 11th
- WDW Pro Soccer Classic: Champion
- Canadian Championship: Champion
- MLS Cup: Knockout Round
- CONCACAF Champions League: Group stage
- Top goalscorer: League: Marco Di Vaio (20); All: Marco Di Vaio (22)
- Highest home attendance: 37,896 v Toronto FC (March 16, 2013, Major League Soccer)
- Lowest home attendance: 12,016 v Vancouver Whitecaps FC (May 15, 2013, Canadian Championship)
- Average home league attendance: 20,603
| Home colours | Away colours | Third colours |

The 2013 Montreal Impact season was the club's second season Major League Soccer, the top flight of both American and Canadian soccer.

For the 2013 season, outside of MLS, the Impact will compete in the 2013 Canadian Championship, Canada's domestic cup competition, which determines the Canadian entrant in the CONCACAF Champions League.

== Review ==
The team started the season with Marco Schällibaum as new coach. After finishing 12th overall in the previous MLS season and second best Canadian team in MLS in 2012, the Montreal Impact officially started their 2013 season on Monday January 21, 2013 with a pre-season training sessions at Marie-Victorin Sports Complex in Montréal-Nord. The squad's first official pre-season friendly took place on February 9, 2013, at the annual Walt Disney World Pro Soccer Classic tournament with a 2–1 victory over Sporting Kansas City. The team kicked off the season on March 2, 2013, with a 0–1 away victory over Seattle Sounders FC.

They started the season very well with four straight victories, including their first two on the road, equaling their road wins total of last year of two.

== Competitions ==
=== Pre-season matches ===
==== Walt Disney World Pro Soccer Classic ====
Win Draw Loss

| February 9, 2013 Match 1 | Sporting Kansas City | 1–2 | Montreal Impact | Hess Stadium |
| | Zusi 18' | Report | Arnaud (yellow card) 30'; Di Vaio 45'; Wenger 61'; Lefevre (yellow card) 90' |

| February 13, 2013 Match 2 | Tampa Bay Rowdies | 1–4 | Montreal Impact | Hess Stadium |
| | Campbell (yellow card) 32'; Yamada 38' (pen.) | Report | Felipe 2'; Di Vaio 17' (pen.), 42'; Nyassi 66' |

| February 16, 2013 Match 3 | D.C. United | 1–1 | Montreal Impact | Hess Stadium |
| | McDonald (yellow card) 40'; Riley (yellow card) 51'; Porter 85' | Report | Pisanu 16'; Arnaud (yellow card) 40'; Di Vaio (yellow card) 44' |

| February 23, 2013 Final | Columbus Crew | 0–1 | Montreal Impact | Hess Stadium |
| | Viana (yellow card) 26'; Gláuber (yellow card) 73' | Report | Pisanu (yellow card) 16'; Mapp 54'; Ferrari (yellow card) 90' |

==== Other pre-season matches ====
| February 15, 2013 Friendly | Philadelphia Union | 0–0 | Montreal Impact | EverBank Field |
| | McInerney (yellow card) 66' | Report |

| February 20, 2013 Friendly | Orlando City | 2–1 | Montreal Impact | Seminole Soccer Complex |
| | Chin 3'; Fuller 41' | Report | Warner (red card) 42'; Mallace 72' |

=== MLS regular season ===
==== Table ====
Eastern Conference Table

| Pos | Team | Pld | W | L | T | GF | GA | GD | Pts | Qualification |
|---|---|---|---|---|---|---|---|---|---|---|
| 1 | New York Red Bulls | 34 | 17 | 9 | 8 | 58 | 41 | +17 | 59 | Qualification for the conference semifinals |
| 2 | Sporting Kansas City | 34 | 17 | 10 | 7 | 47 | 30 | +17 | 58 | Qualification for the conference semifinals |
| 3 | New England Revolution | 34 | 14 | 11 | 9 | 49 | 38 | +11 | 51 | Qualification for the conference semifinals |
| 4 | Houston Dynamo | 34 | 14 | 11 | 9 | 41 | 41 | 0 | 51 | Qualification for the knockout round |
| 5 | Montreal Impact | 34 | 14 | 13 | 7 | 50 | 49 | +1 | 49 | Qualification for the knockout round |
| 6 | Chicago Fire | 34 | 14 | 13 | 7 | 47 | 52 | −5 | 49 | |
| 7 | Philadelphia Union | 34 | 12 | 12 | 10 | 42 | 44 | −2 | 46 | |
| 8 | Columbus Crew | 34 | 12 | 17 | 5 | 42 | 46 | −4 | 41 | |
| 9 | Toronto FC | 34 | 6 | 17 | 11 | 30 | 47 | −17 | 29 | |
| 10 | D.C. United | 34 | 3 | 24 | 7 | 22 | 59 | −37 | 16 | |

Source: MLS

Overall Table

| Pos | Team | Pld | W | L | T | GF | GA | GD | Pts | |
|---|---|---|---|---|---|---|---|---|---|---|
| 1 | New York Red Bulls (S) | 34 | 17 | 9 | 8 | 58 | 41 | +17 | 59 | Qualification for the CONCACAF Champions League |
| 2 | Sporting Kansas City (C) | 34 | 17 | 10 | 7 | 47 | 30 | +17 | 58 | Qualification for the CONCACAF Champions League |
| 3 | Portland Timbers | 34 | 14 | 5 | 15 | 54 | 33 | +21 | 57 | Qualification for the CONCACAF Champions League |
| 4 | Real Salt Lake | 34 | 16 | 10 | 8 | 57 | 41 | +16 | 56 | |
| 5 | LA Galaxy | 34 | 15 | 11 | 8 | 53 | 38 | +15 | 53 | |
| 6 | Seattle Sounders FC | 34 | 15 | 12 | 7 | 42 | 42 | 0 | 52 | |
| 7 | New England Revolution | 34 | 14 | 11 | 9 | 49 | 38 | +11 | 51 | |
| 8 | Colorado Rapids | 34 | 14 | 11 | 9 | 45 | 38 | +7 | 51 | |
| 9 | Houston Dynamo | 34 | 14 | 11 | 9 | 41 | 41 | 0 | 51 | |
| 10 | San Jose Earthquakes | 34 | 14 | 11 | 9 | 35 | 42 | −7 | 51 | |
| 11 | Montreal Impact (V) | 34 | 14 | 13 | 7 | 50 | 49 | +1 | 49 | Qualification for the CONCACAF Champions League |
| 12 | Chicago Fire | 34 | 14 | 13 | 7 | 47 | 52 | −5 | 49 | |
| 13 | Vancouver Whitecaps FC | 34 | 13 | 12 | 9 | 53 | 45 | +8 | 48 | |
| 14 | Philadelphia Union | 34 | 12 | 12 | 10 | 42 | 44 | −2 | 46 | |
| 15 | FC Dallas | 34 | 11 | 12 | 11 | 48 | 52 | −4 | 44 | |
| 16 | Columbus Crew | 34 | 12 | 17 | 5 | 42 | 46 | −4 | 41 | |
| 17 | Toronto FC | 34 | 6 | 17 | 11 | 30 | 47 | −17 | 29 | |
| 18 | Chivas USA | 34 | 6 | 20 | 8 | 30 | 67 | −37 | 26 | |
| 19 | D.C. United (U) | 34 | 3 | 24 | 7 | 22 | 59 | −37 | 16 | Qualification for the CONCACAF Champions League |

Source: MLS
Rules for classification: 1) points; 2) head-to-head record; 3) goal difference; 4) number of goals scored
(C) MLS Cup champions; (S) Supporters' Shield winners; (U) U.S. Open Cup winners; (V) Canadian Championship winners

==== Results summary ====
| Overall | | | | | | | | Home | | | | | | Away | | | | | |
| Pld | Pts | W | L | D | GF | GA | GD | W | L | D | GF | GA | GD | W | L | D | GF | GA | GD |
|---|---|---|---|---|---|---|---|---|---|---|---|---|---|---|---|---|---|---|---|
| 34 | 49 | 14 | 13 | 7 | 50 | 49 | +1 | 10 | 4 | 3 | 31 | 20 | +11 | 4 | 9 | 4 | 19 | 29 | −10 |

Last updated: October 27, 2013
Source: 2013 Major League Soccer season
Pld = Matches played; Pts = Points; W = Matches won; D = Matches drawn; L = Matches lost; GF = Goals for; GA = Goals against; GD = Goal difference

==== Results by round ====
| Round | 1 | 2 | 3 | 4 | 5 | 6 | 7 | 8 | 9 | 10 | 11 | 12 | 13 | 14 | 15 | 16 | 17 | 18 | 19 | 20 | 21 | 22 | 23 | 24 | 25 | 26 | 27 | 28 | 29 | 30 | 31 | 32 | 33 | 34 |
|---|---|---|---|---|---|---|---|---|---|---|---|---|---|---|---|---|---|---|---|---|---|---|---|---|---|---|---|---|---|---|---|---|---|---|
| Ground | A | A | H | H | A | H | H | A | A | H | H | A | A | H | H | A | H | A | H | H | A | A | H | H | A | A | H | H | A | A | H | A | H | A |
| Result | W | W | W | W | L | D | W | D | L | W | W | W | L | W | L | D | D | L | D | W | L | L | W | W | D | W | L | L | D | L | L | L | W | L |

Updated to match(es) played on October 27, 2013. Source: Regular season matches
A = Away; H = Home; W = Win; D = Draw; L = Loss

==== Match results ====
Win Draw Loss

| March 2, 2013 Match 1 | Seattle Sounders FC | 0–1 | Montreal Impact | CenturyLink Field |
| | Evans (yellow card) 17' | Report | Arnaud 35'; Pisanu (yellow card) 64' | Attendance: 38,998; Referee: Silviu Petrescu |

| March 9, 2013 Match 2 | Portland Timbers | 1–2 | Montreal Impact | Jeld-Wen Field |
| | Nagbe (yellow card) 30'; Johnson 80' | Report | Camara 30'; Felipe 60' (yellow card) 73' | Attendance: 20,674; Referee: Edvin Jurisevic |

| March 16, 2013 Match 3 | Montreal Impact | 2–1 | Toronto FC | Olympic Stadium |
| | Bernier 34' (pen.) (yellow card) 64'; Di Vaio 45'; Iapichino (yellow card) 67' | Report | Hall (yellow card) 21'; Earnshaw 67' (pen.); Eckersley (yellow card) 90' | Attendance: 37,896; Referee: Baldomero Toledo |

| March 23, 2013 Match 4 | Montreal Impact | 1–0 | New York Red Bulls | Olympic Stadium |
| | Di Vaio 14'; Camara (yellow card) 85' | Report | Juninho (yellow card) 18'; Steele (yellow card) 42'; Barklage (yellow card) 66' (yellow-red card) 74'; Alexander (yellow card) 81' | Attendance: 26,259; Referee: Chris Penso |

| March 30, 2013 Match 5 | Sporting Kansas City | 2–0 | Montreal Impact | Sporting Park |
| | Bieler 5'; Collin (yellow card) 49'; Sinovic (yellow card) 53'; Zusi 80' | Report | Felipe (yellow card) 55' | Attendance: 18,609; Referee: Jorge Gonzalez |

| April 14, 2013 Match 6 | Montreal Impact | 1–1 | Columbus Crew | Saputo Stadium |
| | Arnaud (yellow card) 29'; Di Vaio 68' | Report | Williams (yellow card) 40'; Higuaín (yellow card) 58'; Oduro 72' | Attendance: 16,584; Referee: Mark Geiger |

| April 27, 2013 Match 7 | Montreal Impact | 2–0 | Chicago Fire | Saputo Stadium |
| | Iapichino (yellow card) 43'; Romero 57'; Di Vaio (yellow card) 64' (goal) 76'; Lefèvre (yellow card) 74' | Report | Larentowicz (red card) 63'; Johnson (yellow card) 64' | Attendance: 19,773; Referee: Fotis Bazakos |

| May 4, 2013 Match 8 | San Jose Earthquakes | 2–2 | Montreal Impact | Buck Shaw Stadium |
| | Morrow (yellow card) 19'; Cronin (yellow card) 45' (goal) 91'; Baca (yellow card) 52'; Jahn 59' | Report | Brovsky (yellow card) 22'; Mapp 24' 47'; Warner (yellow card) 31' | Attendance: 10,074; Referee: Drew Fischer |

| May 8, 2013 Match 9 | New York Red Bulls | 2–1 | Montreal Impact | Red Bull Arena |
| | Henry 45' 88' | Report | Di Vaio 90' | Attendance: 11,892; Referee: Hilario Grajeda |

| May 11, 2013 Match 10 | Montreal Impact | 3–2 | Real Salt Lake | Saputo Stadium |
| | Camara (yellow card) 29'; Felipe 39'; Di Vaio 80'; Tissot (yellow card) 89'; Nyassi (yellow card) 91'; Ferrari 93' (yellow card) 93' | Report | Ferrari OG 7'; Grabavoy (yellow card) 40'; Beckerman 77'; Rimando (yellow card) 91' | Attendance: 14,578; Referee: Allen Chapman |

| May 25, 2013 Match 11 | Montreal Impact | 5–3 | Philadelphia Union | Saputo Stadium |
| | Marco Di Vaio 2' 28' (yellow card) 29' (goal) 32'; Felipe (yellow card) 70'; Wenger 74'; Smith (yellow card) 91' (goal) 94' | Report | McInerney 5'; Farfan (yellow card) 44'; Hoppenot 69'; Le Toux 85' | Attendance: 17,104; Referee: Juan Guzman |

| June 1, 2013 Match 12 | Sporting Kansas City | 1–2 | Montreal Impact | Sporting Park |
| | Bieler 45+4'; Jerome (yellow card) 46'; Opara (yellow card) 52' | Report | Nyassi 47'; Warner 53'; Mapp (yellow card) 69'; Nesta (red card) 74'; Iapichino (yellow card) 90+4' | Attendance: 19,470; Referee: Armando Villarreal |

| June 15, 2013 Match 13 | Columbus Crew | 2–0 | Montreal Impact | Columbus Crew Stadium |
| | Sánchez 6' (yellow card) 56'; Oduro 6'; O'Rourke (yellow card) 82'; George (yellow card) 90' | Report | Felipe (yellow card) 9' | Attendance: 18,320; Referee: Matthew Foerster |

| June 19, 2013 Match 14 | Montreal Impact | 2–0 | Houston Dynamo | Saputo Stadium |
| | Felipe 14'; Ferrari (yellow card) 20'; Di Vaio 32'; Camara (yellow card) 56' | Report | Barnes (penalty missed) 22'; Sarkodie (yellow card) 53' | Attendance: 17,694; Referee: Chris Penso |

| June 29, 2013 Match 15 | Montreal Impact | 3–4 | Colorado Rapids | Saputo Stadium |
| | Camara 38'; Paponi 42' 72'; Brovsky (yellow card) 55' | Report | Harris 24'; Mera (yellow card) 48'; LaBrocca (yellow card) 52'; Powers 59'; Brown 77'; Cascio 90+6' | Attendance: 20,383; Referee: Drew Fischer |

| July 3, 2013 Match 16 | Toronto FC | 3–3 | Montreal Impact | BMO Field |
| | Brockie 6'; Caldwell 21'; O'Dea 24'; Russell (yellow card) 37'; Convey (yellow card) 45'; Agbossoumonde (yellow card) 47' | Report | Romero 1'; Brovsky (yellow card) 62'; Camara 69'; Di Vaio 70' | Attendance: 21,700; Referee: Baldomero Toledo |

| July 7, 2013 Match 17 | Montreal Impact | 1–1 | Chivas USA | Saputo Stadium |
| | Bernier 80' (pen.) (yellow card) 84' | Report | Borja (yellow card) 39'; Avila 55' | Attendance: 18,932; Referee: Allen Chapman |

| July 13, 2013 Match 18 | New York Red Bulls | 4–0 | Montreal Impact | Red Bull Arena |
| | Alexander 10'; Henry 16'; Olave (yellow card) 46'; Cahill 63'; Luyindula 88' | Report | Arnaud (yellow card) 45+1'; Ferrari (yellow card) 60' | Attendance: 17,235; Referee: Ricardo Salazar |

| July 20, 2013 Match 19 | Montreal Impact | 0–0 | FC Dallas | Saputo Stadium |
| | Paponi (yellow card) 61'; Arnaud (yellow card) 70' | Report | Watson (yellow card) 59'; Cooper (yellow card) 83'; Hassli (yellow card) 84' | Attendance: 20,801; Referee: Hilario Grajeda |

| July 27, 2013 Match 20 | Montreal Impact | 1–0 | Sporting Kansas City | Saputo Stadium |
| | Bernier (yellow card) 71'; Smith 90+6' | Report | Sinovic (yellow card) 1'; Joseph (yellow card) 24'; Bieler (yellow card) 70'; Rosell (yellow card) 88' | Attendance: 20,527; Referee: Armando Villarreal |

| August 3, 2013 Match 21 | D.C. United | 3–1 | Montreal Impact | RFK Stadium |
| | Silva 19'; Kitchen (yellow card) 29'; Korb (yellow card) 48'; Porter (yellow card) 65'; Doyle 68'; Jeffrey (yellow card) 87' (goal) 90+3' | Report | Brovsky 52'; Romero (yellow card) 62' | Attendance: 12,354; Referee: Allen Chapman |

| August 10, 2013 Match 22 | Chicago Fire | 2–1 | Montreal Impact | Toyota Park |
| | Lindpere 6'; Duka 23' | Report | Felipe 57'; Paponi (yellow card) 80'; Ferrari (yellow card) 89' | Attendance: 17,297; Referee: Juan Guzman |

| August 17, 2013 Match 23 | Montreal Impact | 2–1 | D.C. United | Saputo Stadium |
| | Di Vaio 43' 83' (yellow card) 84'; Romero (yellow card) 47'; Bernier (yellow card) 90+1' | Report | De Rosario (yellow card) 39'; Thorrington (yellow card) 71'; Riley (yellow card) 75'; Doyle 81' | Attendance: 20,801; Referee: Ismail Elfath |

| August 24, 2013 Match 24 | Montreal Impact | 5–0 | Houston Dynamo | Saputo Stadium |
| | Di Vaio 35' 70'; Felipe 37'; Brovsky 58'; Pisanu 90+1' | Report | Driver (yellow card) 72' | Attendance: 20,801; Referee: Hilario Grajeda |

| August 31, 2013 Match 25 | Philadelphia Union | 0–0 | Montreal Impact | PPL Park |
| | | Report | | Attendance: 18,339; Referee: Edvin Jurisevic |

| September 8, 2013 Match 26 | New England Revolution | 2–4 | Montreal Impact | Gillette Stadium |
| | Reis (red card) 5'; Fagundez 26'; Rowe 76' (yellow card) 83'; Tierney (yellow card) 87' | Report | Bernier 8' (pen.) 33' (pen.); Di Vaio 45+2' 55'; Brovsky (yellow card) 45+3' | Attendance: 9.165; Referee: Sorin Stoica |

| September 14, 2013 Match 27 | Montreal Impact | 1–2 | Columbus Crew | Saputo Stadium |
| | Di Vaio 23'; Felipe (yellow card) 77' | Report | Tchani (yellow card) 62'; Marshall 66'; Oduro 78' | Attendance: 20,210; Referee: Baldomero Toledo |

| September 21, 2013 Match 28 | Montreal Impact | 0–3 | Vancouver Whitecaps FC | Saputo Stadium |
| | Felipe (yellow card) 46'; Camara (yellow card) 54' | Report | Miller 7' (pen.); Reo-Coker (yellow card) 77'; Young-Pyo (yellow card) 78'; Camilo Sanvezzo 89' (yellow card) 90' (goal) 93' | Attendance: 20,006; Referee: Jorge Gonzalez |

| September 28, 2013 Match 29 | Chicago Fire | 2–2 | Montreal Impact | Toyota Park |
| | Pause (yellow card) 19'; Magee 57' 73' (penalty missed) 79' (yellow card) 84' | Report | Di Vaio 25'; Arnaud (yellow card) 70'; Tissot 87' | Attendance: 18,173; Referee: Armando Villarreal |

| October 4, 2013 Match 30 | Houston Dynamo | 1–0 | Montreal Impact | BBVA Compass Stadium |
| | Clark 6'; Creavalle (yellow card) 63' | Report | Brovsky (yellow card) 31'; Camara (yellow card) 32'; Ferrari (yellow card) 73' | Attendance: 19,892; Referee: Drew Fischer |

| October 12, 2013 Match 31 | Montreal Impact | 0–1 | New England Revolution | Saputo Stadium |
| | Nyassi (yellow card) 25'; Romero (yellow card) 45'; Ferrari (yellow card) 45'; Arnaud (yellow card) 82' | Report | Gonçalves 31'; Nguyen (yellow card) 45+4' | Attendance: 18,917; Referee: Chris Penso |

| October 16, 2013 Match 32 | Los Angeles Galaxy | 1–0 | Montreal Impact | StubHub Center |
| | Opare 68' (yellow card) 69' | Report | Warner (yellow card) 34'; Camara (yellow card) 48'; Romero (yellow card) 73' | Attendance: 13,320; Referee: Ricardo Salazar |

| October 19, 2013 Match 33 | Montreal Impact | 2–1 | Philadelphia Union | Saputo Stadium |
| | Di Vaio (yellow card) 56' (goal) 64'; Ferrari (yellow card) 78'; Ouimette 84'; Camara (yellow card) 89'; Pisanu (yellow card) 90+2' | Report | Fábio 29'; Carroll (yellow card) 39'; Casey (yellow card) 40'; Okugo (yellow card) 89' | Attendance: 18.993; Referee: Silviu Petrescu |

| October 26, 2013 Match 34 | Toronto FC | 1–0 | Montreal Impact | BMO Field |
| | Robert Earnshaw 16'; Earnshaw (yellow card) 23' | Report | Bernardello (yellow card) 23'; Mapp (yellow card) 26'; Lefevre (yellow card) 93'; Ferrari (yellow card) 94' | Attendance: 13.211; Referee: David Gantar |

=== Playoffs ===
Win Draw Loss

| October 31, 2013 Knockout Round | Houston Dynamo | 3–0 | Montreal Impact | BBVA Compass Stadium |
| | Bruin 16' 72'; García 27'; Ashe (yellow card) 89' | Report | Rivas (yellow card) 35' (yellow-red card) 70'; Di Vaio (red card) 89'; Romero (red card) 89' | Attendance: 10,476; Referee: Mark Geiger |

=== Canadian championship ===
Each round is a two-game aggregate goal series with the away goals rule.

Semifinals
1 | Vancouver | 3 | 2 | 5
4 | Edmonton | 2 | 0 | 2
2 | Montreal | 0 | 6 | 6
3 | Toronto | 2 | 0 | 2

Final
Vancouver | 0 | 2 | 2
Montreal | 0 | 2 | 2 (a)

Win Draw Loss

| April 24, 2013 Semi-Final Leg 1 | Toronto FC | 2–0 | Montreal Impact | BMO Field |
| | Henry 49'; Wiedeman 81' (yellow card) 84' | Report | Mallace (yellow card) 55' | Attendance: 11,043; Referee: Silviu Petrescu |

| May 1, 2013 Semi-Final Leg 2 | Montreal Impact | 6–0 | Toronto FC | Saputo Stadium |
| | Mapp 24'; Tissot (yellow card) 25'; Paponi 33'; Marco Di Vaio 44' 90'; Romero 61'; Andrew Wenger 90' | Report | Henry (yellow card) 14'; Lambe (yellow card) 17' | Attendance: 14,931; Referee: Drew Fischer |

| May 15, 2013 Final Leg 1 | Montreal Impact | 0–0 | Vancouver Whitecaps FC | Saputo Stadium |
| | Camara (yellow card) 25'; Warner (yellow card) 31'; Di Vaio (yellow card) 33' | Report | O'Brien (yellow card) 49' | Attendance: 12,016; Referee: Silviu Petrescu |

| May 29, 2013 Final Leg 2 | Vancouver Whitecaps FC | 2–2 | Montreal Impact | BC Place |
| | Camilo 4'; Kobayashi 69' | Report | Camara (yellow card) 6', (goal) 84'; Felipe 49' | Referee: Drew Fischer |

=== CONCACAF Champions League ===
The Montreal Impact will compete in the 2013–14 CONCACAF Champions League as a result of winning the 2013 Canadian Championship. The draw for the group stage was held on June 3, 2013.

| Team | Pld | W | D | L | GF | GA | GD | Pts | Qualification | SJ | MTL | HER |
|---|---|---|---|---|---|---|---|---|---|---|---|---|
| (United States) San Jose Earthquakes | 4 | 2 | 0 | 2 | 4 | 2 | +2 | 6 (Note: All three teams are tied on points, and so are ranked by overall goal difference, then overall goals scored.) | Advance to championship stage | | 3–0 | 1–0 |
| (Canada) Montreal Impact | 4 | 2 | 0 | 2 | 3 | 4 | −1 | 6 | | 1–0 | | 2–0 |
| (Guatemala) Heredia | 4 | 2 | 0 | 2 | 2 | 3 | −1 | 6 | | 1–0 | 1–0 | |

Legend: Blue = home team win; Yellow = draw; Red = away team win.
Notes:

Win Draw Loss

| August 7, 2013 Match 1 | Montreal Impact | 1–0 | San Jose Earthquakes | Saputo Stadium |
| | Warner (yellow card) 9'; Camara 16'; Mapp (yellow card) 71' | | Gordon (penalty missed) 11'; Corrales (yellow card) 36'; Wondolowski (yellow card) 84' | Attendance: 15,115; Referee: Javier Santos |

| August 21, 2013 Match 2 | Heredia | 1–0 | Montreal Impact | Estadio Cementos Progreso |
| | Ruíz (yellow card) 32'; Córdoba (penalty missed) 19' 88' | | Warner (yellow card) 32'; López (red card) 44'; Paponi (yellow card) 45' | Referee: Paul Delgadillo |

| September 17, 2013 Match 3 | San Jose Earthquakes | 3–0 | Montreal Impact | Buck Shaw Stadium |
| | Wondolowski 21'; Lenhart (yellow card) 40'; Chávez 57'; Salinas 84' | | Arnaud (yellow card) 23'; Camara (yellow card) 35'; Romero (yellow card) 62' | Attendance: 6,128; Referee: Armando Castro |

| September 24, 2013 Match 4 | Montreal Impact | 2–0 | Heredia | Saputo Stadium |
| | Paponi 4' (yellow card) 78'; Felipe (yellow card) 40'; Tissot (yellow card) 50'; Wenger 53' | report | | Attendance: 13,703; Referee: Courtney Campbell |

=== MLS reserves ===
The Montreal Impact will compete in the Eastern Division for the 2013 MLS Reserves season. This is the first year of the partnership between Major League Soccer and the USL Pro. As a result, Montreal will play the Rochester Rhinos twice and the results will count towards each teams respective tables. The division consists of seven teams, including Columbus Crew, Chicago Fire Soccer Club, FC Dallas, Houston Dynamo, New York Red Bulls, Rochester Rhinos and Toronto FC.

| Pos | Club | GP | W | L | T | GF | GA | GD | Pts | PPG |
|---|---|---|---|---|---|---|---|---|---|---|
| 1 | Houston Dynamo Reserves (C) | 9 | 5 | 4 | 0 | 12 | 16 | -4 | 15 | 1.67 |
| 2 | Columbus Crew Reserves | 14 | 6 | 6 | 2 | 28 | 26 | +2 | 20 | 1.43 |
| 3 | New York Red Bulls Reserves | 12 | 5 | 5 | 2 | 24 | 19 | +5 | 17 | 1.42 |
| 4 | Montreal Impact Reserves | 11 | 4 | 4 | 3 | 16 | 13 | +3 | 15 | 1.36 |
| 5 | Toronto FC Reserves | 8 | 3 | 4 | 1 | 15 | 12 | +3 | 10 | 1.25 |
| 6 | FC Dallas Reserves | 13 | 5 | 7 | 1 | 21 | 26 | -5 | 16 | 1.23 |
| 7 | Chicago Fire Reserves | 13 | 5 | 7 | 1 | 24 | 30 | -6 | 16 | 1.23 |

==== Match results ====
| March 24, 2013 Match 1 | Montreal Impact | 3–0 | New York Red Bulls | Olympic Stadium |
| | Wenger 16'; Luarca 29'; Smith 83' | Report | | Referee: M. Bourdeau |

| June 4, 2013 Match 2 | Montreal Impact | 5–1 | FC Dallas | Complexe sportif Claude-Robillard |
| | DelPiccolo 40'; Ndiaye 49'; Ndiaye (yellow card) 61'; Wenger 67'; Smith 81'; Lefèvre (yellow card) 82'; Smith 90' | Report | Baladez 63' | Referee: R. Schaap |

| June 7, 2013 Match 3 | Rochester Rhinos | 1–1 | Montreal Impact | Sahlen's Stadium |
| | McManus 19'; Brettschneider (yellow card) 43' | Report | Messoudi (yellow card) 53'; Meftouh (yellow card) 59'; Ouimette 87' | Referee: J. Douglas |

| June 16, 2013 Match 4 | Columbus Crew | 0–1 | Montreal Impact | Obetz Training Facility |
| | Tchani (yellow card) 26' (penalty missed) 81' | Report | Meftouh (yellow card) 9'; Ilcu 87' | Referee: Ted Unkel (Assistants: Joseph Kuzma, Tori Penso) |

| June 26, 2013 Match 5 | Montreal Impact | 0–5 | Toronto FC | Complexe sportif Claude-Robillard |
| | | Report | Koevermans 3' 19'; Bekker 27'; Braun 58'; Lambe 73' |

| July 14, 2013 Match 6 | New York Red Bulls | 0–0 | Montreal Impact | MSU Soccer Park |
| | | Report |

| July 21, 2013 Match 7 | Montreal Impact | 0–0 | Rochester Rhinos | Saputo Stadium |
| | Warner (red card) 54'; Bush (yellow card) 88' | Report | Banks (red card) 54'; Roberts (yellow card) 90' |

| August 11, 2013 Match 8 | Chicago Fire | 2–1 | Montreal Impact | Toyota Park |
| | Amarikwa 34' 59' (yellow card) 67' | Report | Smith 30'; Pisanu (yellow card) 48'; Warner (yellow card) 52' | Referee: Miguel Panduro |

| Postponed Match 9 | Toronto FC | v | Montreal Impact | KIA Training Ground |

| Postponed Match 10 | Montreal Impact | v | Houston Dynamo | Saputo Stadium |

| September 14, 2013 Match 11 | Montreal Impact | 3–0 | Columbus Crew | Saputo Stadium |
| | Pisanu 20'; Wenger 22'; Smith 48' | Report | Hyland (yellow card) 69'; Hyland (yellow card) 84' (red card); Job (yellow card) 86' |

| September 29, 2013 Match 12 | Chicago Fire | 3–2 | Montreal Impact | Toyota Park Practice Field |
| | Amarikwa 22' 26'; Soumare (yellow card) 36'; Santos 61' | Report | Paponi 5' 17' | Referee: Miguel Panduro |

| October 5, 2013 Match 13 | Houston Dynamo | 1–0 | Montreal Impact | HASP |
| | Cam Weaver 44' | | Jérémy Gagnon-Laparé (yellow card) 36' | Referee: Alejandro Mariscal (Assistants: Greg Boles, Gabriel Powell) |

| Cancelled Match 14 | FC Dallas | v | Montreal Impact | FC Dallas Stadium |

== Player information ==
=== Squad information ===
| No. | Name | Nationality | Position | Date of birth (age At Year End) | Previous club |
Goalkeepers
| 1 | Troy Perkins | (United States) | GK | July 29, 1981 (age 45) | (United States) Portland Timbers |
| 30 | Evan Bush | (United States) | GK | March 6, 1986 (age 40) | (Canada) Montreal Impact (NASL) |
| 40 | Maxime Crépeau | (Canada) | GK | May 11, 1994 (age 32) | (Canada) Montreal Impact Academy |
Defenders
| 2 | Nelson Rivas | (Colombia) | CB | March 25, 1983 (age 43) | (Italy) Inter Milan |
| 3 | Zarek Valentin | (United States) | RB | October 6, 1991 (age 35) | (United States) Chivas USA |
| 5 | Jeb Brovsky | (United States) | RB | December 3, 1988 (age 37) | (Canada) Vancouver Whitecaps FC |
| 6 | Hassoun Camara | (France) | CB\RB\DM | February 3, 1984 (age 42) | (Canada) Montreal Impact (NASL) |
| 13 | Matteo Ferrari | (Italy) \ (Algeria) | CB\LB | December 5, 1979 (age 46) | (Turkey) Beşiktaş J.K. |
| 14 | Alessandro Nesta | (Italy) | CB | March 19, 1976 (age 50) | (Italy) AC Milan |
| 26 | Adrián López Rodríguez | (Spain) | CB | February 25, 1987 (age 39) | (England) Wigan Athletic F.C. |
| 34 | Karl Ouimette | (Canada) | CB\LB | June 18, 1992 (age 34) | (Canada) Montreal Impact Academy |
| 51 | Maxim Tissot | (Canada) | LB | April 13, 1992 (age 34) | (Canada) Montreal Impact Academy |
Midfielders
| 7 | Felipe Martins | (Brazil) | AM | September 30, 1990 (age 36) | (Switzerland) FC Lugano |
| 8 | Patrice Bernier | (Canada) | DM | September 23, 1979 (age 47) | (Denmark) Lyngby Boldklub |
| 11 | Sanna Nyassi | (The Gambia) | RM/AM | January 31, 1989 (age 37) | (United States) Colorado Rapids |
| 16 | Calum Mallace | (Scotland) \ (United States) | DM | October 1, 1990 (age 36) | (United States) Marquette Golden Eagles |
| 18 | Collen Warner | (United States) | CM/DM | June 24, 1988 (age 38) | (United States) Real Salt Lake |
| 19 | Blake Smith | (United States) | LM | January 17, 1991 (age 35) | (United States) New Mexico Lobos |
| 21 | Justin Mapp | (United States) | LM/CM | October 18, 1984 (age 42) | (United States) Philadelphia Union |
| 22 | Davy Arnaud | (United States) | AM/RM | June 22, 1980 (age 46) | (United States) Sporting Kansas City |
| 23 | Hernán Bernardello | (Argentina) | DM | August 3, 1986 (age 40) | (Spain) UD Almería |
| 27 | Paolo DelPiccolo | (United States) | DM | May 28, 1991 (age 35) | (Germany) Eintracht Frankfurt |
| 28 | Siniša Ubiparipović | (Bosnia and Herzegovina) \ (United States) | CM | August 25, 1983 (age 43) | (Canada) Montreal Impact (NASL) |
| 31 | Andrea Pisanu | (Italy) | LM/AM | January 7, 1982 (age 44) | (Italy) Bologna |
| 43 | Zakaria Messoudi | (Canada) \ (Morocco) | AM | October 30, 1993 (age 33) | (Canada) Montreal Impact Academy |
| 55 | Wandrille Lefèvre | (France) \ (Canada) | DM | December 17, 1989 (age 36) | (Canada) Montreal Impact Academy |
| 98 | Maximiliano Rodriguez | (Argentina) | AM | April 1, 1994 (age 32) | (Argentina) Argentinos Juniors |
Attackers
| 9 | Marco Di Vaio | (Italy) | ST | July 15, 1976 (age 50) | (Italy) Bologna |
| 15 | Andrés Romero | (Argentina) | ST | October 29, 1989 (age 37) | (Brazil) Tombense |
| 33 | Andrew Wenger | (United States) | CB/ST | December 25, 1990 (age 35) | (United States) Duke Blue Devils |
| 35 | Daniele Paponi | (Italy) | ST | April 16, 1988 (age 38) | (Italy) Bologna |

=== Player transactions ===
==== In ====
| No. | Pos. | Player | Transferred from | Fee/notes | Date | Source |
|---|---|---|---|---|---|---|
| 19 | MF | (United States) Blake Smith | (United States) New Mexico Lobos | 2013 MLS SuperDraft | February 25, 2013 | |
| 55 | MF | (France) Wandrille Lefèvre | (Canada) Montreal Impact Academy | Graduated from the Academy | February 26, 2013 | |
| 51 | DF | (Canada) Maxim Tissot | (Canada) Montreal Impact Academy | Graduated from the Academy | February 26, 2013 | |
| 40 | GK | (Canada) Maxime Crépeau | (Canada) Montreal Impact Academy | Graduated from the Academy | March 5, 2013 | |
| 43 | MF | (Canada) Zakaria Messoudi | (Canada) Montreal Impact Academy | Graduated from the Academy | June 4, 2013 | |
| 94 | MF | (United States) Paolo DelPiccolo | (Germany) Eintracht Frankfurt | 2013 MLS SuperDraft | July 5, 2013 | |
| 23 | MF | (Argentina) Hernán Bernardello | (Spain) UD Almería | Free Transfer | July 23, 2013 | |
| 26 | DF | (Spain) Adrián López Rodríguez | (England) Wigan Athletic F.C. | Free Transfer | July 26, 2013 | |

==== Out ====
| No. | Pos. | Player | Transferred to | Fee/notes | Date | Source |
|---|---|---|---|---|---|---|
| 24 | GK | (Canada) Greg Sutton | None | Retired | October 26, 2012 | |
| 16 | FW | (Cuba) Eduardo Sebrango | None | Retired | November 1, 2012 | |
| 3 | DF | (Jamaica) Shavar Thomas | (United States) Fort Lauderdale Strikers | Option Declined | November 2, 2012 | |
| 36 | FW | (Canada) Evan James | (Canada) K-W United FC | Waived | November 2, 2012 | |
| 31 | DF | (United States) Josh Gardner | (United States) Sporting Kansas City | Traded for Kansas City's highest second round pick in the 2013 MLS SuperDraft | December 5, 2012 | |
| 23 | FW | (Italy) Bernardo Corradi | None | Retired | December 7, 2012 | |
| 27 | MF | (United States) Bryan Arguez | (United States) Minnesota Stars FC | Waived | December 7, 2012 | |
| 32 | MF | (Colombia) Miguel Montaño | (Colombia) Cúcuta Deportivo | Waived | December 7, 2012 | |
| 25 | MF | (United States) Lamar Neagle | (United States) Seattle Sounders FC | Traded for an international roster spot until December 31, 2014 | January 27, 2013 | |
| 17 | DF | (Switzerland) Dennis Iapichino | (United States) D.C. United | Waived | August 14, 2013 | |

==== Loans in ====
| No. | Pos. | Player | Loaned from | Loan End Date | Date | Source |
|---|---|---|---|---|---|---|
| 31 | MF | (Italy) Andrea Pisanu | (Italy) Bologna F.C. 1909 | December 31, 2013 | January 3, 2013 | |
| 15 | FW | (Argentina) Andrés Romero | (Brazil) Tombense | December 31, 2013 | February 7, 2013 | |
| 98 | MF | (Argentina) Maximiliano Rodriguez | (Argentina) Argentinos Juniors | December 31, 2013 | April 8, 2013 | |
| 35 | FW | (Italy) Daniele Paponi | (Italy) Bologna F.C. 1909 | December 31, 2013 | April 19, 2013 | |

==== Loans out ====
| No. | Pos. | Player | Loaned to | Loan End Date | Date | Source |
|---|---|---|---|---|---|---|
| 3 | DF | (United States) Zarek Valentin | (Norway) FK Bodø/Glimt | December 31, 2013 | March 26, 2013 | |
| 16 | MF | (Scotland) Calum Mallace | (United States) Minnesota United FC | December 31, 2013 | July 17, 2013 | |
| 28 | MF | (Bosnia and Herzegovina) Siniša Ubiparipović | (United States) Minnesota United FC | December 31, 2013 | July 17, 2013 | |

=== Starting 11 ===
| No. | Pos. | Nat. | Name | MS | Notes |
|---|---|---|---|---|---|
| 1 | GK | (United States) | Perkins | 10 | |
| 5 | RB | (United States) | Brovsky | 10 | |
| 13 | CB | (Italy) | Ferrari | 8 | |
| 14 | CB | (Italy) | Nesta | 5 | |
| 6 | LB | (France) | Camara | 10 | |
| 8 | DM | (Canada) | Bernier | 8 | |
| 15 | RM | (Argentina) | Romero | 8 | |
| 7 | CM | (Brazil) | Felipe | 10 | |
| 22 | CM | (United States) | Arnaud | 7 | |
| 21 | LM | (United States) | Mapp | 6 | |
| 9 | ST | (Italy) | Di Vaio | 9 | |

Last updated: May 8, 2013
Source: Squad stats and Start formations.
Only competitive matches.
Using the most used start formation.
Ordered by position on pitch (from back right to front left).

4–1–4–1 formation

== International Caps ==
Players called for senior international duty during the 2013 season while under contract with the Montreal Impact.

| Nationality | Position | Player | Competition | Date | Opponent | Minutes played | Score |
|---|---|---|---|---|---|---|---|
| (The Gambia) Gambia | MF | Sanna Nyassi | 2014 FIFA World Cup qualification | March 23, 2013 | v Ivory Coast | 90' | 0–3 |
| (The Gambia) Gambia | MF | Sanna Nyassi | 2014 FIFA World Cup qualification | June 8, 2013 | v Ivory Coast | 90' | 0–3 |
| (The Gambia) Gambia | MF | Sanna Nyassi | 2014 FIFA World Cup qualification | June 16, 2013 | v Morocco | 37' | 0–2 |
| Canada | MF | Jérémy Gagnon-Laparé* | Friendly | September 8, 2013 | v Mauritania | 19' | 0–0 |
| Canada | MF | Jérémy Gagnon-Laparé* | Friendly | September 10, 2013 | v Mauritania | 38' | 0–1 |
| Canada | DF | Karl Ouimette | Friendly | November 19, 2013 | v Slovenia | 4' | 0–1 |

*Montreal Impact Academy player.

== Management ==
- Sporting director — (Canada) Nick De Santis
- Director of Soccer operations — (United States) Matt Jordan
- Director, Montreal Impact Academy — (France) Philippe Eullaffroy
- Head coach — (Switzerland) Marco Schällibaum
- Assistant coach — (Canada) Mauro Biello
- Assistant coach — (France) Philippe Eullaffroy
- Goalkeeping coach — (Morocco) Youssef Dahha
- Physical Preparation Coach — (Canada) Paolo Pacione
- Team Manager — (Canada) Adam Braz
- Team Administrator — (Canada) Daniel Pozzi
- Equipment Coordinator — (Canada) Remy Eyckerman
- Equipment Manager — (Canada) Aldo Ricciuti
- Players Service — (England) Bradley Adam Smith

== Statistics ==
=== Appearances and goals ===
| No. | Pos | Nat | Player | Total | | Major League Soccer | | Canadian Championship | | CONCACAF Champions League | | MLS Cup Playoffs | |
| No. | Pos | Nat | Player | Apps | Goals | Apps | Goals | Apps | Goals | Apps | Goals | Apps | Goals |
Goalkeeper
| 1 | GK | (United States) USA | Troy Perkins | 34 | 0 | 33+0 | 0 | 0+0 | 0 | 0+0 | 0 | 1+0 | 0 |
| 30 | GK | (United States) USA | Evan Bush | 9 | 0 | 1+0 | 0 | 4+0 | 0 | 4+0 | 0 | 0+0 | 0 |
| 40 | GK | (Canada) CAN | Maxime Crépeau | 0 | 0 | 0+0 | 0 | 0+0 | 0 | 0+0 | 0 | 0+0 | 0 |
Defenders
| 2 | DF | (Colombia) COL | Nelson Rivas | 1 | 0 | 0+0 | 0 | 0+0 | 0 | 0+0 | 0 | 1+0 | 0 |
| 3 | DF | (United States) USA | Zarek Valentin | 0 | 0 | 0+0 | 0 | 0+0 | 0 | 0+0 | 0 | 0+0 | 0 |
| 5 | DF | (United States) USA | Jeb Brovsky | 38 | 2 | 29+1 | 2 | 4+0 | 0 | 3+0 | 0 | 1+0 | 0 |
| 6 | DF | (France) FRA | Hassoun Camara | 41 | 5 | 32+0 | 3 | 4+0 | 1 | 3+1 | 1 | 1+0 | 0 |
| 13 | DF | (Italy) ITA | Matteo Ferrari | 36 | 1 | 31+0 | 1 | 2+0 | 0 | 2+0 | 0 | 1+0 | 0 |
| 14 | DF | (Italy) ITA | Alessandro Nesta | 26 | 0 | 23+0 | 0 | 1+0 | 0 | 2+0 | 0 | 0+0 | 0 |
| 26 | DF | (Spain) ESP | Adrián López Rodríguez | 1 | 0 | 0+0 | 0 | 0+0 | 0 | 1+0 | 0 | 0+0 | 0 |
| 34 | DF | (Canada) CAN | Karl Ouimette | 9 | 1 | 6+1 | 1 | 1+0 | 0 | 1+0 | 0 | 0+0 | 0 |
| 51 | DF | (Canada) CAN | Maxim Tissot | 10 | 1 | 3+3 | 1 | 2+0 | 0 | 2+0 | 0 | 0+0 | 0 |
| 55 | MF | (France) FRA | Wandrille Lefèvre | 9 | 0 | 4+2 | 0 | 1+0 | 0 | 2+0 | 0 | 0+0 | 0 |
Midfielders
| 7 | MF | (Brazil) BRA | Felipe | 38 | 6 | 29+3 | 5 | 1+1 | 1 | 2+1 | 0 | 0+1 | 0 |
| 8 | MF | (Canada) CAN | Patrice Bernier | 37 | 4 | 28+3 | 4 | 4+0 | 0 | 1+1 | 0 | 0+0 | 0 |
| 11 | MF | (The Gambia) GAM | Sanna Nyassi | 28 | 1 | 11+11 | 1 | 1+1 | 0 | 2+2 | 0 | 0+0 | 0 |
| 16 | MF | (Scotland) SCO | Calum Mallace | 3 | 0 | 0+2 | 0 | 1+0 | 0 | 0+0 | 0 | 0+0 | 0 |
| 18 | MF | (United States) USA | Collen Warner | 25 | 1 | 9+8 | 1 | 2+2 | 0 | 3+0 | 0 | 1+0 | 0 |
| 19 | MF | (United States) USA | Blake Smith | 21 | 2 | 0+16 | 2 | 0+2 | 0 | 1+2 | 0 | 0+0 | 0 |
| 21 | MF | (United States) USA | Justin Mapp | 35 | 3 | 25+2 | 2 | 4+0 | 1 | 2+1 | 0 | 1+0 | 0 |
| 22 | MF | (United States) USA | Davy Arnaud | 27 | 1 | 21+3 | 1 | 1+0 | 0 | 2+0 | 0 | 0+0 | 0 |
| 23 | MF | (Argentina) ARG | Hernán Bernardello | 11 | 0 | 8+0 | 0 | 0+0 | 0 | 1+1 | 0 | 1+0 | 0 |
| 28 | MF | (Bosnia and Herzegovina) BIH | Siniša Ubiparipović | 2 | 0 | 0+1 | 0 | 0+1 | 0 | 0+0 | 0 | 0+0 | 0 |
| 31 | MF | (Italy) ITA | Andrea Pisanu | 17 | 1 | 8+6 | 1 | 0+1 | 0 | 1+0 | 0 | 1+0 | 0 |
| 43 | MF | (Canada) CAN | Zakaria Messoudi | 0 | 0 | 0+0 | 0 | 0+0 | 0 | 0+0 | 0 | 0+0 | 0 |
| 94 | MF | (United States) USA | Paolo DelPiccolo | 0 | 0 | 0+0 | 0 | 0+0 | 0 | 0+0 | 0 | 0+0 | 0 |
| 98 | MF | (Argentina) ARG | Maximiliano Rodriguez | 0 | 0 | 0+0 | 0 | 0+0 | 0 | 0+0 | 0 | 0+0 | 0 |
Forwards
| 9 | FW | (Italy) ITA | Marco Di Vaio | 40 | 22 | 31+2 | 20 | 2+1 | 2 | 1+2 | 0 | 1+0 | 0 |
| 15 | FW | (Argentina) ARG | Andrés Romero | 37 | 3 | 20+10 | 2 | 3+1 | 1 | 2+0 | 0 | 0+1 | 0 |
| 33 | FW | (United States) USA | Andrew Wenger | 32 | 3 | 8+16 | 1 | 4+0 | 1 | 2+1 | 1 | 1+0 | 0 |
| 35 | FW | (Italy) ITA | Daniele Paponi | 23 | 4 | 8+8 | 2 | 1+1 | 1 | 4+0 | 1 | 0+1 | 0 |
Players who left the club during the season: (Statistics shown are the appearances made and goals scored while at Montreal Impact)
| 17 | DF | (Switzerland) SUI | Dennis Iapichino | 11 | 0 | 7+2 | 0 | 1+1 | 0 | 0+0 | 0 | 0+0 | 0 |

Last updated: November 1, 2013
Source: Montreal Impact
Italic: denotes player is no longer with team

=== Goalkeeper stats ===
| No. | Nat. | Player | Total | | | Major League Soccer | | | Canadian Championship | | | CONCACAF Champions League | | | MLS Cup Playoffs | | |
| No. | Nat. | Player | MIN | GA | GAA | MIN | GA | GAA | MIN | GA | GAA | MIN | GA | GAA | MIN | GA | GAA |
| 1 | USA | Troy Perkins | 3060 | 51 | 1.50 | 2970 | 48 | 1.45 | 0 | 0 | 0.00 | 0 | 0 | 0.00 | 90 | 3 | 3.00 |
| 30 | USA | Evan Bush | 810 | 9 | 1.00 | 90 | 1 | 1.00 | 360 | 4 | 1.00 | 360 | 4 | 1.00 | 0 | 0 | 0.00 |
| 40 | CAN | Maxime Crépeau | 0 | 0 | 0.00 | 0 | 0 | 0.00 | 0 | 0 | 0.00 | 0 | 0 | 0.00 | 0 | 0 | 0.00 |

Updated to match played November 1, 2013
Source: Montreal Impact

=== Top scorers ===
| No. | Nat. | Player | Pos. | Major League Soccer | Canadian Championship | CONCACAF Champions League | MLS Cup Playoffs | TOTAL |
|---|---|---|---|---|---|---|---|---|
| 9 | (Italy) | Marco Di Vaio | FW | 20 | 2 | | | 22 |
| 7 | (Brazil) | Felipe | MF | 5 | 1 | | | 6 |
| 6 | (France) | Hassoun Camara | DF | 3 | 1 | 1 | | 5 |
| 8 | (Canada) | Patrice Bernier | MF | 4 | | | | 4 |
| 35 | (Italy) | Daniele Paponi | FW | 2 | 1 | 1 | | 4 |
| 15 | (Argentina) | Andrés Romero | FW | 2 | 1 | | | 3 |
| 21 | (United States) | Justin Mapp | MF | 2 | 1 | | | 3 |
| 33 | (United States) | Andrew Wenger | FW | 1 | 1 | 1 | | 3 |
| 5 | (United States) | Jeb Brovsky | DF | 2 | | | | 2 |
| 19 | (United States) | Blake Smith | MF | 2 | | | | 2 |
| 11 | (The Gambia) | Sanna Nyassi | MF | 1 | | | | 1 |
| 13 | (Italy) | Matteo Ferrari | DF | 1 | | | | 1 |
| 18 | (United States) | Collen Warner | MF | 1 | | | | 1 |
| 22 | (United States) | Davy Arnaud | MF | 1 | | | | 1 |
| 31 | (Italy) | Andrea Pisanu | MF | 1 | | | | 1 |
| 34 | (Canada) | Karl Ouimette | DF | 1 | | | | 1 |
| 51 | (Canada) | Maxim Tissot | DF | 1 | | | | 1 |
| Totals | | | | 50 | 8 | 3 | 0 | 61 |

Updated to match played October 27, 2013
Source: Montreal Impact

=== Top assists ===
| No. | Nat. | Player | Pos. | Major League Soccer | Canadian Championship | CONCACAF Champions League | MLS Cup Playoffs | TOTAL |
|---|---|---|---|---|---|---|---|---|
| 21 | (United States) | Justin Mapp | MF | 8 | 2 | | | 10 |
| 7 | (Brazil) | Felipe | MF | 8 | | | | 8 |
| 8 | (Canada) | Patrice Bernier | MF | 8 | | | | 8 |
| 22 | (United States) | Davy Arnaud | MF | 5 | | | | 5 |
| 9 | (Italy) | Marco Di Vaio | FW | 2 | 2 | | | 4 |
| 6 | (France) | Hassoun Camara | DF | 3 | | | | 3 |
| 33 | (United States) | Andrew Wenger | FW | 3 | | | | 3 |
| 5 | (United States) | Jeb Brovsky | DF | 2 | | | | 2 |
| 15 | (Argentina) | Andrés Romero | FW | 2 | | | | 2 |
| 51 | (Canada) | Maxim Tissot | DF | 1 | | 1 | | 2 |
| 11 | (The Gambia) | Sanna Nyassi | MF | 1 | | | | 1 |
| 13 | (Italy) | Matteo Ferrari | DF | 1 | | | | 1 |
| 14 | (Italy) | Alessandro Nesta | DF | 1 | | | | 1 |
| 19 | (United States) | Blake Smith | MF | 1 | | | | 1 |
| 23 | (Argentina) | Hernán Bernardello | MF | | | 1 | | 1 |
| 31 | (Italy) | Andrea Pisanu | MF | 1 | | | | 1 |
| 35 | (Italy) | Daniele Paponi | FW | 1 | | | | 1 |
| 55 | (France) | Wandrille Lefèvre | DF | 1 | | | | 1 |
| Totals | | | | 49 | 4 | 2 | 0 | 55 |

Updated to match played October 27, 2013
Source: Montreal Impact

=== Clean sheets ===
| No. | Nat. | Player | Major League Soccer | Canadian Championship | CONCACAF Champions League | MLS Cup Playoffs | TOTAL |
|---|---|---|---|---|---|---|---|
| 1 | (United States) | Troy Perkins | 8 | | | | 8 |
| 30 | (United States) | Evan Bush | | 2 | 2 | | 4 |
| Totals | | | 8 | 2 | 2 | 0 | 12 |

Updated to match played October 27, 2013
Source: Montreal Impact

=== Penalties saved ===
| No. | Nat. | Player | Major League Soccer | Canadian Championship | CONCACAF Champions League | MLS Cup Playoffs | TOTAL |
|---|---|---|---|---|---|---|---|
| 1 | (United States) | Troy Perkins | 2 | | | | 2 |
| 30 | (United States) | Evan Bush | | | 2 | | 2 |
| Totals | | | 2 | 0 | 2 | 0 | 4 |

Updated to match played October 27, 2013
Source: Montreal Impact

=== Own goals ===
| No. | Nat. | Player | Pos. | Major League Soccer | Canadian Championship | CONCACAF Champions League | MLS Cup Playoffs | TOTAL |
|---|---|---|---|---|---|---|---|---|
| 13 | (Italy) | Matteo Ferrari | DF | 1 | | | | 1 |
| Totals | | | | 1 | 0 | 0 | 0 | 1 |

Updated to match played October 27, 2013
Source: Major League Soccer

=== Top minutes played ===
| No. | Nat. | Player | Pos. | Major League Soccer | Canadian Championship | CONCACAF Champions League | MLS Cup Playoffs | TOTAL |
|---|---|---|---|---|---|---|---|---|
| 6 | (France) | Hassoun Camara | DF | 2874 | 360 | 315 | 90 | 3639 |
| 5 | (United States) | Jeb Brovsky | DF | 2610 | 352 | 270 | 90 | 3322 |
| 13 | (Italy) | Matteo Ferrari | DF | 2790 | 180 | 180 | 90 | 3240 |
| 9 | (Italy) | Marco Di Vaio | FW | 2746 | 232 | 148 | 89 | 3215 |
| 1 | (United States) | Troy Perkins | GK | 2970 | | | 90 | 3060 |
| 8 | (Canada) | Patrice Bernier | MF | 2474 | 360 | 99 | | 2933 |
| 21 | (United States) | Justin Mapp | MF | 2137 | 330 | 189 | 90 | 2746 |
| 7 | (Brazil) | Felipe | MF | 2350 | 116 | 152 | 28 | 2646 |
| 14 | (Italy) | Alessandro Nesta | FW | 1939 | 90 | 180 | | 2209 |
| 15 | (Argentina) | Andrés Romero | FW | 1672 | 264 | 171 | 34 | 2141 |

Updated to match played November 1, 2013
Source: Montreal Impact

=== Disciplinary record ===
Includes all competitive matches. The list is sorted by shirt number.

| N | P | Nat. | Name | Major League Soccer | | | Canadian Championship | | | CONCACAF Champions League | | | MLS Cup Playoffs | | | Total | | | Notes |
| N | P | Nat. | Name | Yellow card | Second yellow card | Red card | Yellow card | Second yellow card | Red card | Yellow card | Second yellow card | Red card | Yellow card | Second yellow card | Red card | Yellow card | Second yellow card | Red card | Notes |
| 2 | DF | (Colombia) | Nelson Rivas | | | | | | | | | | 1 | 1 | | 1 | 1 | | |
| 5 | DF | (United States) | Jeb Brovsky | 5 | | | | | | | | | | | | 5 | | | |
| 6 | DF | (France) | Hassoun Camara | 7 | | | 2 | | | 1 | | | | | | 10 | | | |
| 7 | MF | (Brazil) | Felipe | 6 | | | | | | 1 | | | | | | 7 | | | |
| 8 | MF | (Canada) | Patrice Bernier | 4 | | | | | | | | | | | | 4 | | | |
| 9 | FW | (Italy) | Marco Di Vaio | 4 | | | 1 | | | | | | | | 1 | 5 | | 1 | |
| 11 | MF | (The Gambia) | Sanna Nyassi | 2 | | | | | | | | | | | | 2 | | | |
| 13 | DF | (Italy) | Matteo Ferrari | 8 | | | | | | | | | | | | 8 | | | |
| 14 | DF | (Italy) | Alessandro Nesta | | | 1 | | | | | | | | | | | | 1 | |
| 15 | FW | (Argentina) | Andrés Romero | 4 | | | | | | 1 | | | | | 1 | 5 | | 1 | |
| 16 | MF | (Scotland) | Calum Mallace | | | | 1 | | | | | | | | | 1 | | | |
| 17 | DF | (Switzerland) | Dennis Iapichino | 3 | | | | | | | | | | | | 3 | | | |
| 18 | MF | (United States) | Collen Warner | 2 | | | 1 | | | 2 | | | | | | 5 | | | |
| 19 | MF | (United States) | Blake Smith | 1 | | | | | | | | | | | | 1 | | | |
| 21 | MF | (United States) | Justin Mapp | 2 | | | | | | 1 | | | | | | 3 | | | |
| 22 | MF | (United States) | Davy Arnaud | 5 | | | | | | 1 | | | | | | 6 | | | |
| 23 | MF | (Argentina) | Hernán Bernardello | 1 | | | | | | 1 | | | | | | 2 | | | |
| 26 | DF | (Spain) | Adrián López Rodríguez | | | | | | | | | 1 | | | | | | 1 | |
| 31 | MF | (Italy) | Andrea Pisanu | 2 | | | | | | | | | | | | 2 | | | |
| 35 | FW | (Italy) | Daniele Paponi | 2 | | | | | | 1 | | | | | | 3 | | | |
| 51 | DF | (Canada) | Maxim Tissot | 1 | | | 1 | | | 1 | | | | | | 3 | | | |
| 55 | MF | (France) | Wandrille Lefèvre | 2 | | | | | | | | | | | | 2 | | | |

Last updated: November 1, 2013
Source: Competitive matches
Ordered by (red card) , (second yellow card) and (yellow card)
(yellow card) = Number of bookings; (second yellow card) = Number of sending offs after a second yellow card; (red card) = Number of sending offs by a direct red card.

Italic: denotes no longer with club.

== Recognition ==
=== MLS Player of the Week ===
| Week | Player/Manager | Nation | Position | Report |
|---|---|---|---|---|
| 13 | Di Vaio | Italy | FW | MLS Player of the Week: 13 |
| 28 | Di Vaio | Italy | FW | MLS Player of the Week: 28 |

=== MLS Team of the Week ===
| Week | Player | Nation | Position | Report |
|---|---|---|---|---|
| 1 | Arnaud | United States | MF | MLS Team of the Week: 1 |
| 2 | Bernier | Canada | MF | MLS Team of the Week: 2 |
| 3 | Bernier | Canada | MF | MLS Team of the Week: 3 |
| 3 | Di Vaio | Italy | FW | MLS Team of the Week: 3 |
| 4 | Bernier | Canada | MF | MLS Team of the Week: 4 |
| 4 | Di Vaio | Italy | FW | MLS Team of the Week: 4 |
| 10 | Mapp | United States | MF | MLS Team of the Week: 10 |
| 13 | Mapp | United States | MF | MLS Team of the Week: 13 |
| 13 | Di Vaio | Italy | FW | MLS Team of the Week: 13 |
| 14 | Felipe | Brazil | MF | MLS Team of the Week: 14 |
| 14 | Ferrari | Italy | FW | MLS Team of the Week: 14 |
| 18 | Camara | France | DF | MLS Team of the Week: 18 |
| 18 | Paponi | Italy | FW | MLS Team of the Week: 18 |
| 25 | Felipe | Brazil | MF | MLS Team of the Week: 25 |
| 25 | Di Vaio | Italy | FW | MLS Team of the Week: 25 |
| 26 | Mapp | United States | MF | MLS Team of the Week: 26 |
| 26 | Di Vaio | Italy | FW | MLS Team of the Week: 26 |
| 28 | Di Vaio | Italy | FW | MLS Team of the Week: 28 |
| 31 | Brovsky | United States | DF | MLS Team of the Week: 31 |
| 34 | Di Vaio | Italy | FW | MLS Team of the Week: 34 |

=== MLS Coach of the Week ===
| Week | Player/Manager | Nation | Report |
|---|---|---|---|
| 1 | Schällibaum | Switzerland | MLS Team of the Week: 1 |
| 3 | Schällibaum | Switzerland | MLS Team of the Week: 3 |
| 28 | Schällibaum | Switzerland | MLS Team of the Week: 28 |

=== MLS Save of the Week ===
| Week | Player/Manager | Nation | Save | Report |
|---|---|---|---|---|
| 3 | Perkins | United States | 53' | SOTW |

=== 2013 MLS All-Star ===
| Year | Player | Nation | Position | Report |
|---|---|---|---|---|
| 2013 | Bernier | Canada | MF | MLS All-Star |
| 2013 | Di Vaio | Italy | FW | MLS All-Star |
| 2013 | Mapp | United States | MF | MLS All-Star |

== Miscellany ==
=== International roster slots ===
Montreal has eleven MLS International Roster Slots for use in the 2013 season. Each club in Major League Soccer is allocated eight international roster spots and Montreal acquired the extra slots in trades with Chivas USA, Seattle Sounders FC and Portland Timbers.

Montreal Impact International slots
| Slot | Player | Nationality |
|---|---|---|
| 1 | Hernán Bernardello | Argentina |
| 2 | Hassoun Camara | France |
| 3 | Matteo Ferrari | Italy |
| 4 | Alessandro Nesta | Italy |
| 5 | Felipe | Brazil |
| 6 | Andrea Pisanu | Italy |
| 7 | Marco Di Vaio | Italy |
| 8 | Andrés Romero | Argentina |
| 9 | Nelson Rivas | Colombia |
| 10 | Daniele Paponi | Italy |
| 11 | Vacant | |
| IR | Maximiliano Rodriguez | Argentina |
| IR | Adrián López Rodríguez | Spain |

Foreign-Born Players with Domestic Status
| Player | Nationality |
|---|---|
| Sanna Nyassi | (The Gambia) Gambia / (United States) |
| Siniša Ubiparipović | Bosnia and Herzegovina / (United States) |
| Calum Mallace | (Scotland) Scotland^{G} |
| Wandrille Lefèvre | France ^{C} |

- (Canada) – Player is Canadian citizen;
- (United States) – Player is U.S. citizen;
- G – Player has U.S. green card;
- C – Player has permanent Canadian residency.
