= Wandrille Lefèvre =

French-born Canadian soccer player (born 1989)

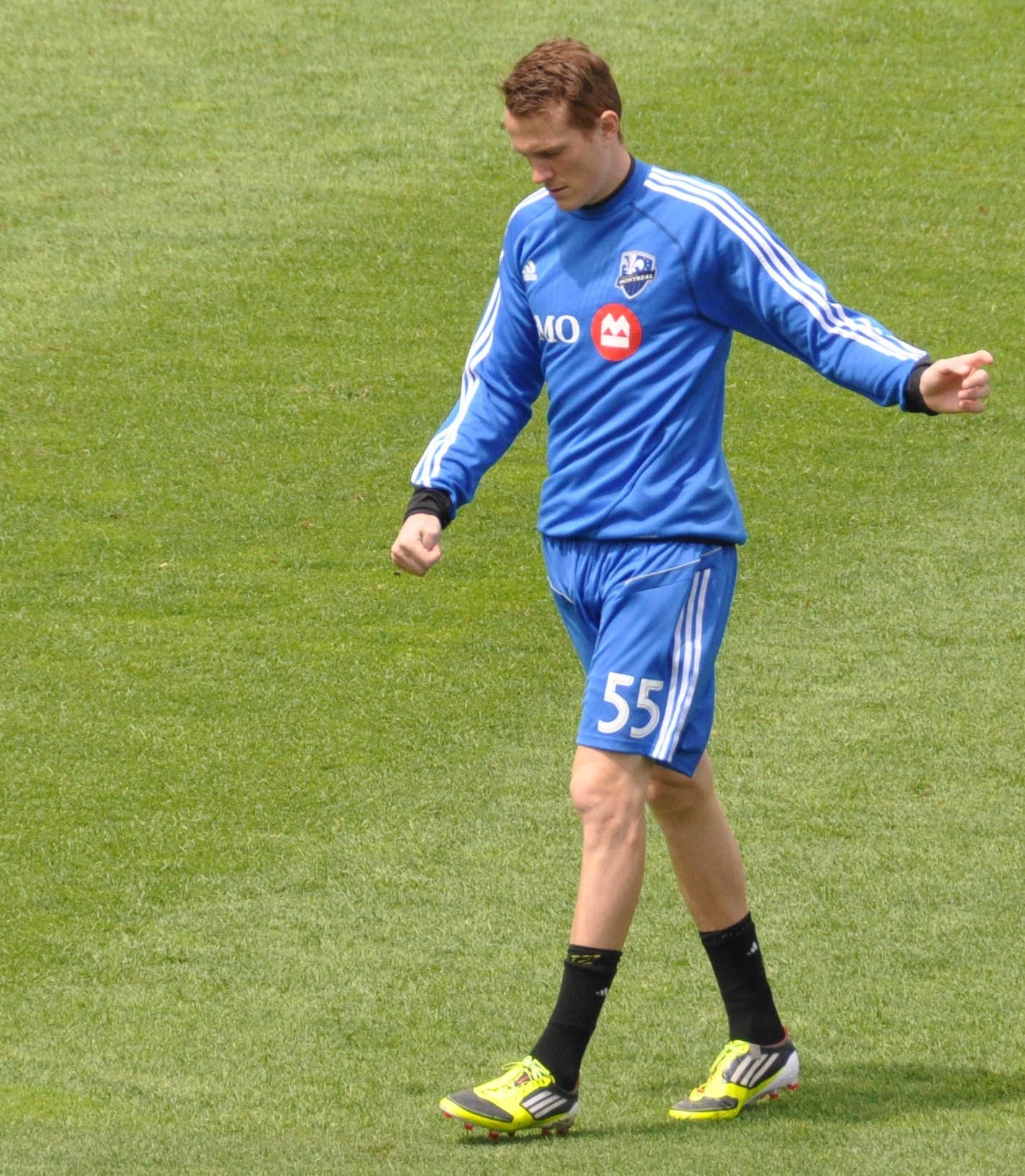
- Lefèvre with Montreal Impact in 2013

Personal information
- Date of birth: December 17, 1989 (age 36)
- Place of birth: Chartres, France
- Height: 1.85 m (6 ft 1 in)
- Position: Centre back

Team information
- Current team: AS Blainville
- Number: 5

Youth career
- 1998–2003: Montpellier HSC
- 2003–2007: Montreal-Concordia
- 2011–2013: Montreal Impact

College career
| Years | Team | Apps | (Gls) |
| 2007–2010 | Montreal Carabins | | |

Senior career*
| Years | Team | Apps | (Gls) |
| 2011–2012 | Montreal Impact Academy | ? | (?) |
| 2011 | Montreal Impact (NASL) | 2 | (0) |
| 2013–2017 | Montreal Impact | 48 | (2) |
| 2015–2016 | → FC Montreal (loan) | 3 | (0) |
| 2017 | → Ottawa Fury (loan) | 2 | (0) |
| 2019–2021 | AS Blainville | 34 | (2) |
| 2022–2023 | FC Laval | 36 | (1) |
| 2024– | AS Blainville | 21 | (2) |

International career^{‡}
| 2015–2017 | Canada | 3 | (0) |
- * Club domestic league appearances and goals as of September 8, 2025 ‡ National team caps and goals as of January 22, 2017

Wandrille Lefèvre (born December 17, 1989) is a soccer player who plays as a centre back for AS Blainville in Ligue1 Quebec. Born in France, he played for the Canada national team.

== Career ==
=== Amateur ===
Lefèvre played with the youth teams of OC Perpignan, a satellite club of Montpellier HSC. In 2003, he moved to Montreal with his family where he played soccer with the Montreal-Concordia club. He attended College Stanislas for secondary.

Lefèvre played four seasons for the Université de Montréal Carabins. He was named CIS Second Team All Star and RSEQ First Team All Star in 2008 and to the 2009 RSEQ Second Team All Star.

=== Professional ===
In 2011, he began playing with the Montreal Impact Academy in the Canadian Soccer League. Lefèvre would help Montreal secure a playoff berth in the league's first division. He would contribute a goal in the opening round of the playoffs against Capital City. However, the academy side would be eliminated from the tournament in the second match against the Ottawa-based club.

He had another run with Montreal's academy in the 2012 season. The Impact would secure another playoff berth by finishing second in the division. In the first round of the postseason, Montreal would defeat Toronto FC's academy to advance to the next round. Lefèvre would record a goal in the semifinal match against the York Region Shooters that secured Montreal a berth in the championship finals. He would participate in the championship final match against Toronto Croatia where Montreal was defeated. He was a finalist for the 2012 CSL MVP award.

Lefèvre made his debut for the senior Montreal Impact (NASL) in the North American Soccer League on June 26, 2011, against FC Edmonton. In 2012, he trained regularly with the first team, playing eight MLS Reserve League games.

On February 26, 2013, Lefèvre signed a Homegrown Player contract with the Montreal Impact. On April 27, 2013, he made his debut for the Montreal Impact against the Chicago Fire as a sub in the 54' minute coming on for Alessandro Nesta.

On August 15, 2017, Lefèvre was loaned to the Ottawa Fury.

Lefèvre was waived by Montreal on January 18, 2018.

After a year away from the pitch, Lefévre joined Canadian club AS Blainville in the winter 2019. He made fifteen appearances for Blainville that season, scoring one goal.

In 2022, he joined FC Laval, helping them win the PLSQ title.

=== International ===
Lefèvre became a Canadian citizen in July 2015. He received his first call-up to Canada on October 2, 2015, for a friendly match against Ghana at RFK Stadium. Lefèvre earned his first international cap as a starter in the match, a 1–1 draw on October 13, 2015.

== Personal life ==
Lefèvre previously held Canadian permanent residency which qualified him as a domestic player on Canadian teams for MLS roster purposes. On July 2, 2015, he became a Canadian citizen.

== Career statistics ==
=== Club ===
As of September 15, 2025

| Club | League | Season | League | | Playoffs | | Domestic Cup | | League Cup | | Continental | | Total | | |
| Club | League | Season | Apps | Goals | Apps | Goals | Apps | Goals | Apps | Goals | Apps | Goals | Apps | Goals | |
|---|---|---|---|---|---|---|---|---|---|---|---|---|---|---|---|
| Montreal Impact | NASL | 2011 | 2 | 0 | – | | – | | – | | – | | 2 | 0 | |
| Montreal Impact | MLS | 2013 | 6 | 0 | 0 | 0 | 1 | 0 | – | | 2 | 0 | 8 | 0 | |
| Montreal Impact | MLS | 2014 | 15 | 0 | – | | 2 | 0 | – | | 3 | 0 | 20 | 0 | |
| Montreal Impact | MLS | 2015 | 11 | 2 | 0 | 0 | 3 | 0 | – | | – | | 14 | 2 | |
| Montreal Impact | MLS | 2016 | 13 | 0 | 0 | 0 | 2 | 0 | – | | – | | 16 | 0 | |
| Montreal Impact | MLS | 2017 | 3 | 0 | – | | 3 | 0 | – | | – | | 6 | 0 | |
| Montreal Impact | Total | | 50 | 2 | 1 | 0 | 11 | 0 | 0 | 0 | 5 | 0 | 67 | 2 | |
| FC Montreal (loan) | USL | 2015 | 2 | 0 | – | | – | | – | | – | | 2 | 0 | |
| FC Montreal (loan) | USL | 2016 | 1 | 0 | – | | – | | – | | – | | 1 | 0 | |
| FC Montreal (loan) | Total | | 3 | 0 | 0 | 0 | 0 | 0 | 0 | 0 | 0 | 0 | 3 | 0 | |
| Ottawa Fury FC (loan) | USL | 2017 | 2 | 0 | – | | 0 | 0 | – | | – | | 2 | 0 | |
| A.S. Blainville | PLSQ | 2019 | 15 | 1 | – | | 0 | 0 | 3 | 0 | – | | 18 | 1 | |
| A.S. Blainville | PLSQ | 2020 | 7 | 1 | – | | – | | – | | – | | 7 | 1 | |
| A.S. Blainville | PLSQ | 2021 | 12 | 1 | – | | – | | – | | – | | 12 | 1 | |
| A.S. Blainville | Total | | 34 | 3 | 0 | 0 | 0 | 0 | 3 | 0 | 0 | 0 | 37 | 3 | |
| FC Laval | PLSQ | 2022 | 21 | 1 | – | | – | | 2 | 0 | – | | 23 | 1 | |
| FC Laval | Ligue1 Québec | 2023 | 15 | 0 | – | | – | | 1 | 0 | – | | 16 | 0 | |
| FC Laval | Total | | 36 | 1 | 0 | 0 | 0 | 0 | 3 | 0 | 0 | 0 | 39 | 1 | |
| A.S. Blainville | Ligue1 Québec | 2024 | 14 | 1 | – | | – | | 1 | 0 | – | | 15 | 1 | |
| A.S. Blainville | Ligue1 Québec | 2025 | 7 | 1 | – | | – | | 0 | 0 | – | | 7 | 1 | |
| A.S. Blainville | Career total | | | 146 | 8 | 0 | 0 | 11 | 0 | 7 | 0 | 5 | 0 | 170 | 8 |

=== International ===
As of January 22, 2017

Canada national team
| Year | Apps | Goals |
|---|---|---|
| 2015 | 1 | 0 |
| 2016 | 1 | 0 |
| 2017 | 1 | 0 |
| Total | 3 | 0 |

== Honours ==
=== Club ===
Montreal Impact

- Canadian Championship: 2013, 2014

Montreal Impact Academy

- CSL Championship Runners-up: 2012
