= Hassoun Camara =

French footballer (born 1984)

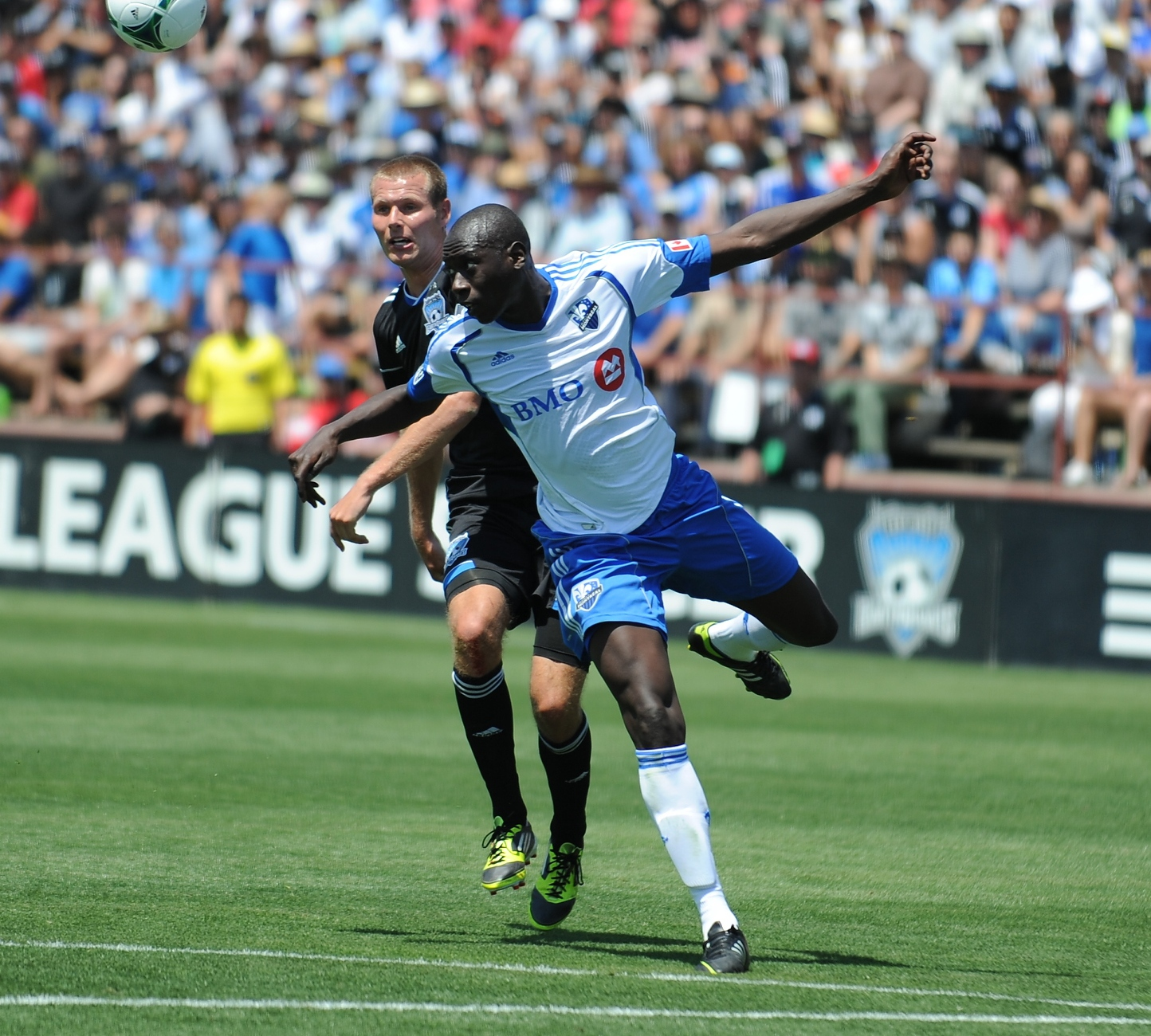

Personal information
- Full name: Hassoun Camara
- Date of birth: 3 February 1984 (age 42)
- Place of birth: Noisy-le-Sec, France
- Height: 1.88 m (6 ft 2 in)
- Position: Full-back

Senior career*
Years	Team	Apps	(Gls)
2003–2006	Olympique Noisy-le-Sec	67	(1)
2006–2008	Marseille	0	(0)
2008–2010	Bastia	39	(4)
2011	Montreal Impact (NASL)	22	(2)
2012–2017	Montreal Impact	134	(7)
2015	→ FC Montreal (loan)	1	(0)
Total		263	(14)
- * Club domestic league appearances and goals as of 20:43, 6 July 2018 (UTC)

Hassoun Camara (born 3 February 1984) is a French former professional footballer who played as a full-back.

== Career ==
=== France ===
Camara began his career with his hometown club, Olympique Noisy-le-Sec, appearing in 67 matches and scoring 1 goal. He signed his first full professional contract with Olympique de Marseille in 2006; however, after a few months with the Provence club, he was unable to overtake incumbent starter Habib Beye and in search of playing time, he signed a three-year contract with Ligue 2 club SC Bastia, playing primarily as a rightback or centerback. He had his most productive season during the 2008–09 Ligue 2 season with 26 appearances and three goals. He scored his first goal as a professional on 22 February 2008, against Libourne Saint-Seurin. The following season, he fell out of favor with the club and terminated his contract with Bastia on 18 January 2010.

=== Canada ===
On 7 February 2011, Camara signed with the Montreal Impact of the North American Soccer League. In his first season with Montreal, Camara appeared in 22 league matches and scored 2 goals as he was named the club's most valuable player. After a successful first season with Montreal, in which he was regarded as one of the top players in the North American Soccer League, Camara re-signed with Montreal Impact on 11 October 2011 for the club's inaugural 2012 season in Major League Soccer. On 29 May 2013 he scored the cup-winning goal for the Montreal Impact in the Canadian Championship final against the Vancouver Whitecaps; this goal allowed the Montreal Impact to qualify for the CONCACAF Champions League for the second time in the team's history.

On 11 June 2014, he played his hundredth match across all competitions for the Montreal Impact against D.C. United.

Camara was released by Montreal on 16 November 2017. He announced his retirement from professional soccer on 12 December 2017, citing an accumulation of injuries.

== Career statistics ==
=== Club ===
Team	League	Season	Domestic League			Domestic Playoffs			Domestic Cup^{1}			Concacaf Competition^{2}			Total		
Team	League	Season	Apps	Goals	Assists	Apps	Goals	Assists	Apps	Goals	Assists	Apps	Goals	Assists	Apps	Goals	Assists
Montreal Impact	NASL	2011	22	2	1	-	-	-	-	-	-	-	-	-	22	2	1
Montreal Impact	MLS	2012	20	1	2	-	-	-	1	0	0	-	-	-	21	1	2
Montreal Impact	MLS	2013	32	3	3	1	0	0	4	1	0	4	1	0	41	5	3
Montreal Impact	MLS	2014	28	1	1	-	-	-	2	0	0	-	-	-	30	1	1
Montreal Impact	MLS	2015	9	0	0	1	0	0									
Montreal Impact	MLS	2016	27	2	2	5	0	0									
Montreal Impact	MLS	2017	18	0	0	-	-	-									
		Total NASL	22	2	1	–	–	–	–	–	–	–	–	–	22	2	1
		Total MLS	134	7	8	1	0	0	7	1	0	4	0	0	73	6	5

== Honours ==
Montreal Impact

- Canadian Championship: 2013, 2014
