= 2014 Canadian Championship =

2014 professional soccer tournament

2014 Amway Canadian Championship (in English) Championnat Canadien Amway 2014 (in French)

Tournament details
- Country: Canada
- Dates: April 23 – June 4
- Teams: 5 (from 2 leagues)

Final positions
- Champions: Montreal Impact (2nd title)
- Runners-up: Toronto FC

Tournament statistics
- Matches played: 8
- Goals scored: 22 (2.75 per match)
- Attendance: 91,937 (11,492 per match)
- Top goal scorer: Jack McInerney (3 goals)

Awards
- George Gross Memorial Trophy: Justin Mapp

The 2014 Canadian Championship (officially the Amway Canadian Championship for sponsorship reasons) was a soccer tournament hosted and organized by the Canadian Soccer Association that took place in the cities of Edmonton, Montreal, Ottawa, Toronto and Vancouver in 2014. For the first time in the history of the tournament, the Ottawa Fury FC participated in addition to FC Edmonton, the Montreal Impact, Toronto FC and Vancouver Whitecaps FC. As winners, the Montreal Impact were awarded the Voyageurs Cup and became Canada's entry into the group stage of the 2014–15 CONCACAF Champions League. It was the seventh edition of the annual Canadian Championship.

== Bracket ==
The three Major League Soccer Canadian clubs were seeded according to their final position in 2013 league play. The fourth seed was allocated to the winner of the preliminary round between the participating NASL clubs.

All rounds of the competition were played via a two-leg home-and-away knock-out format. The higher seeded team had the option of deciding which leg they played at home. The team that scored the higher aggregate of goals in the two matches advanced. As in previous years, the team that won the final on aggregate, the Montreal Impact, was declared champion and earned the right to represent Canada in the 2014–15 CONCACAF Champions League.

Each round was a two-legged series with the away goals rule.

Preliminary round April 23–30
NASL	Ottawa Fury FC	0	2	2
NASL	FC Edmonton	3	0	3

Semi-finals; May 7–14
MLS	Toronto FC (p)	2	1	3 (5)
MLS	Vancouver Whitecaps FC	1	2	3 (3)
NASL	FC Edmonton	2	2	4
MLS	Montreal Impact	1	4	5

Final; May 28 – June 4
MLS	Toronto FC	1	0	1
MLS	Montreal Impact	1	1	2

== Preliminary round ==
=== Summary ===
Team 1	Agg.	Team 2	1st leg	2nd leg
Ottawa Fury FC	1–3	FC Edmonton	0–0	1–3

=== Matches ===
April 23
7:30 pm EDT

Ottawa Fury FC	0–0	FC Edmonton
	Report

Keith Harris Stadium, Ottawa, Ontario
Attendance: 2,411
Referee: Geoff Gamble
April 30
7:30 pm MDT

FC Edmonton	3–1	Ottawa Fury FC
Fordyce 30', 62'; Boakai 48'	Report	Dantas 90'

Clarke Stadium, Edmonton, Alberta
Attendance: 2,001
Referee: Drew Fischer

FC Edmonton won 3–1 on aggregate.

== Semi-finals ==
=== Summary ===
Team 1	Agg.	Team 2	1st leg	2nd leg
FC Edmonton	4–5	Montreal Impact	2–1	2–4
Toronto FC	3–3 (5–3 p)	Vancouver Whitecaps FC	2–1	1–2 (a.e.t.)

=== Matches ===
May 7
7:30 pm MDT

FC Edmonton	2–1	Montreal Impact
Ameobi 60'; Nonni 90'	Report	McInerney 56'

Clarke Stadium, Edmonton, Alberta
Attendance: 1,946
Referee: Silviu Petrescu
May 14
7:30 pm EDT

Montreal Impact	4–2	FC Edmonton
McInerney 10', 17'; Brovsky 47'; Bernier 90+7' (pen.)	Report	Jonke 67', 70' (pen.)

Saputo Stadium, Montreal, Quebec
Attendance: 12,826
Referee: Drew Fischer

Montreal Impact won 5–4 on aggregate.

May 7
7:30 pm EDT

Toronto FC	2–1	Vancouver Whitecaps FC
Defoe 28'; Bradley 89'	Report	Manneh 90'

BMO Field, Toronto, Ontario
Attendance: 22,591
Referee: Mathieu Bourdeau
May 14
7:30 pm PDT

Vancouver Whitecaps FC	2–1 (a.e.t.)	Toronto FC
Hurtado 43'; Morales 86' (pen.)	Report	Henry 4'
Penalties
Laba (penalty scored); Manneh (penalty missed); Fernandez (penalty scored); Teibert (penalty scored)	3–5	(penalty scored) Orr; (penalty scored) Moore; (penalty scored) De Rosario; (penalty scored) Bradley; (penalty scored) Nakajima-Farran

BC Place, Vancouver, British Columbia
Attendance: 18,470
Referee: David Gantar

3–3 on aggregate. Toronto FC won 5–3 on penalties.

== Final ==
=== Summary ===
Team 1	Agg.	Team 2	1st leg	2nd leg
Toronto FC	1–2	Montreal Impact	1–1	0–1

=== Matches ===
May 28
6:30 pm EDT

Toronto FC	1–1	Montreal Impact
Henry 20'	Report	Mapp 73'

BMO Field, Toronto, Ontario
Attendance: 18,269
Referee: Silviu Petrescu

Toronto FC	Montreal Impact

GK	12	Joe Bendik
DF	5	Ashtone Morgan
DF	15	Doneil Henry (c)
DF	17	Nick Hagglund
DF	13	Steven Caldwell
MF	16	Bradley Orr
MF	35	Daniel Lovitz
MF	25	Jeremy Hall
MF	23	Álvaro Rey	(yellow card) 35'	(substituted off) 79'
FW	14	Dwayne De Rosario
FW	9	Gilberto		(substituted off) 90'
Substitutes
FW	8	Kyle Bekker		(substituted on) 76'
FW	2	Justin Morrow		(substituted on) 79'
Manager
(New Zealand) Ryan Nelsen

GK	30	Evan Bush
DF	6	Hassoun Camara
DF	44	Heath Pearce
DF	34	Karl Ouimette
DF	2	Nelson Rivas		(substituted off) 3'
MF	15	Andrés Romero
MF	7	Felipe		(substituted off) 45'
MF	23	Hernán Bernardello
MF	21	Justin Mapp
MF	8	Patrice Bernier (c)		(substituted off) 81'
FW	9	Marco Di Vaio
Substitutes
DF	55	Wandrille Lefèvre	(yellow card) 83'	(substituted on) 3'
FW	99	Jack McInerney		(substituted on) 45'
MF	16	Calum Mallace		(substituted on) 81'
Manager
(United States) Frank Klopas

Assistant referees
Gianni Facchini
Lyes Arfa
Fourth official
Yusri Rudolf

June 4
6:30 pm EDT

Montreal Impact	1–0	Toronto FC
Felipe 90+1'	Report

Saputo Stadium, Montreal, Quebec
Attendance: 13,423
Referee: David Gantar

Montreal Impact	Toronto FC

GK	30	(United States) Evan Bush
RB	6	(France) Hassoun Camara
CB	44	(United States) Heath Pearce
CB	34	(Canada) Karl Ouimette
LB	55	(France) Wandrille Lefevre
MF	15	(Argentina) Andrés Romero		(substituted off) 88'
MF	23	(Argentina) Hernán Bernardello	(yellow card) 4'
MF	21	(United States) Justin Mapp		(substituted off) 60'
MF	8	(Canada) Patrice Bernier (c)
FW	99	(United States) Jack McInerney		(substituted off) 75'
FW	9	(Italy) Marco Di Vaio
Substitutes:
GK	1	(United States) Troy Perkins
DF	26	(Spain) Adrián López
DF	13	(Italy) Matteo Ferrari
DF	17	(Canada) Maxim Tissot		(substituted on) 88'
MF	51	(Scotland) Calum Mallace		(substituted on) 75'
MF	16	(Brazil) Felipe	(yellow card) 90+2'	(substituted on) 60'
FW	7	(Uruguay) Santiago González
Manager:
(United States) Frank Klopas

GK	12	(United States) Joe Bendik
DF	15	(Canada) Doneil Henry
DF	2	(United States) Justin Morrow
DF	28	(United States) Mark Bloom
DF	13	(Scotland) Steven Caldwell (c)
MF	35	(United States) Daniel Lovitz	(substituted off) 55'
MF	25	(United States) Jeremy Hall	(substituted off) 67'
MF	8	(Canada) Kyle Bekker
MF	23	(Spain) Álvaro Rey	(substituted off) 74'
FW	18	(England) Jermain Defoe
FW	27	(England) Luke Moore
Substitutes:
GK	1	(United States) Chris Konopka
DF	5	(Canada) Ashtone Morgan
MF	17	(United States) Nick Hagglund
MF	14	(Canada) Dwayne De Rosario	(substituted on) 74'
MF	21	(Canada) Jonathan Osorio	(substituted on) 67'
FW	32	(United States) Andrew Wiedeman
FW	9	(Brazil) Gilberto	(substituted on) 55'
Manager:
(New Zealand) Ryan Nelsen

Assistant referees:
Oscar Mitchell-Carvalho
Richard Gamache
Fourth official:
Justin Tasev

Match rules

- Home and away 90 minutes match.
- 30 minutes of extra time if necessary.
- Penalty shoot-out if scores still level.
- Maximum of three substitutions.

Montreal Impact won 2–1 on aggregate.

== Goalscorers ==
Rank	Player	Team	Goals
1	(United States) Jack McInerney	Montreal Impact	3
2	(Northern Ireland) Daryl Fordyce	FC Edmonton	2
2	(Canada) Doneil Henry	Toronto FC	2
2	(Canada) Frank Jonke	FC Edmonton	2
5	(England) Tomi Ameobi	FC Edmonton	1
5	(Canada) Hanson Boakai	FC Edmonton	1
5	(Canada) Patrice Bernier	Montreal Impact	1
5	(United States) Michael Bradley	Toronto FC	1
5	(United States) Jeb Brovsky	Montreal Impact	1
5	(Brazil) Vini Dantas	Ottawa Fury FC	1
5	(England) Jermain Defoe	Toronto FC	1
5	(Brazil) Felipe	Montreal Impact	1
5	(United States) Erik Hurtado	Vancouver Whitecaps FC	1
5	(The Gambia) Kekuta Manneh	Vancouver Whitecaps FC	1
5	(United States) Justin Mapp	Montreal Impact	1
5	(Chile) Pedro Morales	Vancouver Whitecaps FC	1
5	(Canada) Michael Nonni	FC Edmonton	1
