= Maximiliano Rodríguez (footballer, born 1994) =

Argentine footballer

Personal information
- Full name: Maximiliano Leonel Rodríguez
- Date of birth: 1 April 1994 (age 32)
- Place of birth: Buenos Aires, Argentina
- Height: 5 ft 10 in (1.78 m)
- Position: Attacking midfielder

Youth career
- 2007–2009: Atlético Madrid
- 2009–2011: Argentinos Juniors

Senior career*
| Years | Team | Apps | (Gls) |
| 2011–2014 | Argentinos Juniors | 8 | (0) |
| 2013 | → Montreal Impact (loan) | 0 | (0) |
| 2014 | Bella Vista | | |
- * Club domestic league appearances and goals as of 7 June 2020

Maximiliano Leonel Rodríguez (born 1 April 1994) is an Argentine footballer who plays as an attacking midfielder.

== Club career ==
=== Youth career ===
Maximiliano Rodríguez was part of the youth program at Atlético Madrid from 2007 to 2009. He then returned to his native Argentina and was part of the youth squad of Argentinos Juniors from 2009 to 2011.

=== Professional career ===
In 2011, Maximiliano Rodríguez was promoted to the senior squad of Argentinos Juniors. Between 2011 and 2013, Rodríguez made 8 appearances for the club. On 13 April 2013 it was announced that Rodríguez was signed on loan by the Montreal Impact of Major League Soccer for the 2013 Major League Soccer season. The loan included an option for a permanent transfer. Nick De Santis, sporting director of the Impact, said, "He's got a good physique, he's explosive, he's intelligent enough to know how to work both halves of the field, but mostly he's got this great vision."

== Honors ==
=== Montreal Impact ===
- Canadian Championship: 2013
