= Andrés Romero (Argentine footballer) =

Argentine footballer

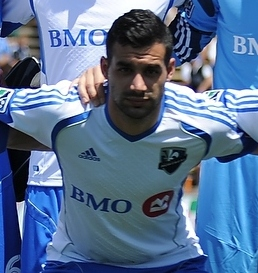
- Romero in 2013 with Montréal

Personal information
- Full name: Andrés Fabricio Romero
- Date of birth: 21 December 1989 (age 36)
- Place of birth: Bell Ville, Argentina
- Height: 1.76 m (5 ft 9 in)
- Positions: Forward; winger

Youth career
- Argentinos Juniors

Senior career*
Years	Team	Apps	(Gls)
2008–2011	Argentinos Juniors	47	(4)
2012–2014	Tombense	0	(0)
2012	→ Criciúma (loan)	9	(0)
2012	→ Náutico (loan)	6	(0)
2013–2014	→ Montreal Impact (loan)	59	(8)
2015–2017	Montreal Impact	36	(4)
2018	San Martín de San Juan	0	(0)

International career^{‡}
2009–2010	Argentina U20	5	(0)
- * Club domestic league appearances and goals as of 16 November 2017 ‡ National team caps and goals as of 1 August 2014

Andrés Fabricio Romero (born 21 December 1989) is a retired Argentine football striker.

== Career ==
=== Club ===
Romero made his first team debut in a 2–0 away defeat to Newell's Old Boys on 11 April 2008. In his second season with the club he scored his first goals for the club including 2 goals in a 5–0 win over Estudiantes de La Plata. Romero's playing time at Argentinos started to diminish since the appointment of Claudio Borghi as manager in June 2009. He was still part of the Argentinos Juniors squad that won the Clausura 2010 championship, although he only played in 2 of the club's 19 games during their championship winning campaign.

In 2012, Romero joined Brazilian club Criciúma and played at the club briefly before joining Náutico. In 2013, he joined his third Brazilian club Tombense. He was sent on loan to Montreal Impact in Major League Soccer for the 2013 season. In his first season with Montreal, Romero made 30 league appearances and scored 2 goals. He also helped the Canadian club win the 2013 Canadian Championship, scoring 1 goal in 4 matches.

On 5 January 2014, the Montreal Impact officially purchased Romero from Tombense. He departed the Impact following the 2017 season.

=== International ===
In January 2009 Romero was selected to join the Argentina under-20 squad for the 2009 South American Youth Championship in Venezuela, and featured in most of the games as a late substitute. Romero did start the final two matches, a tie versus Venezuela and a loss to Colombia.

== Honours ==
Argentinos Juniors

- Argentine Primera División (1): Clausura 2010

Montreal Impact

- Canadian Championship (2): 2013, 2014
