= Patrice Bernier =

Canadian soccer player (born 1979)

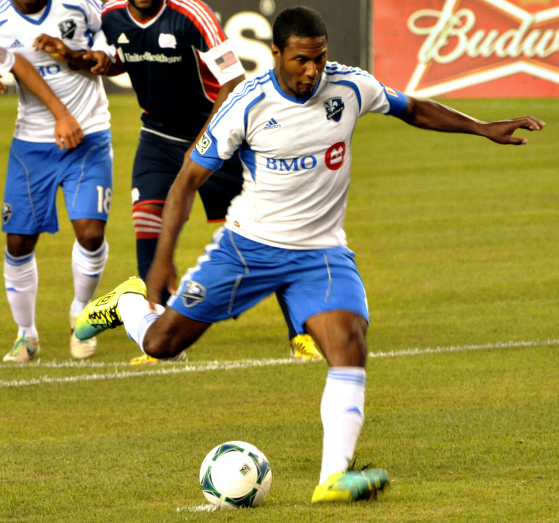
- Bernier taking a penalty for the Montreal Impact in 2013

Personal information
- Date of birth: September 23, 1979 (age 47)
- Place of birth: Brossard, Quebec, Canada
- Position: Midfielder

College career
Years	Team	Apps	(Gls)
1998–1999	Syracuse Orange	38	(12)

Senior career*
Years	Team	Apps	(Gls)
2000–2002	Montreal Impact	73	(5)
2003–2004	Moss FK	40	(1)
2004–2007	Tromsø IL	68	(4)
2007–2008	1. FC Kaiserslautern	15	(1)
2008–2011	FC Nordsjælland	76	(3)
2011	Lyngby BK	12	(2)
2012–2017	Montreal Impact	152	(15)
Total		436	(31)

International career^{‡}
1994–1995	Canada U17	9	(1)
1998	Canada U20	3	(1)
1999–2001	Canada U23	13	(0)
2004–2017	Canada	56	(2)

Managerial career
- 2018–2019: Montreal Impact Academy (assistant)
- 2019–2020: Montreal Impact (assistant)
- * Club domestic league appearances and goals as of October 22, 2017 ‡ National team caps and goals as of July 15, 2017

Patrice Bernier (born September 23, 1979) is a Canadian retired professional soccer player. A long-time mainstay of the Canada national team, the midfielder played the majority of his career with Montreal Impact in addition to playing in Denmark, Germany, and Norway.

== Club career ==
In 1998-99, Bernier played college soccer for Syracuse University in the United States. At Syracuse, Bernier played 38 matches and recorded 34 points with 12 goals and 10 assists. He was named to the Big East All-Rookie Team in his freshman year and the All-Big East First Team in his sophomore year.

Bernier played for the original Montreal Impact in the A-league in Canada in 2000. He joined Norwegian side Moss F.K. to play alongside compatriot Rob Friend at the start of the 2003 season. He has some background in hockey, but he was told he was too short to reach the top level.

=== Tromsø ===
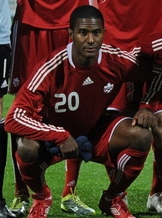
Bernier with Canada in 2010

Bernier signed for Tromsø IL in the summer of 2004. He was picked up from the Norwegian 1st division team Moss F.K. for less than 500,000 NOK (approx. €63,000 or US$75,000. He delivered the best stamina test results in the history of Tromsø, surpassing even former Tromsø player Morten Gamst Pedersen. After an autumn season and a spring for Tromsø, they refused an offer of 10 million NOK (approx. €1.3 million) for him from the Turkish club Beşiktaş.

Bernier started the 2007 season as one of the Tippeliga's best players, scoring two fantastic goals against Norway's best soccer club over the last 20 years, Rosenborg BK. Although Rosenborg went on to win the game with an injury-time goal by Alexander Tettey, Bernier was awarded the "Man of the Match"-prize. Tromsø immediately offered Bernier a new contract; however, he rejected it as he wanted to leave Norway for a better league. Tromsø then put forth an even better deal, but Bernier was determined to leave Tippeligaen.

=== Kaiserslautern ===
On May 28, 2007, Bernier left Tromsø for the German 2. Bundesliga club 1. FC Kaiserslautern, where former Vålerenga I.F. Fotball Kjetil Rekdal was the trainer.

=== Nordsjælland ===
On June 25, 2008, Bernier signed a contract with Danish club FC Nordsjælland. On August 14, 2008, he scored the winning goal in the first leg of a UEFA Cup second qualifying round match versus Scottish club, Queen of the South of Dumfries. Bernier scored the winning goal and his first goal of the 2010 season on November 14 in a 2–1 home win over Lyngby. He ended his season early in May against Copenhagen, following an early substitution it was revealed that he suffered a fracture in his fibula. He played over 90 games in all competitions combined with FC Nordsjaelland from the summer of 2008 until the summer of 2011, winning the Danish Cup in 2010 and 2011. He was voted Player of the Year in 2010 by the supporters of FC Nordsjaelland.

=== Lyngby Boldklub ===
On August 24, 2011, Bernier signed a one-year contract with Lyngby Boldklub. He made his debut against his former club, in a 4–0 loss to FCN. On October 16, Bernier scored his first goal for the club in a 3–2 loss to Silkeborg IF.

=== Montreal Impact ===
On December 19, 2011, Bernier signed a contract to join Montreal Impact upon their entry into Major League Soccer in 2012. He remained under contract with Lyngby Boldklub while they finished their season. However, he had an out clause that allowed him to leave without a transfer fee to the Impact. Bernier scored his first goal for Montreal in a 2–0 away victory against Sporting Kansas City on May 5, 2012. He was named MLS Player of the Week for Week 13–15 in the 2012 MLS. He was also named MLS Player of the Month for the month of August 2012.

Under his captaincy, the Impact reached the CONCACAF Champions League final in 2015 and the MLS Eastern Conference final losing to Toronto FC in 2016. At age 38, he played the final match of his career on October 22, 2017 against the New England Revolution.

== International career ==
Bernier played at the 1995 FIFA U-17 World Championship in Ecuador, alongside Brad Parker. They are the only ones of that squad to make it to the senior team.

He made his senior debut for Canada in a November 2003 friendly match against the Czech Republic. By December 2009, he earned a total of 43 caps, scoring two goals. He reached 50 caps in a friendly against Jamaica on September 9, 2014.

After a two-year absence, Bernier returned to the national team under Octavio Zambrano for a friendly against Curaçao on June 13, 2017. The next month he captained Canada at the 2017 CONCACAF Gold Cup, retiring from the national team after Canada's elimination in the quarter-finals to Jamaica.

== Personal life ==
Bernier was born in Brossard, Quebec, in a Haitian family to Jean and Gladys Bernier. After watching the 1986 FIFA World Cup in Mexico (the only World Cup that Canada had appeared in until 2022), he was drawn to the sport. His family signed him up for soccer as it was the most popular sport in Haiti. He began his club career at L'Association de Soccer de Brossard (AS Brossard), with his father as his first coach.

== Coaching career ==
In 2018, a few weeks after his retirement, it was announced that Bernier was named as a U13, U15, U17, and U19 assistant coach at the Montreal Impact Academy. In 2019, he became an assistant coach with the first team under Thierry Henry. In February 2021, he announced he was leaving his role with the first team to take a broadcasting position, but will remain with the club's academy as post-training supervisor, particularly with the Under-23 team.

== Broadcasting career ==
In February 2021, Bernier announced he would quit his coaching position at CF Montreal to become an analyst for TVA Sports.

== Career statistics ==
=== International ===
Appearances and goals by national team and year
National team	Year	Apps	Goals
Canada	2003	2	0
Canada	2004	4	0
Canada	2005	8	0
Canada	2006	5	0
Canada	2007	9	0
Canada	2008	9	0
Canada	2009	6	2
Canada	2010	2	0
Canada	2011	1	0
Canada	2012	3	0
Canada	2014	2	0
Canada	2015	2	0
Canada	2017	3	0
Total		56	2

Scores and results list Canada's goal tally first, score column indicates score after each Bernier goal.

List of international goals scored by Patrice Bernier
No.	Date	Venue	Opponent	Score	Result	Competition	Ref.
1	30 June 2009	Oxnard College Soccer Field, Oxnard, United States	Guatemala	2–0	3–0	Friendly	
2	10 July 2009	FIU Stadium, Miami, United States	Costa Rica	1–1	2–2	2009 CONCACAF Gold Cup	

== Hockey career ==
Bernier was also placed in hockey at the age of six. He played two seasons in the major-junior Quebec Major Junior Hockey League (QMJHL) as a defender. He spent parts of those seasons with the Val-d'Or Foreurs where he would be teammates with future National Hockey League players Steve Bégin and Roberto Luongo, and the Sherbrooke Castors.

In his first season in 1996-97, Bernier's Val-d'Or Foreurs took part in the QMJHL playoffs and made it through the second round before being eliminated in the division final by the Hull Olympiques, the eventual playoff winners. He began the following season with Val-d'Or, but roughly 40 games later joined the Sherbrooke Castors who failed to qualify for the playoffs. Bernier decided to end his hockey career following discussions with an agent who told him that he lacked interest from any National Hockey League teams. In 143 games, he amassed 17 goals and 73 points.

== Honours ==
=== Club ===
FC Nordsjælland

- Danish Cup: 2009–10, 2010–11

Montreal Impact

- Canadian Championship: 2013, 2014

Individual

- Quebec Soccer Hall of Fame: 2017
- Canada Soccer Hall of Fame: 2022
