= Justin Mapp =

American soccer player

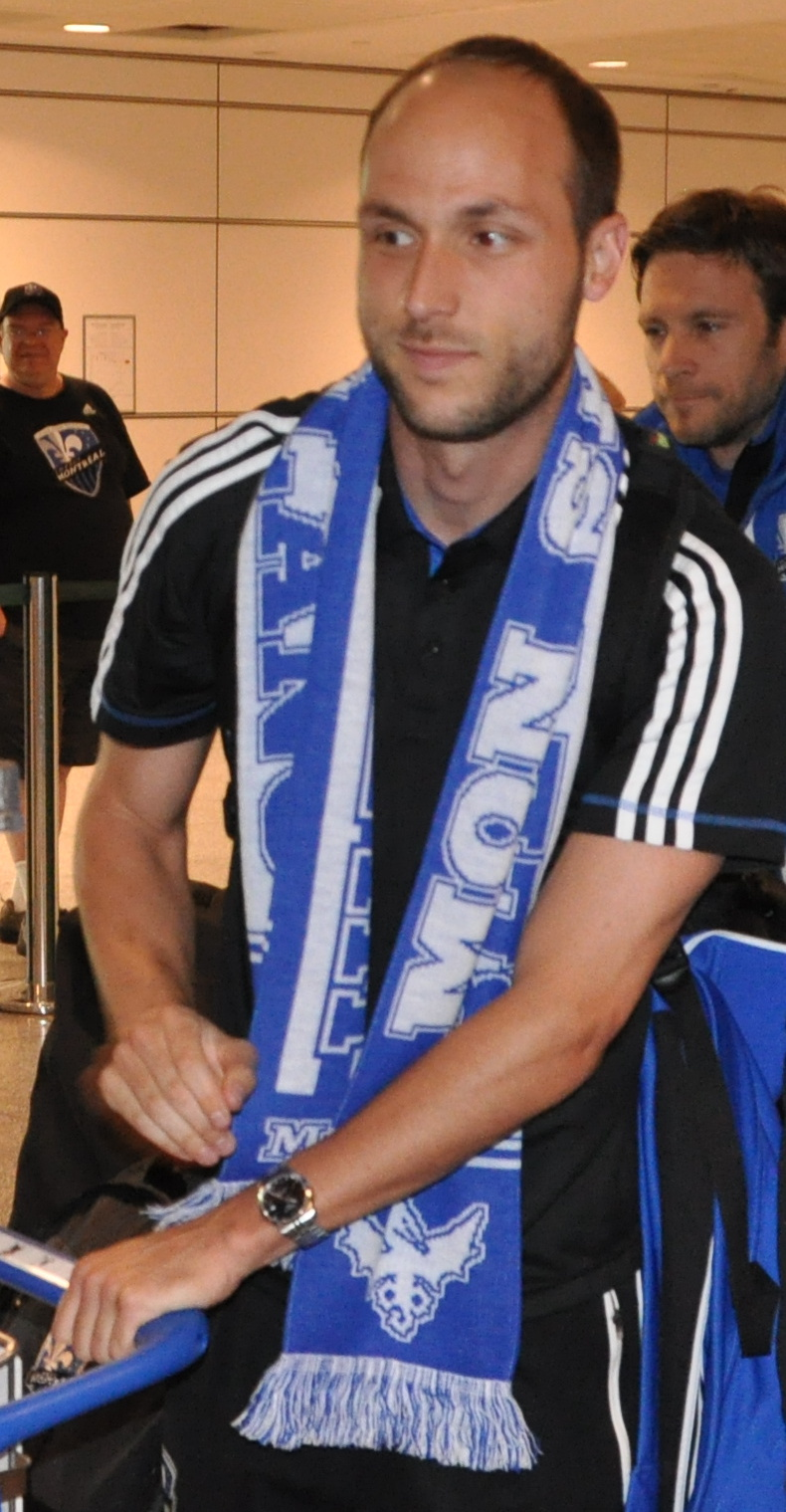

Personal information
- Full name: Justin Mapp
- Date of birth: October 18, 1984 (age 42)
- Place of birth: Brandon, Mississippi, United States
- Height: 5 ft 11 in (1.80 m)
- Position: Left winger

Youth career
- 2000–2001: IMG Soccer Academy

Senior career*
Years	Team	Apps	(Gls)
2002	D.C. United	3	(0)
2003–2010	Chicago Fire	174	(14)
2010–2011	Philadelphia Union	44	(4)
2012–2015	Montreal Impact	82	(4)
2016	Sporting Kansas City	6	(0)
Total		309	(22)

International career^{‡}
2001	United States U17	3	(0)
2003	United States U20	5	(1)
2005–2007	United States	8	(0)
Medal record
Representing United States
Winner	CONCACAF Gold Cup	2007
Men's Soccer
- * Club domestic league appearances and goals as of November 14, 2016 ‡ National team caps and goals as of March 31, 2010

Justin Mapp (born October 18, 1984) is an American former soccer player who played as a midfielder. Mapp has been described as being versatile and known for possessing "speed and creative abilities from out wide, but also his ability to drift inside and generate offense."

== Career ==
=== Professional ===
Mapp graduated from the Bradenton Academy in 2001 and signed with MLS as a Project-40 player. He was drafted by D.C. United with the fourth overall pick in the 2002 MLS SuperDraft, but played only 28 minutes for DC in his first year as a pro. The Chicago Fire acquired Mapp for Dema Kovalenko before the 2003 season, and he has been an important player in the squad since, helping them to the 2003 US Open Cup. In two seasons with the Fire, Mapp scored six goals and added seven assists.

After eight years with Chicago, Mapp was traded to Philadelphia Union on July 26, 2010, in exchange for allocation money. Mapp won "MLS Player of the Week" honors in Week 11 of the 2011 season for his 2-goal performance in the club's 6–2 win against Toronto FC. This performance earned the recognition of the North American Soccer Reporters society. One of his goals was even nominated for the MLS Goal of the Week award. On June 8, Mapp was named a nominee for the MLS All-Star Game. On June 28, he was said to be leading in text voting for the All-Star Game.

After a season and a half with Philadelphia, Mapp was selected by expansion franchise Montreal Impact in the 2011 MLS Expansion Draft on November 23, 2011. He said he was surprised to be unprotected by the Union. On May 29, 2013, Mapp was awarded the 2013 George Gross Memorial Trophy for his play in the Canadian Championship, leading Montreal to victory over Vancouver Whitecaps FC in the final. A year later, he claimed the award again after Montreal defeated Toronto FC in the 2014 final making him one of only two players, the other being Dwayne De Rosario, to win the award twice.

After his contract expired following the 2015 season, Mapp signed with Sporting Kansas City, becoming the first free agent signing in MLS history. He played six times for Kansas before retiring at the end of 2017.

=== International ===
Mapp has played for various youth United States national teams, including the 2001 Under-17 World Championship in Trinidad and Tobago. He started all five matches for the U.S. in the 2003 World Youth Championship in the United Arab Emirates. Mapp made his debut for the senior team on October 12, 2005, against Panama. Mapp also came on as a sub January 20, 2007, against Denmark, running 70 yards with the ball before setting up Jonathan Bornstein's game-winning goal. He also played for USA in Copa América 2007.

== Career statistics ==
=== Club ===
As of December 14, 2015.

Club performance			League		Cup		League Cup		Continental		Total	
Season	Club	League	Apps	Goals	Apps	Goals	Apps	Goals	Apps	Goals	Apps	Goals
USA			League		Open Cup		MLS Cup		North America		Total	
2002	D.C. United	Major League Soccer	3	0	0	0	0	0	0	0	3	0
2003	Chicago Fire	Major League Soccer	21	3	1	0	3	0	–		25	3
2004	Chicago Fire	Major League Soccer	24	3	4	0	0	0	4	1	32	4
2005	Chicago Fire	Major League Soccer	29	3	3	0	1	0	–		33	3
2006	Chicago Fire	Major League Soccer	26	2	2	1	2	1	–		30	4
2007	Chicago Fire	Major League Soccer	13	0	1	0	1	0	–		15	0
2008	Chicago Fire	Major League Soccer	30	2	2	0	3	0	–		35	2
2009	Chicago Fire	Major League Soccer	21	1	1	0	2	0	–		24	1
2010	Chicago Fire	Major League Soccer	10	0	–		–		–		10	0
2010	Philadelphia Union	Major League Soccer	15	1	0	0	–		–		15	1
2011	Philadelphia Union	Major League Soccer	29	3	0	0	2	0	–		31	3
Canada			League		Voyageurs Cup		MLS Cup		North America		Total	
2012	Montreal Impact	Major League Soccer	27	2	2	0	–		–		29	2
2013	Montreal Impact	Major League Soccer	27	2	4	1	1	0	–		34	3
2014	Montreal Impact	Major League Soccer	23	0	3	1	–		3	0	29	1
2015	Montreal Impact	Major League Soccer	5	0	2	0	0	0	3	0	10	0
Total	USA		221	18	14	1	14	1	4	1	253	21
Total	Canada		69	4	9	2	1	0	3	0	79	6
Career total			290	22	23	3	15	1	8	1	332	27

=== International ===
As of September 21, 2014.

United States
Year	Apps	Goals
2005	1	0
2006	0	0
2007	7	0
2008	0	0
Total	8	0

== Honors ==
=== United States ===
- CONCACAF Gold Cup: 2007

=== Chicago Fire ===
- MLS Supporters' Shield: 2003
- U.S. Open Cup (2): 2003, 2006

=== Montreal Impact ===
- Canadian Championship (2): 2013, 2014
- Walt Disney World Pro Soccer Classic: 2013

=== Individual ===
- MLS Best XI: 2006
- George Gross Memorial Trophy (2): 2013, 2014

== Personal life ==
Mapp had a child named Jackson Sanders Mapp on March 24, 2016.
