= Collen Warner =

American soccer player

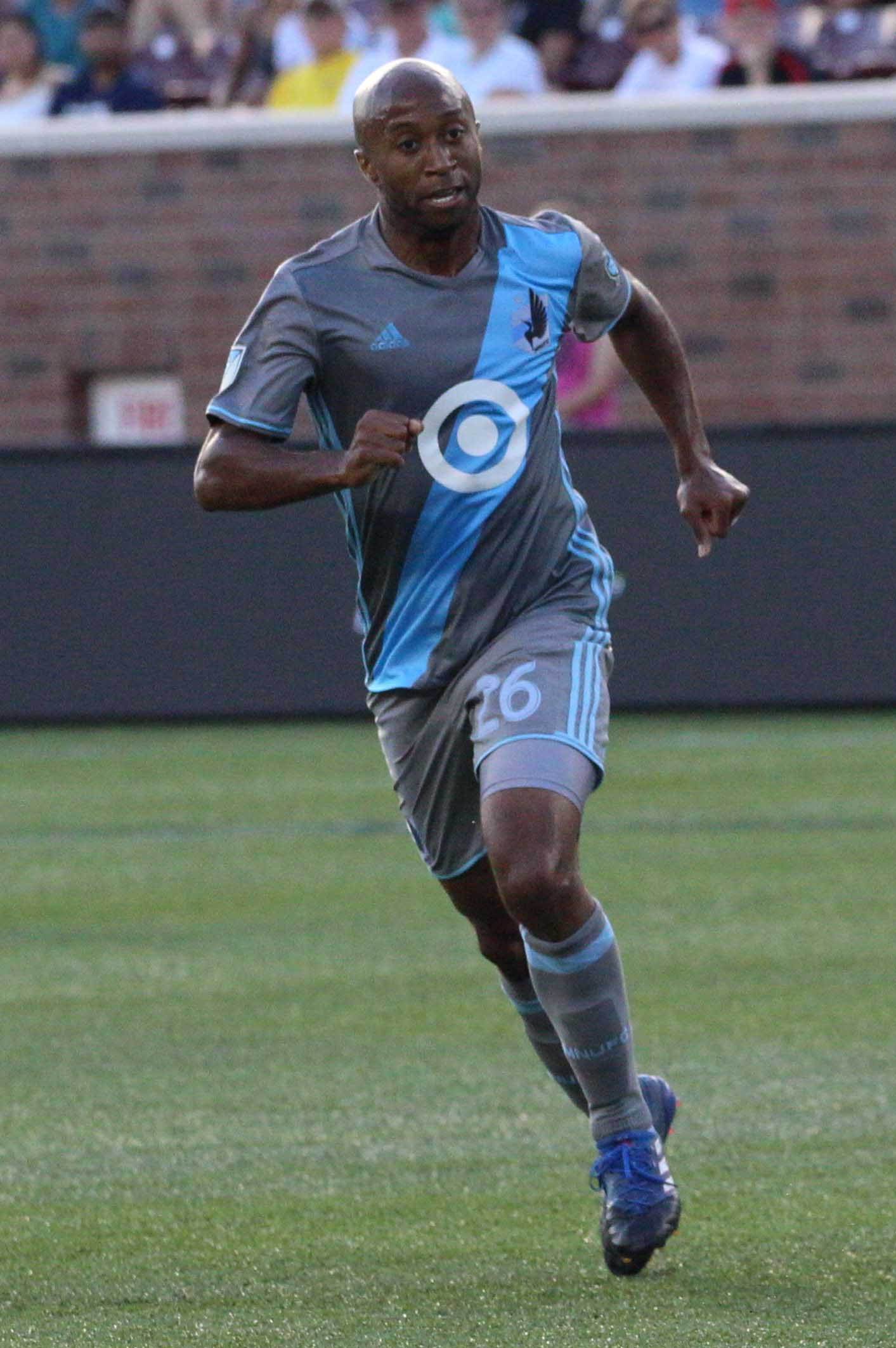
- Warner with Minnesota United in 2017

Personal information
- Full name: Collen Warner
- Date of birth: June 24, 1988 (age 38)
- Place of birth: Denver, Colorado, United States
- Height: 5 ft 10 in (1.78 m)
- Position: Midfielder

Youth career
- 2006–2009: Portland Pilots

Senior career*
Years	Team	Apps	(Gls)
2007–2008	Colorado Rapids U-23	18	(2)
2009	Portland Timbers U23s	6	(2)
2010–2011	Real Salt Lake	37	(0)
2010	→ AC St. Louis (loan)	1	(0)
2012–2014	Montreal Impact	55	(1)
2014–2015	Toronto FC	44	(2)
2016	Houston Dynamo	24	(0)
2016	→ Rio Grande Valley FC Toros (loan)	2	(0)
2017–2018	Minnesota United	42	(1)
2019	FC Helsingør	5	(1)
2020–2022	Colorado Rapids	41	(2)
2022	Colorado Rapids 2	3	(2)
- * Club domestic league appearances and goals as of October 15, 2022

Collen Warner (born June 24, 1988) is an American professional soccer player who plays as a midfielder. He last played for Major League Soccer club Colorado Rapids.

== College and amateur ==
Warner attended Denver East High School, played club soccer for Colorado Rush, and spent time training with English Premier League players and coaches at the Liverpool Youth Academy in 2002, before playing four years of college soccer at the University of Portland. He was named to the All-West Coast Conference Freshman Team and received an All-WCC Honorable Mention as a rookie in 2006, was named to the All-WCC First Team and to Top Drawer Soccer's All-Season Third Team in 2007, and was named to the All-WCC First Team for the second consecutive year in 2008, when he led the Pilots with eight assists and was second on the team with five goals.

During his college years Warner also played for both Colorado Rapids U-23 and Portland Timbers U23s in the USL Premier Development League.

== Club career ==
=== Real Salt Lake ===
Warner was drafted in the first round (15th overall) of the 2010 MLS SuperDraft by Real Salt Lake. He made his professional debut on April 17, 2010, in a game against Los Angeles Galaxy. Warner went on a short-term loan to USSF Division 2 club AC St Louis on July 28, 2010.

=== Montreal Impact ===
Warner was left exposed by Real Salt Lake in the 2011 MLS Expansion Draft and was selected by expansion side Montreal Impact.

=== Toronto FC ===
Warner was traded to Toronto FC for Issey Nakajima-Farran on May 16, 2014.

=== Houston Dynamo ===
Warner was traded to Houston Dynamo for a second-round draft pick on March 2, 2016.

=== Minnesota United FC ===
On December 13, 2016, Minnesota United FC drafted Warner in the second round of the 2016 MLS Expansion draft.

Warner was released by Minnesota at the end of their 2018 season.

=== FC Helsingør ===
On 17 April 2019, FC Helsingør announced the signing of Warner on a free transfer. The deal ran out to the end of the season.

=== Colorado Rapids ===
On June 30, 2020, Warner signed a one-year deal with his hometown team Colorado Rapids.

== Career statistics ==
As of match played 2 August 2022

Club	Season	League			Cup (Note: Includes Lamar Hunt U.S. Open Cup and Canadian Championship matches.)		MLS Playoffs		Continental		Total	
Club	Season	Division	Apps	Goals	Apps	Goals	Apps	Goals	Apps	Goals	Apps	Goals
Real Salt Lake	2010	MLS	13	0	0	0	1	0	3	1	17	1
Real Salt Lake	2011	MLS	24	0	2	0	0	0	0	0	26	0
Real Salt Lake	Total		37	0	2	0	1	0	3	1	43	1
AC St. Louis (loan)	2010	USSF D2	1	0	—	—	—	—	—	—	1	0
Montreal Impact	2012	MLS	29	0	2	0	0	0	0	0	31	0
Montreal Impact	2013	MLS	17	1	4	0	1	0	3	0	25	1
Montreal Impact	2014	MLS	9	0	1	0	0	0	0	0	10	0
Montreal Impact	Total		55	1	7	0	1	0	3	0	66	1
Toronto	2014	MLS	20	0	0	0	0	0	0	0	20	0
Toronto	2015	MLS	29	2	2	0	0	0	0	0	31	2
Toronto	Total		49	2	2	0	0	0	0	0	51	2
Houston Dynamo	2016	MLS	24	0	2	0	0	0	0	0	26	0
Minnesota United FC	2017	MLS	25	1	1	0	0	0	0	0	26	1
Minnesota United FC	2018	MLS	17	0	2	0	0	0	0	0	19	0
Minnesota United FC	Total		42	1	3	0	0	0	0	0	45	1
FC Helsingør	2019–20	2nd Division	5	1	0	0	—		0	0	5	1
Colorado Rapids	2020	MLS	7	0	—		0	0	—		7	0
Colorado Rapids	2021	MLS	16	1	—		0	0	—		16	1
Colorado Rapids	2022	MLS	18	1	1	0	0	0	1	0	20	1
Colorado Rapids	Total		41	2	1	0	0	0	1	0	43	2
Career total			254	7	17	0	2	0	7	1	280	8

== Honors ==
Montreal Impact

- Canadian Championship: 2013
