= Jeb Brovsky =

American soccer player

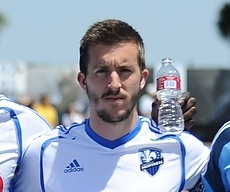
- Brovsky in 2013 with Montréal

Personal information
- Full name: John Eli Brovsky
- Date of birth: December 3, 1988 (age 37)
- Place of birth: Lakewood, Colorado, U.S.
- Height: 6 ft 1 in (1.85 m)
- Position: Defender

Youth career
- 2003–2007: Colorado Rush

College career
Years	Team	Apps	(Gls)
2007–2010	Notre Dame Fighting Irish		

Senior career*
Years	Team	Apps	(Gls)
2007–2008	Colorado Rapids U-23	4	(0)
2011	Vancouver Whitecaps FC	24	(0)
2012–2014	Montreal Impact	65	(2)
2014–2015	New York City FC	15	(0)
2014	→ Strømsgodset (loan)	5	(0)
2016	Minnesota United FC	24	(0)
- * Club domestic league appearances and goals as of October 23, 2016

John Eli "Jeb" Brovsky (born December 3, 1988) is an American former soccer player.

== Career ==
=== College and amateur ===
Brovsky played youth soccer for Colorado Rush with whom he won many state and national titles. He went to Green Mountain High School where he played both soccer and football as well as basketball. Brovsky then played for the Notre Dame Fighting Irish for four years and was one of the top players in the Big East Conference.

=== Professional ===
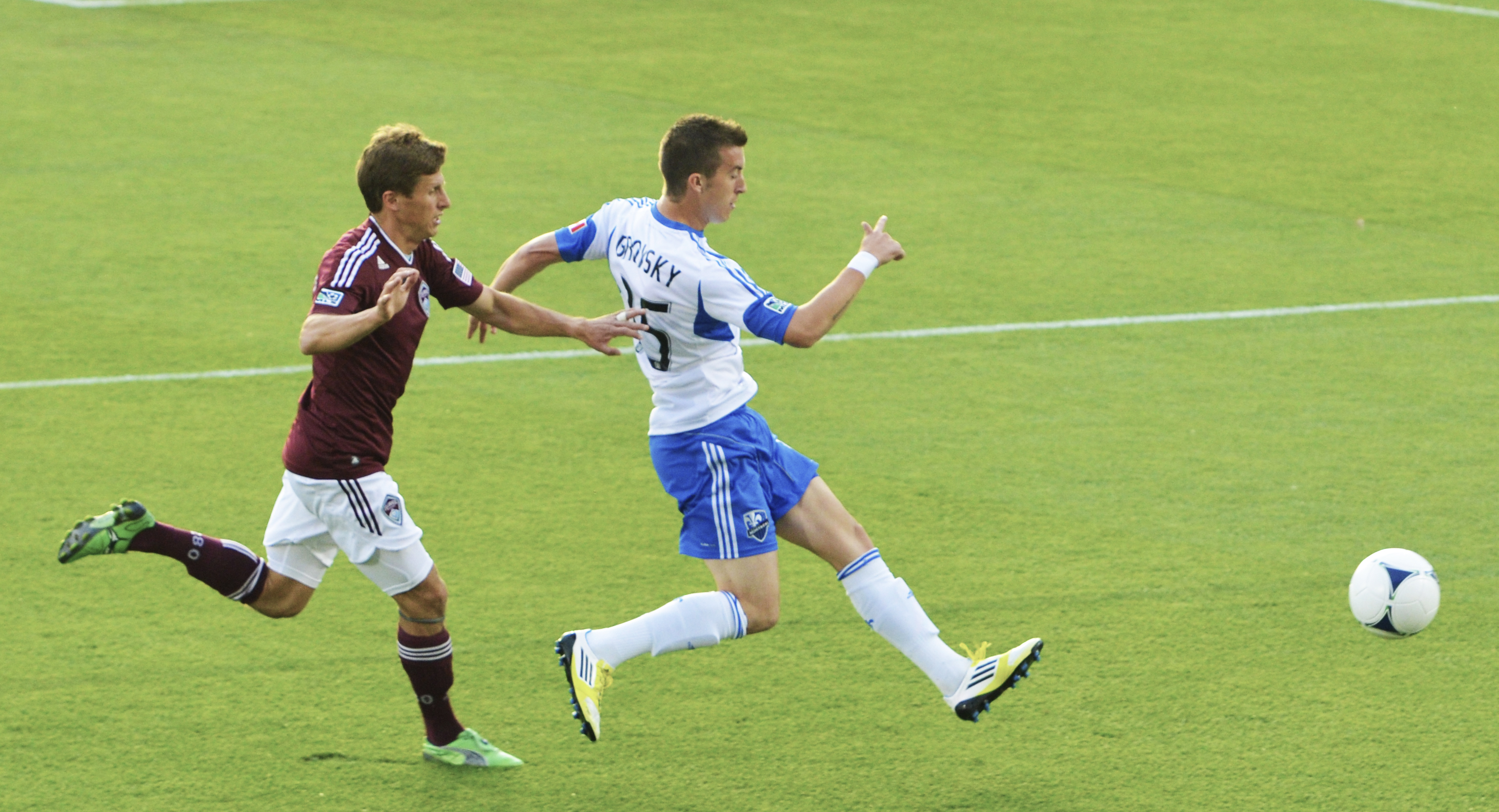
Jeb Brovsky of the Montreal Impact defends against Colorado Rapids midfielder Jamie Smith (May 26, 2012, Denver, Colorado)

Brovsky was drafted first in the second round (19th overall) in the 2011 MLS SuperDraft by Vancouver Whitecaps FC. He signed with Vancouver on March 15, 2011, and made his professional debut on April 10, 2011, in a game against Houston Dynamo.

Brovsky was left exposed by Vancouver in the 2011 MLS Expansion Draft and was selected by expansion side Montreal Impact.

On June 12, 2014 New York City FC, who did not begin play until the 2015 MLS season, traded a second-round 2016 MLS SuperDraft pick to Montreal for Brovsky, making him their second signing. Four weeks later, the New York club sent him on loan to Strømsgodset in Norway, an affiliate of NYCFC's sister club Manchester City, in order to keep him match fit for the start of the 2015 Major League Soccer season. On July 26, he got his Tippeligaen debut, when he came on as a substitute in the 76th minute in the match against Sandnes Ulf.

After his release from New York City FC, Brovsky was placed in the 2015 MLS Re-Entry Draft. Brovsky later signed for Minnesota United FC in the North American Soccer League.

=== Career statistics ===
As of November 23, 2015

Club	Season	League	League			Cup			Continental			Playoffs			Total		
Club	Season	League	Apps	Goals	Assists	Apps	Goals	Assists	Apps	Goals	Assists	Apps	Goals	Assists	Apps	Goals	Assists
Vancouver Whitecaps FC	2011	MLS	24	0	1	1	0	0	–			–			25	0	1
Vancouver Whitecaps FC	Total		24	0	1	1	0	0	–			–			25	0	1
Montreal Impact	2012	MLS	28	0	1	2	0	0	–			–			30	0	1
Montreal Impact	2013	MLS	30	2	2	4	0	0	3	0	0	1	0	0	38	2	2
Montreal Impact	2014	MLS	7	0	0	–			–			–			7	0	0
Montreal Impact	Total		65	2	3	6	0	0	3	0	0	1	0	0	75	2	3
Strømsgodset	2014	Tippeligaen	3	0	0	0	0	0	0	0	0	–			3	0	0
New York City FC	2015	MLS	15	0	0	1	0	0	0	0	0	0	0	0	16	0	0

== Personal life ==
Brovsky founded his nonprofit Peace Pandemic in 2010 while at the University of Notre Dame. Peace Pandemic aims to end violence against women and empower boys and girls worldwide through soccer. Brovsky travels with his wife and they have held camps in India and Guatemala.

Brovsky has been an official ambassador of the Homeless World Cup movement since 2014.

== Honors ==
=== Montreal Impact ===
- Canadian Championship: 2013, 2014
