= 2013 Canadian Championship =

2013 professional soccer tournament

2013 Amway Canadian Championship (in English) Championnat Canadien Amway 2013 (in French)

Tournament details
- Country: Canada
- Dates: April 24 – May 29
- Teams: 4 (from 2 leagues)

Final positions
- Champions: Montreal Impact (1st title)
- Runners-up: Vancouver Whitecaps FC

Tournament statistics
- Matches played: 6
- Goals scored: 19 (3.17 per match)
- Attendance: 73,903 (12,317 per match)
- Top goal scorer: Camilo (3 goals)

Awards
- George Gross Memorial Trophy: Justin Mapp

The 2013 Canadian Championship (officially the Amway Canadian Championship for sponsorship reasons) was a soccer tournament hosted and organized by the Canadian Soccer Association that took place in the cities of Edmonton, Montreal, Toronto and Vancouver in 2013. As in the previous tournament, participating teams included FC Edmonton, the Montreal Impact, Toronto FC and Vancouver Whitecaps FC. The Montreal Impact won the Voyageurs Cup and became Canada's entry into the group stage of the 2013–14 CONCACAF Champions League. It was the sixth edition of the annual Canadian Championship.

== Teams ==
Team	2012 league position	Appearance
Vancouver Whitecaps FC	11th in MLS	3rd
Montreal Impact	12th in MLS	2nd
Toronto FC	19th in MLS	6th
FC Edmonton	8th in NASL	3rd

== Bracket ==
The teams were seeded based on 2012 league results. The three Major League Soccer teams were seeded first, second and third based on their final regular season position during the 2012 MLS season, while the sole North American Soccer League team received the fourth seed.

Each round was a two-legged series with the away goals rule.

Semi-finals
MLS	Toronto FC	2	0	2
MLS	Montreal Impact	0	6	6
NASL	FC Edmonton	2	0	2
MLS	Vancouver Whitecaps FC	3	2	5

Final
MLS	Montreal Impact (a)	0	2	2
MLS	Vancouver Whitecaps FC	0	2	2

== Matches ==
=== Semi-finals ===
April 24
7:45 pm EDT

Toronto FC	2−0	Montreal Impact
Henry 49'; Wiedeman 81'	Report

BMO Field, Toronto, Ontario
Attendance: 11,043
Referee: Paul Ward
May 1
7:45 pm EDT

Montreal Impact	6−0	Toronto FC
Mapp 24'; Paponi 33'; Di Vaio 44', 90'; Romero 61'; Wenger 90+4'	Report

Saputo Stadium, Montreal, Quebec
Attendance: 14,931
Referee: Drew Fischer

Montreal Impact won 6−2 on aggregate.

April 24
7:45 pm MDT

FC Edmonton	2−3	Vancouver Whitecaps FC
Cox 8'; Nurse 28'	Report	Camilo 5', 83'; Heinemann 89'

Commonwealth Stadium, Edmonton, Alberta
Attendance: 2,838
Referee: Silviu Petrescu
May 1
7:15 pm PDT

Vancouver Whitecaps FC	2−0	FC Edmonton
Hertzog 58'; Saiko 67' (o.g.)	Report

BC Place, Vancouver, British Columbia
Attendance: 14,892
Referee: Geoff Gamble

Vancouver Whitecaps FC won 5−2 on aggregate.

=== Final ===
May 15
7:30 pm EDT

Montreal Impact	0−0	Vancouver Whitecaps FC
	Report

Saputo Stadium, Montreal, Quebec
Attendance: 12,016
Referee: Silviu Petrescu

Team details

Montreal Impact	Vancouver Whitecaps FC

GK	30	Evan Bush
DF	5	Jeb Brovsky
DF	13	Matteo Ferrari
DF	17	Dennis Iapichino
DF	6	Hassoun Camara	(yellow card) 25'
MF	21	Justin Mapp
MF	15	Andrés Romero		(substituted off) 72'
MF	18	Collen Warner	(yellow card) 31'	(substituted off) 62'
FW	8	Patrice Bernier (c)
FW	9	Marco Di Vaio	(yellow card) 33'
FW	33	Andrew Wenger		(substituted off) 81'
Substitutes
MF	28	Sinisa Ubiparipovic		(substituted on) 81'
FW	7	Felipe		(substituted on) 62'
FW	19	Blake Smith		(substituted on) 72'
Manager
(Switzerland) Marco Schällibaum

GK	18	Brad Knighton
DF	2	Jordan Harvey
DF	40	Andy O'Brien	(yellow card) 25'
DF	16	Johnny Leveron
DF	3	Brad Rusin
DF	4	Alain Rochat		(substituted off) 79'
MF	13	Nigel Reo-Coker
MF	28	Gershon Koffie
MF	8	Matt Watson
MF	31	Russell Teibert
FW	11	Darren Mattocks		(substituted off) 65'
Substitutes
FW	26	Corey Hertzog		(substituted on) 65'
FW	19	Erik Hurtado		(substituted on) 79'
Manager
(Scotland) Martin Rennie

Assistant referees
Philippe Brière
Lyes Arfa
Fourth official
Geoff Gamble

May 29
7:00 pm PDT

Vancouver Whitecaps FC	2–2	Montreal Impact
Camilo 4'; Kobayashi 69'	Report	Felipe 49'; Camara 84'

BC Place, Vancouver, British Columbia
Attendance: 18,183
Referee: Drew Fischer

Team details

Vancouver Whitecaps FC	Montreal Impact

GK	18	Brad Knighton
DF	40	Andy O'Brien
DF	12	Lee Young-Pyo
DF	16	Johnny Leveron
DF	4	Alain Rochat
MF	27	Jun Marques Davidson
MF	28	Gershon Koffie	(substituted off) 57'
MF	13	Nigel Reo-Coker
FW	9	Kenny Miller
FW	31	Russell Teibert	(substituted off) 73'
FW	7	Camilo	(substituted off) 82'
Substitutes
FW	11	Darren Mattocks	(substituted on) 82'
DF	2	Jordan Harvey	(substituted on) 73'
MF	14	Daigo Kobayashi	(substituted on) 57'
Manager
(Scotland) Martin Rennie

GK	30	Evan Bush
DF	5	Jeb Brovsky		(substituted off) 82'
DF	13	Matteo Ferrari
DF	14	Alessandro Nesta
DF	6	Hassoun Camara	(yellow card) 6'
MF	21	Justin Mapp
MF	15	Andrés Romero		(substituted off) 73'
MF	7	Felipe		(substituted off) 88'
MF	8	Patrice Bernier (c)
FW	9	Marco Di Vaio
FW	33	Andrew Wenger
Substitutes
DF	17	Dennis Iapichino		(substituted on) 88'
MF	18	Collen Warner		(substituted on) 82'
FW	19	Blake Smith		(substituted on) 73'
Manager
(Switzerland) Marco Schällibaum

Assistant referees
Daniel Belleau
Richard Gamache
Fourth official
Paul Ward

2–2 on aggregate. Montreal Impact won on away goals.

== Goalscorers ==
Rank	Player	Team	Goals
1	(Brazil) Camilo	Vancouver Whitecaps FC	3
2	(Italy) Marco Di Vaio	Montreal Impact	2
3	(France) Hassoun Camara	Montreal Impact	1
3	(Canada) Michael Cox	FC Edmonton	1
3	(Brazil) Felipe	Montreal Impact	1
3	(United States) Tom Heinemann	Vancouver Whitecaps FC	1
3	(Canada) Doneil Henry	Toronto FC	1
3	(United States) Corey Hertzog	Vancouver Whitecaps FC	1
3	(Japan) Daigo Kobayashi	Vancouver Whitecaps FC	1
3	(United States) Justin Mapp	Montreal Impact	1
3	(Guyana) Chris Nurse	FC Edmonton	1
3	(Italy) Daniele Paponi	Montreal Impact	1
3	(Argentina) Andrés Romero	Montreal Impact	1
3	(United States) Andrew Wenger	Montreal Impact	1
3	(United States) Andrew Wiedeman	Toronto FC	1
