= List of Major League Soccer transfers 2014 =

The following is a list of transfers for the 2014 Major League Soccer season. On August 9, 2013, Juan Agudelo reached an agreement to join to English Premier League side Stoke City on a free transfer following the conclusion of the 2013 season. However, on November 20, 2013, Stoke City announced that the deal fell through after Agudelo's work permit was denied. Later on in the year, the LA Galaxy acquired Baggio Husidić from Swedish side Hammarby IF. However, that move did not take effect until January 1, 2014. The rest of the moves were made during the 2013–14 MLS offseason all the way through the roster freeze in September 2014.

== Transfers ==
| Date | Name | Moving from | Moving to | Mode of Transfer |
|---|---|---|---|---|
| November 11, 2013 | (United States) Baggio Husidić | (Sweden) Hammarby IF | LA Galaxy | Free |
| November 22, 2013 | (Portugal) José Gonçalves | (Switzerland) FC Sion | New England Revolution | Undisclosed |
| November 25, 2013 | (United States) Paolo DelPiccolo | Montreal Impact | New England Revolution | Waiver Draft |
| November 25, 2013 | (United States) Brad Stuver | Unattached | Columbus Crew | Waiver Draft |
| November 26, 2013 | (Costa Rica) Waylon Francis | (Costa Rica) Herediano | Columbus Crew | Free |
| November 26, 2013 | (United States) Matt Wiet | (United States) Dayton Dutch Lions | Columbus Crew | Free |
| December 9, 2013 | (Brazil) Jackson | FC Dallas | Toronto FC | Trade |
| December 10, 2013 | (United States) Davy Arnaud | Montreal Impact | D.C. United | Trade |
| December 10, 2013 | (Switzerland) Stefan Frei | Toronto FC | Seattle Sounders FC | Trade |
| December 11, 2013 | (United States) Tristan Bowen | Chivas USA | Seattle Sounders FC | Trade |
| December 11, 2013 | (United States) Brad Knighton | Vancouver Whitecaps FC | New England Revolution | Trade |
| December 11, 2013 | (Argentina) Mauro Rosales | Seattle Sounders FC | Chivas USA | Trade |
| December 12, 2013 | (United States) Corben Bone | Chicago Fire | Philadelphia Union | Re-Entry Draft |
| December 12, 2013 | (United States) Bobby Boswell | Houston Dynamo | D.C. United | Re-Entry Draft |
| December 12, 2013 | (United States) Marc Burch | Seattle Sounders FC | Colorado Rapids | Re-Entry Draft |
| December 12, 2013 | (United States) Sean Franklin | LA Galaxy | D.C. United | Re-Entry Draft |
| December 12, 2013 | (United States) Andrew Jean-Baptiste | Portland Timbers | Chivas USA | Trade |
| December 12, 2013 | (United States) Chad Marshall | Columbus Crew | Seattle Sounders FC | Trade |
| December 12, 2013 | (United States) Daniel Paladini | Chicago Fire | Columbus Crew | Trade |
| December 12, 2013 | (United States) Jorge Villafaña | Chivas USA | Portland Timbers | Trade |
| December 12, 2013 | (Democratic Republic of the Congo) Steve Zakuani | Seattle Sounders FC | Portland Timbers | Re-Entry Draft |
| December 13, 2013 | (United States) Kenny Cooper | FC Dallas | Seattle Sounders FC | Trade |
| December 13, 2013 | (United States) Bobby Convey | Toronto FC | New York Red Bulls | Trade |
| December 13, 2013 | (United States) Conor Doyle | (England) Derby County | D.C. United | Undisclosed |
| December 13, 2013 | (Brazil) Gilberto | (Brazil) Internacional | Toronto FC | Undisclosed |
| December 13, 2013 | (Scotland) Adam Moffat | Seattle Sounders FC | FC Dallas | Trade |
| December 13, 2013 | (Jamaica) Lovel Palmer | Real Salt Lake | Chicago Fire | Trade |
| December 13, 2013 | (United States) Sal Zizzo | Portland Timbers | Sporting Kansas City | Trade |
| December 16, 2013 | (United States) Steve Clark | (Norway) Hønefoss BK | Columbus Crew | Undisclosed |
| December 16, 2013 | (United States) Andy Gruenebaum | Columbus Crew | Sporting Kansas City | Trade |
| December 17, 2013 | (United States) David Horst | Portland Timbers | Houston Dynamo | Trade |
| December 17, 2013 | (United States) Eddie Johnson | Seattle Sounders FC | D.C. United | Trade |
| December 17, 2013 | (United States) Justin Morrow | San Jose Earthquakes | Toronto FC | Trade |
| December 18, 2013 | (Canada) Nana Attakora | San Jose Earthquakes | D.C. United | Re-Entry Draft |
| December 18, 2013 | (Morocco) Mehdi Ballouchy | San Jose Earthquakes | Vancouver Whitecaps FC | Re-Entry Draft |
| December 18, 2013 | (United States) Brandon Barklage | New York Red Bulls | San Jose Earthquakes | Re-Entry Draft |
| December 18, 2013 | (United States) Chad Barrett | New England Revolution | Seattle Sounders FC | Re-Entry Draft |
| December 18, 2013 | (Canada) Dwayne De Rosario | D.C. United | Toronto FC | Re-Entry Draft |
| December 18, 2013 | (Argentina) Fabián Espíndola | New York Red Bulls | D.C. United | Re-Entry Draft |
| December 18, 2013 | (Jamaica) Shaun Francis | Chicago Fire | San Jose Earthquakes | Re-Entry Draft |
| December 18, 2013 | (United States) Corey Hertzog | Vancouver Whitecaps FC | Seattle Sounders FC | Re-Entry Draft |
| December 19, 2013 | (United States) Zarek Valentin | Montreal Impact | (Norway) Bodø/Glimt | Undisclosed |
| December 23, 2013 | (Mexico) Rafael Baca | San Jose Earthquakes | (Mexico) Cruz Azul | Undisclosed |
| December 23, 2013 | (United States) Michael Farfan | Philadelphia Union | (Mexico) Cruz Azul | Undisclosed |
| December 23, 2013 | (United States) Jose Villarreal | LA Galaxy | (Mexico) Cruz Azul | Loan |
| December 24, 2013 | (United States) Clint Dempsey | Seattle Sounders FC | (England) Fulham | Loan |
| January 7, 2014 | (Honduras) Marvin Chávez | San Jose Earthquakes | Colorado Rapids | Trade |
| January 7, 2014 | (Saint Kitts and Nevis) Atiba Harris | Colorado Rapids | San Jose Earthquakes | Trade |
| January 7, 2014 | (France) Jean-Baptiste Pierazzi | (France) AC Ajaccio | San Jose Earthquakes | Undisclosed |
| January 7, 2014 | (Brazil) Samuel | (Brazil) Fluminense | LA Galaxy | Loan |
| January 9, 2014 | (United States) Charlie Davies | (Denmark) Randers FC | New England Revolution | Free |
| January 9, 2014 | (United States) Brian Span | (Sweden) Djurgårdens IF | FC Dallas | Lottery |
| January 10, 2014 | (England) Jermain Defoe | (England) Tottenham Hotspur | Toronto FC | Undisclosed |
| January 10, 2014 | (United States) Kyle Reynish | (United States) New York Cosmos | Chicago Fire | Free |
| January 10, 2014 | (United States) Andrew Weber | (United States) Phoenix FC | Portland Timbers | Free |
| January 13, 2014 | (United States) Michael Bradley | (Italy) Roma | Toronto FC | $10m |
| January 13, 2014 | (Canada) Rob Friend | (Germany) Eintracht Frankfurt | LA Galaxy | Free |
| January 13, 2014 | (United States) Michael Parkhurst | (Germany) FC Augsburg | Columbus Crew | Undisclosed |
| January 14, 2014 | (Mexico) Adolfo Bautista | Unattached | Chivas USA | Free |
| January 14, 2014 | (Canada) Dejan Jakovic | D.C. United | (Japan) Shimizu S-Pulse | Undisclosed |
| January 14, 2014 | (United States) Hector Jiménez | LA Galaxy | Columbus Crew | Trade |
| January 14, 2014 | (United States) Jeff Parke | Philadelphia Union | D.C. United | Trade |
| January 14, 2014 | (United States) Billy Schuler | (Sweden) Hammarby IF | San Jose Earthquakes | Lottery |
| January 14, 2014 | (United States) Ethan White | D.C. United | Philadelphia Union | Trade |
| January 15, 2014 | (United States) Jalil Anibaba | Chicago Fire | Seattle Sounders FC | Trade |
| January 15, 2014 | (Argentina) Gastón Fernández | (Argentina) Estudiantes LP | Portland Timbers | Undisclosed |
| January 15, 2014 | (Colombia) Jhon Kennedy Hurtado | Seattle Sounders FC | Chicago Fire | Trade |
| January 15, 2014 | (United States) Patrick Ianni | Seattle Sounders FC | Chicago Fire | Trade |
| January 15, 2014 | (Argentina) Cristian Maidana | (Chile) Rangers | Philadelphia Union | Undisclosed |
| January 15, 2014 | (Argentina) Norberto Paparatto | (Argentina) Tigre | Portland Timbers | Undisclosed |
| January 15, 2014 | (Colombia) José Adolfo Valencia | Portland Timbers | (Argentina) Olimpo | Loan |
| January 17, 2014 | (Brazil) Camilo | Vancouver Whitecaps FC | (Mexico) Querétaro | Undisclosed |
| January 21, 2014 | (United States) Tony Cascio | Colorado Rapids | Houston Dynamo | Loan |
| January 21, 2014 | (Cameroon) Charles Eloundou | (Cameroon) Coton Sport | Colorado Rapids | Undisclosed |
| January 21, 2014 | (England) Luke Mulholland | (United States) Tampa Bay Rowdies | Real Salt Lake | Free |
| January 22, 2014 | (Cuba) Yordany Álvarez | Real Salt Lake | (United States) Orlando City | Loan |
| January 22, 2014 | (New Zealand) Tony Lochhead | (New Zealand) Wellington Phoenix | Chivas USA | Undisclosed |
| January 23, 2014 | (United States) Andrew Ribeiro | (United States) Harrisburg City Islanders | Chivas USA | Free |
| January 24, 2014 | (Haiti) Christiano François | Unattached | D.C. United | Waiver Draft |
| January 24, 2014 | (United States) Giuseppe Gentile | Unattached | Chicago Fire | Waiver Draft |
| January 24, 2014 | (Spain) Armando Lozano | (Spain) Córdoba | New York Red Bulls | Undisclosed |
| January 24, 2014 | (United States) Bryan Meredith | (United States) New York Cosmos | San Jose Earthquakes | Free |
| January 24, 2014 | (England) Bradley Orr | (England) Blackburn Rovers | Toronto FC | Loan |
| January 27, 2014 | (Iran) Steven Beitashour | San Jose Earthquakes | Vancouver Whitecaps FC | Trade |
| January 27, 2014 | (England) Richard Eckersley | Toronto FC | New York Red Bulls | Trade |
| January 27, 2014 | (United States) Maurice Edu | (England) Stoke City | Philadelphia Union | Loan |
| January 27, 2014 | (United States) Fejiro Okiomah | (United States) Charlotte Eagles | Chivas USA | Free |
| January 27, 2014 | (United States) Donny Toia | (United States) Phoenix FC | Chivas USA | Free |
| January 30, 2014 | (Sweden) Stefan Ishizaki | (Sweden) Elfsborg | LA Galaxy | Undisclosed |
| January 30, 2014 | (Colombia) Fredy Montero | Seattle Sounders FC | (Portugal) Sporting CP | Undisclosed |
| January 30, 2014 | (France) Vincent Nogueira | (France) Sochaux | Philadelphia Union | Undisclosed |
| January 31, 2014 | (Guatemala) Marco Pappa | (Netherlands) Heerenveen | Seattle Sounders FC | Allocation |
| February 3, 2014 | (United States) Gabriel Farfan | Chivas USA | (Mexico) Chiapas | Loan |
| February 3, 2014 | (United States) Brian Holt | Unattached | Philadelphia Union | Free |
| February 5, 2014 | (Uruguay) Sebastián Fernández | (Uruguay) Boston River | Vancouver Whitecaps FC | Loan |
| February 5, 2014 | (United States) Benji Joya | (Mexico) Santos Laguna | Chicago Fire | Loan via Lottery |
| February 5, 2014 | (Uruguay) Nicolás Mezquida | (Uruguay) Boston River | Vancouver Whitecaps FC | Undisclosed |
| February 7, 2014 | (Spain) Christian | Unattached | D.C. United | Free |
| February 12, 2014 | (United States) Joe Nasco | (United States) Atlanta Silverbacks | Colorado Rapids | Free |
| February 12, 2014 | (Honduras) Hendry Thomas | Colorado Rapids | FC Dallas | Trade |
| February 13, 2014 | (Colombia) Jimmy Medranda | (Colombia) Deportivo Pereira | Sporting Kansas City | Undisclosed |
| February 14, 2014 | (Brazil) Júlio César | (England) Queens Park Rangers | Toronto FC | Loan |
| February 14, 2014 | (Colombia) Andrés Ramiro Escobar | (Ukraine) Dynamo Kyiv | FC Dallas | Loan |
| February 14, 2014 | (Uruguay) Santiago González | (Uruguay) Sud América | Montreal Impact | Undisclosed |
| February 18, 2014 | (United States) Bryan Gallego | Portland Timbers | (United States) Sacramento Republic FC | Loan |
| February 18, 2014 | (New Zealand) Jake Gleeson | Portland Timbers | (United States) Sacramento Republic FC | Loan |
| February 18, 2014 | (Italy) Paolo Tornaghi | Unattached | Vancouver Whitecaps FC | Free |
| February 19, 2014 | (United States) Teal Bunbury | Sporting Kansas City | New England Revolution | Trade |
| February 19, 2014 | (Argentina) Agustín Pelletieri | (Argentina) Racing Club | Chivas USA | Undisclosed |
| February 21, 2014 | (Costa Rica) Giancarlo González | (Norway) Vålerenga | Columbus Crew | Undisclosed |
| February 21, 2014 | (Uruguay) David Texeira | (Netherlands) Groningen | FC Dallas | Undisclosed |
| February 24, 2014 | (United States) Austin Berry | Chicago Fire | Philadelphia Union | Trade |
| February 24, 2014 | (England) Luke Moore | (Turkey) Elazığspor | Chivas USA | Undisclosed |
| February 26, 2014 | (Japan) Daigo Kobayashi | Vancouver Whitecaps FC | New England Revolution | Trade |
| February 26, 2014 | (Argentina) Matías Laba | Toronto FC | Vancouver Whitecaps FC | Trade |
| February 26, 2014 | (United States) Jimmy Ockford | Seattle Sounders FC | (United States) New York Cosmos | Loan |
| February 26, 2014 | (United States) Bobby Warshaw | FC Dallas | (Sweden) GAIS | Undisclosed |
| February 27, 2014 | (United States) David Bingham | San Jose Earthquakes | (United States) San Antonio Scorpions | Loan |
| February 27, 2014 | (Haiti) Christiano François | D.C. United | (United States) Richmond Kickers | Loan |
| February 27, 2014 | (United States) Sam Garza | San Jose Earthquakes | (United States) San Antonio Scorpions | Loan |
| February 27, 2014 | (Jamaica) Ryan Johnson | Portland Timbers | (China) Henan Jianye | Undisclosed |
| February 27, 2014 | (United States) Collin Martin | D.C. United | (United States) Richmond Kickers | Loan |
| February 27, 2014 | (United States) Jalen Robinson | D.C. United | (United States) Richmond Kickers | Loan |
| February 27, 2014 | (United States) Joe Willis | D.C. United | (United States) Richmond Kickers | Loan |
| February 28, 2014 | (United States) Eriq Zavaleta | Seattle Sounders FC | Chivas USA | Loan |
| March 3, 2014 | (United States) Greg Cochrane | LA Galaxy | Chicago Fire | Trade |
| March 3, 2014 | (Spain) Daniel Fragoso | (Spain) Hospitalet | Chivas USA | Undisclosed |
| March 4, 2014 | (United States) Alex Caskey | Seattle Sounders FC | D.C. United | Trade |
| March 4, 2014 | (Germany) Andreas Görlitz | Unattached | San Jose Earthquakes | Free |
| March 4, 2014 | (Spain) José Marí | (Spain) Real Zaragoza | Colorado Rapids | Undisclosed |
| March 4, 2014 | (United States) James Riley | Unattached | LA Galaxy | Free |
| March 5, 2014 | (United States) Aaron Long | Portland Timbers | (United States) Sacramento Republic FC | Loan |
| March 5, 2014 | (Chile) Pedro Morales | (Spain) Málaga | Vancouver Whitecaps FC | Undisclosed |
| March 5, 2014 | (Mexico) Gonzalo Pineda | Unattached | Seattle Sounders FC | Free |
| March 5, 2014 | (England) Matt Watson | Vancouver Whitecaps FC | Chicago Fire | Trade |
| March 6, 2014 | (Uganda) Micheal Azira | Unattached | Seattle Sounders FC | Free |
| March 6, 2014 | (Argentina) Leandro Barrera | (Argentina) Argentinos Juniors | Chivas USA | Loan |
| March 6, 2014 | (United States) Heath Pearce | Unattached | Montreal Impact | Free |
| March 7, 2014 | (Ghana) Aminu Abdallah | Vancouver Whitecaps FC | (United States) Charleston Battery | Loan |
| March 7, 2014 | (Senegal) Mamadou Diouf | Vancouver Whitecaps FC | (United States) Charleston Battery | Loan |
| March 7, 2014 | (United States) Dan Gargan | Unattached | LA Galaxy | Free |
| March 7, 2014 | (Jamaica) Andre Lewis | Vancouver Whitecaps FC | (United States) Charleston Battery | Loan |
| March 7, 2014 | (United States) Ryan Neil | Unattached | San Jose Earthquakes | Free |
| March 7, 2014 | (Cameroon) Ambroise Oyongo | (Cameroon) Coton Sport | New York Red Bulls | Undisclosed |
| March 9, 2014 | (United States) Trevor Spangenberg | Unattached | Chivas USA | Free |
| March 10, 2014 | (Portugal) Yannick Djaló | (Portugal) Benfica | San Jose Earthquakes | Loan |
| March 12, 2014 | (Spain) Antonio Dovale | (Spain) Celta de Vigo | Sporting Kansas City | Undisclosed |
| March 12, 2014 | (United States) Ryan Finley | Columbus Crew | (United States) Dayton Dutch Lions | Loan |
| March 12, 2014 | (United States) Ross Friedman | Columbus Crew | (United States) Dayton Dutch Lions | Loan |
| March 12, 2014 | (Trinidad and Tobago) Kevan George | Columbus Crew | (United States) Dayton Dutch Lions | Loan |
| March 12, 2014 | (Jamaica) Khari Stephenson | Unattached | San Jose Earthquakes | Free |
| March 12, 2014 | (United States) Brad Stuver | Columbus Crew | (United States) Dayton Dutch Lions | Loan |
| March 12, 2014 | (United States) Matt Walker | Columbus Crew | (United States) Dayton Dutch Lions | Loan |
| March 12, 2014 | (United States) Cam Weaver | Unattached | Seattle Sounders FC | Free |
| March 13, 2014 | (United States) Luis Soffner | New England Revolution | (United States) Rochester Rhinos | Loan |
| March 13, 2014 | (United States) Alec Sundly | New England Revolution | (United States) Rochester Rhinos | Loan |
| March 17, 2014 | (Canada) Manny Aparicio | Toronto FC | (United States) Wilmington Hammerheads | Loan |
| March 17, 2014 | (United States) Christian Duke | Sporting Kansas City | (United States) Oklahoma City Energy FC | Loan |
| March 17, 2014 | (United States) Jon Kempin | Sporting Kansas City | (United States) Oklahoma City Energy FC | Loan |
| March 17, 2014 | (United States) Mikey Lopez | Sporting Kansas City | (United States) Orlando City | Loan |
| March 17, 2014 | (United States) Daniel Lovitz | Toronto FC | (United States) Wilmington Hammerheads | Loan |
| March 17, 2014 | (Canada) Quillan Roberts | Toronto FC | (United States) Wilmington Hammerheads | Loan |
| March 18, 2014 | (United States) Taylor Peay | Portland Timbers | (United States) Orange County Blues FC | Loan |
| March 18, 2014 | (Zimbabwe) Schillo Tshuma | Portland Timbers | (United States) Orange County Blues FC | Loan |
| March 20, 2014 | (Brazil) Fred | Unattached | Philadelphia Union | Waiver Draft |
| March 21, 2014 | (United States) Rafael Garcia | LA Galaxy | (United States) LA Galaxy II | Loan |
| March 21, 2014 | (Mexico) Cristhian Hernández | Philadelphia Union | (United States) Harrisburg City Islanders | Loan |
| March 21, 2014 | (United States) Bradford Jamieson IV | LA Galaxy | (United States) LA Galaxy II | Loan |
| March 21, 2014 | (United States) Jack McBean | LA Galaxy | (United States) LA Galaxy II | Loan |
| March 21, 2014 | (United States) Jimmy McLaughlin | Philadelphia Union | (United States) Harrisburg City Islanders | Loan |
| March 21, 2014 | (Mexico) Raul Mendiola | LA Galaxy | (United States) LA Galaxy II | Loan |
| March 21, 2014 | (United States) Kofi Opare | LA Galaxy | (United States) LA Galaxy II | Loan |
| March 21, 2014 | (United States) Matt Pickens | Unattached | New England Revolution | Waiver Draft |
| March 21, 2014 | (United States) Charlie Rugg | LA Galaxy | (United States) LA Galaxy II | Loan |
| March 21, 2014 | (United States) Omar Salgado | Vancouver Whitecaps FC | (United States) Charleston Battery | Loan |
| March 21, 2014 | (United States) Jossimar Sanchez | New England Revolution | (United States) Rochester Rhinos | Loan |
| March 21, 2014 | (United States) Oscar Sorto | LA Galaxy | (United States) LA Galaxy II | Loan |
| March 21, 2014 | (United States) Kyle Venter | LA Galaxy | (United States) LA Galaxy II | Loan |
| March 21, 2014 | (United States) Kenney Walker | LA Galaxy | (United States) LA Galaxy II | Loan |
| March 22, 2014 | (England) Grant Ward | (England) Tottenham Hotspur | Chicago Fire | Loan |
| March 24, 2014 | (United States) Anthony Arena | Houston Dynamo | (United States) Pittsburgh Riverhounds | Loan |
| March 24, 2014 | (Jamaica) Jason Johnson | Houston Dynamo | (United States) Pittsburgh Riverhounds | Loan |
| March 24, 2014 | (United States) Bryan Salazar | Houston Dynamo | (United States) Pittsburgh Riverhounds | Loan |
| March 25, 2014 | (Jamaica) Michael Seaton | D.C. United | (United States) Richmond Kickers | Loan |
| March 26, 2014 | (United States) Matt Pickens | New England Revolution | (United States) Tampa Bay Rowdies | Undisclosed |
| March 27, 2014 | (United States) Richie Marquez | Philadelphia Union | (United States) Harrisburg City Islanders | Loan |
| March 27, 2014 | (Brazil) Pedro Ribeiro | Philadelphia Union | (United States) Harrisburg City Islanders | Loan |
| March 28, 2014 | (United States) Mike Fucito | San Jose Earthquakes | (United States) Sacramento Republic FC | Loan |
| March 28, 2014 | (Canada) Zakaria Messoudi | Montreal Impact | (Canada) Ottawa Fury FC | Loan |
| March 28, 2014 | (Canada) Issey Nakajima-Farran | Unattached | Toronto FC | Free |
| March 28, 2014 | (Martinique) Kévin Parsemain | (Martinique) Rivière-Pilote | Seattle Sounders FC | Undisclosed |
| April 2, 2014 | (Austria) Thomas Piermayr | Unattached | Colorado Rapids | Free |
| April 2, 2014 | (United States) Chris Rolfe | Chicago Fire | D.C. United | Trade |
| April 2, 2014 | (United States) Brian Span | FC Dallas | (United States) Orlando City | Loan |
| April 3, 2014 | (United States) David Estrada | Seattle Sounders FC | (United States) Atlanta Silverbacks | Loan |
| April 3, 2014 | (United States) Michael Lisch | Houston Dynamo | (United States) Pittsburgh Riverhounds | Loan |
| April 3, 2014 | (United States) Brian Ownby | Houston Dynamo | (United States) Pittsburgh Riverhounds | Loan |
| April 4, 2014 | (Brazil) Igor Julião | (Brazil) Fluminense | Sporting Kansas City | Loan |
| April 4, 2014 | (United States) Jack McInerney | Philadelphia Union | Montreal Impact | Trade |
| April 4, 2014 | (United States) Andrew Wenger | Montreal Impact | Philadelphia Union | Trade |
| April 8, 2014 | (United States) Jonathan Top | FC Dallas | (United States) Arizona United | Loan |
| April 9, 2014 | (United States) Larry Jackson | Unattached | New England Revolution | Free |
| April 10, 2014 | (United States) Giuseppe Gentile | Chicago Fire | (United States) Charlotte Eagles | Loan |
| April 10, 2014 | (Argentina) Martín Rivero | Colorado Rapids | Chivas USA | Trade |
| April 17, 2014 | (United States) Matt Dunn | Unattached | Chivas USA | Waiver Draft |
| April 22, 2014 | (Grenada) Shalrie Joseph | Unattached | New England Revolution | Waiver Draft |
| April 23, 2014 | (United States) George Fochive | Portland Timbers | (United States) Sacramento Republic FC | Loan |
| April 23, 2014 | (United States) Adam Jahn | San Jose Earthquakes | (United States) Sacramento Republic FC | Loan |
| April 23, 2014 | (United States) Donnie Smith | New England Revolution | (United States) Rochester Rhinos | Loan |
| April 24, 2014 | (United States) Bryan Gallego | Portland Timbers | (United States) Arizona United | Loan |
| May 1, 2014 | (Canada) Jordan Hamilton | Toronto FC | (United States) Wilmington Hammerheads | Loan |
| May 8, 2014 | (United States) Gale Agbossoumonde | Toronto FC | Colorado Rapids | Trade |
| May 8, 2014 | (Honduras) Marvin Chávez | Colorado Rapids | Chivas USA | Trade |
| May 8, 2014 | (United States) Ryan Finley | Columbus Crew | Chivas USA | Trade |
| May 8, 2014 | (England) Luke Moore | Chivas USA | Colorado Rapids | Trade |
| May 8, 2014 | (England) Luke Moore | Colorado Rapids | Toronto FC | Trade |
| May 8, 2014 | (Zimbabwe) Schillo Tshuma | Portland Timbers | (United States) Arizona United | Loan |
| May 9, 2014 | (United States) Jalen Robinson | D.C. United | (United States) Arizona United | Loan |
| May 13, 2014 | (Nigeria) Fanendo Adi | (Denmark) Copenhagen | Portland Timbers | Loan |
| May 13, 2014 | (United States) Blake Smith | Montreal Impact | (United States) Indy Eleven | Loan |
| May 14, 2014 | (United States) John Neeskens | Unattached | Colorado Rapids | Free |
| May 16, 2014 | (Canada) Issey Nakajima-Farran | Toronto FC | Montreal Impact | Trade |
| May 16, 2014 | (United States) Collen Warner | Montreal Impact | Toronto FC | Trade |
| May 27, 2014 | (United States) Danny O'Rourke | Unattached | Portland Timbers | Free |
| June 2, 2014 | (The Gambia) Mamadou Danso | Portland Timbers | Montreal Impact | Trade |
| June 3, 2014 | (Spain) Oriol Rosell | Sporting Kansas City | (Portugal) Sporting CP | Undisclosed |
| June 6, 2014 | (Haiti) Mechack Jérôme | Unattached | Montreal Impact | Free |
| June 6, 2014 | (Ghana) Dominic Oduro | Columbus Crew | Toronto FC | Trade |
| June 6, 2014 | (Spain) Álvaro Rey | Toronto FC | Columbus Crew | Trade |
| June 11, 2014 | (Spain) Gorka Larrea | Unattached | Montreal Impact | Free |
| June 13, 2014 | (United States) Victor Pineda | Chicago Fire | Indy Eleven | Loan |
| June 24, 2014 | (Japan) Akira Kaji | (Japan) Gamba Osaka | Chivas USA | Undisclosed |
| June 24, 2014 | (Mexico) Richard Sánchez | FC Dallas | (Mexico) UANL | Undisclosed |
| June 25, 2014 | (England) Liam Ridgewell | (England) West Bromwich Albion | Portland Timbers | Free |
| June 26, 2014 | (Poland) Krzysztof Król | (Poland) Piast Gliwice | Montreal Impact | Free |
| July 1, 2014 | (United States) Carlos Alvarez | Chivas USA | Colorado Rapids | Trade |
| July 1, 2014 | (United States) Nathan Sturgis | Colorado Rapids | Chivas USA | Trade |
| July 2, 2014 | (Argentina) Ignacio Piatti | (Argentina) San Lorenzo | Montreal Impact | Undisclosed |
| July 3, 2014 | (Ecuador) Juan Luis Anangonó | Chicago Fire | (Ecuador) LDU Quito | Loan |
| July 5, 2014 | (United States) Matthew Fondy | Unattached | Chicago Fire | Free |
| July 8, 2014 | (Ghana) Michael Kafari | Unattached | Sporting Kansas City | Free |
| July 12, 2014 | (Jamaica) Brian Brown | (Jamaica) Harbour View | Philadelphia Union | Loan |
| July 14, 2014 | (Romania) Răzvan Cociș | (Ukraine) Hoverla Uzhhorod | Chicago Fire | Undisclosed |
| July 16, 2014 | (Honduras) Jorge Claros | (Honduras) Motagua | Sporting Kansas City | Free |
| July 16, 2014 | (Philippines) Martin Steuble | (Switzerland) Wil | Sporting Kansas City | Free |
| July 17, 2014 | (United States) David Estrada | Seattle Sounders FC | (United States) Charlotte Eagles | Loan |
| July 18, 2014 | (United States) Aaron Long | Unattached | Seattle Sounders FC | Free |
| July 23, 2014 | (United States) DaMarcus Beasley | (Mexico) Puebla | Houston Dynamo | Allocation |
| July 23, 2014 | (United States) Warren Creavalle | Houston Dynamo | Toronto FC | Trade |
| July 25, 2014 | (Honduras) Jerry Bengtson | New England Revolution | (Argentina) Belgrano | Loan |
| July 25, 2014 | (United States) Ian Christianson | New York Red Bulls | (United States) Orlando City | Loan |
| July 25, 2014 | (Honduras) Luis Garrido | (Honduras) Olimpia | Houston Dynamo | Undisclosed |
| July 28, 2014 | (United States) Connor Lade | New York Red Bulls | (United States) New York Cosmos | Loan |
| July 28, 2014 | (France) Damien Perrinelle | (France) Istres | New York Red Bulls | Free |
| July 29, 2014 | (United States) Dilly Duka | Chicago Fire | Montreal Impact | Trade |
| July 29, 2014 | (The Gambia) Sanna Nyassi | Montreal Impact | Chicago Fire | Trade |
| July 29, 2014 | (United States) Kofi Opare | LA Galaxy | D.C. United | Trade |
| July 30, 2014 | (Canada) Jordan Hamilton | Toronto FC | (Portugal) Trofense | Loan |
| July 30, 2014 | (Algeria) Raïs M'Bolhi | (Bulgaria) CSKA Sofia | Philadelphia Union | Undisclosed |
| July 31, 2014 | (Argentina) Matías Pérez García | (Argentina) Tigre | San Jose Earthquakes | Undisclosed |

- ^1 Player officially joined his new club on January 1, 2014.
- ^2 Only rights to player were acquired.
- ^3 Move involved a sign-and-trade deal with another club.
