= 2014 Montreal Impact season =

Montreal Impact
2014 season
- Owner and president: Joey Saputo
- Coach: Frank Klopas
- Major League Soccer: Conference: 10th (last); Overall: 19th (last)
- Canadian Championship: Champion
- Top goalscorer: League: Di Vaio (9); All: Di Vaio (13)
- Highest home attendance: 27,207 v Seattle Sounders FC (March 23, 2014)
- Lowest home attendance: 13,916 v LA Galaxy (September 10, 2014)
- Average home league attendance: 17,421
Home colours	Away colours	Third colours

The 2014 Montreal Impact season was the club's third season Major League Soccer, the top flight of both American and Canadian soccer.

For the 2014 season, outside of MLS, the Impact competed in the 2014 Canadian Championship, Canada's domestic cup competition and the CONCACAF Champions League.

== Background ==
Alessandro Nesta retired after last season. Options were declined for Paolo DelPiccolo, Maximiliano Leonel Rodríguez, and Siniša Ubiparipović. Zarek Valentin left on a free transfer to FK Bodø/Glimt. Nelson Rivas became a free agent. Loans ended for Andrés Romero, Daniele Paponi, and Andrea Pisanu. Davy Arnaud was traded for an international roster slot in 2014 and 2015. Marco Schallibaum was fired as head coach. Frank Klopas replaced Schallibaum. Montreal opened pre–season training camp on January 28 and will participate in the Walt Disney World Pro Soccer Classic.

=== Transfers ===
==== In ====
No.	Pos.	Player	Transferred from	Fee/notes	Date	Source
3	DF	(United States) Eric Miller	(United States) Creighton Bluejays	2014 MLS SuperDraft	January 16, 2014	
29	FW	(Uruguay) Santiago González	(Uruguay) Sud América	Free Transfer	February 14, 2014	
44	DF	(United States) Heath Pearce	(United States) New York Red Bulls	Free	March 6, 2014	
99	FW	(United States) Jack McInerney	(United States) Philadelphia Union	Traded for Andrew Wenger	April 4, 2014	
17	MF	(Canada) Issey Nakajima-Farran	(Canada) Toronto FC	Traded for Collen Warner	May 16, 2014	
98	DF	(The Gambia) Mamadou Danso	(United States) Portland Timbers	Traded for a 2nd-round pick in 2015	June 2, 2014	
22	DF	(Haiti) Mechack Jérôme	(United States) Sporting Kansas City	Free Transfer	June 6, 2014	
33	MF	(Spain) Gorka Larrea	(Spain) CD Numancia	Free	June 11, 2014	
23	DF	(Poland) Krzysztof Król	(Poland) Piast Gliwice	Free	June 26, 2014	
10	MF	(Argentina) Ignacio Piatti	(Argentina) San Lorenzo de Almagro	Free	July 2, 2014	
28	MF	(Canada) Jérémy Gagnon-Laparé	(Canada) Montreal Impact Academy	Graduated from the academy	July 3, 2014	
11	MF	(United States) Dilly Duka	(United States) Chicago Fire	Traded for Sanna Nyassi	July 29, 2014	
24	FW	(Canada) Anthony Jackson-Hamel	(Canada) Montreal Impact Academy	Graduated from the academy	August 1, 2014	
14	DF	(Nigeria) Gege Soriola	(South Africa) Free State Stars F.C.	Free	August 26, 2014	
27	MF	(Canada) Louis Béland-Goyette	(Canada) Montreal Impact Academy	Graduated from the academy	September 12, 2014	
25	MF	(Ghana) James Bissue	(Ghana) Sekondi Wise Fighters	Free Transfer	September 18, 2014	

==== Out ====
No.	Pos.	Player	Transferred to	Fee/notes	Date	Source
14	DF	(Italy) Alessandro Nesta	Retired		November 7, 2013	
27	MF	(United States) Paolo DelPiccolo	(United States) New England Revolution	Option Declined	November 25, 2013	
98	MF	(Argentina) Maximiliano Rodríguez	(Argentina) Argentinos Juniors	Option Declined	November 25, 2013	
28	MF	(Bosnia and Herzegovina) Siniša Ubiparipović	(Canada) Ottawa Fury FC	Option Declined	December 9, 2013	
22	MF	(United States) Davy Arnaud	(United States) D.C. United	Traded for an international roster slot in 2014 and 2015	December 10, 2013	
3	DF	(United States) Zarek Valentin	(Norway) FK Bodø/Glimt	Free Transfer	December 19, 2013	
35	FW	(Italy) Daniele Paponi	(Italy) Bologna F.C. 1909	Loan Ended	December 19, 2013	
31	MF	(Italy) Andrea Pisanu	(Italy) A.C. Prato	Loan Ended	December 19, 2013	
33	FW	(United States) Andrew Wenger	(United States) Philadelphia Union	Traded for Jack McInerney	April 4, 2014	
18	MF	(United States) Collen Warner	(Canada) Toronto FC	Traded for Issey Nakajima-Farran	May 16, 2014	
5	DF	(United States) Jeb Brovsky	(United States) New York City FC	Traded for a second-round pick in 2016	June 12, 2014	
2	DF	(Colombia) Nelson Rivas	(Colombia) Fortaleza F.C.	Removed from the roster	June 24, 2014	
22	DF	(Haiti) Mechack Jérôme	(United States) San Antonio Scorpions	Released	June 26, 2014	
23	MF	(Argentina) Hernán Bernardello	(Mexico) Cruz Azul	Option Declined	July 2, 2014	
11	MF	(The Gambia) Sanna Nyassi	(United States) Chicago Fire	Traded for Dilly Duka	July 29, 2014	

==== Loans in ====
No.	Pos.	Player	Loaned from	Loan Start Date	Loan End Date	Source
15	FW	(Argentina) Andrés Romero	(Brazil) Tombense	February 10, 2014	December 31, 2014	

==== Loans out ====
No.	Pos.	Player	Loaned to	Loan Start Date	Loan End Date	Source
43	MF	(Canada) Zakaria Messoudi	(Canada) Ottawa Fury FC	March 28, 2014	November 2, 2014	
19	MF	(United States) Blake Smith	(United States) Indy Eleven	May 14, 2014	November 2, 2014	
29	FW	(Uruguay) Santiago González	(Uruguay) Danubio F.C.	August 1, 2014	December 31, 2014	

== International caps ==
Players called for senior international duty during the 2014 season while under contract with the Montreal Impact.

Nationality	Position	Player	Competition	Date	Opponent	Minutes played	Score
Canada	MF	Jérémy Gagnon-Laparé	Friendly	May 23, 2014	v Bulgaria	22'	1-1
Canada	MF	Jérémy Gagnon-Laparé	Friendly	May 27, 2014	v Moldova	90'	1-1
Canada	MF	Patrice Bernier	Friendly	September 9, 2014	v Jamaica	45'	3–1
Canada	MF	Issey Nakajima-Farran	Friendly	September 9, 2014	v Jamaica	56'	3–1
Canada	MF	Karl Ouimette	Friendly	September 9, 2014	v Jamaica	2'	3–1
Canada	MF	Issey Nakajima-Farran	Friendly	October 14, 2014	v Colombia	89'	0–1
Canada	DF	Karl Ouimette	Friendly	October 14, 2014	v Colombia	13'	0–1
Canada	MF	Jérémy Gagnon-Laparé	Friendly	October 14, 2014	v Colombia	22'	0–1
Canada	DF	Karl Ouimette	Friendly	November 18, 2014	v Panama	90'	0-0
Canada	MF	Issey Nakajima-Farran	Friendly	November 18, 2014	v Panama	62'	0-0
Canada	MF	Patrice Bernier	Friendly	November 18, 2014	v Panama	62'	0-0

== Competitions ==
=== Pre-season matches ===
==== Walt Disney World Pro Soccer Classic ====
February 19, 2014	Montreal Impact	1–0	Fluminense FC U23	Lake Buena Vista, Florida
20:00	Nyassi 18'	Report		Stadium: ESPN Wide World of Sports Complex

February 22, 2014	Montreal Impact	0–3	New York Red Bulls	Lake Buena Vista, Florida
18:00			Miller 45'; Bover 68'; Wright-Phillips 69'	Stadium: ESPN Wide World of Sports Complex

February 26, 2014	Sporting Kansas City	3–2	Montreal Impact	Lake Buena Vista, Florida
20:00	Dwyer 9' (pen.), 43' (yellow card) 58'; Myers (yellow card) 53'; Zizzo 75'	Report	Nyassi 1'; Felipe 30' (pen.); Bernardello (yellow card) 55'; Tissot (yellow card) 77'	Stadium: ESPN Wide World of Sports Complex

March 1, 2014 5th place match	Philadelphia Union	1–1 (4–1 p)	Montreal Impact	Lake Buena Vista, Florida
15:00	McInerney 29'	Report	Di Vaio 80'	Stadium: ESPN Wide World of Sports Complex
	Penalties
	Fernandes (penalty scored); Wheeler (penalty scored); Carroll (penalty scored); Nogueira (penalty scored)		(penalty missed) Di Vaio; (penalty missed) Bernier; (penalty scored) Bernardello

=== Major League Soccer ===
==== Review ====
The Montreal Impact started their season on March 8 against FC Dallas with a 3–2 loss. Sanna Nyassi and Andrew Wenger scored for Montreal and Fabián Castillo, Blas Pérez, and Mauro Díaz scored for Dallas. Marco Di Vaio and Andrés Romero are suspended for the first 3 matches of the season. Montreal went on to face Houston Dynamo on March 2. Houston won 1–0 from a deflected shot by Will Bruin. Patrice Bernier had a 30–yard shot "pushed" over the crossbar and Andrew Wenger had a shot cleared over the crossbar.

==== Table ====
===== Conference =====
Pos	Team	Pld	W	L	T	GF	GA	GD	Pts	Qualification
1	D.C. United	34	17	9	8	52	37	+15	59	Qualification for the conference semifinals
2	New England Revolution	34	17	13	4	51	37	+14	55	Qualification for the conference semifinals
3	Columbus Crew SC	34	14	10	10	52	42	+10	52	Qualification for the conference semifinals
4	New York Red Bulls	34	13	10	11	55	50	+5	50	Qualification for the knockout round
5	Sporting Kansas City	34	14	13	7	48	41	+7	49	Qualification for the knockout round
6	Philadelphia Union	34	10	12	12	51	51	0	42	
7	Toronto FC	34	11	15	8	44	54	−10	41	
8	Houston Dynamo	34	11	17	6	39	58	−19	39	
9	Chicago Fire	34	6	10	18	41	51	−10	36	
10	Montreal Impact	34	6	18	10	38	58	−20	28	

Source: MLS

===== Overall =====
Pos	Team	Pld	W	L	T	GF	GA	GD	Pts	Qualification
1	Seattle Sounders FC (S, U)	34	20	10	4	65	50	+15	64	Qualification for the CONCACAF Champions League
2	LA Galaxy (C)	34	17	7	10	69	37	+32	61	Qualification for the CONCACAF Champions League
3	D.C. United	34	17	9	8	52	37	+15	59	Qualification for the CONCACAF Champions League
4	Real Salt Lake	34	15	8	11	54	39	+15	56	Qualification for the CONCACAF Champions League
5	New England Revolution	34	17	13	4	51	46	+5	55	
6	FC Dallas	34	16	12	6	55	45	+10	54	
7	Columbus Crew	34	14	10	10	52	42	+10	52	
8	New York Red Bulls	34	13	10	11	55	50	+5	50	
9	Vancouver Whitecaps FC	34	12	8	14	42	40	+2	50	Qualification for the CONCACAF Champions League
10	Sporting Kansas City	34	14	13	7	48	41	+7	49	
11	Portland Timbers	34	12	9	13	61	52	+9	49	
12	Philadelphia Union	34	10	12	12	51	51	0	42	
13	Toronto FC	34	11	15	8	44	54	−10	41	
14	Houston Dynamo	34	11	17	6	39	58	−19	39	
15	Chicago Fire	34	6	10	18	41	51	−10	36	
16	Chivas USA	34	9	19	6	29	61	−32	33	
17	Colorado Rapids	34	8	18	8	43	62	−19	32	
18	San Jose Earthquakes	34	6	16	12	35	50	−15	30	
19	Montreal Impact (V)	34	6	18	10	38	58	−20	28	

Source: MLS
Rules for classification: 1) points; 2) head-to-head record; 3) goal difference; 4) number of goals scored
(C) MLS Cup champions; (S) Supporters' Shield winners; (U) U.S. Open Cup winners; (V) Canadian Championship winners

==== Results summary ====
Overall								Home						Away					
Pld	Pts	W	L	D	GF	GA	GD	W	L	D	GF	GA	GD	W	L	D	GF	GA	GD
34	28	6	18	10	38	58	−20	6	6	5	24	24	0	0	12	5	14	34	−20

Last updated: October 26, 2014
Source: 2014 Major League Soccer season
Pld = Matches played; Pts = Points; W = Matches won; D = Matches drawn; L = Matches lost; GF = Goals for; GA = Goals against; GD = Goal difference

==== Fixtures & results ====
Win Draw Loss

MD	Date, KO EST	Venue	Opponent	Res. F–A	Att.	Goalscorers and disciplined players		Ref.
MD	Date, KO EST	Venue	Opponent	Res. F–A	Att.	Montreal Impact	Opponent	Ref.
1	March 8, 8:30 p.m.	A	FC Dallas	2–3	18,011	Nyassi 10' (yellow card) 60'; Ferrari (yellow card) 17'; Wenger 65'	Castillo 16'; Hernandez (yellow card) 19'; Pérez 24'; Díaz 47' (yellow card) 50'	
2	March 15, 8:30 p.m.	A	Houston Dynamo	0–1	18,245	Felipe (yellow card) 59'; Camara (yellow card) 77'; Bernardello (yellow card) 78'	Sarkodie (yellow card) 35'; Bruin 40'; Taylor (yellow card) 52'	
3	March 23, 4:00 p.m. weather delay from March 22, 4:00 p.m.	H	Seattle Sounders FC	0–2	27,207	Camara (yellow card) 45+2'	Perkins 8' (o.g.); Martins 58'	
4	March 29, 4:00 p.m.	A	Philadelphia Union	1–1	15,691	Camara (yellow card) 26'; Wenger (red card) 76'; Di Vaio 80'	Nogueira 35'; Fabinho (yellow card) 48'	
5	April 5, 4:00 p.m.	H	New York Red Bulls	2–2	24,071	Romero 5'; Felipe 59'	Steele 31'; Luyindula 34'	
6	April 12, 4:00 p.m.	H	Chicago Fire	1–1	19,313	McInerney 43'; Camara (yellow card) 90+2'	Nyarko (yellow card) 44'; Amarikwa 54'; Magee (yellow card) 66'	
7	April 19, 8:30 p.m.	A	Sporting Kansas City	0–4	20,306	Mapp (yellow card) 38'; Ferrari (yellow card) 52'; Ouimette (yellow card) 73'; Mallace (yellow card) 80'	Mallace 31' (o.g.); Collin 71'; Dwyer 74' 86'; Peterson (yellow card) 89'	
8	April 26, 4:00 p.m.	H	Philadelphia Union	1–0	19,075	Felipe 14'; Ouimette (yellow card) 16'; Camara (yellow card) 37'; Brovsky (yellow card) 40'	Edu (yellow card) 2'; Gaddis (yellow card) 84'	
9	May 10, 4:00 p.m.	H	Sporting Kansas City	0–3	16,529	Warner (red card) 17'; Bernardello (yellow card) 38'	Dom Dwyer 18' (pen.) 64'; Nagamura 34'	
10	May 17, 7:00 p.m.	A	D.C. United	1–1	14,106	McInerney 56'; Bernardello (yellow card) 67'; Bernier (yellow card) 90+2'	DeLeon (yellow card) 77'; Johnson 84'; Neal (yellow card) 85'	
11	May 24, 9:00 p.m.	A	Colorado Rapids	1–4	17,616	Lefèvre (yellow card) 40'; Romero 88'	Powers 5' (pen.) 84'; Hill 54'; O'Neill 58' (yellow card) 90+2'; Moor (yellow card) 72'	
12	May 31, 7:00 p.m.	H	New England Revolution	2–0	18.068	Romero 3'; McInerney 38'; Felipe (yellow card) 63'	Dorman (yellow card) 40'; Bunbury (yellow card) 76'	
13	June 11, 7:30 p.m.	H	D.C. United	2–4	14,135	McInerney 12'; Romero 21' (yellow card) 25'; Lefèvre (yellow card) 81'	Silva 6' 39' 45+5' (pen.); DeLeon 23'; Espíndola (yellow card) 33'; Arnaud (yellow card) 87'	
14	June 25, 10:00 p.m.	A	Vancouver Whitecaps FC	0–0	21,000	Tissot (yellow card) 10'; Romero (yellow card) 33'; Larrea (yellow card) 74'	Mitchell (yellow card) 82'; Koffie (yellow card) 90+3'	
15	June 29, 7:30 p.m.	H	Houston Dynamo	3–0	16,752	Tissot (yellow card) 22'; McInerney 41' 75'; Di Vaio 79'	Cochran (yellow card) 16'; Bruin (yellow card) 52'	
16	July 5, 10:30 p.m.	A	Chivas USA	0–1	4,201	Ouimette (yellow card) 70'	Torres 90+4'	
17	July 12, 7:30 p.m.	H	Sporting Kansas City	1–2	17,155	Di Vaio 28' (yellow card) 90+2'; Felipe (yellow card) 31'; Romero (yellow card) 41'; Król (yellow card) 64'	Dwyer 4' 89'; Sinovic (yellow card) 32'	
18	July 19, 7:30 p.m.	A	Columbus Crew	1–2	21,112	Di Vaio 35'; Camara (yellow card) 70'	Anor 56' 75'	
19	July 24, 10:00 p.m.	A	Real Salt Lake	1–3	20,398	Camara 31'; Nakajima-Farran (red card) 65'; Gagnon-Laparé (yellow card) 82'	Mulholland 3'; Wingert (yellow card) 18'; García 70' 90+3'	
20	July 27, 7:30 p.m.	H	Portland Timbers	2–3	14,715	Romero 13'; Camara (yellow card) 32'; Bernier (yellow card) 42'; Tissot 44'	Urruti 34'; Johnson 40' (pen.); Valeri 82'	
21	August 2, 5:00 p.m.	H	Toronto FC	0–2	16,665	Król (yellow card) 32'; Ferrari (yellow card) 52'; Camara (yellow card) 77'	Gilberto 11'; Moore 54'	
22	August 9, 7:00 p.m.	A	Philadelphia Union	1–2	18,703	Tissot 79'	Le Toux 12' 63'	
23	August 16, 6:30 p.m.	H	Chicago Fire	1–0	17,132	Larrea (yellow card) 70'; Di Vaio 84'	Ianni (yellow card) 24'	
24	August 23, 7:00 p.m.	A	New York Red Bulls	2–4	17,891	Duka 37'; Romero 79'	Henry 53' 67'; Wright-Phillips 74' 90'	
25	August 30, 7:30 p.m.	H	Columbus Crew	2–0	15,995	Piatti (yellow card) 32' (goal) 40' 90+5'; Camara (yellow card) 64'; Bush (yellow card) 69'	Tchani (yellow card) 34'; Trapp (yellow card) 81'; Francis (yellow card) 85'	
26	September 6, 8:30 p.m.	A	Houston Dynamo	2–3	18,501	Duka 40'; Piatti 55'; Felipe (yellow card) 71'	Barnes 30' 62'; Clark 65'	
27	September 10, 7:30 p.m.	H	Los Angeles Galaxy	2–2	13,916	Di Vaio 28'; Piatti 43' (yellow card) 53'; Felipe (yellow card) 80'; Mallace (yellow card) 87'	Gargan (yellow card) 37'; Donovan (yellow card) 44'; Zardes 59'; Gordon 64'	
28	September 13, 7:30 p.m.	A	New England Revolution	1–2	19,665	Mallace 13'; Król (yellow card) 47' (yellow-red card) 62'; Lefèvre (yellow card) 65'	Farrell (yellow card) 17'; Rowe 23'; Nguyen 25'; Bunbury (yellow card) 48'	
29	September 20, 7:30 p.m.	H	San Jose Earthquakes	2–0	15,800	McInerney 81'; Duka 88'		
30	September 27, 7:30 p.m.	A	Columbus Crew	0–2	20,318	Gagnon-Laparé (yellow card) 56'; Ferrari (yellow card) 77'	Finlay 2' (yellow card) 67'; Tchani (yellow card) 49'; Higuaín 58' (pen.); Wahl (yellow card) 63'	
31	October 5, 5:00 p.m.	A	Chicago Fire	0–0	17,915	Camara (yellow card) 65'	Segares (yellow card) 88'	
32	October 11, 4:00 p.m.	H	New England Revolution	2–2	14,389	Di Vaio 12' 39'	Rowe 16'; Jones (yellow card) 47'; Nguyen 69'	
33	October 18, 2:00 p.m.	A	Toronto FC	1–1	18,329	Camara (yellow card) 5' (yellow-red card) 90+5'; Felipe 39'; Ferrari (yellow card) 55'; Pearce (red card) 82'; Bush (yellow card) 90'	Creavalle 20'; Jackson (yellow card) 88'; Osorio (red card) 90+3'; Bendik (yellow card) 90+4'; De Rosario (yellow card) 90+5'	
34	October 25, 4:00 p.m.	H	D.C. United	1–1	15,242	Di Vaio 26'; Mallace (yellow card) 40'>	Espíndola 86'	

=== MLS Reserve league ===
==== Reserve fixtures & results ====
Win Draw Loss

MD	Date – KO EST	Venue	Opponent	Res. F–A	Att.	Goalscorers and disciplined players		Ref.
MD	Date – KO EST	Venue	Opponent	Res. F–A	Att.	Montreal Impact	Opponent	Ref.
1	March 9 – 11:30 a.m.	A	FC Dallas	0–2		Romero (yellow card) 10'; Ouimette (yellow card) 51'	Escobar 45'; Keel 52'	
2	April 6 – 10:30 a.m.	H	New York Red Bulls	4–1		Jackson-Hamel 16' 30' 87'; Mallace (yellow card) 16'; Bernier 19'; Lefèvre (yellow card) 22'; Brovsky (yellow card) 90+3'	Adjei (yellow card) 18'; Bustamante 55' (pen.)	
3	June 7 – 7:30 p.m.	A	Orlando City Soccer Club	1–2		Carbonneau (yellow card) 31'; Tissot (yellow card) 74' (goal) 75'; Béland-Goyette (yellow card) 84'	Span 12' 60'	
4	June 20 – 4:00 p.m.	H	Harrisburg City Islanders	1−0		Felipe 19'; Romero (yellow card) 44'; Joly (yellow card) 59'; López (yellow card) 70'	Barril (yellow card) 62'	
5	July 6 – 2:00 p.m.	A	Chivas USA	1–0		Danso 23' (pen.); Larrea (yellow card) 77'; Mallace (yellow card) 90'	Dunn (yellow card) 48'; Nwiloh (yellow card) 70'	
6	July 28 – 10:30 a.m.	H	Charleston Battery	0–1		Gagnon-Laparé (yellow card) 11'	Falvey 20'; Cuevas (yellow card) 26'	
7	Postponed	H	Chicago Fire					
8	Postponed	A	New York Red Bulls					
9	September 1 – 7:00 p.m.	H	Charlotte Eagles	1-1		Tissot 5'	Herrera 10'	
10	October 6 – 11:00 a.m.	A	Chicago Fire	0–1			Jobe 28'	

== Canadian championship ==
=== Bracket ===
The three Major League Soccer and two NASL Canadian clubs have been seeded according to their final position in 2013 league play, with both NASL clubs playing in the preliminary round, the winner of which advances to the semifinals.

All rounds of the competition are played via a two leg home and away knock-out format. The higher seeded team has the option of deciding which leg it plays at home, usually the second leg. The team which scores the greater aggregate of goals in the two matches advances. As previous years, the team that comes on top on aggregate for the two matches is declared champion and earns the right to represent Canada in the 2014–15 CONCACAF Champions League.

Each round is a two-game aggregate goal series with the away goals rule.

Preliminary round
Ottawa Fury FC	0	1	1
FC Edmonton	0	3	3

Semifinals

Semifinals
1	Montreal Impact	1	4	5
4	FC Edmonton	2	2	4
2	Vancouver Whitecaps FC	1	2	3 (3)
3	Toronto FC (p)	2	1	3 (5)

Final
1	Montreal Impact	1	1	2
3	Toronto FC	1	0	1

=== Fixtures and results ===
Win Draw Loss

Leg	Date – KO EST	Venue	Opponent	Res. F–A	Agg. score F–A	Att.	Goalscorers and disciplined player		Ref.
Leg	Date – KO EST	Venue	Opponent	Res. F–A	Agg. score F–A	Att.	Montreal Impact	Opponent	Ref.
Semi–final
FL	May 7 – 9:30 p.m.	A	FC Edmonton	1–2	—	1,946	Camara (yellow card) 41'; McInerney 56'; Pearce (yellow card) 82'	Jones (yellow card) 45'; Moses (yellow card) 56'; Ameobi 60'; Nonni 90+1'	
SL	May 14 – 7:30 p.m.	H	FC Edmonton	4–2	5–4	12,826	McInerney 10'; McInerney 17'; Brovsky 47'; Bernier 90+7'	Edward (yellow card) 45+3'; Jonke 67'; Jonke 70'; Boakai (yellow card) 79'; Hlavaty (yellow card) 90+6'	
Final
FL	May 28 – 7:30 p.m.	A	Toronto FC	1-1	—	18,269	Mapp 73'; Lefèvre (yellow card) 83'	Henry 20'; Rey (yellow card) 35'	
SL	June 4 – 7:30 p.m.	H	Toronto FC	1–0	2–1	13,423	Bernardello (yellow card) 4'; Felipe 90+1' (yellow card) 90+2'		

== CONCACAF Champions League ==
=== Group stage ===
Pos	Team	Pld	W	D	L	GF	GA	GD	Pts	Qualification	MTL	NYR	FAS
1	(Canada) Montreal Impact	4	3	1	0	6	3	+3	10	Advance to championship stage	—	1–0	1–0
2	(United States) New York Red Bulls	4	1	2	1	3	2	+1	5		1–1	—	2–0
3	(El Salvador) FAS	4	0	1	3	2	6	−4	1		2–3	0–0	—

Source: CONCACAF
Rules for classification: Group stage tiebreakers

Win Draw Loss

MD	Date – KO EST	Venue	Opponent	Res. F–A	Att.	Goalscorers and disciplined players		Ref.
MD	Date – KO EST	Venue	Opponent	Res. F–A	Att.	Montreal Impact	Opponent	Ref.
1	August 5 – 8:00 p.m.	H	C.D. FAS	1–0	9,209	Di Vaio 21' (yellow card) 77'; Larrea (yellow card) 30'; Król (yellow card) 53'; Camara (red card) 72'	Blanco (yellow card) 43'; Mendoza (yellow card) 77'	
2	August 20 – 10:00 p.m.	A	C.D. FAS	3–2		Romero 7'; Di Vaio 8' 60' (pen.); Ferrari (yellow card) 62'; Felipe (yellow card) 73' (yellow-red card) 73'; Nakajima-Farran (yellow card) 82'; Król (yellow card) 87'	Morán 33'; Teruel 51' (pen.) (yellow card) 83'	
3	September 17 – 8:00 p.m.	H	New York Red Bulls	1–0		Di Vaio 16' (yellow card) 74'; Ferrari (yellow card) 26'; Romero (yellow card) 69'	Perrinelle (yellow card) 21'; Lade (yellow card) 70' (yellow-red card) 76'	
4	October 22 – 8:00 p.m.	A	New York Red Bulls	1-1		McInerney 71'; Gagnon-Laparé (yellow card) 89'	Lade 85'	

== Player information ==
=== Squad information ===
No.	Name	Nationality	Position	Date of birth (age At Year End)	Previous club
Goalkeepers
1	Troy Perkins	USA	GK	July 29, 1981 (age 45)	(United States) Portland Timbers
30	Evan Bush	USA	GK	March 6, 1986 (age 40)	(Canada) Montreal Impact (NASL)
40	Maxime Crépeau	CAN	GK	May 11, 1994 (age 32)	(Canada) Montreal Impact Academy
Defenders
3	Eric Miller	USA	LB\RB	January 15, 1993 (age 33)	(United States) Creighton Bluejays
5	Gege Soriola	(Nigeria) NIG	CB\RB	November 21, 1988 (age 37)	(South Africa) Free State Stars F.C.
6	Hassoun Camara	FRA	CB\RB	February 3, 1984 (age 42)	(Canada) Montreal Impact (NASL)
13	Matteo Ferrari	ITA	CB	December 5, 1979 (age 46)	(Turkey) Beşiktaş J.K.
23	Krzysztof Król	POL	LB	February 6, 1987 (age 39)	(Poland) Piast Gliwice
26	Adrián López Rodríguez	(Spain) SPA	CB	February 25, 1987 (age 39)	(England) Wigan Athletic F.C.
34	Karl Ouimette	CAN	CB\LB	June 18, 1992 (age 34)	(Canada) Montreal Impact Academy
44	Heath Pearce	USA	CB\LB	August 13, 1984 (age 42)	(United States) New York Red Bulls
51	Maxim Tissot	CAN	LB	April 13, 1992 (age 34)	(Canada) Montreal Impact Academy
55	Wandrille Lefèvre	FRA	CB	December 17, 1989 (age 36)	(Canada) Montreal Impact Academy
98	Mamadou Danso	GAM	CB	April 27, 1983 (age 43)	(United States) Portland Timbers
Midfielders
7	Felipe Martins	BRA	AM	September 30, 1990 (age 36)	(Switzerland) FC Lugano
8	Patrice Bernier	CAN	DM	September 23, 1979 (age 47)	(Denmark) Lyngby Boldklub
10	Ignacio Piatti	ARG	AM	February 4, 1985 (age 41)	(Argentina) San Lorenzo de Almagro
11	Dilly Duka	USA	AM	September 15, 1989 (age 37)	(United States) Chicago Fire
16	Calum Mallace	SCO	DM	October 1, 1990 (age 36)	(United States) Marquette Golden Eagles
17	Issey Nakajima-Farran	CAN	RM	May 16, 1984 (age 42)	(Canada) Toronto FC
19	Blake Smith	USA	LM	January 17, 1991 (age 35)	(United States) New Mexico Lobos
21	Justin Mapp	USA	LM/CM	October 18, 1984 (age 42)	(United States) Philadelphia Union
25	James Bissue	(Ghana) GHA	AM	June 16, 1991 (age 35)	(Ghana) Sekondi Wise Fighters
27	Louis Béland-Goyette	CAN	AM	September 15, 1995 (age 31)	(Canada) Montreal Impact Academy
28	Jérémy Gagnon-Laparé	CAN	DM	March 9, 1995 (age 31)	(Canada) Montreal Impact Academy
33	Gorka Larrea	(Spain) SPA	DM	April 7, 1984 (age 42)	(Spain) CD Numancia
43	Zakaria Messoudi	CAN	AM	October 30, 1993 (age 33)	(Canada) Montreal Impact Academy
Attackers
9	Marco Di Vaio	ITA	ST	July 15, 1976 (age 50)	(Italy) Bologna
15	Andrés Romero	ARG	ST	October 29, 1989 (age 37)	(Brazil) Tombense
24	Anthony Jackson-Hamel	CAN	ST	August 3, 1993 (age 33)	(Canada) Montreal Impact Academy
29	Santiago González	URU	ST	June 11, 1992 (age 34)	(Uruguay) Sud América
99	Jack McInerney	USA	ST	August 5, 1992 (age 34)	(United States) Philadelphia Union

=== Squad and statistics ===
==== Appearances, minutes played, and goals scored ====
No.	Nat.	Player	Total			Major League Soccer			Canadian Championship			CONCACAF Champions League			Ref.
No.	Nat.	Player	App.	Min.	Gls	App.	Min.	Gls	App.	Min.	Gls	App.	Min.	Gls	Ref.
Goalkeepers
1	(United States)	Troy Perkins	21	1890	0	21	1890	0	0	0	0	0	0	0	
30	(United States)	Evan Bush	21	1890	0	13	1170	0	4	360	0	4	360	0	
40	(Canada)	Maxime Crépeau	0	0	0	0	0	0	0	0	0	0	0	0	
Defenders
3	(United States)	Eric Miller	22	1736	0	21	1646	0	0	0	0	1	90	0	
5	(Nigeria)	Gege Soriola	0	0	0	0	0	0	0	0	0	0	0	0	
6	(France)	Hassoun Camara	35	2977	1	28	2365	1	4	360	0	3	252	0	
13	(Italy)	Matteo Ferrari	29	2508	0	25	2148	0	0	0	0	4	360	0	
23	(Poland)	Krzysztof Król	14	1200	0	11	930	0	0	0	0	3	270	0	
26	(Spain)	Adrián López Rodríguez	0	0	0	0	0	0	0	0	0	0	0	0	
34	(Canada)	Karl Ouimette	17	1355	0	11	834	0	4	360	0	2	161	0	
44	(United States)	Heath Pearce	29	2362	0	23	1822	0	4	360	0	2	180	0	
51	(Canada)	Maxim Tissot	26	922	2	20	762	2	3	93	0	3	67	0	
55	(France)	Wandrille Lefèvre	20	1508	0	15	1220	0	2	177	0	3	111	0	
98	(The Gambia)	Mamadou Danso	3	231	0	3	231	0	0	0	0	0	0	0	
Midfielders
7	(Brazil)	Felipe	37	2768	4	31	2456	3	3	149	1	3	163	0	
8	Canada	Patrice Bernier	33	2360	1	26	1802	0	4	351	1	3	207	0	
10	Argentina	Ignacio Piatti	8	621	4	6	450	4	0	0	0	2	171	0	
11	United States	Dilly Duka	18	1278	3	14	1023	3	0	0	0	3	255	0	
16	(Scotland)	Calum Mallace	29	1457	1	23	1122	1	3	110	0	3	225	0	
17	(Canada)	Issey Nakajima-Farran	14	637	0	13	540	0	0	0	0	2	97	0	
19	(United States)	Blake Smith	4	117	0	3	43	0	1	74	0	0	0	0	
21	(United States)	Justin Mapp	27	2035	1	23	1726	0	3	240	1	1	69	0	
25	(Ghana)	James Bissue	0	0	0	0	0	0	0	0	0	0	0	0	
27	(Canada)	Louis Béland-Goyette	1	15	0	1	15	0	0	0	0	0	0	0	
28	(Canada)	Jérémy Gagnon-Laparé	8	377	0	5	270	0	1	4	0	2	103	0	
33	(Spain)	Gorka Larrea	10	518	0	9	428	0	0	0	0	1	90	0	
43	(Canada)	Zakaria Messoudi	0	0	0	0	0	0	0	0	0	0	0	0	
Forwards
9	(Italy)	Marco Di Vaio	31	2167	13	26	1739	9	2	180	0	3	248	4	
15	(Argentina)	Andrés Romero	36	2718	7	29	2185	6	3	186	0	4	347	1	
24	(Canada)	Anthony Jackson-Hamel	5	133	0	4	132	0	0	0	0	1	1	0	
29	(Uruguay)	Santiago González	11	112	0	9	80	0	2	32	0	0	0	0	
99	(United States)	Jack McInerney	32	2201	11	26	1804	7	4	299	3	2	98	1	
No Longer with the Club
2	(Colombia)	Nelson Rivas	1	3	0	0	0	0	1	3	0	0	0	0	
5	(United States)	Jeb Brovsky	8	678	1	7	596	0	1	82	1	0	0	0	
11	(The Gambia)	Sanna Nyassi	6	402	1	4	243	1	2	159	0	0	0	0	
18	(United States)	Collen Warner	10	768	0	9	678	0	1	90	0	0	0	0	
22	(Haiti)	Mechack Jérôme	0	0	0	0	0	0	0	0	0	0	0	0	
23	(Argentina)	Hernán Bernardello	14	1137	0	10	844	0	4	293	0	0	0	0	
33	(United States)	Andrew Wenger	4	286	1	4	286	1	0	0	0	0	0	0	
Last updated: October 25, 2014

==== Multi–goal games ====
No.	Pos.	Player	Date	Opponent	Number of Goals	Source
99	FW	(United States) Jack McInerney	May 14, 2014	vs FC Edmonton	2	
99	FW	(United States) Jack McInerney	June 29, 2014	vs Houston Dynamo	2	
9	FW	(Italy) Marco Di Vaio	August 20, 2014	vs C.D. FAS	2	
10	MF	(Argentina) Ignacio Piatti	August 30, 2014	vs Columbus Crew	2	
9	FW	(Italy) Marco Di Vaio	October 11, 2014	vs New England Revolution	2	

==== Goals against average ====
No.	Nat.	Player	Total			Major League Soccer			Canadian Championship			CONCACAF Champions League		
No.	Nat.	Player	MIN	GA	GAA	MIN	GA	GAA	MIN	GA	GAA	MIN	GA	GAA
1	USA	Troy Perkins	1890	35	1.67	1890	35	1.67	0	0	0.00	0	0	0.00
30	USA	Evan Bush	1890	31	1.48	1170	23	1.77	360	5	1.25	360	3	0.75
40	CAN	Maxime Crépeau	0	0	0.00	0	0	0.00	0	0	0.00	0	0	0.00

Updated to match played October 23, 2014
Source: Montreal Impact

=== Top scorers ===
No.	Nat.	Player	Pos.	Major League Soccer	Canadian Championship	CONCACAF Champions League	TOTAL
9	(Italy)	Marco Di Vaio	FW	9		4	13
99	(United States)	Jack McInerney	FW	7	3	1	11
15	(Argentina)	Andrés Romero	FW	6		1	7
7	(Brazil)	Felipe	MF	3	1		4
10	(Argentina)	Ignacio Piatti	MF	4			4
11	(United States)	Dilly Duka	MF	3			3
51	(Canada)	Maxim Tissot	DF	2			2
5	(United States)	Jeb Brovsky	DF		1		1
6	(France)	Hassoun Camara	DF	1			1
8	(Canada)	Patrice Bernier	MF		1		1
11	(The Gambia)	Sanna Nyassi	MF	1			1
16	(Scotland)	Calum Mallace	MF	1			1
21	(United States)	Justin Mapp	MF		1		1
33	(United States)	Andrew Wenger	FW	1			1
Totals				38	7	6	51

Updated to match played October 25, 2014
Source: Montreal Impact

Italic: denotes player left the club during the season.

=== Top assists ===
No.	Nat.	Player	Pos.	Major League Soccer	Canadian Championship	CONCACAF Champions League	TOTAL
21	(United States)	Justin Mapp	MF	8	2		10
7	(Brazil)	Felipe	MF	6		1	7
8	(Canada)	Patrice Bernier	MF	3	2		5
9	(Italy)	Marco Di Vaio	FW	4		1	5
15	(Argentina)	Andrés Romero	FW	3		1	4
10	(Argentina)	Ignacio Piatti	MF	1		2	3
11	(United States)	Dilly Duka	MF	3			3
16	(Scotland)	Calum Mallace	MF	3			3
1	(United States)	Troy Perkins	GK	1			1
3	(United States)	Eric Miller	DF	1			1
6	(France)	Hassoun Camara	DF	1			1
11	(The Gambia)	Sanna Nyassi	MF		1		1
23	(Argentina)	Hernán Bernardello	MF		1		1
23	(Poland)	Krzysztof Król	DF	1			1
55	(France)	Wandrille Lefèvre	DF	1			1
98	(The Gambia)	Mamadou Danso	DF	1			1
99	(United States)	Jack McInerney	FW	1			1
Totals				38	6	5	49

Updated to match played October 22, 2014
Source: Montreal Impact

Italic: denotes player left the club during the season.

=== Clean sheets ===
No.	Nat.	Player	Major League Soccer	Canadian Championship	CONCACAF Champions League	TOTAL
30	(United States)	Evan Bush	3	1	2	6
1	(United States)	Troy Perkins	5			5
Totals			8	1	2	11

Updated to match played October 5, 2014
Source: Montreal Impact

=== Own goals ===
No.	Nat.	Player	Pos.	Major League Soccer	Canadian Championship	CONCACAF Champions League	TOTAL
1	(United States)	Troy Perkins	GK	1			1
16	(Scotland)	Calum Mallace	MF	1			1
Totals				2	0	0	2

Updated to match played June 5, 2014
Source: Major League Soccer

=== Top minutes played ===
No.	Nat.	Player	Pos.	Major League Soccer	Canadian Championship	CONCACAF Champions League	TOTAL
6	(France)	Hassoun Camara	DF	2365	360	252	2977
7	(Brazil)	Felipe	MF	2456	149	163	2768
15	(Argentina)	Andrés Romero	FW	2185	186	347	2718
13	(Italy)	Matteo Ferrari	DF	2148		360	2508
44	(United States)	Heath Pearce	DF	1822	360	180	2362
8	(Canada)	Patrice Bernier	MF	1802	351	207	2360
99	(United States)	Jack McInerney	FW	1804	299	98	2201
9	(Italy)	Marco Di Vaio	FW	1739	180	248	2167
21	(United States)	Justin Mapp	MF	1726	240	69	2035
1	(United States)	Troy Perkins	GK	1890			1890
30	(United States)	Evan Bush	GK	1170	360	360	1890

Updated to match played October 25, 2014
Source: Montreal Impact

=== Discipline ===
==== Yellow and red cards ====
No.	Player	Total			Major League Soccer			Canadian Championship			CONCACAF Champions League			Ref.
No.	Player	Yellow card	(yellow card) (red card)	Red card	Yellow card	(yellow card) (red card)	Red card	Yellow card	(yellow card) (red card)	Red card	Yellow card	(yellow card) (red card)	Red card	Ref.
1	Troy Perkins	0	0	0	0	0	0	0	0	0	0	0	0	
3	Eric Miller	0	0	0	0	0	0	0	0	0	0	0	0	
5	Gege Soriola	0	0	0	0	0	0	0	0	0	0	0	0	
6	Hassoun Camara	12	1	1	11	1	0	1	0	0	0	0	1	
7	Felipe	7	1	0	5	0	0	1	0	0	1	1	0	
8	Patrice Bernier	2	0	0	2	0	0	0	0	0	0	0	0	
9	Marco Di Vaio	3	0	0	1	0	0	0	0	0	2	0	0	
10	Ignacio Piatti	2	0	0	2	0	0	0	0	0	0	0	0	
11	Dilly Duka	0	0	0	0	0	0	0	0	0	0	0	0	
13	Matteo Ferrari	8	0	0	6	0	0	0	0	0	2	0	0	
15	Andrés Romero	4	0	0	3	0	0	0	0	0	1	0	0	
16	Calum Mallace	2	0	0	2	0	0	0	0	0	0	0	0	
17	Issey Nakajima-Farran	1	0	1	0	0	1	0	0	0	1	0	0	
19	Blake Smith	0	0	0	0	0	0	0	0	0	0	0	0	
21	Justin Mapp	1	0	0	1	0	0	0	0	0	0	0	0	
23	Krzysztof Król	6	1	0	4	1	0	0	0	0	2	0	0	
24	Anthony Jackson-Hamel	0	0	0	0	0	0	0	0	0	0	0	0	
25	James Bissue	0	0	0	0	0	0	0	0	0	0	0	0	
26	Adrián López Rodríguez	0	0	0	0	0	0	0	0	0	0	0	0	
27	Louis Béland-Goyette	0	0	0	0	0	0	0	0	0	0	0	0	
28	Jérémy Gagnon-Laparé	3	0	0	2	0	0	0	0	0	1	0	0	
29	Santiago González	0	0	0	0	0	0	0	0	0	0	0	0	
30	Evan Bush	2	0	0	2	0	0	0	0	0	0	0	0	
33	Gorka Larrea	3	0	0	2	0	0	0	0	0	1	0	0	
34	Karl Ouimette	3	0	0	3	0	0	0	0	0	0	0	0	
40	Maxime Crépeau	0	0	0	0	0	0	0	0	0	0	0	0	
43	Zakaria Messoudi	0	0	0	0	0	0	0	0	0	0	0	0	
44	Heath Pearce	1	0	1	0	0	1	1	0	0	0	0	0	
51	Maxim Tissot	2	0	0	2	0	0	0	0	0	0	0	0	
55	Wandrille Lefèvre	4	0	0	3	0	0	1	0	0	0	0	0	
98	Mamadou Danso	0	0	0	0	0	0	0	0	0	0	0	0	
99	Jack McInerney	0	0	0	0	0	0	0	0	0	0	0	0	
2	Nelson Rivas	0	0	0	0	0	0	0	0	0	0	0	0	
5	Jeb Brovsky	1	0	0	1	0	0	0	0	0	0	0	0	
11	Sanna Nyassi	1	0	0	1	0	0	0	0	0	0	0	0	
18	Collen Warner	1	0	1	1	0	1	0	0	0	0	0	0	
23	Hernán Bernardello	4	0	0	3	0	0	1	0	0	0	0	0	
33	Andrew Wenger	0	0	1	0	0	1	0	0	0	0	0	0	
Totals		72	3	5	56	2	4	5	0	0	11	1	1	—
Last updated: October 22, 2014

==== Suspensions ====
No.	Pos.	Player	Date of Suspension	Length	Notes	Source
9	FW	(Italy) Marco Di Vaio	November 1, 2013	3 Games	Violent Conduct	
15	FW	(Argentina) Andrés Romero	November 1, 2013	3 Games	Violent Conduct	
33	FW	(United States) Andrew Wenger	March 29, 2014	1 Game	Red Card	
6	DF	(France) Hassoun Camara	April 26, 2014	1 Game	Yellow Card Accumulation	
18	MF	(United States) Collen Warner	May 10, 2014	1 Game	Red Card	
17	MF	(Canada) Issey Nakajima-Farran	July 24, 2014	1 Game	Red Card	
6	DF	(France) Hassoun Camara	August 2, 2014	1 Game	Yellow Card Accumulation	
6	DF	(France) Hassoun Camara	August 5, 2014	1 Game #	Red Card	
16	MF	(Scotland) Calum Mallace	August 13, 2014	1 Game	Leaving the bench	
7	MF	(Brazil) Felipe	August 20, 2014	1 Game #	Red Card	
6	DF	(France) Hassoun Camara	August 30, 2014	1 Game	Disc. Committee Decision	
7	MF	(Brazil) Felipe	September 10, 2014	1 Game	Yellow Card Accumulation	
23	DF	(Poland) Krzysztof Król	September 13, 2014	1 Game	Red Card	
9	FW	(Italy) Marco Di Vaio	September 17, 2014	1 Game #	Yellow Card Accumulation	
13	DF	(Italy) Matteo Ferrari	October 18, 2014	1 Game	Yellow Card Accumulation	
6	DF	(France) Hassoun Camara	October 18, 2014	1 Game	Red Card	
44	DF	(United States) Heath Pearce	October 18, 2014	1 Game	Yellow Card Accumulation	

1. (CONCACAF Match)

=== Other player information ===
==== International roster slots ====
Montreal has eleven MLS International Roster Slots for use in the 2014 season. Each club in Major League Soccer is allocated eight international roster spots and Montreal acquired the extra slots in trades with Colorado Rapids, Seattle Sounders FC and 2 from D.C. United. The Montreal Impact traded 1 of their slots to FC Dallas

Montreal Impact International slots
Slot	Player	Nationality
1	Hassoun Camara	France
2	Felipe	Brazil
3	Matteo Ferrari	Italy
4	Marco Di Vaio	Italy
5	Ignacio Piatti	Argentina
6	Adrián López Rodríguez	Spain
7	Andrés Romero	Argentina
8	Krzysztof Król	Poland
9	Gorka Larrea	Spain
10	Gege Soriola	Nigeria
11	James Bissue	Ghana

Foreign-Born Players with Domestic Status
Player	Nationality
Calum Mallace	(Scotland) Scotland^{G}
Wandrille Lefèvre	France ^{C}
Zakaria Messoudi	Morocco / (Canada)
Mamadou Danso	(The Gambia) Gambia^{G}

- (Canada) – Player is Canadian citizen;
- (United States) – Player is U.S. citizen;
- G – Player has U.S. green card;
- C – Player has permanent Canadian residency.

== Management ==
- Sporting director — Vacant
- Technical director — (United States) Matt Jordan
- Director, Montreal Impact Academy — (France) Philippe Eullaffroy
- Head coach, Director of Player Personnel — (United States) Frank Klopas
- Assistant coach — (Canada) Mauro Biello
- Assistant coach — (Canada) Enzo Concina
- Goalkeeping coach — (Morocco) Youssef Dahha
- Physical Preparation Coach — (Canada) Paolo Pacione
- Team Administrator — (Canada) Daniel Pozzi
- Equipment Coordinator — (Canada) Remy Eyckerman
- Equipment Manager — (Canada) Aldo Ricciuti
- Players Service — (England) Bradley Adam Smith

== Recognition ==
=== MLS Team of the Week ===
Week	Player	Nation	Position	Report
4	Mapp	United States	MF	MLS Team of the Week: 4
8	Camara	France	DF	MLS Team of the Week: 8
8	Bernier	CAN	MF	MLS Team of the Week: 8
13	Nakajima-Farran	CAN	MF	MLS Team of the Week: 13
16	McInerney	United States	FW	MLS Team of the Week: 16
16	Pearce	United States	DF	MLS Team of the Week: 16
25	Piatti	ARG	MF	MLS Team of the Week: 25
27	Piatti	ARG	MF	MLS Team of the Week: 27
31	Di Vaio	Italy	FW	MLS Team of the Week: 31
33	Di Vaio	Italy	FW	MLS Team of the Week: 33

=== MLS Player of the Week ===
Week	Player	Nation	Position	Report
16	McInerney	United States	FW	MLS Player of the Week: 16
