= Patrycja Mikula =

Polish model

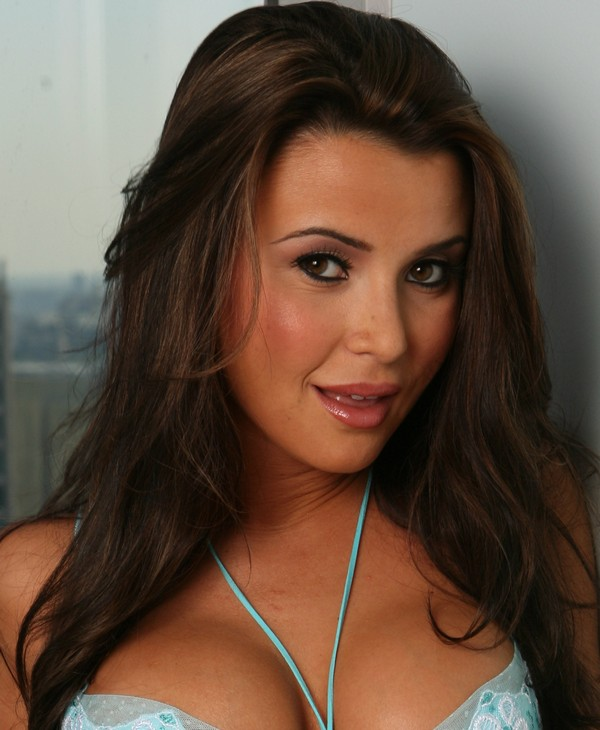
- Born: Patrycja Mikula; May 28, 1983 (age 43); Rzeszów, Poland
- Occupations: Model and Tv Personality
- Spouse: Krzysztof Król (m. 2010)
- Children: Cristiano Krol (born March 19, 2011)
- Modeling information
- Height: 5 ft 4 in (1.63 m)
- Hair color: Brunette
- Eye color: Hazel

Patrycja Mikula (born May 28, 1983, in Rzeszów, Poland) also known as Patricia Mikula is a Polish model and Playboy Cybergirl. Patrycja was the Cybergirl for the week of April 2, 2007 – her first time posing for Playboy; the same pictures were also featured in the February 2007 issue under Potpourri. Mikula's other credits include: Grappling magazine, MMA Sports magazine March 2007, Hot Threads Catalog, as a model at World on Wheels Car Show, and as a special guest IFL (International Fight League) and IHC (Ironheart Crown) ring card girl. She has recently been featured in the Playboy article "How to Play Poker Like a Man". Furthermore, she has become the Cyber Girl of the Month for August 2007 and will be featured in the October issue of Playboy.

== Personal life ==
Patrycja dated mixed martial artist Andrei Arlovski for over two years before going their separate ways.

On June 17, 2010, she married professional soccer player Krzysztof Król, who played for the Major League Soccer team Chicago Fire and now plays for Montreal Impact FC, after dating for only seven weeks. On March 19, 2011, nine months after their wedding, Mikula gave birth to the couple's first child, a son named Cristiano.
