= James Bissue =

Ghanaian footballer

Personal information
- Full name: James Bissue
- Date of birth: 16 June 1991 (age 35)
- Place of birth: Sekondi-Takoradi, Ghana
- Height: 1.82 m (6 ft 0 in)
- Position: Attacking midfielder

Team information
- Current team: Ococias Kyoto
- Number: 18

Youth career
- –2005: Young Wages FC
- 2006–2008: Eleven Wise

Senior career*
Years	Team	Apps	(Gls)
2008–2009	Eleven Wise		(12)
2009–2012	Hapoel Be'er Sheva	20	(0)
2011–2012	→ Maccabi Umm al-Fahm (loan)	18	(6)
2012–2013	Hearts of Oak	15	(0)
2014	Eleven Wise	16	(13)
2014	Montreal Impact	0	(0)
2016	Pittsburgh Riverhounds	6	(0)
2016–2019	Sanga Balende	40	(6)
2019	Eleven Wise		
2019–2021	Elmina Sharks	18	(6)
2022–	Ococias Kyoto	0	(0)

International career
2011	Ghana U20	5	(0)
- * Club domestic league appearances and goals as of 23:56, 15 April 2022 (UTC)

James Bissue (born 16 June 1991 in Sekondi-Takoradi) is a Ghanaian footballer who plays as an attacking midfielder for Ococias Kyoto.

== Career ==
Bissue began his career with Young Wages F.C. before transferring to Eleven Wise in 2006. On 4 January 2009 he went on a 2-week trial with Blackburn Rovers F.C. of the English Premier League. He moved to Hapoel Be'er Sheva F.C. in December 2009, from Eleven Wise of the Ghanaian Premiership. Bissue scored 13 goals in 16 matches for Eleven Wise during the 2013-2014 Division 1 season.

On September 18, 2014, Bissue signed a 3-year contract with the Montreal Impact of Major League Soccer. He was training with Ghanaian champions Asante Kotoko but left to sign with the Canadian club. He was released at the end of the season without making a first-team appearance. One Ghanaian source indicated that complications with paperwork prevented the player from appearing for the club. After being released by Montreal, Bissue returned to his native Ghana but failed to secure a contract with a top-flight club. In December 2015, Bissue had been training with Ghana Premier League club Sekondi Hasaacas for three weeks while in discussion over a contract. The club saw him as a potential replacement for Theophilus Nyame who left the club for Asante Kotoko.

Despite training with Hasaacas, it was announced that Bissue had signed a 2-year contract with the Pittsburgh Riverhounds of the United Soccer League for the 2016 USL season. The move was officially announced on 11 February 2016.

== International career ==
Bissue made five appearances for the Ghana U20 team at the 2011 African Youth Championship in South Africa. Bissue was also part of the Under-17 team.
