= Hans-Dieter Schmidt =

German football player and manager (1948–2026)

Personal information
- Date of birth: 9 January 1948
- Place of birth: Hanover, Lower Saxony, Allied-occupied Germany
- Date of death: 6 October 2026 (aged 78)
- Place of death: Meppen, Lower Saxony, Germany
- Position: Midfielder

Youth career
- –1966: Hannover 96

Senior career*
Years	Team	Apps	(Gls)
?–1969	Hannover 96 II		

Managerial career
- 1978–1983: SV Meppen
- 1983–1984: Eintracht Nordhorn
- 1984–1988: VfB Oldenburg
- 1988–1990: Bayern Munich (A)
- 1990: Hannover 96
- 1992–1993: VfB Lübeck
- 1993–1994: VfL Osnabrück
- 1994–1995: Baladeyet Al-Mahalla
- 1995–1996: Al-Qadisiya Al Khubar
- 1996–1999: 1. FC Magdeburg
- 2003: Persepolis
- 2003–2004: King Faisal Babes
- 2004–2005: Asante Kotoko
- 2005: Ismaily SC
- 2006: All Blacks FC
- 2007: Black Leopards
- 2009–2010: Eleven Wise
- * Club domestic league appearances and goals

Hans-Dieter Schmidt (9 January 1948 – 6 October 2026) was a German football player turned manager.

== Playing career ==
Schmidt's playing career – part of which he spent with Hannover 96 – ended early after a severe injury at the age of 23.

== Coaching career ==
Following the end of his playing days, Schmidt passed his manager diploma and worked as manager of SV Meppen for several years. After spending a year with Eintracht Nordhorn, Schmidt joined VfB Oldenburg as manager and came in second place in the German amateur football championship in 1988. In the same year, he joined FC Bayern Munich, managing their reserve team for two years, before taking over as managing director of Hannover 96. While working in that office in Hannover, he was interim manager for two matches, before Michael Lorkowski took over. He also managed VfB Lübeck and VfL Osnabrück, before Schmidt went abroad for the first time in 1994. He managed Egyptian top-flight team Baladeyet Al-Mahalla before joining Saudi Premier League side Al-Qadisiya Al Khubar. In 1996, he returned to Germany, taking over as managing director of 1. FC Magdeburg. In September 1996, he succeeded Karl Herdle as Magdeburg manager, a job he kept until 1999. With Magdeburg he won promotion to the then-third-tier Regionalliga. After he was sacked at 1. FC Magdeburg in the fall of 1999, Schmidt became a scout for Bundesliga side Hamburger SV Between 2003 and 2007, Schmidt went abroad again, managing teams in Iran (Persepolis F.C.), Ghana (King Faisal Babes, Asante Kotoko, All Blacks FC), Egypt (Ismaily SC) and South Africa (Black Leopards). Since the beginning of the 2008–09 season, Schmidt has been director of sports at sixth-tier side SC BW 94 Papenburg. After he was sacked in December 2009, Schmidt took on managing Ghana side Sekondi Eleven Wise who are fighting relegation from the Ghana Premier League.

== Death ==
Schmidt died on 6 October 2026, at the age of 78.
