= Zakaria Messoudi =

Canadian professional soccer player (born 1993)

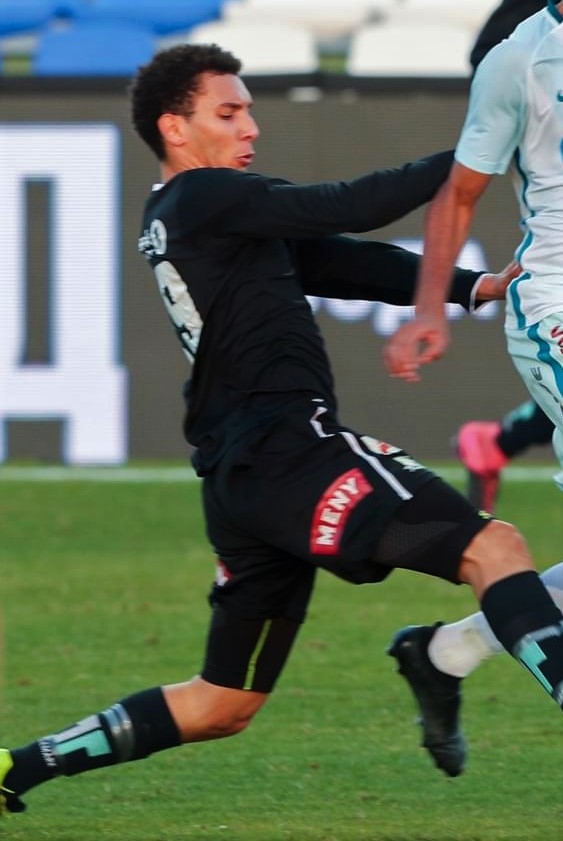
- Messoudi in 2017

Personal information
- Date of birth: October 30, 1993 (age 33)
- Place of birth: Casablanca, Morocco
- Height: 1.78 m (5 ft 10 in)
- Position: Midfielder

Youth career
- Montreal-Concordia AAA
- 2010–2013: Montreal Impact

Senior career*
Years	Team	Apps	(Gls)
2013–2014	Montreal Impact	0	(0)
2014	→ Ottawa Fury (loan)	0	(0)
2015	FC Montreal	22	(2)
2016–2017	Odd	12	(1)
2021	CS Mont-Royal Outremont	12	(1)

International career^{‡}
2013	Canada U20	2	(0)
- * Club domestic league appearances and goals as of October 14, 2021 ‡ National team caps and goals as of April 24, 2014

Zakaria Messoudi (born October 30, 1993) is a former professional soccer player who played as a midfielder. Born in Morocco, he represented Canada at the youth international level.

== Club career ==
=== Early career ===
Born in Casablanca, Morocco, Messoudi moved to Canada at the age of eight. He played his youth soccer with Montreal-Concordia AAA before joining the Montreal Impact Academy in 2010. He played with the senior academy team in the Canadian Soccer League's first division during the 2012 season. Messoudi would help Montreal clinch a playoff berth by finishing second in the division. The academy side would defeat Toronto FC's academy in the quarterfinal. In the next round of the postseason, Montreal would defeat the York Region Shooters to qualify for the championship final match. He would appear in the championship match, where Toronto Croatia would defeat Montreal.

=== Montreal Impact ===
On June 4, 2013, it was announced that Messoudi had signed his first professional contract with the Montreal Impact of Major League Soccer. In his debut season with the senior team, he played in the league's reserve division, where he appeared in 10 matches. After the conclusion of the season, Montreal would extend its contract for the 2014 season.

On March 28, 2014, it was confirmed that Messoudi would join the new expansion North American Soccer League side Ottawa Fury FC for the 2014 season. He then made his professional debut in the Canadian Championship against FC Edmonton. He came on as a 77th-minute substitute for Oliver Minatel as the match ended 0–0. Messoudi would fail to make a league appearance for Ottawa, and upon his return to Montreal, his contract option was declined at the end of the 2014 season.

=== FC Montreal ===
Despite being cut, Messoudi would remain a part of the Impact organization, being announced as part of the roster of the newly formed FC Montreal on March 13, 2015. He was released by the team at the end of the 2015 USL season.

=== Odds Ballklubb ===
Messoudi signed a 2-year deal with Norwegian top-flight Odd on March 17, 2016. He shortly after made his debut, coming on as a substitute in a cup tie against Tollnes. He would make his European continental tournament debut against PAS Giannina on July 21, 2016. Messoudi left the club after the 2017 season when his contract expired.

=== Mont-Royal Outremont ===
In 2020, he played in the Première ligue de soccer du Québec with CS Mont-Royal Outremont.

== International career ==
Messoudi made his international debut for the Canada U20 side on February 18, 2013, against Cuba U20 in the 2013 CONCACAF U-20 Championship. He was also selected to represent Canada in the 2013 Jeux de la Francophonie.

== Honors ==
Montreal Impact Academy

- CSL Championship Runners-up: 2012

== Career statistics ==
As of December 31, 2016

Club	Season	League			League Cup		Domestic Cup		CONCACAF		Total	
Club	Season	Division	Apps	Goals	Apps	Goals	Apps	Goals	Apps	Goals	Apps	Goals
Montreal Impact	2014	NASL	0	0	—	—	0	0	—	—	0	0
Ottawa Fury FC (loan)	2014	NASL	0	0	—	—	1	0	—	—	1	0
FC Montreal	2015	USL	22	2	—	—	—	—	—	—	22	2
Odds BK	2016	Tippeligaen	2	0	1	0	—	—	0	0	3	0
Career total			24	2	1	0	1	0	0	0	26	2
