= Dilly Duka =

American soccer player (born 1989)

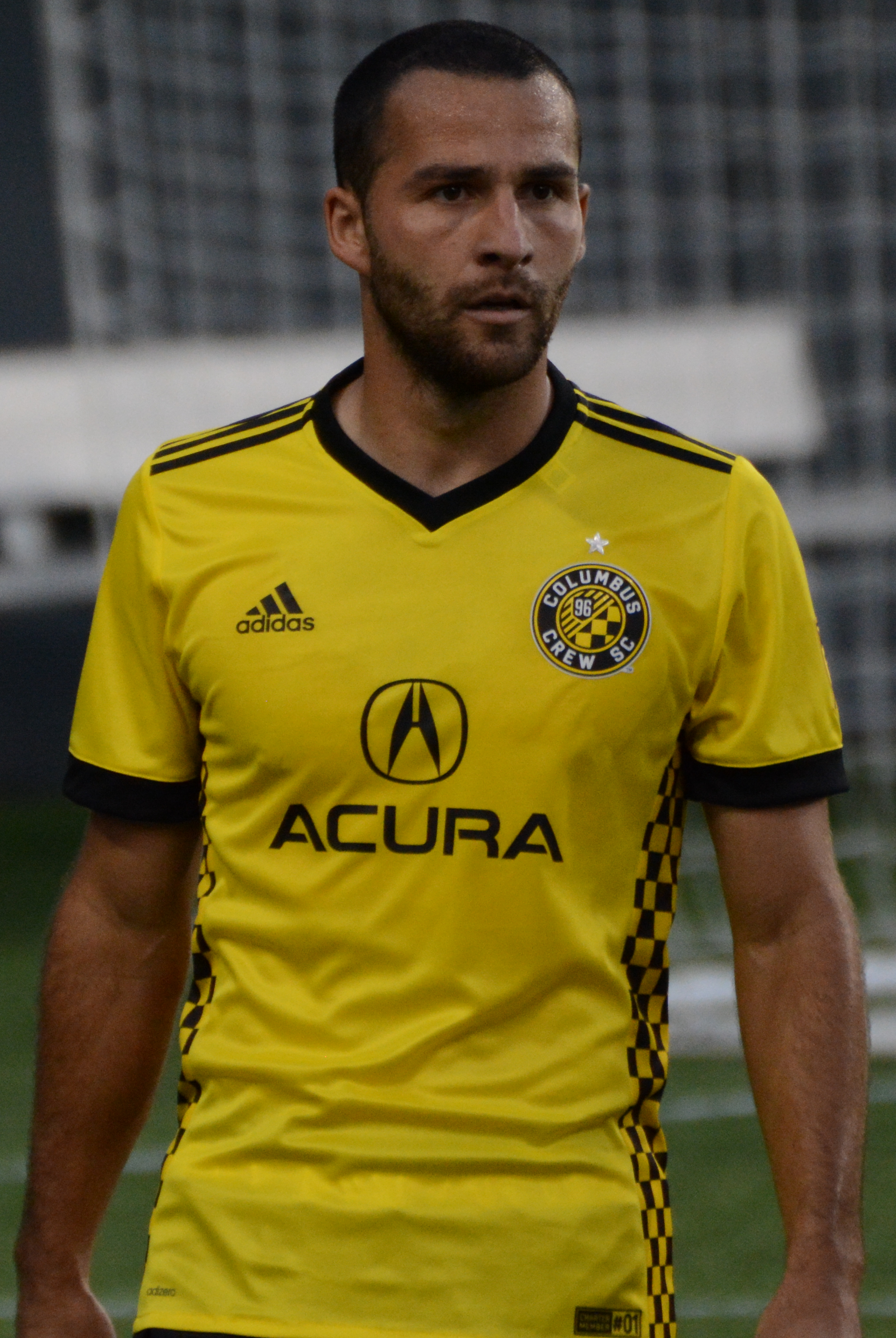
- Duka with Columbus Crew in 2017

Personal information
- Full name: Dilaver Duka
- Date of birth: September 15, 1989 (age 37)
- Place of birth: Montville, New Jersey, United States
- Height: 5 ft 9 in (1.75 m)
- Position: Midfielder

Team information
- Current team: FC Motown

College career
Years	Team	Apps	(Gls)
2007–2008	Rutgers Scarlet Knights	36	(10)

Senior career*
Years	Team	Apps	(Gls)
2008	New Jersey Rangers	0	(0)
2008–2009	Newark Ironbound Express	7	(1)
2010–2012	Columbus Crew	45	(2)
2013–2014	Chicago Fire	37	(4)
2014–2015	Montreal Impact	41	(5)
2016–2017	Columbus Crew	15	(1)
2017	New York Red Bulls	3	(0)
2017	→ New York Red Bulls II (loan)	3	(0)
2018	FC Motown	6	(6)
2019	Partizani Tirana	13	(1)
2020–	FC Motown	0	(0)

International career
2009	United States U20	13	(2)
2012	United States U23	1	(0)

Managerial career
- 2024: FC Motown
Medal record
Representing United States
Runner-up	CONCACAF U-20 Championship	2009
- * Club domestic league appearances and goals as of 19:35, 24 October 2019 (UTC)

Dilaver Duka (born September 15, 1989) is an American professional soccer player who plays as a midfielder for FC Motown in the National Premier Soccer League.

== Career ==
=== Youth and college ===
Duka grew up in Montville, New Jersey, to an Albanian family originally from Debar. Duka played at Montville Township High School, won three New Jersey state titles and one national title at club level, spent time in the Red Bull Academy, and played college soccer at Rutgers University. During his time at Rutgers, he led the team in scoring and was a 2008 All-Big East selection. For his career, he played in thirty-six games, making thirty-five starts, scoring ten goals and contributing five assists.

During his college years Duka played two seasons with the Newark Ironbound Express in the USL Premier Development League. He actually started 2008 with the New Jersey Rangers but he never made an appearance for the club.

=== Professional ===
==== Columbus Crew ====
Duka was drafted in the first round (eighth overall) of the 2010 MLS SuperDraft by Columbus Crew. He made his debut for the Crew on August 14, 2010, against Real Salt Lake in a 2–0 defeat. Later that season he made his first start for Columbus, picking up a yellow card in a 1–0 victory at D.C. United on September 4, 2010. Duka made five appearances in the 2010–11 CONCACAF Champions League, providing two assists, and also made three appearances in the 2010 Lamar Hunt U.S. Open Cup.

Duka scored his first career goal on October 15, 2011, in a 3–0 victory over New England Revolution. He trapped an attempted clearance outside the box and finished from the left side of the penalty area in the 59th minute. He would go on to score his second career goal in the Crew's next match, a 3–2 defeat to Chicago Fire on October 22, 2011. Duka appeared against Colorado Rapids in the 2011 MLS Cup Playoffs as the Crew were eliminated 1–0 by the defending champions in the wildcard round.

Duka notched two assists from 20 appearances in 2012.

==== Chicago Fire ====
After three seasons in Columbus, Duka was traded to Chicago Fire on February 1, 2013, in exchange for Dominic Oduro. Duka made his debut for the Fire on March 3, 2013, in a season-opening 4–0 loss to the LA Galaxy. He was subbed off after 57 minutes. On June 22, 2013, in his return to Columbus, Duka scored in the 52nd minute of a 2–1 victory for the Fire, his first goal for the club. He set career highs in his first season with Chicago, scoring four goals and providing three assists.

Duka began the 2014 season in Chicago, but appeared in just six of the first 19 matches. He did start away to his former club Columbus on May 24, but was subbed off after 61 minutes in a 2–0 defeat. His final appearance with the Fire came on July 6 in a 1–1 away draw with Sporting KC, when he came on as a substitute at halftime for Alex.

==== Montreal Impact ====
On July 29, 2014, Duka departed Chicago when he was traded to the Montreal Impact in exchange for Sanna Nyassi. He made his debut for the Impact on August 2, 2014, in a 401 Derby match against Toronto FC, coming on as a substitute for Justin Mapp in the 74th minute of a 2–0 defeat. Duka made his first start in Montreal when his former club, the Fire, visited Stade Saputo on 16 August 2014. He played the full 90 minutes, tallying one shot in a 1–0 Impact victory. In the next MLS match for Montreal, away to the New York Red Bulls on August 23, 2014, Duka tallied his first goal for the Impact. His left-footed strike in the 37th minute gave the Impact a 1–0 lead at the time, but they went on to fall 4–2 to the Red Bulls. Duka went on to score in matches against the Houston Dynamo and San Jose Earthquakes and finished the 2014 season with three goals for Montreal, appearing in all 14 matches after the trade.

In the 2014–15 CONCACAF Champions League, Duka appeared in all 10 matches the Impact played in their run to the final of the tournament. He scored twice, with both goals coming in the first leg of the quarterfinal matchup with Mexican side Pachuca. Duka started both legs of the 2015 CONCACAF Champions League Finals against Mexican side América. In the first leg, held at the Estadio Azteca, he received a yellow card and was replaced in the 71st minute by Maxim Tissot as América's Oribe Peralta scored in the 89th minute to earn a 1–1 draw. In the second leg, at the Olympic Stadium, Duka went the full 90 minutes as the Impact were defeated 4–2 and denied their first-ever CONCACAF title by a 5–3 aggregate score.

In the 2015 Canadian Championship, Duka appeared in three of four games for the Impact, only being benched in the second leg of the championship against Vancouver Whitecaps FC. In the first leg, he had started and played 76 minutes before being replaced by Andrés Romero. With the 4–2 aggregate defeat, Montreal was denied a berth in the 2015–16 CONCACAF Champions League.

Duka opened the 2015 season in the starting lineup, as he went the full 90 minutes of a 1–0 season-opening loss to D.C. United, but he would wind up starting just 19 of 34 regular-season matches. Duka scored his first goal of the season on May 16 against Real Salt Lake, his 78th-minute strike helping Montreal to their first MLS win of the season, 4–1. He wouldn't score again until September 19 against Eastern Conference-leading New England Revolution. After coming on as a substitute for Andrés Romero in the 71st minute, Duka chipped Revolution goalkeeper Bobby Shuttleworth in the 76th minute to seal a 3–0 victory for the Impact. In the 2015 MLS Cup Playoffs, Duka appeared in all three matches for the Impact, but did not finish the full 90 minutes in any. He started the 3–0 victory in the Knockout Round over Toronto FC, before being replaced on 84 minutes by Dominic Oduro. At home for the first leg of the semifinals against Columbus Crew SC, Duka came off the bench to replace Oduro in the 61st minute of a 2–1 victory. The second leg at MAPFRE Stadium would turn out to be Duka's last game with Montreal. His 40th-minute goal would put the Impact up 3–2 on aggregate, but Duka would be replaced by Hassoun Camara in the 65th minute as Montreal would lose the game, 3–1 in extra time, and the series 4–3 on aggregate.

At the end of the 2015 season, Montreal expressed interest in bringing Duka back for 2016, with the player saying, "Now, I’m just waiting for the Impact to make an offer. I’m going to look at that. If that’s good, I’ll definitely come back." However, on January 18, 2016, Duka announced he would not return to Montreal, with the club quoted as saying he wanted to pursue opportunities in Europe. The Impact retained his rights in MLS.

==== Return to Columbus ====
After leaving Montreal following the 2015 season, Duka returned to Columbus on June 20, 2016, after Columbus acquired his right of first refusal from Montreal in exchange for general allocation money, targeted allocation money, and a second round pick in the 2017 MLS SuperDraft. He made his return to Columbus July 3, 2016, playing 17 minutes as a substitute in a 3–2 win against Sporting KC. Duka's first goal back with Crew SC came October 1, 2016, in a 3–0 victory over his former club, Chicago Fire. He ended the 2016 season with one goal and one assist in 15 appearances.

Duka was waived by Columbus on July 10, 2017.

==== New York Red Bulls ====
Duka was picked up by the New York Red Bulls on August 10, 2017.

==== FC Motown coaching career ====
In 2024, Duka became head coach of FC Motown, taking over from Gideon Baah. It was his first season as a head coach.

=== International ===
Duka played in all three games for the United States in the 2009 FIFA U-20 World Cup in Egypt. He scored the third goal and gave an assist in the team's 4–1 win over Cameroon.

Duka made his lone appearance with the U-23 national team on February 29, 2012, against Mexico, in the lead up to the 2012 London Olympics. He was not selected to the US team for the 2012 CONCACAF Men's Olympic Qualifying Championship, where the United States was eliminated in the group stage.

== Career statistics ==
As of August 4, 2018

Club	Season	League			Playoffs (Note: Includes the MLS Cup Playoffs and NPSL Playoffs)		Cup (Note: Includes the U.S. Open Cup and Canadian Championship)		Continental		Total	
Club	Season	Division	Apps	Goals	Apps	Goals	Apps	Goals	Apps	Goals	Apps	Goals
New Jersey Rangers	2008	PDL	0	0	–		–		–		0	0
Newark Ironbound Express	2008	PDL	4	1	0	0	–		–		4	1
Newark Ironbound Express	2009	PDL	3	0	–		–		–		3	0
Newark Ironbound Express	Total		7	1	0	0	0	0	0	0	7	1
Columbus Crew	2010	MLS	3	0	0	0	3	0	4	0	10	0
Columbus Crew	2011	MLS	22	2	1	0	0	0	1	0	24	2
Columbus Crew	2012	MLS	20	0	–		0	0	–		20	0
Columbus Crew	Total		45	2	1	0	3	0	5	0	54	2
Chicago Fire	2013	MLS	31	4	–		4	0	–		35	4
Chicago Fire	2014	MLS	6	0	–		0	0	–		6	0
Chicago Fire	Total		37	4	0	0	4	0	0	0	41	4
Montreal Impact	2014	MLS	14	3	–		0	0	4	0	18	3
Montreal Impact	2015	MLS	27	2	3	1	3	0	6	2	39	5
Montreal Impact	Total		41	5	3	1	3	0	10	2	57	8
Columbus Crew SC	2016	MLS	15	1	–		0	0	–		15	1
Columbus Crew SC	2017	MLS	0	0	0	0	1	0	–		1	0
Columbus Crew SC	Total		15	1	0	0	1	0	0	0	16	1
New York Red Bulls	2017	MLS	3	0	0	0	0	0	0	0	3	0
New York Red Bulls II (loan)	2017	USL	3	0	0	0	–		–		3	0
FC Motown	2018	NPSL	6	6	5	3	2	3	–		13	12
Partizani Tirana	2018–19	Albanian Superliga	0	0	–		0	0	0	0	0	0
Career total			157	19	9	4	13	3	15	2	194	28

== Honors ==
=== FC Motown ===
- Keystone Conference Regular Season Champion: 2018
- Keystone Conference Champion: 2018
- Northeast Region Champion: 2018
- NPSL Keystone Conference XI Team: 2018
- NPSL Northeast Region XI Team: 2018

=== Partizani Tirana ===
- Albanian Superliga Champion: 2018–19
