= Sanna Nyassi =

Gambian footballer

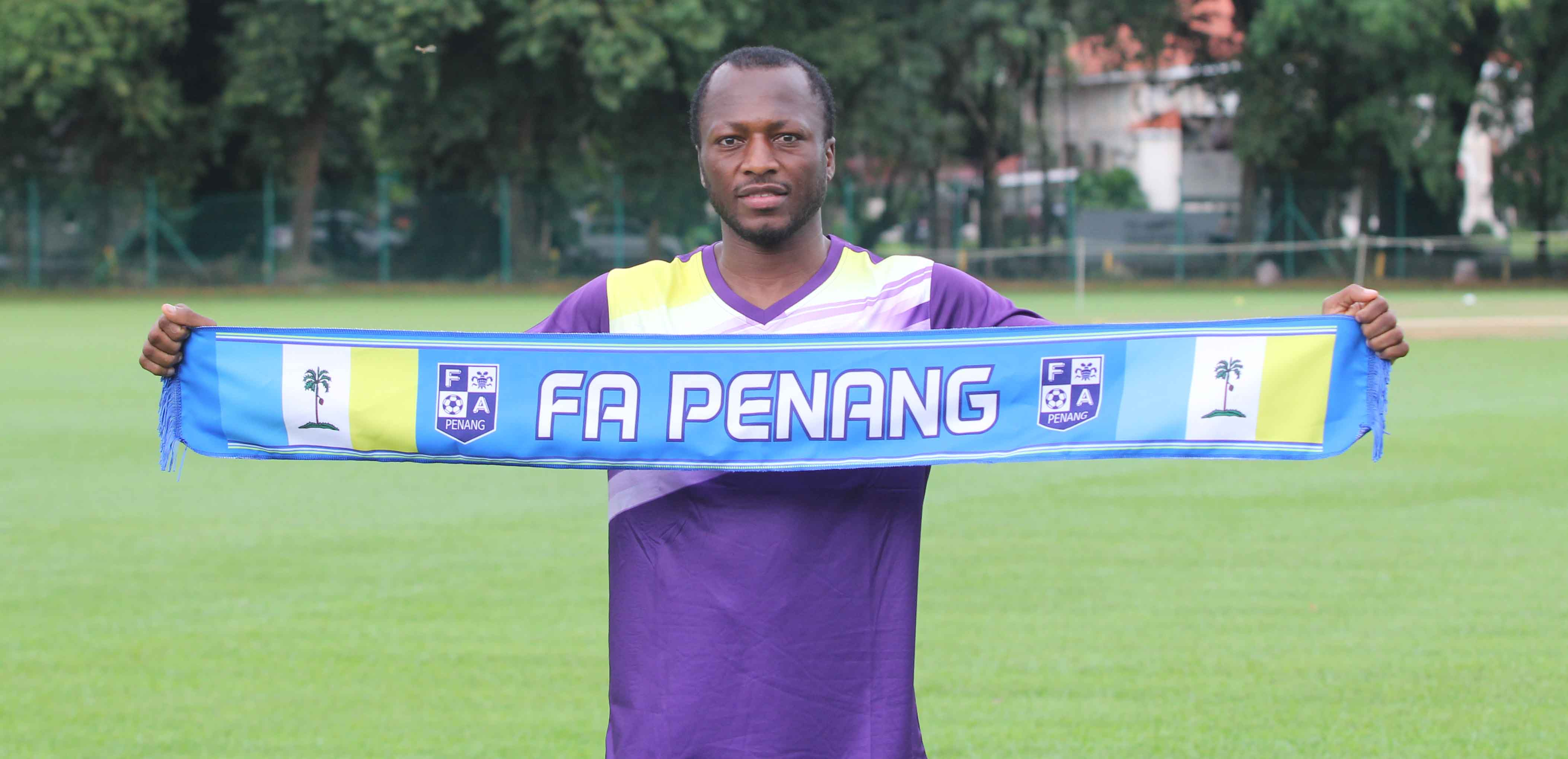
- Nyassi after his signing for Penang

Personal information
- Full name: Sanna Nyassi
- Date of birth: 31 January 1989 (age 37)
- Place of birth: Bwiam, Gambia
- Height: 5 ft 8 in (1.73 m)
- Position: Forward

Youth career
- 2001–2004: Gambia Ports Authority

Senior career*
Years	Team	Apps	(Gls)
2004–2007	Gambia Ports Authority	35	
2008	Seattle Sounders	4	(0)
2009–2010	Seattle Sounders FC	38	(2)
2011	Colorado Rapids	26	(5)
2012–2014	Montreal Impact	54	(8)
2014	Chicago Fire	10	(1)
2015–2016	San Jose Earthquakes	28	(2)
2017–2019	Penang	52	(14)

International career
2005	Gambia U17	3	(0)
2007	Gambia U20	2	(0)
2010–2015	Gambia	14	(0)
- * Club domestic league appearances and goals as of 27 July 2018

Sanna Nyassi (born 31 January 1989) is a Gambian professional footballer who plays as a forward. He played for the Gambia national team from 2010 to 2015, making fourteen appearances.

== Club career ==
=== Gambia Ports Authority ===
Nyassi began his professional career in 2004 with Gambia Ports Authority of the GFA League First Division. The midfielder remained with the club through the 2007 season, helping the club capture the 2007 Gambian FA Cup, and scoring the game-winning goal in the final.

Nyassi's play with the Gambian Under-20 National Team sparked interest among many Major League Soccer clubs. In late 2007 Nyassi was on trial with New England Revolution, the club that signed his twin brother Sainey.

=== Seattle Sounders FC ===
Following a trial spell with newly formed Seattle Sounders FC, Sanna became the third player signed by the club. He was subsequently loaned to Seattle Sounders for the remainder of the 2008 season, prior to Seattle Sounders FC's MLS debut in 2009. On 5 October 2010 Nyassi scored two goals in the final of the 2010 Lamar Hunt US Open Cup Final to help Seattle to a 2–1 victory over Columbus Crew and capture its second straight Cup title. He became the first player in modern history to score multiple goals in the Cup final and was named Player of The Round as a result.

=== Vancouver Whitecaps FC and Colorado Rapids ===
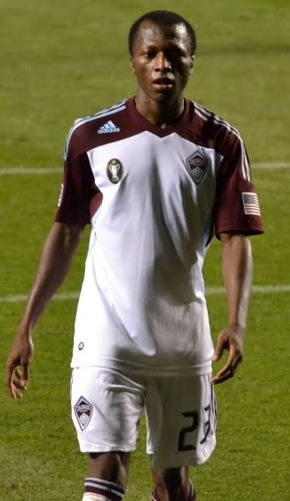
Playing for Colorado Rapids

On 24 November 2010, Nyassi was selected by Vancouver Whitecaps FC as their first pick in the 2010 MLS Expansion Draft but he was immediately traded to Colorado Rapids for an international roster slot. On 20 July in a match versus New York Red Bulls, Nyassi scored his first MLS hat-trick and his first three goals for Colorado. His fourth goal of the season came on 29 July against Philadelphia Union. Strike partner Omar Cummings set up Nyassi with a lovely through ball and the Gambian scored with a curling shot to put his side 2–0 up.

=== Montreal Impact, Chicago Fire ===
Nyassi was left exposed by Colorado in the 2011 MLS Expansion Draft and was selected by expansion side Montreal Impact. Nyassi spent 2 1/2 seasons with Montreal before being traded to Chicago Fire on 29 July 2014 in exchange for midfielder Dilly Duka.

=== San Jose Earthquakes ===
Chicago cut ties with Nyassi at the conclusion of the 2014 season and he entered the 2014 MLS Re-Entry Draft. In December 2014, Nyassi was selected by San Jose Earthquakes in stage two of the draft.

=== Penang FA ===
In June 2017, Nyassi sign for Malaysian side Penang.

== International career ==
Nyassi has represented his nation at various youth levels. He earned three caps playing for the Gambian U-17 national team in the 2005 African Under-17 Championship, scoring one goal against Burkina Faso. He also earned two caps for the U-20 national team in the 2007 FIFA U-20 World Cup. In 2010, he made his debut for the full national team.

== Personal life ==
Sanna is the twin brother of footballer Sainey Nyassi.

Nyassi holds U.S. citizenship.

== Career statistics ==
As of 28 February 2014

Club	Season	League	League			Cup			Continental			Playoffs			Total		
Club	Season	League	Apps	Goals	Assists	Apps	Goals	Assists	Apps	Goals	Assists	Apps	Goals	Assists	Apps	Goals	Assists
Seattle Sounders	2008	USL First Division	4	0	0	0	0	0	0	0	0	0	0	0	4	0	0
Seattle Sounders FC	2009	MLS	14	0	0	5	1	1	–			1	0	0	20	1	2
Seattle Sounders FC	2010	MLS	24	2	3	3	2	1	7	0	0	2	0	0	36	4	4
Colorado Rapids	2011	MLS	26	5	5	1	0	0	5	0	1	3	0	0	35	5	6
Montreal Impact	2012	MLS	28	6	3	2	0	0	–			–			30	6	3
Montreal Impact	2013	MLS	22	1	1	2	0	0	4	0	0	0	0	0	28	1	1
Montreal Impact	2014	MLS	2	1	0	1	0	0	–			–			–		

== Honours ==
Gambia Ports Authority

- Gambian Championnat National D1 (1): 2006
- Gambian Cup (1): 2007

Seattle Sounders FC

- Lamar Hunt US Open Cup (2): 2009, 2010

Montreal Impact

- Canadian Championship (2): 2013, 2014

Individual

- Named MLS Humanitarian of the Month in April 2010
- MLS Player of the Week; for Week 19, 2011
