= Santiago González (footballer, born 1992) =

Uruguayan footballer (born 1992)

Personal information
- Full name: Santiago Emiliano González Areco
- Date of birth: June 11, 1992 (age 34)
- Place of birth: Montevideo, Uruguay
- Height: 5 ft 8 in (1.73 m)
- Position: Forward

Youth career
- River Plate
- 2011–2012: Sud América

Senior career*
Years	Team	Apps	(Gls)
2012–2014	Sud América	45	(14)
2014–2015	Montreal Impact	9	(0)
2014	→ Danubio (loan)	11	(1)
2015	Sud América	0	(0)
2015–2016	Villa Teresa	8	(0)
2016	Huracán	12	(0)
2016–2018	Rampla Juniors	43	(7)
2018–2019	Sud América	26	(2)
2020	Uruguay Montevideo	5	(1)

International career
2009	Uruguay U17	2	(0)
- * Club domestic league appearances and goals as of 18:32, 14 July 2021 (UTC)

Santiago Emiliano González Areco (born June 11, 1992) is an Uruguayan professional footballer.

== Career ==
=== Club ===
Santiago González began his career in the youth system of Montevideo club Sud América. In 2011, he made his first team debut and during the 2012–13 Uruguayan Segunda División season helped Sud América gain promotion to the top flight as Segunda División champions. In his first season in the Uruguayan Primera División González was the team's top scorer with five goals and two assists in 14 matches.

On February 14, 2014 the Montreal Impact announced the signing of González for an undisclosed fee. The transfer fell under Major League Soccer's Special Discovery rule. He is a dynamic forward that moves very well and can play with his back to the goal, as described by Montreal sporting director Nick De Santis. He made his first appearance in the pre-season on February 16, 2014 against Orlando City Soccer Club and scored in the 56th minute. González was released by Montreal on 1 April 2015.

In September 2020, González joined Uruguay Montevideo.

=== International ===
González has represented Uruguay at the Under 17 level. He appeared for his nation in two matches during the 2009 FIFA U-17 World Cup.

== Honors ==
=== Montreal Impact ===
- Canadian Championship (1): 2014
