= Krzysztof Król =

Polish footballer (born 1987)

Personal information
- Full name: Krzysztof Łukasz Król
- Date of birth: 6 February 1987 (age 39)
- Place of birth: Wodzisław Śląski, Poland
- Height: 1.85 m (6 ft 1 in)
- Position: Left-back

Youth career
- Górnik Radlin
- WSP Wodzisław Śląski
- Amica Wronki

Senior career*
Years	Team	Apps	(Gls)
2006–2007	Dyskobolia Grodzisk	1	(0)
2007	Real Madrid C		
2007–2008	Real Madrid Castilla		
2008–2011	Jagiellonia Białystok	30	(0)
2010	→ Chicago Fire (loan)	19	(0)
2011	→ Polonia Bytom (loan)	7	(0)
2011–2012	Podbeskidzie Bielsko-Biała	34	(0)
2013	Sheriff Tiraspol	9	(0)
2013–2014	Piast Gliwice	25	(1)
2014	Montreal Impact	12	(0)
2015–2016	Kalloni	11	(0)
2016	AAC Eagles		

International career
2007	Poland U20	3	(0)
- * Club domestic league appearances and goals

Krzysztof Łukasz Król (born 6 February 1987) is a Polish professional football coach and former player who is currently a coach for American club SAA United SC.

== Career ==
Król played with the youth teams of Górnik Radlin, WSP Wodzisław Śląski and Amica Wronki, before signing his first professional contract with Dyskobolia Grodzisk in 2006. He made his professional debut for Grodzisk in the Polish Ekstraklasa in August 2006.

In early 2007, Król joined Real Madrid's third team. At the start of the 2007–08 season, he was briefly promoted to Real Madrid Castilla but did not make any appearances. In July 2008, having failed to make an impression in Spain, he returned to his native Poland and signed a three-year contract with Jagiellonia Białystok.

In January 2010, Chicago Fire of Major League Soccer signed the Polish defender from Jagiellonia on a one-year loan deal. He made his MLS debut on 3 April 2010 against Colorado Rapids.

On 24 November 2010, it was announced that the Chicago Fire parted ways with Krol.

In July 2011, he joined Podbeskidzie Bielsko-Biała on a two-year contract.

Król signed for Impact de Montréal on 26 June 2014. On 24 June 2015, he signed with Greek side AEL Kalloni on a two-year contract for an undisclosed fee.

== Personal life ==
On 17 June 2010, he married model Patrycja Mikula. On 19 March 2011, nine months after their wedding, Mikula gave birth to the couple's first child, a son named Cristiano.

== Honours ==
Jagiellonia Białystok

- Polish Cup: 2009–10

Sheriff Tiraspol

- Divizia Naţională: 2012–13
