= Sekondi Eleven Wise F.C. =

Sekondi Eleven Wise
- Full name: Sekondi Eleven Wise Football Club
- Nicknames: Monkeys, Western Show Boys
- Founded: 1919
- Ground: Essipong Stadium
- Capacity: 20,000
- Chairman: Koby Spio-Garbrah
- Manager: Hans-Dieter Schmidt
- League: Poly Tank Division One League
- 2009–10: Glo Premier League, 16th
| Home colours | Away colours |

Sekondi Eleven Wise Football Club is a Ghanaian professional association football club, based in Sekondi, currently competing in the Poly Tank Division One League.

== History ==
Affectionately called the Western Show Boys, they are arguably the most popular and best supported football team in the Western Region of Ghana. The club has a long-standing tradition of playing the type of fascinating and entertaining game punctuated with eye-pleasing dribbling that keep fans on their toes.

The club was formed in 1919, deriving its strength from Railways workers in Sekondi. Inspired by burly forward player Edward Acquah, Eleven Wise won the national league in 1960 after two fruitless attempts. The formation of model club Real Republikans in 1961, robbed Wise of their livewire, Edward Acquah and the “Show Boys” made a poor show in the defence of the league title.

In October 2008 who suffered relegation to the lower division more than a decade ago, put up an impressive performance to thrash Norchip 3–1 in their premiership campaign opener, and that made many fans that turned up to witness the encounter tip the Sekondi lads for a comeback including their CEO.

== Honours ==
=== Domestic ===
- One Touch Premier League
  - Champions (1): 1960
