= Gorka Larrea =

Spanish footballer (born 1984)

Personal information
- Full name: Gorka Larrea García
- Date of birth: 7 April 1984 (age 42)
- Place of birth: San Sebastián, Spain
- Height: 1.84 m (6 ft 1/2 in)
- Position: Midfielder

Youth career
- 1993–1996: Antiguoko
- 1996–2002: Real Sociedad

Senior career*
Years	Team	Apps	(Gls)
2002–2005	Real Sociedad B	104	(16)
2004–2008	Real Sociedad	25	(0)
2006–2007	→ Almería (loan)	28	(2)
2008–2011	Levante	58	(1)
2011–2013	Numancia	22	(1)
2014	Montreal Impact	9	(0)
2016	Indy Eleven	8	(0)
Total		254	(20)

International career
2000–2001	Spain U16	7	(0)
2001	Spain U17	2	(0)
2002	Spain U19	1	(0)
2006	Spain U21	1	(0)
2005	Spain U23	4	(0)
Medal record
Men's Football
Representing Spain
UEFA European Under-16 Championship
Winner	2001 England
- * Club domestic league appearances and goals

Gorka Larrea García (born 7 April 1984) is a Spanish former footballer who played as a midfielder.

== Club career ==
Larrea was born San Sebastián, Gipuzkoa. A product of Real Sociedad's youth system, he first appeared for its main squad on 23 May 2004, playing 20 minutes in a 4–1 away win against Real Madrid (his only game of the season. He added a further three late substitute appearances in the following campaign). For 2006–07 he was loaned to Segunda División club UD Almería, playing an important role in the Andalusians' first-ever La Liga promotion.

In July 2007, Larrea returned to the Basques, who now competed in the second level. He appeared in only nine matches during the season, being subsequently released and joining Levante UD also in that tier.

Larrea featured regularly over the course of two division two campaigns, but only played six times in 2010–11's top flight – 235 minutes of action – in spite of having previously renewed his contract, leaving in June 2011 and signing with CD Numancia in the second tier. He scored his first and only goal for the Soria team on 27 August 2011, helping to a 1–1 draw at CD Alcoyano.

On 11 June 2014, Larrea signed with Major League Soccer's Montreal Impact after training for a month with the club. In early 2016 he switched to the North American Soccer League, having agreed to a deal at Indy Eleven.

== International career ==
Larrea represented Spain at various youth levels. He was part of the squad that won the 2001 UEFA European Under-16 Championship, and also helped the under-23s win the 2005 Mediterranean Games.

== Honours ==
Spain U16

- UEFA European Under-16 Championship: 2001

Spain U23

- Mediterranean Games: 2005
