= 2016 New York City FC season =

New York City FC
2016 season
- Owner: City Football Group (80%); Yankee Global Enterprises (20%)
- CEO: Ferran Soriano
- Head coach: Patrick Vieira
- Stadium: Yankee Stadium; The Bronx, New York
- MLS: Conference: 2nd Overall: 4th
- MLS Cup Playoffs: Conference Semi-Finals
- U.S. Open Cup: Fourth Round
- Top goalscorer: League: David Villa (23); All: David Villa (23)
- Highest home attendance: 37,858 (May 21 vs. New York Red Bulls)
- Lowest home attendance: 22,736 (June 2 vs. Real Salt Lake)
- Average home league attendance: 27,196 (regular season); 27,260 (including playoffs)
- Biggest win: NYC 5–1 COL (July 30)
- Biggest defeat: NYC 0–7 NY (May 21)
Home colors	Away colors

The 2016 New York City FC season was the club's second season of competition and their second in the top tier of American soccer, Major League Soccer (MLS). New York City FC played their home games at Yankee Stadium in the New York City borough of The Bronx.

== Results ==
=== Non-competitive ===
==== Friendlies ====
January 31, 2016 Friendly	Florida Gulf Coast Eagles	0–1	New York City FC	Fort Myers, Florida
5:30 PM EST		Report	Mullins 66'	Stadium: FGCU Soccer Complex; Attendance: 3,042

February 12, 2016 Friendly	New York City FC	1–0	Oklahoma City Energy	Bradenton, Florida
	Villa 18'	Report

==== Rowdies Suncoast Invitational ====
February 17, 2016 Friendly	New York City FC	1–0	Montreal Impact	St. Petersburg, Florida
7:00 PM EST	Mullins 75'	Report		Stadium: Al Lang Stadium

==== IMG Suncoast Pro Classic ====
Team	Pld	W	D	L	GF	GA	GD	Pts
FC Cincinnati	3	2	1	0	8	2	+6	7
New York City FC	3	2	0	1	5	3	+2	6
HB Køge	3	1	0	2	2	4	−2	3
KR Reykjavik	3	0	1	2	2	7	−4	1

February 20, 2016 Friendly	New York City FC	2–0	HB Køge	Bradenton, Florida
7:30 PM EST	Shelton 84'; Villa 88'	Report		Stadium: IMG Academy

February 24, 2016 Friendly	New York City FC	1–2	FC Cincinnati	Bradenton, Florida
5:00 PM EST	Lopez (yellow card) 56'; McNamara 89'	Report	Delbridge (yellow card) 52', (goal) 90+4'; Spencer 88'	Stadium: IMG Academy

February 27, 2016 Friendly	New York City FC	2–1	KR Reykjavik	Bradenton, Florida
7:30 PM EST	White (yellow card) 11'; Pirlo 21'; Diskerud 84'	Report	Hauksson 7'	Stadium: IMG Academy

=== Competitive ===
==== Major League Soccer ====
===== League tables =====
====== Eastern Conference ======
Pos	Team	Pld	W	L	T	GF	GA	GD	Pts	Qualification
1	New York Red Bulls	34	16	9	9	61	44	+17	57	MLS Cup Conference Semifinals
2	New York City FC	34	15	10	9	62	57	+5	54	MLS Cup Conference Semifinals
3	Toronto FC	34	14	9	11	51	39	+12	53	MLS Cup Knockout Round
4	D.C. United	34	11	10	13	53	47	+6	46	MLS Cup Knockout Round
5	Montreal Impact	34	11	11	12	49	53	−4	45	MLS Cup Knockout Round

Source: MLS

====== Overall ======
Pos	Team	Pld	W	L	T	GF	GA	GD	Pts	Qualification
2	Colorado Rapids	34	15	6	13	39	32	+7	58	CONCACAF Champions League
3	New York Red Bulls	34	16	9	9	61	44	+17	57	CONCACAF Champions League
4	New York City FC	34	15	10	9	62	57	+5	54	
5	Toronto FC	34	14	9	11	51	39	+12	53	CONCACAF Champions League
6	LA Galaxy	34	12	6	16	54	39	+15	52	

Source: MLS
Rules for classification: 1) points; 2) total wins; 3) total goal differential; 4) total goals scored;

===== Results summary =====
Overall								Home						Away					
Pld	W	D	L	GF	GA	GD	Pts	W	D	L	GF	GA	GD	W	D	L	GF	GA	GD
34	15	9	10	62	57	+5	54	8	6	3	35	28	+7	7	3	7	27	29	−2

Last updated: October 23, 2016.
Source: MLS

===== Results by round =====
Matchday	1	2	3	4	5	6	7	8	9	10	11	12	13	14	15	16	17	18	19	20	21	22	23	24	25	26	27	28	29	30	31	32	33	34
Stadium	A	H	H	H	H	A	A	H	H	A	A	A	H	H	H	H	A	H	A	A	A	A	H	A	A	H	A	H	A	H	H	A	A	H
Result	W	D	L	D	D	L	L	D	W	W	W	D	L	D	L	W	W	W	W	L	W	L	W	D	D	W	L	W	L	D	W	W	L	W

Source: MLS
A = Away; H = Home; W = Win; D = Draw; L = Loss

===== Matches =====
March 6, 2016 1	Chicago Fire	3–4	New York City FC	Chicago
2:00 PM EST (UTC−05:00)	Cociș 19'; Meira (yellow card) 32'; Igboananike 49'; Polster (yellow card) 62'; Accam 72' (pen.)	Report	McNamara 10'; Brillant (yellow card) 14'; Taylor 29', (yellow card) 59'; Shelton 36'; Diskerud 63'	Stadium: Toyota Park; Attendance: 17,768; Referee: Armando Villarreal

March 13, 2016 2	New York City FC	2–2	Toronto FC	New York, New York
3:00 PM EDT	Villa 24', 28' (pen.); Brillant (yellow card) 52'; Lopez (yellow card) 89'	Report	Perquis 45+2'; Giovinco 76'; Morgan (yellow card) 90'	Stadium: Yankee Stadium; Attendance: 30,321; Referee: Alan Kelly

March 18, 2016 3	New York City FC	0–1	Orlando City SC	New York, New York
7:00 PM EDT	Taylor (yellow card) 39'	Report	Larin 7'; Higuita (yellow card) 90'; Hines (yellow card) 90+3'	Stadium: Yankee Stadium; Attendance: 24,597; Referee: Allen Chapman

March 26, 2016 4	New York City FC	1–1	New England Revolution	New York, New York
2:00 PM EDT	McNamara 10', (yellow card) 90+2'; Iraloa (yellow card) 36'; Bravo (yellow card) 55'; Pirlo (yellow card) 68'	Report	Tierney 38'; Koffie (red card) 51'; Caldwell (yellow card) 65'	Stadium: Yankee Stadium; Attendance: 23,425; Referee: Ricardo Salazar

April 10, 2016 5	New York City FC	0–0	Chicago Fire	New York, New York
7:00 PM EDT	Matarrita (yellow card) 54'	Report	LaBrocca (yellow card) 86'	Stadium: Yankee Stadium; Attendance: 22,930; Referee: Mark Geiger

April 16, 2016 6	Columbus Crew	3–2	New York City FC	Columbus, Ohio
7:30 PM	Finlay 7'; Trapp (yellow card) 43'; Kamara 49'; Meram 80'; Parkhurst (red card) 86'	Report	Villa 15', 87' (pen.); Hernandez (yellow card) 27'; Mullins (yellow card) 82'; Iraola (yellow card) 84'	Stadium: Mapfre Stadium; Attendance: 16,715; Referee: Ted Unkel

April 23, 2016 7	Philadelphia Union	2–0	New York City FC	Chester, Pennsylvania
4:00 PM EDT	Pontius 26'; Fabinho (yellow card) 36'; Sapong 41'; Creavalle (yellow card) 90+1'	Report	Lopez (yellow card) 16'; Villa (yellow card) 69'; Bravo (yellow card) 89'	Stadium: Talen Energy Stadium; Attendance: 18,681; Referee: Jose Carlos Rivero

April 27, 2016 8	New York City FC	1–1	Montreal Impact	New York, New York
7:00 PM EDT	Lopez (yellow card) 29'; Bravo (yellow card) 35'; Allen 51'; White (yellow card) 78'	Report	Piatti (yellow card) 43'; Donadel (yellow card) 65'; Bernier (yellow card) 79'; Lefevre (yellow card) 89'; Oduro 90+1'	Stadium: Yankee Stadium; Attendance: 23,352; Referee: Silviu Petrescu

April 30, 2016 9	New York City FC	3–2	Vancouver Whitecaps FC	New York, New York
4:00 PM EDT	Villa 35', 41'; Lopez (yellow card) 46'; Mendoza 73'; Bravo (yellow card) 80'; Matarrita (yellow card) 90+4'	Report	Rivero 1'; Bolaños 63'; Kah (yellow card) 90+4'	Stadium: Yankee Stadium; Attendance: 25,438; Referee: Sorin Stoica

May 8, 2016 10	D.C. United	0–2	New York City FC	Washington, D.C.
7:30 PM EDT	Acosta (yellow card) 3'; Jeffrey (yellow card) 47'; Buescher (yellow card) 90+4'	Report	Villa 49'; Shelton 53'; Brillant (yellow card) 59'; Saunders (yellow card) 78'; Bravo (yellow card) 79'	Stadium: RFK Stadium; Attendance: 14,504; Referee: Allen Chapman

May 15, 2016 11	Portland Timbers	1–2	New York City FC	Portland, Oregon
7:30 PM EDT	Zemanski (yellow card) 38'; Adi 55'	Report	Villa 12'; Allen (yellow card) 24'; McNamara 65'; Saunders (yellow card) 87'	Stadium: Providence Park; Attendance: 21,144; Referee: Hilario Grajeda

May 18, 2016 12	Toronto FC	1–1	New York City FC	Toronto, Ontario
7:00 PM EDT	Bradley (yellow card) 39'; Johnson 42'	Report	Poku 16'; Mullins (yellow card) 19'; Bravo (yellow card) 56'; Diskerud (yellow card) 70'; Villa (yellow card) 85'	Stadium: BMO Field; Attendance: 30,262; Referee: Sorin Stoica

May 21, 2016 13	New York City FC	0–7	New York Red Bulls	New York, New York
3:35 PM EDT	Lopez (yellow card) 16'; Bravo (yellow card) 30'; McNamara (yellow card) 37'	report	McCarty 3', 51'; Wright-Phillips 42', 45+2'; Muyl 56'; Lade (yellow card) 73'; Verón 83'; Verón (yellow card) 84'; Baah 89'	Stadium: Yankee Stadium; Attendance: 37,858; Referee: Chris Penso

May 29, 2016 14	New York City FC	2–2	Orlando City SC	New York, New York
4:30 PM EDT	Brillant 42'; Allen (yellow card) 65'; Villa 66'; Saunders (yellow card) 87'; Villa (yellow card) 90+3'	report	Carrasco (yellow card) 8'; Heath (yellow card) 10'; Alston (yellow card) 62'; Hines (yellow card) 69'; Baptista 72'; Shea (yellow card) 90+3'; Molino 90+4'	Stadium: Yankee Stadium; Attendance: 25,039; Referee: Jorge González

June 2, 2016 15	New York City FC	2–3	Real Salt Lake	New York, New York
7:00 PM EDT	Pirlo (yellow card) 27'; Harrison 56'; Villa 87' (pen.)	report	Phillips (yellow card) 14'; Mulholland (yellow card) 17'; Wingert (yellow card) 51'; Movsisyan 59'; Martínez 67'; Brillant 74' (o.g.); Morales (yellow card) 86'	Stadium: Yankee Stadium; Attendance: 22,736; Referee: Ted Unkel

June 18, 2016 16	New York City FC	3–2	Philadelphia Union	New York, New York
1:00 PM EDT	Lampard 8' (yellow card) 43'; Villa 21'; Allen (yellow card) 45'; Pirlo 50'; Hernandez (yellow card) 54' (yellow-red card) 85'; Matarrita (yellow card) 90+5'	Report	Barnetta (yellow card) 31'; Gaddis (yellow card) 49'; Alberg 55' (pen.); Brillant 88' (o.g.)	Stadium: Yankee Stadium; Attendance: 27,456; Referee: Silviu Petrescu

June 25, 2016 17	Seattle Sounders FC	0–2	New York City FC	Seattle
5:00 PM EDT		report	Lampard 38'; McNamara (yellow card) 42'; Iraola (yellow card) 75'; Mataritta 87'	Stadium: CenturyLink Field; Attendance: 47,537; Referee: Alan Kelly

July 3, 2016 18	New York City FC	2–0	New York Red Bulls	New York, New York
12:00 PM EDT	Harrison 8'; Allen (yellow card) 45'; Villa 66'; Pirlo (yellow card) 76'	report	Felipe (yellow card) 30'; Wright-Phillips (yellow card) 78'; Duvall (red card) 79'; Collin (yellow card) 90+1'	Stadium: Yankee Stadium; Attendance: 33,613; Referee: Hilario Grajedo

July 6, 2016 19	New England Revolution	0–1	New York City FC	Foxborough, Massachusetts
7:30 PM EDT	Watson (yellow card) 70'; Shuttleworth (red card) 90+4'	report	Lampard 58'	Stadium: Gillette Stadium; Attendance: 18,187; Referee: David Gantar

July 10, 2016 20	Sporting Kansas City	3–1	New York City FC	Kansas City, Kansas
8:00 PM EDT	Feilhaber 8'; Medranda 16'; Opara 51'	report	Lampard 14'; Villa (yellow card) 83'	Stadium: Children's Mercy Park; Attendance: 19,881; Referee: Ismail Elfath

July 17, 2016 21	Montreal Impact	1–3	New York City FC	Montreal
5:00 PM EDT	Camara (yellow card) 50'; Shipp 55'; Ontivero (yellow card) 61'; Cabrera (yellow card) 74'	report	Villa 35'; Harrison 45+2'; Lopez (yellow card) 72'; Lampard 85'; Saunders (yellow card) 88'	Stadium: Stade Saputo; Attendance: 20,801; Referee: Armando Villarreal

July 24, 2016 22	New York Red Bulls	4–1	New York City FC	Harrison, New Jersey
1:00 PM EDT	Wright-Phillips 20', 70'; Zubar 23'; Kljestan 41' (pen.); Zubar (yellow card) 55'; Grella (yellow card) 58'		White (yellow card) 13'; McNamara 43'; Allen (yellow card) 65'; Lampard (yellow card) 85'; Bravo (yellow card) 88'; White (red card) 89'; Villa (yellow card) 90'	Stadium: Red Bull Arena; Attendance: 25,218; Referee: Mark Geiger

July 30, 2016 23	New York City FC	5–1	Colorado Rapids	New York, New York
3:00 PM EDT	Lampard 28', 81', 84' (pen.), (yellow card) 32'; Martinez (yellow card) 32'; Taylor 42'; Mendoza 75'	Report	Azira (yellow card) 21' (yellow-red card) 37'; Watts (yellow card) 23'; Gashi 90+2'	Stadium: Yankee Stadium; Attendance: 25,711; Referee: Baldomero Toledo

August 5, 2016 24	San Jose Earthquakes	0–0	New York City FC	San Jose, California
11:00 PM EDT		Report		Stadium: Avaya Stadium; Attendance: 18,000; Referee: Ricardo Salazar

August 13, 2016 25	Columbus Crew	3–3	New York City FC	Columbus, Ohio
7:30 PM EDT	Meram 49'; Finlay 80' (pen.), 90+5'; Tchani (yellow card) 90+1'	Report	Lampard 41'; Villa 83', 90+2' (pen.)	Stadium: Mapfre Stadium; Attendance: 18,189; Referee: Sorin Stoica

August 20, 2016 26	New York City FC	1–0	LA Galaxy	New York, New York
3:30 PM EDT	Villa 6'	Report	DeLaGarza (yellow card) 90+3'	Stadium: Yankee Stadium; Attendance: 35,509; Referee: Jair Marrufo

August 28, 2016 27	Orlando City SC	2–1	New York City FC	Orlando, Florida
7:00 PM EDT	Kaká 32', 63' (pen.); Nocerino (yellow card) 80'	Report	Chanot (yellow card) 54'; Mendoza 55'; McNamara (yellow card) 59'	Stadium: Camping World Stadium; Attendance: 27,482; Referee: Robert Sibiga

September 1, 2016 28	New York City FC	3–2	D.C. United	New York, New York
7:00 PM EDT	Villa 79'; Lampard 85', 90+3'	Report	Acosta (yellow card) 33'; Sam 36'; Vincent (yellow card) 58'; Neagle 90+3'	Stadium: Yankee Stadium; Attendance: 23,768; Referee: Chris Penso

September 10, 2016 29	New England Revolution	3–1	New York City FC	Foxborough, Massachusetts
8:00 PM EDT	Agudelo 21'; Nguyen 42'; Fagúndez 58'; Koffie (yellow card) 69'	Report	Mena (yellow card) 20'; Lampard 49'; Allen (yellow card) 72'; Mendoza (yellow card) 86'; Bravo (red card) 86'	Stadium: Gillette Stadium; Attendance: 23,235; Referee: Juan Guzmán

September 17, 2016 30	New York City FC	2–2	FC Dallas	New York, New York
7:00 PM EDT	McNamara 8'; Allen (yellow card) 14'; Shelton 78'	Report	Urruti 20'; Hollingshead (yellow card) 28'; Figueroa (yellow card) 31'; Barrios 52'; Acosta (yellow card) 73'; Gruezo (yellow card) 88'	Stadium: Yankee Stadium; Attendance: 25,204; Referee: Alan Kelly

September 23, 2016 31	New York City FC	4–1	Chicago Fire	New York, New York
8:00 PM EDT	Mena 8'; Villa 9', 83'; Mendoza 44'; Brillant (yellow card) 72'	Report	Solignac 35'	Stadium: Yankee Stadium; Attendance: 25,011; Referee: Jaime Herrera Garduño

September 30, 2016 32	Houston Dynamo	0–2	New York City FC	Houston, Texas
8:00 PM EDT	Rodríguez (yellow card) 57'	Report	Villa 52', 90+1'; McNamara (yellow card) 62'	Stadium: BBVA Compass Stadium; Attendance: 19,616; Referee: Robert Sibiga

October 16, 2016 33	D.C. United	3–1	New York City FC	Washington, D.C.
3:00 PM EDT	Mullins 27'; Boswell 31'; Vincent 45'; DeLeon (yellow card) 75'	Report	Pirlo (yellow card) 53'; Villa 72' (pen.)	Stadium: Robert F. Kennedy Memorial Stadium; Attendance: 30,943; Referee: Alan Kelly

October 23, 2016 34	New York City FC	4–1	Columbus Crew SC	New York, New York
4:00 PM EDT	Chanot (yellow card) 25'; Mendoza 45'; Harrison 74'; Shelton 77'; Villa 90+3'	Report	Kamara 59'; Tchani (yellow card) 79'	Stadium: Yankee Stadium; Attendance: 30,374; Referee: Jose Carlos Rivero

==== MLS Cup Playoffs ====
October 30, 2016 Conference Semifinals Leg 1	Toronto FC	2–0	New York City FC	Toronto
7:00 PM EDT	Cooper (yellow card) 23'; Altidore 84'; Ricketts 90+2'	Report	Harrison (yellow card) 33'; Chanot (yellow card) 44'; Lopez (yellow card) 58'; Bravo (yellow card) 65'; Lampard (yellow card) 73'	Stadium: BMO Field; Attendance: 28,220; Referee: Silviu Petrescu

November 6, 2016 Conference Semifinals Leg 2	New York City FC	0–5	Toronto FC	New York, New York
6:30 PM EST		Report	Giovinco 6', 20' (pen.), 90+1'; Altidore 30'; Osorio 50'	Stadium: Yankee Stadium; Attendance: 28,355; Referee: Kevin Stott

==== U.S. Open Cup ====
June 15, 2016 Fourth round	New York City FC	0–1	New York Cosmos	New York, New York
7:30 PM EDT	Mena (yellow card) 44'; White (yellow card) 52'	Report	Arango (yellow card) 43'; Szetela (yellow card) 53', (goal) 88'	Stadium: Coffey Field; Attendance: 4,500; Referee: Jorge González

== Squad information ==
As of October 23, 2016

Squad No.	Name	Nationality	Position(s)	Since	Date of birth (age)	Signed from	Games played	Goals scored
Goalkeepers
12	Josh Saunders	(Puerto Rico)	GK	2014	March 2, 1981 (aged 35)	(United States) Real Salt Lake	66	0
24	Andre Rawls	(United States)	GK	2016	December 20, 1991 (aged 24)	(United States) Wilmington Hammerheads	0	0
25	Eirik Johansen	(Norway)	GK	2015	July 12, 1992 (aged 24)	(England) Manchester City	7	0
Defenders
2	Jason Hernandez	(Puerto Rico)	CB	2014	August 23, 1983 (aged 33)	(United States) San Jose Earthquakes	59	0
3	Ethan White	(United States)	CB	2016	January 1, 1991 (aged 25)	(United States) Philadelphia Union	14	0
4	Maxime Chanot	(Luxembourg)	CB	2016	January 21, 1990 (aged 26)	(Belgium) Kortrijk	8	0
13	Frédéric Brillant	(France)	CB	2016	June 26, 1985 (aged 31)	(Belgium) Oostende	33	1
22	Rónald Matarrita	(Costa Rica)	LB	2016	July 9, 1994 (aged 22)	(Costa Rica) Alajuelense	27	1
23	Jefferson Mena	(Colombia)	CB	2015	June 15, 1989 (aged 27)	(Colombia) Independiente Medellín	24	1
27	R. J. Allen	(United States)	RB	2015	April 17, 1990 (aged 26)	(Denmark) Skive	41	1
30	Diego Martínez	(Argentina)	LB	2016	July 5, 1992 (aged 24)	(Argentina) River Plate	4	0
51	Andoni Iraola	(Spain)	RB	2015	June 22, 1982 (aged 34)	(Spain) Athletic Bilbao	40	0
52	Shannon Gomez	(Trinidad and Tobago)	RB	2016	October 5, 1996 (aged 20)	(Trinidad and Tobago) W Connection	1	0
Midfielders
5	Mikey Lopez	(United States)	CM	2016	February 20, 1993 (aged 23)	(United States) Sporting Kansas City	17	0
6	Federico Bravo	(Argentina)	CM	2016	October 5, 1993 (aged 23)	(Argentina) Boca Juniors	23	0
8	Frank Lampard	(England)	CM	2015	June 20, 1978 (aged 38)	(England) Manchester City	31	15
10	Mix Diskerud	(United States)	CM	2015	October 2, 1990 (aged 26)	(Norway) Rosenborg	41	4
11	Jack Harrison	(England)	RM	2016	November 20, 1996 (aged 19)	(United States) Wake Forest	23	4
15	Tommy McNamara	(United States)	AM	2014	February 6, 1991 (aged 25)	(United States) D.C. United	50	10
16	Connor Brandt	(United States)	CM	2015	September 15, 1992 (aged 24)	(United States) Tucson	1	0
20	Mehdi Ballouchy	(Morocco)	LM	2014	April 6, 1983 (aged 33)	(Canada) Vancouver Whitecaps FC	24	3
21	Andrea Pirlo	(Italy)	CM	2015	May 19, 1979 (aged 37)	(Italy) Juventus	46	1
Strikers
7	David Villa (captain)	(Spain)	CF	2014	December 3, 1981 (aged 34)	(Spain) Atlético Madrid	65	41
9	Steven Mendoza	(Colombia)	CF	2016	June 27, 1992 (aged 24)	(Brazil) Corinthians	25	5
19	Khiry Shelton	(United States)	CF	2015	June 26, 1993 (aged 23)	(United States) Oregon State	42	5
99	Tony Taylor	(Panama)	CF	2014	July 13, 1989 (aged 27)	(United States) New England Revolution	16	2

== Statistics ==
=== Appearances and goals ===
No.	Pos	Nat	Player	Total		MLS		MLS Cup Playoffs		U.S. Open Cup	
No.	Pos	Nat	Player	Apps	Goals	Apps	Goals	Apps	Goals	Apps	Goals
2	DF	(Puerto Rico) PUR	Jason Hernandez	32	0	26+5	0	0+0	0	0+1	0
3	DF	(United States) USA	Ethan White	14	0	7+6	0	0+0	0	1+0	0
4	DF	(Luxembourg) LUX	Maxime Chanot	8	0	5+1	0	2+0	0	0+0	0
5	MF	(United States) USA	Mikey Lopez	17	0	6+9	0	1+0	0	1+0	0
6	MF	(Argentina) ARG	Federico Bravo	23	0	11+10	0	2+0	0	0+0	0
7	FW	(Spain) ESP	David Villa	33	23	30+1	23	2+0	0	0+0	0
8	MF	(England) ENG	Frank Lampard	21	12	15+4	12	2+0	0	0+0	0
9	FW	(Colombia) COL	Steven Mendoza	24	4	10+13	4	1+0	0	0+0	0
10	MF	(United States) USA	Mix Diskerud	13	1	9+3	1	0+0	0	1+0	0
11	MF	(England) ENG	Jack Harrison	24	3	16+5	3	2+0	0	0+1	0
12	GK	(Puerto Rico) PUR	Josh Saunders	33	0	33+0	0	0+0	0	0+0	0
13	DF	(France) FRA	Frédéric Brillant	31	1	29+0	1	2+0	0	0+0	0
15	MF	(United States) USA	Tommy McNamara	30	5	27+2	5	1+0	0	0+0	0
16	MF	(United States) USA	Connor Brandt	0	0	0+0	0	0+0	0	0+0	0
19	FW	(United States) USA	Khiry Shelton	24	4	12+9	4	2+0	0	1+0	0
20	MF	(Morocco) MAR	Mehdi Ballouchy	5	0	1+3	0	0+0	0	1+0	0
21	MF	(Italy) ITA	Andrea Pirlo	33	1	32+0	1	1+0	0	0+0	0
22	DF	(Costa Rica) CRC	Rónald Matarrita	27	1	23+2	1	2+0	0	0+0	0
23	DF	(Colombia) COL	Jefferson Mena	17	1	16+0	1	0+0	0	1+0	0
24	GK	(United States) USA	Andre Rawls	0	0	0+0	0	0+0	0	0+0	0
25	GK	(Norway) NOR	Eirik Johansen	4	0	1+0	0	2+0	0	1+0	0
27	DF	(United States) USA	R. J. Allen	26	1	19+5	1	2+0	0	0+0	0
30	DF	(Argentina) ARG	Diego Martínez	4	0	2+1	0	0+0	0	1+0	0
51	DF	(Spain) ESP	Andoni Iraola	31	0	25+4	0	2+0	0	0+0	0
52	DF	(Trinidad and Tobago) TRI	Shannon Gomez	1	0	0+0	0	0+0	0	1+0	0
99	FW	(United States) USA	Tony Taylor	16	2	7+6	2	2+0	0	0+1	0
Players who appeared for New York City FC who are no longer at the club:
4	MF	(United States) USA	Andrew Jacobson	0	0	0+0	0	0+0	0	0+0	0
14	FW	(United States) USA	Patrick Mullins	8	0	2+5	0	0+0	0	1+0	0
88	MF	(Ghana) GHA	Kwadwo Poku	8	1	3+4	1	0+0	0	1+0	0

== Transfers ==
=== In ===
No.	Pos.	Nat.	Name	Age	US	Moving from	Type	Transfer window	Ends	Transfer fee	Source
3	DF	(United States)	Ethan White	24	US	(United States) Philadelphia Union	Trade	Winter 2016		2017 SuperDraft 4th Round pick	NYCFC.com
11	MF	(England)	Jack Harrison	19	Non-US	(United States) Wake Forest Demon Deacons	Draft	Winter 2016		SuperDraft	NYCFC.com
22	DF	(Costa Rica)	Rónald Matarrita	21	Non-US	(Costa Rica) Alajuelense	Transfer	Winter 2016		Undisc. (TAM)	NYCFC.com
30	DF	(Argentina)	Diego Martínez	23	Non-US	(Argentina) River Plate	Transfer	Winter 2016		Free	NYCFC.com
5	MF	(United States)	Mikey Lopez	22	US	(United States) Sporting Kansas City	Waiver	Winter 2016		Free	NYCFC.com
13	DF	(France)	Frédéric Brillant	30	Non-US	(Belgium) Oostende	Transfer	Winter 2016		Undisc. (TAM)	NYCFC.com
24	GK	(United States)	Andre Rawls	24	US	(United States) Wilmington Hammerheads	Transfer	Winter 2016		Free	NYCFC.com
4	CB	(Luxembourg)	Maxime Chanot	25	Non-US	(Belgium) Kortrijk	Transfer	Summer 2016		Undisclosed	

==== Loan in ====
No.	Pos.	Player	Loaned from	Start	End	Source
6	MF	(Argentina) Federico Bravo	(Argentina) Boca Juniors	February 20, 2016	December 31, 2016	NYCFC.com
52	DF	(Trinidad and Tobago) Shannon Gomez	(Trinidad and Tobago) W Connection	March 3. 2016	December 31, 2016	NYCFC.com
9	FW	(Colombia) Steven Mendoza	(Brazil) Corinthians	March 11. 2016	December 31, 2016	NYCFC.com

=== Out ===
No.	Pos.	Nat.	Name	Age	US	Moving to	Type	Transfer window	Transfer fee	Source
4	MF	(United States)	Andrew Jacobson	29	US	(Canada) Vancouver Whitecaps FC	Trade	Winter	Undisc. (TAM)	NYCFC.com
88	FW	(Ghana)	Kwadwo Poku	24	US	(United States) Miami FC	Transfer	Summer	Undisc.	NYCFC.com
14	MF	(United States)	Patrick Mullins	24	US	(United States) D.C. United	Trade	Summer	Undisc. (TAM) (GAM) (Intl. Spot)	NYCFC.com

==== Loan out ====
No.	Pos.	Player	Loaned to	Start	End	Source

=== Non-player transfers ===
Acquired	From	For	Source
International Roster Spot	Sporting Kansas City	Undisc. (TAM)	NYCFC.com

== Honors ==
=== MLS Player of the month ===
Month	Player
July	(England) Frank Lampard

=== MLS Player of the week ===
Week	Player
17	(England) Jack Harrison
21	(England) Frank Lampard
26	(England) Frank Lampard

=== MLS Team of the week ===
Week	Player
1	(United States) Tommy McNamara
2	(Spain) David Villa
4	(United States) Tommy McNamara (Argentina) Federico Bravo
6	(Costa Rica) Rónald Matarrita
9	(Spain) David Villa
10	(Costa Rica) Rónald Matarrita
11	(Spain) David Villa (Puerto Rico) Jason Hernandez
13	(United States) R. J. Allen
15	(Spain) David Villa (England) Jack Harrison
16	(Costa Rica) Rónald Matarrita
17	(England) Jack Harrison
19	(Spain) David Villa
21	(England) Frank Lampard (United States) Tommy McNamara
22	(Luxembourg) Maxime Chanot
23	(Spain) David Villa
24	(Costa Rica) Rónald Matarrita
26	(England) Frank Lampard
28	(England) Jack Harrison
29	(Spain) David Villa (United States) Khiry Shelton
30	(Spain) David Villa

=== MLS Goal of the week ===
Week	Player
4	(United States) Tommy McNamara
19	(England) Jack Harrison
30	(Spain) David Villa
34	(Spain) David Villa

=== Fans' player of the month ===
Awarded to the player who receives the most votes in a poll conducted each month on the NYCFC website

Month	Player
March	(United States) Tommy McNamara
April	(Spain) David Villa
May	(United States) R. J. Allen
June	(England) Jack Harrison
July	(England) Frank Lampard
August	(Spain) David Villa
September	(Spain) David Villa
October	(France) Frédéric Brillant
