= 2017 New York City FC season =

New York City FC
2017 season
- Owner: City Football Group (80%); Yankee Global Enterprises (20%)
- CEO: Ferran Soriano
- Head coach: Patrick Vieira
- Stadium: Yankee Stadium; The Bronx, New York (16 of 18 league matches); Rentschler Field; East Hartford, Connecticut; Citi Field; Queens, New York (One match each due to scheduling conflicts with Yankees)
- MLS: Conference: 2nd Overall: 2nd
- MLS Cup Playoffs: Conference Semi-Finals
- U.S. Open Cup: Fourth Round
- Top goalscorer: League: David Villa (22); All: David Villa (24)
- Highest home attendance: 33,679 (Aug 6 vs. New York Red Bulls)
- Lowest home attendance: 10,165 (Sep 3 vs. Houston Dynamo)* * in East Hartford, Connecticut
- Average home league attendance: 22,321 (regular season); 22,372 (including playoffs)
- Biggest win: 4 goals: NYC 4–0 DC (March 12)
- Biggest defeat: 4 goals: TOR 4–0 NYC (July 30)
Home colors	Away colors

The 2017 New York City FC season was the club's third season of competition and their third in the top tier of American soccer, Major League Soccer (MLS). New York City FC played their home games at Yankee Stadium in the New York City borough of The Bronx.

== Roster ==
As of October 26, 2017

Squad No.	Name	Nationality	Position(s)	Since	Date of birth (age)	Signed from	Games played	Goals scored
Goalkeepers
1	Sean Johnson	(United States)	GK	2016	May 31, 1989 (aged 28)	(United States) Chicago Fire	35	0
24	Andre Rawls	(United States)	GK	2016	December 20, 1991 (aged 25)	(United States) Wilmington Hammerheads	0	0
25	Eirik Johansen	(Norway)	GK	2015	July 12, 1992 (aged 25)	(England) Manchester City	9	0
Defenders
2	Ben Sweat	(United States)	LB	2017	September 4, 1991 (aged 26)	(United States) Tampa Bay Rowdies	29	1
3	Ethan White	(United States)	CB	2016	January 1, 1991 (aged 26)	(United States) Philadelphia Union	35	0
4	Maxime Chanot	(Luxembourg)	CB	2016	January 21, 1990 (aged 27)	(Belgium) Kortrijk	27	2
6	Alexander Callens	(Peru)	CB	2017	May 4, 1992 (aged 25)	(Spain) Numancia	36	2
13	Frédéric Brillant	(France)	CB	2016	June 26, 1985 (aged 32)	(Belgium) Oostende	59	2
22	Rónald Matarrita	(Costa Rica)	LB	2016	July 9, 1994 (aged 23)	(Costa Rica) Alajuelense	41	1
27	R. J. Allen	(United States)	RB	2015	April 17, 1990 (aged 27)	(Denmark) Skive	56	1
52	Shannon Gomez	(Trinidad and Tobago)	RB	2016	October 5, 1996 (aged 21)	(Trinidad and Tobago) W Connection	0	0
16	James Sands	(United States)	CB	2017	July 6, 2000 (aged 17)	(United States) NYCFC Academy	1	0
32	Andraž Struna	(Slovenia)	CB	2017	April 23, 1989 (aged 28)	Free agent	7	1
Midfielders
5	Mikey Lopez	(United States)	CM	2016	February 20, 1993 (aged 24)	(United States) Sporting Kansas City	30	0
8	Alexander Ring	(Finland)	CM	2017	April 9, 1991 (aged 26)	(Germany) Kaiserslautern	32	0
10	Maximiliano Moralez	(Argentina)	AM	2017	February 27, 1987 (aged 30)	(Mexico) León	32	5
11	Jack Harrison	(England)	RM	2016	November 20, 1996 (aged 20)	(United States) Wake Forest	60	14
12	John Stertzer	(United States)	CM	2017	October 4, 1990 (aged 27)	(United States) Real Salt Lake	6	0
14	Kwame Awuah	(Canada)	CM	2017	December 2, 1995 (aged 21)	(United States) Connecticut	5	0
15	Tommy McNamara	(United States)	AM	2014	February 6, 1991 (aged 26)	(United States) D.C. United	78	14
21	Andrea Pirlo	(Italy)	CM	2015	May 19, 1979 (aged 38)	(Italy) Juventus	62	1
30	Yangel Herrera	(Venezuela)	MF	2017	January 7, 1998 (aged 19)	(England) Manchester City	20	1
99	Miguel Camargo	(Panama)	AM	2017	May 9, 1993 (aged 24)	(Panama) Chorrillo	8	1
Strikers
7	David Villa (captain)	(Spain)	CF	2014	December 3, 1981 (aged 35)	(Spain) Atlético Madrid	99	65
9	Sean Okoli	(United States)	CF	2016	February 3, 1993 (aged 24)	(United States) Cincinnati	17	1
17	Jonathan Lewis	(United States)	CF	2017	June 4, 1997 (aged 20)	(United States) Akron	13	2
19	Khiry Shelton	(United States)	CF	2015	June 26, 1993 (aged 24)	(United States) Oregon State	57	6
23	Rodney Wallace	(Costa Rica)	CF	2017	June 17, 1988 (aged 29)	(Brazil) Sport Recife	28	4

== Player movement ==
=== In ===
Per Major League Soccer and club policies, terms of the deals do not get disclosed.

No.	Pos.	Player	Transferred from	Fee/notes	Date	Source
9	FW	(United States) Sean Okoli	(United States) FC Cincinnati	Free transfer	December 5, 2016	
1	GK	(United States) Sean Johnson	(United States) Chicago Fire	Trade for TAM	December 11, 2016	
6	DF	(Peru) Alexander Callens	(Spain) Numancia	Transfer	January 27, 2017	
8	MF	(Finland) Alexander Ring	(Germany) Kaiserslautern	Transfer	February 1, 2017	
10	MF	(Argentina) Maximiliano Moralez	(Mexico) León	Transfer	February 15, 2017	
23	FW	(Costa Rica) Rodney Wallace	(Brazil) Sport Recife	Transfer	February 15, 2017	
12	MF	(United States) John Stertzer	(United States) Real Salt Lake	Free transfer	February 16, 2017	
2	DF	(United States) Ben Sweat	(United States) Tampa Bay Rowdies	Free transfer	February 23, 2017	
32	DF	(Slovenia) Andraž Struna	Free agent	Free transfer	September 6, 2017	

=== Out ===
No.	Pos.	Player	Transferred to	Fee/notes	Date	Source
8	MF	(England) Frank Lampard	—N/a	Retirement after the end of contract	November 14, 2016	
51	DF	(Spain) Andoni Iraola	—N/a	Retired	November 17, 2016	
20	MF	(Morocco) Mehdi Ballouchy	—N/a	Retired	November 18, 2016	
9	FW	(Colombia) Stiven Mendoza	(Brazil) Corinthians	End of loan	November 28, 2016	
6	MD	(Argentina) Federico Bravo	(Argentina) Boca Juniors	End of loan	November 28, 2016	
99	FW	(Panama) Tony Taylor	(Portugal) Paços de Ferreira	End of contract	November 28, 2016	
2	DF	(Puerto Rico) Jason Hernandez	(Canada) Toronto FC	End of contract	November 28, 2016	
30	DF	(Argentina) Diego Martínez	(Argentina) Sportivo Estudiantes	End of contract	November 28, 2016	
12	GK	(Puerto Rico) Josh Saunders	(United States) Orlando City SC	Trade	January 27, 2017	
10	MF	(United States) Mix Diskerud	(Sweden) IFK Göteborg	Contract buyout	March 2, 2017	

=== Loans ===
Per Major League Soccer and club policies, terms of the deals do not get disclosed.

==== In ====
Date	Player	Position	Loaned from	Notes	Ref
January 11, 2017	(Panama) Miguel Camargo	MF	(Panama) Chorrillo	Season-long loan w/ option to buy	
February 14, 2017	(Venezuela) Yangel Herrera	MF	(England) Manchester City	Season-long loan	

==== Out ====
Date	Player	Position	Loaned too	Notes	Ref
January 5, 2017	(Colombia) Jefferson Mena	DF	(Ecuador) Barcelona	Season-long loan	

=== Draft picks ===
Round	#	Position	Player	College/Club Team	Reference
1 (3)	17	F	(United States) Jonathan Lewis	Akron	
1 (16)	14	MF	(Canada) Kwame Awuah	Connecticut	
2 (38)	-	F	(United States) Jalen Brown	Xavier	
3 (54)	-	MF	(Norway) Chris Wingate	New Hampshire	
3 (60)	-	DF	(United States) Michael DeGraffenriedt	Louisville	

== Preseason and Friendlies ==
February 2	Jacksonville Dolphins	0–9	New York City FC	Jacksonville, Florida
12:00PM EST		Report	Stertzer 5'; White 7'; Brown 21'; Villa 32', 34' (pen.); Lewis 45+1'; Harrison 49'; Awuah 77'; Louima 79'	Stadium: Southern Oak Stadium

February 8	Emelec	2–2	New York City FC	Guayaquil, Ecuador
4:00PM EST	Preciado 41', 54'	Report	Okoli 83'; Stertzer 90+2'	Stadium: Estadio George Capwell; Attendance: 40,000

February 15 Desert Diamond Cup	New York City FC	0–2	New York Red Bulls	Tucson, Arizona
4:00PM EST		Report	Kljestan 23', 43'	Stadium: Kino Veterans Memorial Stadium

February 18 Desert Diamond Cup	New York City FC	1–3	Houston Dynamo	Tucson, Arizona
8:00PM EST				Stadium: Kino Veterans Memorial Stadium

February 22 Desert Diamond Cup	New York City FC	0–1	Colorado Rapids	Tucson, Arizona
1:00PM EST				Stadium: Kino Veterans Memorial Stadium

February 25 Desert Diamond Cup	New York City FC	1–0	Sporting Kansas City	Tucson, Arizona
TBD				Stadium: Kino Veterans Memorial Stadium

== Major League Soccer season ==
=== Eastern Conference ===
Pos	Team	Pld	W	L	T	GF	GA	GD	Pts	Qualification
1	Toronto FC	34	20	5	9	74	37	+37	69	MLS Cup Conference Semifinals
2	New York City FC	34	16	9	9	56	43	+13	57	MLS Cup Conference Semifinals
3	Chicago Fire	34	16	11	7	62	48	+14	55	MLS Cup Knockout Round
4	Atlanta United FC	34	15	9	10	70	40	+30	55	MLS Cup Knockout Round
5	Columbus Crew	34	16	12	6	53	49	+4	54	MLS Cup Knockout Round
6	New York Red Bulls	34	14	12	8	53	47	+6	50	MLS Cup Knockout Round

Source: MLS

=== Overall ===
Pos	Team	Pld	W	L	T	GF	GA	GD	Pts	Qualification
1	Toronto FC (C, S)	34	20	5	9	74	37	+37	69	CONCACAF Champions League
2	New York City FC	34	16	9	9	56	43	+13	57	
3	Chicago Fire	34	16	11	7	61	47	+14	55	
4	Atlanta United FC	34	15	9	10	70	40	+30	55	

Source: MLS
Rules for classification: 1) points; 2) total wins; 3) total goal differential; 4) total goals scored; 5) disciplinary points; 6) away goals scored; 7) away goal differential; 8) coin toss or drawing of lots
(C) MLS Cup Champion; (S) Supporters' Shield

=== Results summary ===
Overall								Home						Away					
Pld	W	D	L	GF	GA	GD	Pts	W	D	L	GF	GA	GD	W	D	L	GF	GA	GD
34	16	9	9	56	43	+13	57	10	5	2	33	20	+13	6	4	7	23	23	0

Last updated: October 22, 2017.
Source: MLS

=== Matches ===
March 5 1	Orlando City SC	1–0	New York City FC	Orlando, Florida
1:00 PM EST	Larin 15'; Johnson (yellow card) 61'	Report	Wallace (yellow card) 30'; Ring (yellow card) 67'	Stadium: Orlando City Stadium; Attendance: 25,527; Referee: Jair Marrufo

March 12 2	New York City FC	4–0	D.C. United	New York, New York
2:00 PM EDT	Wallace 8'; Villa 28', 75'; Moralez 39'	Report	Birnbaum (yellow card) 24'; Jeffrey (yellow card) 35'; DeLeon (yellow card) 63'; Vincent (yellow card) 77'; Neagle (yellow card) 85'	Stadium: Yankee Stadium; Attendance: 24,259; Referee: Alan Kelly

March 18 3	New York City FC	1–1	Montreal Impact	New York, New York
2:00 PM EDT	Wallace 44'; Chanot (yellow card) 86'	Report	Bernardello (yellow card) 57'; Oduro 68'	Stadium: Yankee Stadium; Attendance: 18,515; Referee: Mark Geiger

April 1 4	New York City FC	2–1	San Jose Earthquakes	New York, New York
2:00 PM EDT	Harrison 10', (yellow card) 86'; Ring (yellow card) 54'; Wallace (yellow card) 59'; McNamara 67'	Report	Ureña 6'; Bernárdez (red card) 80'	Stadium: Yankee Stadium; Attendance: 20,066; Referee: Jorge González

April 8 5	D.C. United	2–1	New York City FC	Washington, D.C.
4:00 PM EDT	Sam 53'; Acosta 73'	Report	Callens (yellow card) 11'; Matarrita (yellow card) 35'; Villa 84'	Stadium: RFK Stadium; Attendance: 18,855; Referee: Drew Fischer

April 14 6	Philadelphia Union	0–2	New York City FC	Chester, Pennsylvania
7:00 PM EDT	Elliott (yellow card) 25'	Report	Ring (yellow card) 43'; Harrison 52'; Matarrita (yellow card) 55'; Villa 90'	Stadium: Talen Energy Stadium; Attendance: 16,553; Referee: Jose Carlos Rivero

April 23 7	New York City FC	1–2	Orlando City SC	New York, New York
1:30 PM EDT	Moralez (yellow card) 2'; Pirlo (yellow card) 45'; Villa (yellow card) 54', (goal) 74'; White (yellow card) 59'	Report	Larin 31', 51', (yellow card) 90+3'; Higuita (yellow card) 57'; Redding (yellow card) 72'; Nocerino (yellow card) 82'	Stadium: Yankee Stadium; Attendance: 22,470; Referee: Jair Marrufo

April 29 8	Columbus Crew	2–3	New York City FC	Columbus, Ohio
7:30 PM EDT	Higuaín 29'; Raitala (yellow card) 44'; Kamara 49'	Report	Sweat (yellow card) 2'; Harrison 8', 76'; Herrera (yellow card) 17', (goal) 64'; Chanot (yellow card) 79'	Stadium: Mapfre Stadium; Attendance: 17,336; Referee: Chris Penso

May 7 9	New York City FC	3–1	Atlanta United FC	New York, New York
4:00 PM EDT	Villa 17'; White (yellow card) 50'; Wallace 60'; Moralez 61'	Report	Gressel (yellow card) 34'; Carmona 39'; Parkhurst (yellow card) 43'; Larentowicz (yellow card) 69'; Mears (yellow card) 82'	Stadium: Yankee Stadium; Attendance: 25,605; Referee: Ismail Elfath

May 14 10	FC Dallas	1–1	New York City FC	Frisco, Texas
8:00 PM EDT	Acosta 20'; Gruezo (yellow card) 68'	Report	McNamara (yellow card) 34', (goal) 68'; Ring (yellow card) 51'; Sweat (yellow card) 88'	Stadium: Toyota Stadium; Attendance: 14,665; Referee: Robert Sibiga

May 19 11	Real Salt Lake	2–1	New York City FC	Sandy, Utah
9:00 PM EDT	Movsisyan (yellow card) 16'; Schuler (yellow card) 23'; Rusnák 38'; Maund 51'	Report	Okoli 4'; White (yellow card) 21'; McNamara (yellow card) 45'	Stadium: Rio Tinto Stadium; Attendance: 16,434; Referee: Silviu Petrescu

May 21 12	Orlando City SC	0–3	New York City FC	Orlando, Florida
7:00 PM EDT	Rivas (yellow card) 34'; Pereira (yellow card) 90+2'	Report	Villa 14', 82'; Lopez (yellow card) 19'; Wallace 35'; Moralez (yellow card) 45+1'	Stadium: Orlando City Stadium; Attendance: 25,527; Referee: Mark Geiger

May 28 13	Atlanta United FC	3–1	New York City FC	Atlanta
5:00 PM EDT	Almirón 16', 23'; Villalba 19'; Parkhurst (yellow card) 36'; Carmona (yellow card) 65'	Report	Ring (yellow card) 43'; Harrison 71'; Moralez (yellow card) 90+1'	Stadium: Bobby Dodd Stadium; Attendance: 44,901; Referee: Armando Villarreal

May 31 14	New York City FC	2–2	New England Revolution	New York, New York
7:30 PM EDT	Harrison 16'; Camargo 63'; Villa (yellow card) 81'; Lopez (yellow card) 90'	Report	Kamara 24'; Koffie (yellow card) 29'; Kouassi 86'; Rowe (yellow card) 87'	Stadium: Yankee Stadium; Attendance: 20,193; Referee: Chris Penso

June 3 15	New York City FC	2–1	Philadelphia Union	New York, New York
1:00 PM EDT	Camargo (yellow card) 30'; Moralez (yellow card) 78'; Chanot 80'; Callens 85'	Report	Sapong (yellow card) 64'; Picault 69'; Alberg (yellow card) 83'	Stadium: Yankee Stadium; Attendance: 24,290; Referee: Hilario Grajeda

June 17 16	New York City FC	2–1	Seattle Sounders FC	New York, New York
1:00 PM EDT	Wallace (yellow card) 44'; Villa 52' (pen.), 77'; White (yellow card) 80'; Okoli (yellow card) 90+4'	Report	Svensson (yellow card) 28'; Roldan (yellow card) 29', (goal) 40'; Alonso (yellow card) 48'; Marshall (yellow card) 52'	Stadium: Yankee Stadium; Attendance: 25,073; Referee: Robert Sibiga

June 24 17	New York Red Bulls	0–2	New York City FC	Harrison, New Jersey
1:30 PM EDT	Murillo (yellow card) 11'; Muyl (yellow card) 77'; Lawrence (yellow card) 90+5'	Report	Chanot (yellow card) 20'; McNamara (yellow card) 28'; Harrison 33'; Sweat 65'; Ring (yellow card) 84'	Stadium: Red Bull Arena; Attendance: 25,219; Referee: Alan Kelly

June 29 18	New York City FC	3–1	Minnesota United FC	New York, New York
7:30 PM EDT	Callens 38'; Villa (yellow card) 45+4', (goal) 63'; Harrison 52'; Wallace (yellow card) 68'	Report	Ramirez 9'; Molino (yellow card) 23'; Venegas (yellow card) 45+4'	Stadium: Yankee Stadium; Attendance: 21,572; Referee: Armando Villarreal

July 5 19	Vancouver Whitecaps FC	3–2	New York City FC	Vancouver
10:00 PM EDT	Montero 2'; Harvey 53'; Reyna 87'	Report	Chanot 33'; Villa 41'	Stadium: BC Place; Attendance: 22,120; Referee: Baldermo Toledo

July 19 20	New York City FC	2–2	Toronto FC	New York, New York
7:30 PM EDT	McNamara (yellow card) 23'; Villa 45'; Moralez 56'; Herrera (yellow card) 66'; Allen (yellow card) 90+1'	Report	Morgan 11'; Moor (yellow card) 26'; Bono (yellow card) 34'; Morgan (yellow card) 70'; Vázquez 90'	Stadium: Yankee Stadium; Attendance: 22,011; Referee: Jorge González

July 22 21	New York City FC	2–1	Chicago Fire	New York, New York
2:00 PM EDT	Herrera (yellow card) 8' (yellow-red card) 12'; Villa 47'; Brillant 50', (yellow card) 87'; Harrison (yellow card) 83'	Report	Meira (yellow card) 44'; Accam 54'; Kappelhof (yellow card) 61'	Stadium: Yankee Stadium; Attendance: 26,025; Referee: Allen Chapman

July 30 22	Toronto FC	4–0	New York City FC	Toronto
2:00 PM EDT	Giovinco 32', 67'; Altidore 75' (pen.); Edwards (yellow card) 80', (goal) 82'	Report	Callens (yellow card) 74'	Stadium: BMO Field; Attendance: 29,203; Referee: Chris Penso

August 6 23	New York City FC	3–2	New York Red Bulls	New York, New York
6:00 PM EDT	Moralez (yellow card) 7'; David Villa 28', 72', 75' (pen.), (yellow card) 82'	Report	Royer (yellow card) 6'; Wright-Phillips 41', 64'; Zizzo (yellow card) 75' (yellow-red card) 90'; Perrinelle (yellow card) 76'	Stadium: Yankee Stadium; Attendance: 33,679; Referee: Baldomero Toledo

August 12 24	LA Galaxy	0–2	New York City FC	Carson, California
10:30 PM EDT	Jones (yellow card) 34'	Report	Callens (yellow card) 36'; Ring (yellow card) 45'; Lewis 54'; Villa 73'; White (yellow card) 80'; Wallace (yellow card) 85'	Stadium: StubHub Center; Attendance: 25,667; Referee: Robert Sibiga

August 20 25	New York City FC	2–1	New England Revolution	New York, New York
6:00 PM EDT	Brillant (yellow card) 59'; Allen (yellow card) 75'; Villa 77'; Herrera (yellow card) 89'; Lewis 90+4'	Report	Angoua (yellow card) 53'; Bunbury 57'	Stadium: Yankee Stadium; Attendance: 22,415; Referee: Mark Geiger

August 25 26	New York Red Bulls	1–1	New York City FC	Harrison, New Jersey
7:00 PM EDT	Lawrence (yellow card) 35'; Verón 70' (pen.)	Report	Ring (yellow card) 19'; Wallace (yellow card) 43'; Moralez 56'	Stadium: Red Bull Arena; Attendance: 25,219; Referee: Jair Marrufo

September 6 27	New York City FC	1–0	Sporting Kansas City	New York, New York
7:30 PM EDT	Moralez (yellow card) 28'; Harrison 84'; Allen (yellow card) 89'	Report	Espinoza (yellow card) 24'; Rubio (yellow card) 90+2'	Stadium: Yankee Stadium; Attendance: 19,353; Referee: Ricardo Salazar

September 9 28	New York City FC	0–1	Portland Timbers	New York, New York
5:30 PM EDT	Sweat (yellow card) 71'; Moralez (yellow card) 88'	Report	Guzmán (yellow card) 22'; Blanco (yellow card) 27'; Valeri 44' (Mattocks), (yellow card) 90+5'; Chara (yellow card) 76'	Stadium: Yankee Stadium; Attendance: 23,651; Referee: Ishail Elfath

September 16 29	Colorado Rapids	1–1	New York City FC	Commerce City, Colorado
9:00 PM EDT	Gatt (yellow card) 58'; Badji 88'	Report	McNamara 19', (yellow card) 90+2'; Johnson (yellow card) 63'	Stadium: Dick's Sporting Goods Park; Attendance: 14,336; Referee: Chris Penso

September 23 30	New York City FC	1–1	Houston Dynamo	East Hartford, Connecticut
7:30 PM EDT	Moralez 6'	Report	Manotas 16'	Stadium: Pratt & Whitney Stadium at Rentschler Field; Attendance: 10,165; Referee: Allen Chapman

September 27 31	Montreal Impact	0–1	New York City FC	Montreal
7:30 PM EDT	Džemaili (yellow card) 40'	Report	Harrison 29'; Brillant (yellow card) 33'; Struna (yellow card) 45'; Ring (yellow card) 73'; Callens (yellow card) 74'	Stadium: Saputo Stadium; Attendance: 16,005; Referee: Hilario Grajeda

September 30 32	Chicago Fire	1–1	New York City FC	Bridgeview, Illinois
8:30 PM EDT	McCarty (yellow card) 16'; Nikolic 20'	Report	Villa 43'; Moralez (yellow card) 73'	Stadium: Toyota Park; Attendance: 20,195; Referee: José Carlos Rivero

October 15 33	New England Revolution	2–1	New York City FC	Foxborough, Massachusetts
3:00 PM EDT	Harrison (red card) 26'; Herrera (yellow card) 44'; Matarrita (yellow card) 76'; Shelton 90+3'	Report	Dielna (yellow card) 49'; Fagúndez 51', 90+2'; Farrell (yellow card) 78'; Agudelo (yellow card) 90+4'	Stadium: Gillette Stadium; Attendance: 33,767; Referee: Nima Saghafi

October 22 34	New York City FC	2–2	Columbus Crew	New York, New York
4:00 PM EDT	Villa 18', 45'; Herrera (yellow card) 69'	Report	Kamara 11'; Williams 58'	Stadium: Citi Field; Attendance: 20,113; Referee: Ismail Elfath
Note: Relocated from Yankee Stadium as a result of the New York Yankees qualifying for the American League Championship Series.

=== MLS Cup Playoffs ===
October 31 Eastern Conference Semifinals Leg 1	Columbus Crew SC	4–1	New York City FC	Columbus, Ohio
8:00 PM EDT	Kamara 6'; Artur 58'; Meram 69'; Afful 90+3'	Report	Callens (red card) 52'; Matarrita (yellow card) 64'; Villa 78'	Stadium: Mapfre Stadium; Attendance: 14,416; Referee: Alan Kelly

November 5 Eastern Conference Semifinals Leg 2	New York City FC	2–0 (3–4 agg.)	Columbus Crew SC	New York, New York
5:00 PM EST	Villa 16' (pen.); Struna 53'; Wallace (yellow card) 74'	Report	Abu (yellow card) 63'	Stadium: Yankee Stadium; Attendance: 23,246; Referee: Kevin Stott

== U.S. Open Cup ==
June 14 Fourth round	New York Red Bulls	1–0	New York City FC	Harrison, New Jersey
8:00 PM EDT	Long (yellow card) 56'; Royer 67'	Report	Callens (yellow card) 52'; Ring (yellow card) 60'	Stadium: Red Bull Arena; Attendance: 11,311; Referee: José Carlos Rivero

== Player statistics ==
No.	Pos	Nat	Player	Total		MLS		MLS Cup Playoffs		U.S. Open Cup	
No.	Pos	Nat	Player	Apps	Goals	Apps	Goals	Apps	Goals	Apps	Goals
1	GK	(United States) USA	Sean Johnson	35	0	32+0	0	2+0	0	1+0	0
2	DF	(United States) USA	Ben Sweat	29	1	25+1	1	2+0	0	1+0	0
3	DF	(United States) USA	Ethan White	23	0	19+2	0	1+0	0	1+0	0
4	DF	(Luxembourg) LUX	Maxime Chanot	19	2	19+0	2	0+0	0	0+0	0
5	MF	(United States) USA	Mikey Lopez	13	0	5+7	0	0+0	0	1+0	0
6	DF	(Peru) PER	Alexander Callens	36	2	34+0	2	1+0	0	1+0	0
7	FW	(Spain) ESP	David Villa	34	24	28+3	22	2+0	2	1+0	0
8	MF	(Finland) FIN	Alexander Ring	32	0	29+0	0	2+0	0	1+0	0
9	FW	(United States) USA	Sean Okoli	19	1	3+13	1	0+2	0	0+1	0
10	MF	(Argentina) ARG	Maxi Moralez	32	5	28+1	5	2+0	0	1+0	0
11	MF	(England) ENG	Jack Harrison	37	10	33+1	10	2+0	0	1+0	0
12	MF	(United States) USA	John Stertzer	6	0	0+5	0	0+0	0	0+1	0
13	DF	(France) FRA	Frédéric Brillant	26	1	16+7	1	2+0	0	1+0	0
14	MF	(Canada) CAN	Kwame Awuah	4	0	0+4	0	0+0	0	0+0	0
15	MF	(United States) USA	Tommy McNamara	28	3	19+8	3	0+0	0	1+0	0
16	DF	(United States) USA	James Sands	1	0	0+1	0	0+0	0	0+0	0
17	FW	(United States) USA	Jonathan Lewis	13	2	4+7	2	0+1	0	0+1	0
19	FW	(United States) USA	Khiry Shelton	15	1	3+12	1	0+0	0	0+0	0
21	MF	(Italy) ITA	Andrea Pirlo	16	0	14+1	0	0+1	0	0+0	0
22	DF	(Costa Rica) CRC	Rónald Matarrita	14	0	8+4	0	1+1	0	0+0	0
23	FW	(Costa Rica) CRC	Rodney Wallace	28	4	23+3	4	2+0	0	0+0	0
24	GK	(United States) USA	Andre Rawls	0	0	0+0	0	0+0	0	0+0	0
25	GK	(Norway) NOR	Eirik Johansen	2	0	2+0	0	0+0	0	0+0	0
26	DF	(United States) USA	R. J. Allen	15	0	10+5	0	0+0	0	0+0	0
30	MF	(Venezuela) VEN	Yangel Herrera	20	1	14+4	1	2+0	0	0+0	0
32	DF	(Slovenia) SVN	Andraž Struna	7	1	4+1	0	1+1	1	0+0	0
52	DF	(Trinidad and Tobago) TRI	Shannon Gomez	0	0	0+0	0	0+0	0	0+0	0
99	MF	(Panama) PAN	Miguel Camargo	8	1	2+6	1	0+0	0	0+0	0

NYCFC Etihad Airways Player of the Month : David Villa November 2017
