= Ralls =

Ralls may refer to:

== Surname ==
- Ralls (surname)

== Places in the United States ==
- Ralls, Texas, a city
- Ralls County, Missouri

== Other uses ==
- Ralls High School, Ralls, Texas

== See also ==
- Rawls, a surname
- Rawls College of Business, Texas Tech University
- The Rawls Course, a golf course, home of the Texas Tech Red Raiders golf teams
- Rall
- Rallis
- Rallus
