= Jack Harrison (footballer, born 1996) =

English footballer (born 1996)

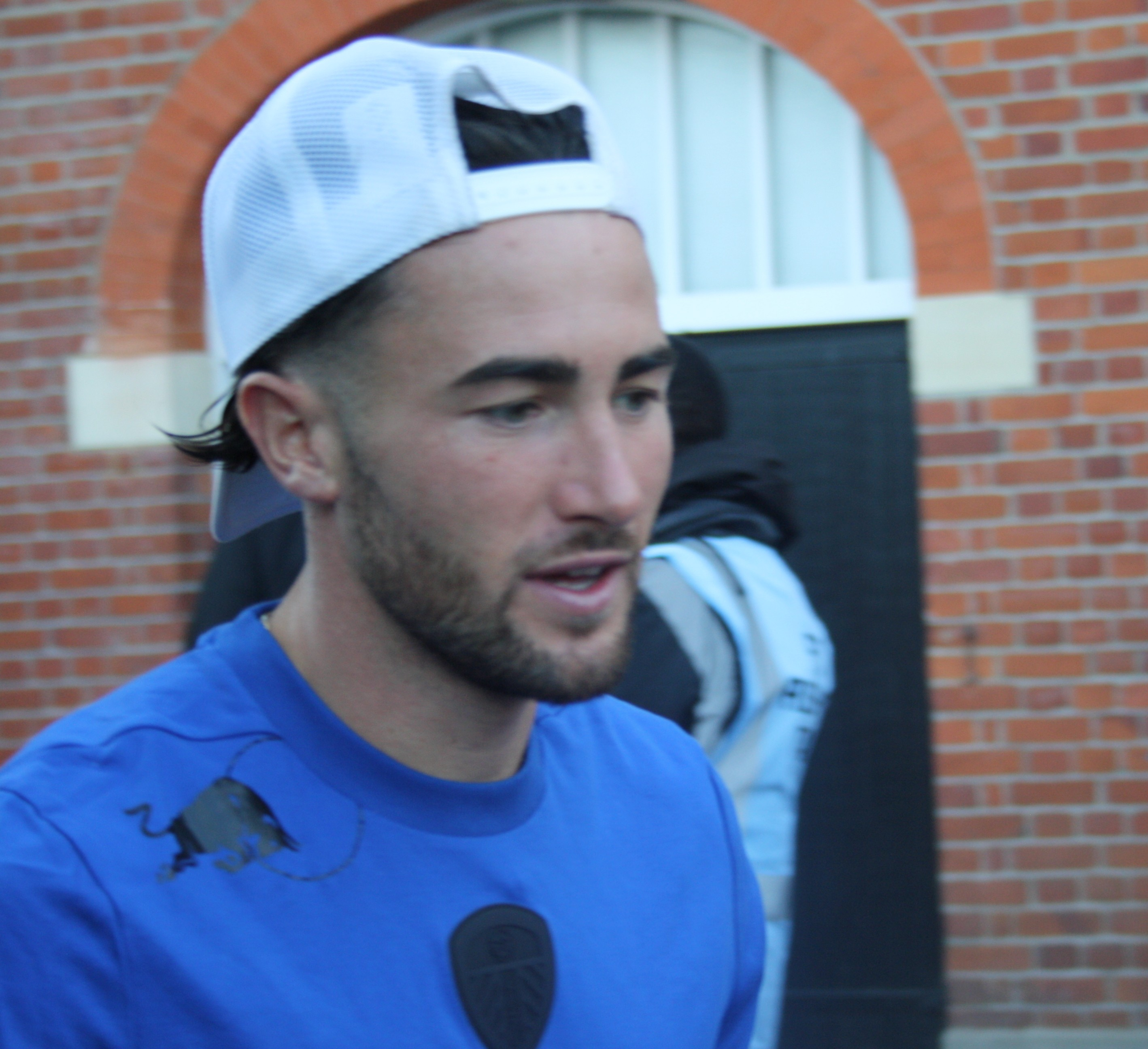
- Harrison with Leeds United in 2025

Personal information
- Full name: Jack David Harrison
- Date of birth: 20 November 1996 (age 30)
- Place of birth: Stoke-on-Trent, England
- Height: 5 ft 9 in (1.75 m)
- Position: Winger

Team information
- Current team: New England Revolution
- Number: 11

Youth career
- 2002–2003: Liverpool
- 2003–2010: Manchester United
- 2010–2013: Black Rock FC
- 2013–2015: Manhattan SC

College career
Years	Team	Apps	(Gls)
2015	Wake Forest Demon Deacons	22	(8)

Senior career*
Years	Team	Apps	(Gls)
2016–2017	New York City FC	55	(14)
2018–2021	Manchester City	0	(0)
2018	→ Middlesbrough (loan)	4	(0)
2018–2019	→ Leeds United (loan)	37	(4)
2019–2020	→ Leeds United (loan)	46	(6)
2020–2021	→ Leeds United (loan)	36	(8)
2021–2026	Leeds United	82	(13)
2023–2024	→ Everton (loan)	29	(3)
2024–2025	→ Everton (loan)	34	(1)
2026	→ Fiorentina (loan)	15	(1)
2026–	New England Revolution	7	(0)

International career
2017	England U21	2	(0)
- * Club domestic league appearances and goals as of 03:58, 10 September 2026 (UTC)

Jack David Harrison (born 20 November 1996) is an English professional footballer who plays as a winger for Major League Soccer club New England Revolution.

Harrison moved to the United States as a teenager, having played in the academies of both Liverpool and Manchester United. He played college soccer for the Wake Forest Demon Deacons, and his performances saw him selected as the #1 overall pick by Chicago Fire in the 2016 MLS SuperDraft. He was then traded to New York City FC, where he was rated as the second best player in Major League Soccer (MLS) under the age of 24 the same year. In 2018, he signed for Premier League club Manchester City. He was briefly loaned to Middlesbrough, before spending three seasons on loan with Leeds United, finally joining the club on a permanent deal in 2021. Following Leeds' relegation in 2023, he had two seasons on loan at Everton.

Whilst playing in MLS, Harrison was called up to the England U21 and was capped twice.

== Early life ==
Harrison was born in Stoke-on-Trent and raised in Bolton, Greater Manchester where he attended Harwood Meadows Primary School and then Turton School. He spent a short time at the Liverpool academy as a seven-year-old, but eventually opted to attend Manchester United's academy, where he spent seven years.

At age 14, Harrison made the decision to leave the Manchester United academy to attend Berkshire School in Sheffield, Massachusetts, also representing their affiliated club team, Black Rock FC. In 2015, he was the Gatorade National Player of the Year for high school soccer. Harrison is one of four overseas players to move to the U.S. for high school and win Gatorade National Player of the Year on the men's side, all since 2012.

Harrison signed a National Letter of Intent to play college soccer for Wake Forest University in Winston-Salem, North Carolina. During the 2015 NCAA Division I men's soccer season, he made 22 appearances with Wake Forest, scoring eight goals, and providing 11 assists.

== Club career ==
=== New York City ===
He signed for New York City in a deal that involved youth agent Jono Simpson. In December 2015, reports emerged that New York City were attempting to claim Harrison as a homegrown player because he had played with club youth affiliate Manhattan Soccer Club for the previous three years, allowing them to sign him before the draft. However this claim was rejected by MLS, and Harrison entered the 2016 MLS SuperDraft as the youngest available player. On 14 January 2016, he was selected as the #1 overall pick in the 2016 MLS SuperDraft by Chicago Fire and traded to New York City for the fourth overall pick, Brandon Vincent, plus payment. Shortly after the draft it was discovered that Harrison had a fractured pelvic bone which left him on the sidelines for the first three months of his New York City career.

==== 2016 season ====
Harrison made his professional debut on 21 May 2016 as a 57th-minute substitute for Tommy McNamara in a 7–0 loss against New York Red Bulls at Yankee Stadium. Harrison's individual performance was described as a "silver lining" for his side. Harrison became the first teenage scorer for the club when he scored his first professional goal on his first professional start against Real Salt Lake at Yankee Stadium on 2 June. On 3 July, Harrison scored the opener in the Hudson River Derby in a man of the match performance as New York City recorded their first win over the Red Bulls. At the end of the season, Harrison was nominated for, but ultimately did not win, the MLS Rookie of the Year Award, which went to Jordan Morris of the Seattle Sounders. Harrison was also the runner up for the 2016 MLS Goal of the Year Award, which went to Shkëlzen Gashi of the Colorado Rapids.

==== 2017 season ====
In March 2017, Harrison and NYCFC teammates Eirik Johansen and Rónald Matarrita earned U.S. green cards. Harrison scored his first goal of the new season on 1 April, in a 2–1 win over San Jose Earthquakes. On 29 April, he recorded his first professional multi-goal performance, scoring a brace to secure a 3–2 victory over Columbus Crew. Harrison also scored the game-winning opener in a 2–0 victory against New York Red Bulls to give the club its first ever win at Red Bull Arena on 24 June. Ahead of his move to Manchester City, Harrison was praised by former teammate Andrea Pirlo, who said of Harrison, "He is very young, he's fast and he is capable of playing in Europe. He's a good player." Another former teammate Frank Lampard said, "I think there a lot of big things to come from Jack. I like him, he's a great lad, great ability."

=== Manchester City ===
On 30 January 2018, Harrison signed for Premier League club Manchester City, a partner club with his previous side New York City as part of the City Football Group, signing a contract running until the conclusion of the 2020–21 season. He ultimately did not make an appearance for City, as he was sent on loan to Middlesbrough and spent three consecutive seasons on loan at Leeds United, in between extending his contract for another year.

==== Loan to Middlesbrough ====
Immediately after signing a contract with City, Harrison was loaned out to Championship club Middlesbrough, under the management of recently appointed manager Tony Pulis. He made his first appearance for Middlesbrough on 17 February 2018, in the 83rd minute of a 1–0 loss to Cardiff City. He made four appearances for Middlesbrough in total, being unable to displace the regular wingers Adama Traoré and Stewart Downing.

=== Leeds United ===
==== 2018–2021: On loan ====
After taking part in Manchester City's pre-season tour of the United States, on 30 July 2018, Harrison signed for Championship club Leeds United on a season-long loan. He made his debut for Leeds in the opening game of the season on 5 August, as a substitute against his hometown club Stoke City at Elland Road in a 3–1 win. Nine days later, he made his first start in an EFL Cup match against Bolton Wanderers. Harrison made his first start in the League for Leeds on 31 August, coming into the starting lineup for the injured Pablo Hernández in a 0–0 draw against Middlesbrough. On 15 September, he scored his first goal for the club, an 89th-minute equaliser in the 1–1 draw against Millwall.

He scored his second goal of the season on 11 January 2019 against his former New York teammate Frank Lampard's side Derby County in a 2–0 victory. In his 100th professional fixture, Harrison scored the winner in a 1–0 win over Sheffield Wednesday at Elland Road, the second game of the season in which he claimed the match-winner.

During the 2018–19 season, Harrison played 42 games in all competitions, scoring four goals. Leeds finished the regular season in third place having dropping out of the automatic promotion places with three games left after a defeat to Wigan Athletic on 19 April, Leeds qualified for the playoffs against sixth-placed Derby. Harrison started in both legs and gained an assist for Kemar Roofe's goal as Leeds won the first leg of the playoffs in a 1–0 win at Pride Park, to bring a 1–0 aggregate lead into the home leg at Elland Road. Leeds lost 4–2 in the second leg, which saw Derby progress 4–3 on aggregate to the final against Aston Villa.

After Harrison's initial loan spell at Leeds, he returned to City. Leeds were keen to sign Harrison permanently; however, it was reported that his parent club had put a £20 million valuation on him. On 27 June 2019, it was announced that Harrison was in talks with Leeds to re-sign on another season long loan deal. On 1 July 2019, Harrison re-signed for Leeds on a season-long loan. As part of the deal, Leeds also had the option to sign Harrison on a permanent transfer at the end of the 2019–20 season. He scored on his second debut on 4 August in Leeds' opening day 3–1 victory against Bristol City.

For Harrison's two game-winning goals in November 2019 against Blackburn Rovers and Reading, as well as an additional goal and an assist the same month, he was nominated for the EFL Championship Player of the Month for November, losing out to eventual award-winner, Hull City's Jarrod Bowen. His fifth goal of the 2019–20 season came on 29 December, in a 5–4 win at Birmingham City. Harrison ultimately helped Leeds gain promotion to the Premier League as EFL Championship champions.

On 10 August 2020, it was announced that Harrison would join Leeds for a third successive season on loan, this time with a view to a permanent move, in preparation for the club's return to the Premier League. He scored his first Premier League goal for Leeds, and the club's first goal in the top flight of English football for 16 years, in their first league match of the 2020–21 season against Liverpool. On 28 November, Harrison made his 100th appearance for Leeds in a 1–0 victory against Everton at Goodison Park in Leeds' first win at the opponent club's venue since 1990. On 16 December, scored his second goal of the season in Leeds' 5–2 home win over Newcastle United, a 30-yard top-corner "screamer" that he unleashed from just outside the Newcastle penalty area, having received the ball in his own half. On 29 December, Harrison scored in Leeds' 5–0 win over West Bromwich Albion at The Hawthorns. On 15 May 2021, Harrison put in a man of the match performance in a 4–0 away win over Burnley.

==== 2021–2023: Permanent transfer ====
On 2 July 2021, Leeds officially announced the permanent signing of Harrison on a three-year contract for a transfer fee of £11 million. He scored his first two goals of the 2021–22 season in a 3–0 victory over Crewe Alexandra in the second round of the EFL Cup on 24 August. On 16 January 2022, Harrison scored his first senior hat-trick, helping Leeds to a 3–2 victory over West Ham United in the league. On 22 May, Harrison scored a stoppage time winner in a 2–1 win against Brentford at the Brentford Community Stadium, with Leeds staying up in the Premier League as a result of the victory.

On 6 April 2023, Harrison signed a new five-year deal with Leeds, committing him to the club until 2028. On the last day of the 2022–23 season, Harrison scored, but Leeds ultimately lost 4–1, a result which saw them relegated from the Premier League.

==== 2023–2025: Loans to Everton ====
On 14 August 2023, Harrison returned to the Premier League, signing on a season-long loan to Everton, beating Aston Villa to his signature. Harrison's loan deal did not include an agreement to buy, but did have a release clause which Everton could have activated during his loan spell. Harrison made his Everton debut in a 2–1 EFL Cup win at Aston Villa on 27 September 2023. On 7 October, he scored his first goal for Everton in a 3–0 win against Bournemouth at Goodison Park.

On 24 June 2024, Everton announced that Harrison would extend his loan deal with the club once again for the 2024–25 season.

==== 2025: Return to Leeds ====
Following Leeds' promotion back to the pinnacle of English football, Harrison returned to Thorp Arch for the first time since his loan spell at Everton. Harrison participated in Leeds' pre-season training and block of friendly matches. In his unofficial return against Manchester United in Stockholm, Harrison was the recipient of jeers by angered supporters, given his past decision to leave the club when they were relegated. After a successful pre-season, manager Daniel Farke elected to keep Harrison in the squad. On 18 August 2025, he was given the squad number 20 and made a substitute appearance in the 78th minute in Leeds' first match back in the Premier League, a 1–0 win against his former club, Everton.

On 19 January 2026, Harrison joined Serie A side Fiorentina on loan until the end of the season.

=== 2026: MLS return ===
On 25 July 2026, New England Revolution of Major League Soccer signed Harrison to a Designated Player contract from Leeds United that runs through the 2029-30 season. Harrison made his Revolution debut on 8 August, entering as a 54th minute substitute in a 2-0 home loss to the Houston Dynamo. He made his first start the following week, providing an assist in a 2-1 loss to Toronto FC on 15 August. On 19 August he recorded a career-high three assists (all to Alhassan Yusuf) in the Revolution's 3-0 win over D.C. United.

== International career ==
On 1 October 2017, Harrison was called into the England U21 squad for the first time after injuries to Ruben Loftus-Cheek and Sheyi Ojo for games against Scotland and Andorra. He made his debut in the fixture against Scotland, replacing Tammy Abraham in the 88th minute. He subsequently made one other appearance for the team.

== Style of play ==
Harrison is a versatile left footed attacker, who plays as a winger, mainly on the left flank, he is also comfortable playing on the right side. He can also play as an attacking midfield playmaker. He is known for his pace, his dribbling ability and workrate. Former New York City teammate David Villa said about Harrison: "I've spent a lot of years in this game, and he has something important that only a few players have, when he has the ball at his feet, you get the sensation something special is going to happen."

His former New York City manager Patrick Vieira said of Harrison, "He's a good player, technically he's really good, he understands the game, he can come and link with our No. 9, he can run behind the back four, his football brain is fantastic."

== Career statistics ==
As of match played 21 November 2026

Appearances and goals by club, season and competition
Club	Season	League			National cup (Note: Includes U.S. Open Cup, FA Cup, Coppa Italia)		League cup (Note: Includes EFL Cup)		Other		Total	
Club	Season	Division	Apps	Goals	Apps	Goals	Apps	Goals	Apps	Goals	Apps	Goals
New York City FC	2016	MLS	21	4	0	0	–		2 (Note: Appearances in MLS Cup playoffs)	0	23	4
New York City FC	2017	MLS	34	10	1	0	–		2	0	37	10
New York City FC	Total		55	14	1	0	–		4	0	60	14
Manchester City	2017–18	Premier League	–		–		–		–		0	0
Manchester City	2018–19	Premier League	–		–		–		–		0	0
Manchester City	2019–20	Premier League	–		–		–		–		0	0
Manchester City	2020–21	Premier League	–		–		–		–		0	0
Manchester City	Total		–		–		–		–		0	0
Middlesbrough (loan)	2017–18	Championship	4	0	0	0	0	0	0	0	4	0
Leeds United (loan)	2018–19	Championship	37	4	1	0	2	0	2 (Note: Appearances in Championship play-offs)	0	42	4
Leeds United (loan)	2019–20	Championship	46	6	1	0	2	0	–		49	6
Leeds United (loan)	2020–21	Premier League	36	8	1	0	0	0	–		37	8
Leeds United	2021–22	Premier League	35	8	1	0	2	2	–		38	10
Leeds United	2022–23	Premier League	36	5	3	1	1	0	–		40	6
Leeds United	2023–24	Championship	0	0	–		–		–		0	0
Leeds United	2024–25	Championship	0	0	–		–		–		0	0
Leeds United	2025–26	Premier League	11	0	1	0	1	0	–		13	0
Leeds United	Leeds total		201	31	8	1	8	2	2	0	219	34
Everton (loan)	2023–24	Premier League	29	3	3	1	3	0	–		35	4
Everton (loan)	2024–25	Premier League	34	1	2	0	2	0	–		38	1
Everton (loan)	Total		63	4	5	1	5	0	–		73	5
Fiorentina (loan)	2025–26	Serie A	15	1	1	0	–		6 (Note: Appearances in UEFA Conference League)	0	22	1
New England Revolution	2026	MLS	7	0	–		–		1	0	8	0
Career total			341	50	15	2	14	2	12	0	382	54

== Honours ==
Leeds United

- EFL Championship: 2019–20

Individual

- Gatorade Player of the Year: 2015
- NYCFC Player of the Month: June 2016
