= Rawls =

Rawls is a surname which may refer to:

== People ==
- Alphonzo Rawls, American skateboarder
- Andre Rawls (born 1991), American sportsman
- Anne Warfield Rawls (born 1950), American sociologist
- Betsy Rawls (1928–2023), American golfer
- Eugenia Rawls (1913–2000), American actress
- Hardy Rawls (born 1952), actor
- J. Rawls (born 1974), American musician and record producer
- J. Lewis Rawls (1929–1994), American attorney and politician
- Jerry S. Rawls, American CEO and President of the Finistar Corporation
- John Rawls (disambiguation)
- Johnny Rawls (born 1951), American soul blues singer, guitarist, arranger, songwriter and record producer
- Katherine Rawls (1917–1982), American swimmer
- Lou Rawls (1933–2006), American record producer, singer, composer and actor
- Morgan Rawls, American politician
- Nancy V. Rawls (1926–1985), American diplomat
- Ron Rawls (born 1983), American musician
- Sarah Rawls, American chef
- Thomas Rawls (born 1993), American football player
- Wendell Rawls Jr. (born 1941), American investigative reporter and editor
- Will Rawls, American choreographer, performance artist, curator and writer
- Wilson Rawls (1913–1984), American author

== Fictional characters ==
- Reggie Rawls, on the TV series Oz
- William Rawls, on the TV series The Wire

== See also ==
- Ralls (surname)
- Rawles
