= Rawle =

Rawle is a surname. Notable people with the surname include:

- Cecil Rawle (1891–1938), Dominican barrister and activist
- Francis Rawle (1660–1727), colonist in Philadelphia
- George Rawle (1889–1978), Australian rules footballer
- Graham Rawle (1955–2024), British writer and collage artist
- Jeff Rawle (born 1951), British actor
- Keith Rawle (1924–2005), Australian rules footballer
- Mark Rawle (born 1979), English footballer
- Richard Rawle (1812–1889), British bishop of Trinidad
- Samuel Rawle (1771–1860), English topographical engraver
- Sid Rawle (1945–2010), English political activist
- Tim Rawle, English architectural photographer
- William Rawle (1759–1836), United States Attorney for Pennsylvania

== See also ==
- Rawls
- Rawles
- Rawle Alkins (born 1997), American basketball player in the Israeli Basketball Premier League
