= Ralls (surname) =

Ralls is a surname, and may refer to:

- Joe Ralls (born 1993), English professional footballer
- John Perkins Ralls (1822–1904), American physician and Confederate politician during the American Civil War
- Katherine Ralls (born 1939), American zoologist/conservationist
- Scott Ralls, president of Northern Virginia Community College

== See also ==
- Rall
- Rawls
- Rawls
- Rallis, Greek family
