= The Water Dancer =

2019 novel by Ta-Nehisi Coates

- First edition cover
- Author: Ta-Nehisi Coates
- Audio read by: Joe Morton
- Cover artist: Calida Garcia Rawles
- Language: English
- Genre: Historical fiction, science fiction
- Publisher: One World
- Publication date: September 24, 2019
- Publication place: United States
- Media type: Print (hardcover)
- Pages: 407
- ISBN: 978-0-399-59059-7
- Dewey Decimal: 813/.6
- LC Class: PS3603.O17 W38 2019

The Water Dancer is the debut novel by Ta-Nehisi Coates, published on September 24, 2019, by Random House under its One World imprint. It is a surrealist story set in the pre-Civil War South, concerning a superhuman protagonist named Hiram Walker who possesses a photographic memory, but who cannot remember his mother. He learns he has a special ability known as "conduction", with which he is able to transport people—including himself—over long distances. Conduction is powered by his memories and storytelling, and can fold the Earth like fabric, allowing travel across large areas via waterways.

The novel debuted at number one on The New York Times fiction best-seller list and was selected for the revival of Oprah's Book Club.

== Plot ==
Hiram Walker was born into slavery during the Antebellum South on a declining tobacco plantation in Virginia named Lockless. He is the mixed-race son of a white plantation owner and a black mother who was sold away by his father when Hiram was young. The local community consists of the enslaved ("the Tasked"); the landowners ("the Quality"); and the low-class whites ("the Low"). Hiram has an extraordinary photographic memory but is unable to remember his mother. However, in one instance when Hiram is driving across a bridge he suddenly has a vision of his mother dancing. When the vision ends, his carriage has fallen into the water. His white half brother drowns, but Hiram is transported out of the water. He learns that his miracle survival was a result of a superhuman ability he calls "conduction", with which he can transport himself and others across impossible distances. Conduction is triggered by powerful memories: those of his mother. He becomes involved with the Underground Railroad. Hiram escapes to Philadelphia, where he encounters Box Brown and Jarm Logue. He eventually comes to meet a famous member of the Underground named Moses, who also has the power of Conduction. Moses is later revealed to be Harriet Tubman.

== Background ==
Coates began writing the novel around 2008 and 2009. He had recently finished his first memoir, The Beautiful Struggle, and was encouraged by his agent to write fiction. At the time, Coates was extensively researching slavery and the Civil War. At the end of The Water Dancer, Coates adds an author's note, listing Peter and William Still as the inspiration for the characters in the White family. Coates was influenced by author E. L. Doctorow and "how he almost reinvented history; he made history his in a certain kind of way". Coates cited Doctorow's novels Ragtime (1975) and Billy Bathgate (1989) as early influences and recalled later reading The Waterworks. He was also influenced by his childhood love of comic books and, in general, the concept of heroes. While researching the Civil War, he was frustrated with how "a lot of the people who were held up as heroic were in fact straight-up white supremacists." Coates worked on the novel for a decade in "various degrees".

== Reception ==
The novel debuted at number one on The New York Times fiction best-seller list for the week ending September 28, 2019. The novel was selected by Oprah Winfrey as the first book for the revival of her Oprah's Book Club on Apple TV+. She called it "one of the best books I have ever read in my entire life. Right up there in the Top 5."

Publishers Weekly gave the novel a rave review, writing, "In prose that sings and imagination that soars, Coates further cements himself as one of this generation's most important writers, tackling one of America's oldest and darkest periods with grace and inventiveness. This is bold, dazzling, and not to be missed." David Fear of Rolling Stone gave the novel a rave review, saying it exceeded expectations for a debut novel and writing, "What's most powerful is the way Coates enlists his notions of the fantastic, as well as his fluid prose, to probe a wound that never seems to heal. [...] There's an urgency to his remembrance of things past that brims with authenticity, testifying to centuries of bone-deep pain. It makes The Water Dancer feel timeless and instantly canon-worthy." Dwight Garner of The New York Times gave the novel a positive review, calling it "a jeroboam of a book, a crowd-pleasing exercise in breakneck and often occult storytelling that tonally resembles the work of Stephen King as much as it does the work of Toni Morrison, Colson Whitehead and the touchstone African-American science-fiction writer Octavia Butler." Kirkus Reviews gave the novel a favorable review, but felt it was "less intensely realized" than Colson Whitehead's The Underground Railroad (2015).

Constance Grady of Vox praised the "clarity of Coates's ideas and the poetry of his language" but largely panned the novel as a "mess" with monotonous characters and lacking a strong plot development to make up for it. She criticized the movement between the plot-driven and allegorical storytelling modes as "whiplash-inducing". Shah Tazrian Ashrafi of The Daily Star, while complimenting its "lyrical prose", felt that the novel "left [him] craving more action and high-geared moments of grief, suspense, climax, and character development."

== Awards ==
Year	Award	Category	Result	Ref.
2019	Center for Fiction First Novel Prize	—	Longlisted	
2019	Goodreads Choice Awards	Historical Fiction	Nominated	
2020	Andrew Carnegie Medals for Excellence	Fiction	Finalist	
2020	Audie Awards	Literary Fiction & Classics	Won	
2020	BCALA Literary Awards	First Novel	Won	
2020	British Fantasy Award	Sydney J. Bounds Award	Won	
2020	Locus Award	First Novel	Nominated	
2020	NAACP Image Awards	Fiction	Finalist	

== Baker v. Coates ==
In 2022, Ralph W. Baker Jr. sued Coates and multiple other parties including Bertelsmann (the parent company of Penguin Random House). The case involved a copyright dispute in which Baker accused The Water Dancer of plagiarizing Baker's book Shock Exchange: How Inner-City Kids From Brooklyn Predicted the Great Recession and the Pain Ahead. After US Supreme Court Justices Samuel Alito, Sonia Sotomayor, Neil Gorsuch, Amy Coney Barrett and Ketanji Brown Jackson recused themselves, the court lacked a quorum and summarily affirmed a decision by the Court of Appeals for the Second Circuit which dismissed Baker's complaint.
