= R. J. Allen =

American soccer player (born 1990)

Personal information
- Full name: Robert James Allen
- Date of birth: April 17, 1990 (age 36)
- Place of birth: Old Bridge, New Jersey, U.S.
- Height: 1.80 m (5 ft 11 in)
- Position: Defender

Youth career
- 2008–2011: Monmouth Hawks

Senior career*
| Years | Team | Apps | (Gls) |
| 2010–2011 | Central Jersey Spartans | 13 | (3) |
| 2013 | Skive IK | 13 | (0) |
| 2015–2017 | New York City FC | 53 | (1) |
| 2018 | Orlando City SC | 18 | (0) |
| 2019 | FC Motown | 5 | (0) |
| 2019 | Philadelphia Union | 0 | (0) |
| Total | | 102 | (4) |
- * Club domestic league appearances and goals

Robert James "R. J." Allen (born April 17, 1990) is an American former professional soccer player. Predominantly a right-sided defender, Allen is the older brother of soccer player, Brandon Allen.

Allen started his soccer career at St. Joseph High School in Metuchen, New Jersey, followed by college soccer at Monmouth University. He briefly played for USL PDL side Central Jersey Spartans while in college. After being drafted by Chivas USA in 2012, he later joined Skive IK in Denmark. Upon returning to the U.S., he had trials with various clubs and worked as a youth soccer coach.

In 2015, he joined New York City FC, making notable contributions and earning recognition. Subsequently, he was traded to Orlando City SC in 2017. In 2019, he played for FC Motown in the National Premier Soccer League. Allen later signed with the Philadelphia Union but retired due to injury at the end of the 2019 season.

== Career ==
=== High school ===
Allen attended St. Joseph High School in Metuchen, New Jersey, between 2004 and 2008, where he played soccer all four years.

=== College and amateur ===
Allen played four years of college soccer at Monmouth University between 2008 and 2011.

While at college, Allen appeared for USL PDL side Central Jersey Spartans in 2010 and 2011.

=== Professional ===
On January 17, 2012, Allen was selected 5th overall in the 2012 MLS Supplemental Draft by Chivas USA. He didn't sign with Chivas USA, instead signed with Danish side Skive IK later, in February 2013.

Allen returned to the United States and had trials with D.C United, Orlando City SC, New York Red Bulls, and the New York Cosmos ahead of the 2015 MLS season. During this time, Allen was contacted by New York City FC to train with David Villa before the beginning of the season, which he did with future Red Bull Mike Grella. He was not offered a professional contract prior to the 2015 season, taking a job as a youth soccer coach on Staten Island instead.

==== New York City FC ====
After a slow start to their inaugural season, New York City FC offered Allen a contract on May 2, 2015. Allen made his NYCFC debut the following day as a substitute in a 3–1 loss to Seattle Sounders FC. He got his first start the following week in the first Hudson River Derby against the New York Red Bulls, during which he assisted Patrick Mullins on the team's only goal in a 2–1 loss. He also made 13 starts in 14 appearances during the 2015 season, drifting in and out of favor under manager Jason Kries, who was fired on November 2, 2015, after a disappointing season.

Under new manager Patrick Vieira, Allen solidified himself as the first choice right or left back.

On April 27, 2016, Allen scored his first MLS goal in a 1–1 tie against the Montreal Impact. During a match on May 15, 2016, against the Portland Timbers, Allen set up the first goal by playing a 50-yard through ball to striker David Villa. This pass by Allen has been called one of the 'greatest assists in NYCFC history' by some reporters. Allen recorded his second assist of the season on May 29 against Orlando City SC, in a performance that would earn him MLS team of the week honors.

RJ finished the season with 6 assists. This was the joint highest total in the league for a defender.

==== Orlando City ====
In December 2017, Allen was traded by NYCFC to Orlando City SC in exchange for a third-round pick in the 2018 MLS SuperDraft, reuniting him with manager Jason Kreis. After one season in Orlando which also saw the departure of Kreis, Allen was waived by the team on February 6, 2019.

==== FC Motown ====
In April 2019, Allen joined National Premier Soccer League side FC Motown ahead of the 2019 season. He made six appearances for the team, including starting in a First Round loss to New York Red Bulls U-23 in the 2019 U.S. Open Cup. He left the team at the end of the regular season.

==== Philadelphia Union ====
In July 2019, Allen rejoined the American top flight and signed with Philadelphia Union competing in MLS. Allen was released by Philadelphia at the end of the season due to injury was unable to regain his form and soon retired from MLS.

== Career statistics ==
Appearances and goals by club, season and competition
| Club | Season | League | | | Cup | | Playoffs | | Continental | | Total | |
| Club | Season | Division | Apps | Goals | Apps | Goals | Apps | Goals | Apps | Goals | Apps | Goals |
|---|---|---|---|---|---|---|---|---|---|---|---|---|
| Skive | 2012–13 | 1st Division | 13 | 0 | 0 | 0 | — | | — | | 13 | 0 |
| NYCFC | 2015 | MLS | 14 | 0 | 1 | 0 | — | | — | | 15 | 0 |
| NYCFC | 2016 | MLS | 24 | 1 | 0 | 0 | 2 | 0 | — | | 26 | 1 |
| NYCFC | 2017 | MLS | 15 | 0 | 0 | 0 | 0 | 0 | — | | 15 | 0 |
| NYCFC | Total | | 53 | 1 | 1 | 0 | 2 | 0 | 0 | 0 | 56 | 1 |
| Orlando City SC | 2018 | MLS | 18 | 0 | 2 | 0 | 0 | 0 | — | | 20 | 0 |
| FC Motown | 2019 | NPSL | 5 | 0 | 1 | 0 | 0 | 0 | — | | 6 | 0 |
| Philadelphia Union | 2019 | MLS | 0 | 0 | 0 | 0 | 0 | 0 | — | | 0 | 0 |
| Total | | | 89 | 1 | 4 | 0 | 2 | 0 | 0 | 0 | 95 | 1 |

== Honors ==
New York City:

MLS Team of the Week:

- 2015: Week 30
- 2016: Week 13

FIFA Team of the Week:

- FIFA 2016: Week 42

NYCFC Player of the Month:

- 2016: May

== Endorsements ==
In 2017, Allen became an ambassador for Concave football boot, and always played with the Concave Aura+ cleats.
