= RAL =

RAL or variation, may refer to:

== People ==
- Ral Donner (1943–1984), U.S. rock singer
- Ral Rosario (born 1952), Filipino swimmer
- Manjeet Singh Ral (born 1985), British Indian musician

=== Fictional characters ===
- Ral, a character from Ral Grad
- Ral Dorn, a Marvel Comics character from Dragon Lord
- Devinoni Ral, a character from Star Trek
- Petra Ral, a character from Attack on Titan
- Ramba Ral, a character from Gundam

== Places ==
- Mont-ral, Alt Camp, Tarragona, Catalonia, Spain
- Riverside Municipal Airport (IATA airport code RAL), California, USA
- Rayners Lane tube station (station code RAL), London, England, UK; a London Underground station
- Radio Astronomy Laboratory, University of California, Berkeley, USA
- Riverbank Laboratories (RAL: Riverbank Acoustical Laboratories), Geneva, Illinois, USA
- Rutherford Appleton Laboratory, Chilton, Oxfordshire, England, UK; a national research lab

== Medicine, biology ==
- Raltegravir, an antiretroviral medication
- Zearalenone, an estrogenic metabolite
- Ral protein
  - Ral-A protein and gene
  - Ral-B protein and gene
- retinaldehyde (RAL), a polyene chromaphore

== Other uses ==
- RAL colour standard for colour matching
- Ralte language (ISO 639 code ral)
- RaL, the Rayleigh number w.r.t. length; see heat transfer coefficient
- respectful adoption language, part of the language of adoption
- Refund anticipation loan, in the US
- No. 605 Squadron RAF (squadron code RAL)
- Royal Arctic Line, a Greenland freight company
- Regional AGMARK Laboratory (RAL), a certification lab for Agmark
- Retribuzione Annuale Lorda, a term similar to gross annual salary used to describe employee remuneration in Italy (it:Retribuzione)

== See also ==
- R.A.L. Fell (1895–1973), British scholar
- Ral Ral, an Aboriginal chief from South Australia, namesake of Calperum Station (reserve)
- Ral Ral, former name of the Calperum Station (reserve)
- Ral Ral Creek, a tributary of the Murray River; see List of Murray River distances
- Rall (surname)
