= John Rawls (disambiguation) =

John Rawls (1921–2002) was an American moral and political philosopher.

John Rawls may also refer to:

- John Rawls (actor) (born 1972), New Zealand actor
- John F. Rawls, American developmental biologist since the 1990s
- John S. Rawls (1921–1993), American politician in Florida

== See also ==
- Johnny Rawls (born 1951), American soul blues singer and songwriter
- John Perkins Ralls (1822–1904), American physician and Confederate politician during the American Civil War
- Rawls, a surname
