= 2018 MLS Re-Entry Draft =

College draft for soccer teams

General information
- Date(s): Stage 1: December 14, 2018; Stage 2: December 20, 2018

Overview
- League: Major League Soccer
- Teams: 24

The 2018 MLS Re-Entry Draft took place on December 14, 2018 (Stage 1) and December 20, 2018 (Stage 2). All 24 Major League Soccer clubs were eligible to participate. The priority order for the MLS Re-Entry Draft was reverse order of finish in 2018, taking into account playoff performance. The 2019 expansion team, FC Cincinnati, had selection #24.

Available to all teams in Stage 1 of the Re-Entry draft were:

- Players who were at least 23 years old and had a minimum of three years of MLS experience whose contract options were not exercised by their clubs. They were available at their option salary for 2019.
- Players who were at least 25 years old with a minimum of four years of MLS experience who were out of contract and whose club did not wish to re-sign them at their previous salary. They were available for at least their 2018 salary.
- Free Agents that chose to participate.

Players who were not selected in Stage 1 of the Re-Entry Draft were made available in Stage 2. Clubs selecting players in Stage 2 were able to negotiate a new salary with the player. If a selected player was not under contract, the selecting club was required to make a genuine offer to the player within seven days subject to League Office approval.

Players who remained unselected after Stage 2 were made available to any MLS club on a first-come, first-served basis.

Teams also had the option of passing on their selection.

== Available players ==
Players were required to meet age and service requirements to participate as stipulated by the terms of the MLS Collective Bargaining Agreement. The league released a list of all players available for the Re-Entry Draft on December 13, 2018.

Player	Released By	Re-Entry Draft Result
José Aja	Vancouver Whitecaps FC	Not Selected
Vytas	D.C. United	Not Selected
Giles Barnes	Colorado Rapids	Not Selected
Louis Béland-Goyette	Montreal Impact	Not Selected
Joe Bendik	Orlando City SC	Not Selected
Calle Brown	Seattle Sounders FC	Not Selected
Jonathan Campbell	Chicago Fire	Not Selected
Ashley Cole	LA Galaxy	Not Selected
Drew Conner	Chicago Fire	Not Selected
Michael de Leeuw	Chicago Fire	Not Selected
Nick DeLeon	D.C. United	Selected by Toronto FC in Stage One
Christian Dean	Chicago Fire	Not Selected
Kevin Ellis	D.C. United	Not Selected
Maynor Figueroa	FC Dallas	Not Selected
Kyle Fisher	Montreal Impact	Not Selected
Luis Gil	Houston Dynamo	Not Selected
Mike Grella	Columbus Crew SC	Not Selected
Femi Hollinger-Janzen	New England Revolution	Not Selected
Clint Irwin	Toronto FC	Not Selected
Dejan Jakovic	Los Angeles FC	Not Selected
Jared Jeffrey	D.C. United	Not Selected
Taylor Kemp	D.C. United	Not Selected
Matt Lampson	Minnesota United FC	Selected by LA Galaxy in Stage Two
Richie Laryea	Orlando City SC	Not Selected
Wandrille Lefèvre	Unattached	Not Selected
Charlie Lyon	Los Angeles FC	Not Selected
Calum Mallace	Los Angeles FC	Not Selected
Richie Marquez	Philadelphia Union	Not Selected
Enzo Martínez	Colorado Rapids	Not Selected
Aaron Maund	Vancouver Whitecaps FC	Not Selected
Jack McBean	Colorado Rapids	Not Selected
John McCarthy	Philadelphia Union	Not Selected
Patrick McLain	Chicago Fire	Not Selected
Tommy McNamara	New York City FC	Selected by Houston Dynamo in Stage Two
Luke Mulholland	Real Salt Lake	Not Selected
Lawrence Olum	Portland Timbers	Not Selected
Kofi Opare	D.C. United	Not Selected
Taylor Peay	Real Salt Lake	Not Selected
Demar Phillips	Real Salt Lake	Not Selected
Andre Rawls	New York City FC	Selected by Colorado Rapids in Stage One
Dylan Remick	Houston Dynamo	Not Selected
Tosaint Ricketts	Toronto FC	Not Selected
Carlos Rivas	New York Red Bulls	Not Selected
Quillan Roberts	Los Angeles FC	Not Selected
Brian Rowe	Vancouver Whitecaps FC	Not Selected
Michael Salazar	Montreal Impact	Not Selected
Luis Silva	Real Salt Lake	Not Selected
Luis Solignac	Chicago Fire	Not Selected
Stephen Sunday	Real Salt Lake	Not Selected
Brian Sylvestre	LA Galaxy	Not Selected
Donny Toia	Orlando City SC	Selected by Real Salt Lake in Stage One
Johan Venegas	Minnesota United FC	Not Selected
David Villa	New York City FC	Not Selected
Jose Villarreal	Orlando City SC	Not Selected
Jared Watts	Houston Dynamo	Not Selected
Travis Worra	D.C. United	Not Selected
Joshua Yaro	Philadelphia Union	Not Selected

== Stage One ==
The first stage of the 2018 MLS Re-Entry Draft took place on December 14, 2018.

=== Round 1 ===
Pick #	Drafting Team	Player	Position	Former Team
1	San Jose Earthquakes	Pass		
2	Orlando City SC	Pass		
3	Colorado Rapids	Andre Rawls	GK	New York City FC
4	Chicago Fire	Pass		
5	Toronto FC	Nick DeLeon	D	D.C. United
6	Minnesota United FC	Pass		
7	Houston Dynamo	Pass		
8	New England Revolution	Pass		
9	Montreal Impact	Pass		
10	Vancouver Whitecaps FC	Pass		
11	LA Galaxy	Pass		
12	Philadelphia Union	Pass		
13	D.C. United	Pass		
14	FC Dallas	Pass		
15	Los Angeles FC	Pass		
16	Real Salt Lake	Donny Toia	D	Orlando City SC
17	Columbus Crew SC	Pass		
18	New York City FC	Pass		
19	Seattle Sounders FC	Pass		
20	Sporting Kansas City	Pass		
21	New York Red Bulls	Pass		
22	Portland Timbers	Pass		
23	Atlanta United FC	Pass		
24	FC Cincinnati	Pass		

=== Round 2 ===
Pick #	Drafting Team	Player	Position	Former Team
25	Colorado Rapids	Pass		
26	Toronto FC	Pass		
27	Real Salt Lake	Pass		

== Stage Two ==
The second stage of the 2018 MLS Re-Entry Draft took place on December 20, 2018.

=== Round 1 ===
Pick #	Drafting Team	Player	Position	Former Team
1	San Jose Earthquakes	Pass		
2	Orlando City SC	Pass		
3	Colorado Rapids	Pass		
4	Chicago Fire	Pass		
5	Toronto FC	Pass		
6	Minnesota United FC	Pass		
7	Houston Dynamo	Tommy McNamara	M	New York City FC
8	New England Revolution	Pass		
9	Montreal Impact	Pass		
10	Vancouver Whitecaps FC	Pass		
11	LA Galaxy	Matt Lampson	GK	Minnesota United FC
12	Philadelphia Union	Pass		
13	D.C. United	Pass		
14	FC Dallas	Pass		
15	Los Angeles FC	Pass		
16	Real Salt Lake	Pass		
17	Columbus Crew SC	Pass		
18	New York City FC	Pass		
19	Seattle Sounders FC	Pass		
20	Sporting Kansas City	Pass		
21	New York Red Bulls	Pass		
22	Portland Timbers	Pass		
23	Atlanta United FC	Pass		
24	FC Cincinnati	Pass		

=== Round 2 ===
Pick #	Drafting Team	Player	Position	Former Team
25	Houston Dynamo	Pass		
26	LA Galaxy	Pass		
