= Rawles =

Rawles is a surname, and may refer to:

- Amanda Rawles (born 2000), Indonesian actress and model
- Calida Rawles (born 1976), American visual artist
- James Wesley Rawles (born 1960), American novelist
- Nancy Rawles, American novelist

== See also ==
- Rawle
