= Tommy McNamara =

American soccer player (born 1991)

Thomas McNamara
Personal information
- Full name: Thomas Liam McNamara
- Date of birth: February 6, 1991 (age 35)
- Place of birth: West Nyack, New York, United States
- Height: 5 ft 9 in (1.75 m)
- Position: Midfielder

Team information
- Current team: Brooklyn FC
- Number: 7

College career
| Years | Team | Apps | (Gls) |
| 2009–2012 | Brown Bears | 42 | (9) |
| 2013 | Clemson Tigers | 21 | (7) |

Senior career*
| Years | Team | Apps | (Gls) |
| 2011 | Western Mass Pioneers | 9 | (2) |
| 2012 | Worcester Hydra | 1 | (0) |
| 2013 | Jersey Express | 4 | (4) |
| 2014 | Chivas USA | 6 | (1) |
| 2015–2018 | New York City FC | 86 | (13) |
| 2015 | → Wilmington Hammerheads (loan) | 3 | (0) |
| 2019–2020 | Houston Dynamo | 37 | (2) |
| 2020–2024 | New England Revolution | 90 | (6) |
| 2023 | New England Revolution II | 2 | (0) |
| 2025 | Las Vegas Lights | 10 | (0) |
| 2026– | Brooklyn FC | 28 | (3) |
- * Club domestic league appearances and goals as of November 4, 2026

Thomas Liam McNamara (born February 6, 1991) is an American professional soccer player who plays as a midfielder for Brooklyn FC in the USL Championship and is the captain.

== Career ==
=== Early career ===
Thomas McNamara was born in West Nyack, NY. McNamara played high school soccer at Don Bosco Prep in Ramsey, NJ, and played club soccer for FC Westchester. McNamara played college soccer at Brown University for four years before spending a fifth year playing college soccer for Clemson University in 2013. He was a First Team All-Ivy selection as a senior and finished his career at Brown with 12 goals and 10 assists. He scored seven goals while recording eight assists in his final season of college soccer at Clemson. He is only the second Clemson soccer player to be named an All-American both on and off the field in the same season. In 2013, he was named Second Team All-American by the NSCAA and a First Team Academic All-American. McNamara is the first Clemson soccer player selected to the Capital One Academic First Team since 1987 when Jamey Rootes was selected. Rootes was the President of the NFL's Houston Texans. McNamara also played in the USL PDL with the Jersey Express in 2013.

=== Chivas USA ===
McNamara was drafted first in the second round of the 2014 MLS SuperDraft by Chivas USA, and was officially signed on February 14, 2014. He made his professional debut for the team on March 9, 2014, against the Chicago Fire in which he also scored his first professional goal in the 60th minute on the way to a 3–2 opening day victory. On April 12, McNamara tore the ACL in his right knee, requiring him to undergo surgery to repair his ACL.

=== New York City FC ===
After the contraction of Chivas USA following the 2014 Major League Soccer season, McNamara was selected by D.C. United in the 2014 MLS Dispersal Draft. Leading up to the 2015 Expansion of Major League Soccer Draft, McNamara was left unprotected by D.C. United. New York City FC selected him with their eighth pick in the 2014 MLS Expansion Draft.

McNamara scored his first goal for New York City FC on June 6, 2015, against the Philadelphia Union. The goal, scored from about 25 yards out, was awarded MLS goal of the week honors. This right-footed curling shot into the top corner has become a signature of McNamara's, as he has scored near identical goals from similar areas of the pitch against Chicago Fire, Portland Timbers New York Red Bulls, and Colorado Rapids.

=== Houston Dynamo ===
McNamara was selected by Houston Dynamo in the second-round of the 2018 MLS Re-Entry Draft on December 20, 2018. He signed with the Dynamo on January 11, 2019 He made his Dynamo debut on February 19, coming on as a substitute in a 1–0 win over C.D. Guastatoya in a CONCACAF Champions League match. McNamara scored his first goal for Houston on May 18 in a 2–1 win over D.C. United. On July 20, he scored a goal and had an assist as the Dynamo defeated Toronto FC 3–1. McNamara would return to NYCFC on August 8 and would mark the occasion by picking up his second assist of the season. However, the Dynamo would lose by a score of 3–2. McNamara would lead the team with 39 appearances across all competitions, and finished the year with 2 goals and 3 assists. It was a poor season for Houston as a team, finishing 10th in the Western Conference and missing out on the playoffs.

McNamara started the first two games of the 2020 season before the season was paused due to the COVID-19 pandemic. The league returned to play in July with the MLS is Back Tournament, where McNamara made a substitute appearance in 2 of Houston's 3 games.

=== New England Revolution ===
On August 17, 2020, McNamara acquired by New England via trade with Houston on Aug. 17, 2020. He played a key role for the New England Revolution during their record-breaking 2021 season, helping the club secure its first-ever Supporters' Shield. He re-signed with the Revolution on December 22. New England declined McNamara's contract option following their 2024 season.

=== Las Vegas Lights ===
On August 13, 2025, McNamara joined USL Championship side Las Vegas Lights until the end of the 2025 season, with an option to stay on for the 2026 season.

=== Brooklyn FC ===
Mcnamara Joined Brooklyn FC on January 15, 2026 for their inaugural season.

== International career ==
McNamara is an American and Irish passport holder, as his paternal grandfather was born in Ireland. He has expressed interest in playing for either national team.

== Career statistics ==
As of November 18, 2021

| Club | Season | League | | | U.S. Open Cup | | Continental | | Other | | Total | |
| Club | Season | Division | Apps | Goals | Apps | Goals | Apps | Goals | Apps | Goals | Apps | Goals |
|---|---|---|---|---|---|---|---|---|---|---|---|---|
| Chivas USA | 2014 | MLS | 6 | 1 | 0 | 0 | — | | — | | 6 | 1 |
| Wilmington Hammerheads (loan) | 2015 | USL | 3 | 0 | — | | — | | — | | 3 | 0 |
| New York City FC | 2015 | MLS | 19 | 5 | 0 | 0 | — | | — | | 19 | 5 |
| New York City FC | 2016 | MLS | 30 | 5 | 0 | 0 | — | | 1 (Note: Appearance(s) in MLS Cup playoffs) | 0 | 31 | 5 |
| New York City FC | 2017 | MLS | 27 | 3 | 1 | 0 | — | | 0 | 0 | 28 | 3 |
| New York City FC | 2018 | MLS | 10 | 0 | 1 | 0 | — | | 0 | 0 | 11 | 0 |
| New York City FC | Total | | 86 | 13 | 2 | 0 | — | | 1 | 0 | 89 | 13 |
| Houston Dynamo | 2019 | MLS | 33 | 2 | 2 | 0 | 4 (Note: Appearances in CONCACAF Champions League) | 0 | — | | 39 | 2 |
| Houston Dynamo | 2020 | MLS | 4 | 0 | 0 | 0 | — | | 0 | 0 | 4 | 0 |
| Houston Dynamo | Total | | 37 | 2 | 2 | 0 | 4 | 0 | 0 | 0 | 43 | 2 |
| New England Revolution | 2020 | MLS | 14 | 0 | — | | — | | 4 | 0 | 18 | 0 |
| New England Revolution | 2021 | MLS | 32 | 2 | — | | — | | — | | 32 | 3 |
| New England Revolution | Total | | 46 | 2 | — | | — | | 4 | 0 | 50 | 2 |
| Career total | | | 178 | 18 | 4 | 0 | 4 | 0 | 4 | 0 | 190 | 18 |

== Honors ==
New England Revolution

- Supporters' Shield: 2021

Individual

- NYCFC Player of the Month: June 2015, March 2016
- Major League Soccer Goal of the Week: 2015 Week 14, 2016 Week 4
