= Calida Rawles =

American hyperrealist painter (born 1976)

- Born: 1976 (age 49–50); Wilmington, Delaware
- Education: Spelman College (BA); New York University (MFA)
- Known for: Painting

Calida Garcia Rawles (born 1976 in Wilmington, Delaware) is a Los Angeles-based contemporary visual artist. In her large-scale paintings and murals, Rawles merges hyperrealism and abstraction. The artist is interested in questions of identity and race in relation to Western art history. Her portraits often depict representations of water and Black life. She is a practicing artist and a mother.

== Early life and education ==
Burton Payne and Martha Turner Payne, born in 1827 and 1833 respectively, were Rawles's mother's great grandparents. The artist keeps a picture of them in her studio. Her personal experience with swimming started when she was seven years old while learning to swim, an activity she still practices as an adult and in which she finds comfort.

Rawles earned a studio art bachelor's degree in 1998 from Spelman College, Atlanta, where she was exposed to the work of Black women artists such as Carrie Mae Weems and Elizabeth Catlett. She holds an MFA in painting from New York University (2000). While attending art school in the American South, Rawles started reflecting on the role of spirituality and belief systems concerning art. In a 2023 interview, she stated

“I was not raised in a religious household, but in the South, hearing and talking about God and spirituality was regular, and it was in the culture.” Now “I find that a lot in my work—I am reaching for a larger understanding of life and a connection to something larger than myself.”

In 2004, right after graduating from NYU, the artist relocated from New York to Inglewood, next to Los Angeles, with her with her husband and stepson. After working as a graphic designer little while, she established an art studio in an industrial building. This very city still functions as Rawles's production and experimentation site to this day.

== Artistic practice ==
Calida Rawles's figurative paintings of Black women, children, and men submerged in bodies of water that populate the whole canvas space have grown over the years. Her paintings usually depart from photoshoots, gathering up to hundreds of photographs before the artist decides what goes in the painting. Black culture, life, joy, history, and memorialization are major themes in her work.

The artist often inserts her paintings within a larger context of Black America's challenging relationship with water. From segregation in public pools to environmental justice, from the Transatlantic Slave Trade to Jim Crow laws.

Literature plays a central role in Rawles's creative process. Her works are often inspired by fictional and non-fictional stories. Among her artistic influences are visual artists Adrian Piper and Ana Mendieta, and writers James Baldwin, Claude Brown, E.L. Doctorow. Octavia Butler, and Toni Morrison. In her studio practice, the artist alternates between listening to music and audiobooks such as the Parable of the Sower and Parable of the Talents by Butler, Bad Feminist by Roxane Gay, Americanah by Chimamanda Ngozi Adichie, and Circe and Song of Achilles by Madeleine Miller.

== Career ==
Her painting The Water Dancer (2019) illustrated the cover of Ta-Nehisi Coates's debut novel. The picture depicts a Black man under the water, and it relates to the story of protagonist Hiram Walker, an enslaved man carrying the memory of a drowning accident.

In 2020, her first major solo show "A Dream for My Lilith," was presented by Various Small Fires gallery, in Los Angeles. Featured in the exhibition, was the painting Guardian that depicts a Black pregnant woman dressed in a white gown holding her own belly under the water.

Her first solo show in New York "On the Other Side of Everything" was presented in 2021 at Lehmann Maupin gallery and featured four paintings expanding on Rawles's investigations about race, gender, and storytelling through works depicting Black subjects in large blue imaginary seas and bodies of water.

In 2022, Rawles was invited to create a mural at Inglewood's new SoFi Stadium, in California, part of the Hollywood Park art program. She was one of six local artists to paint murals for the community. Rawles's work was included in the 12th Berlin Biennale for Contemporary Art, Germany. The curatorial narrative explored the relationship between her work, the transatlantic slave trade and the Middle Passage. She was also a Visiting Artist at Anderson Ranch Arts Center, Colorado, in 2022.

She presented a new body of work in the solo show "A Certain Oblivion" at Lehmann Maupin gallery in New York, in the fall of 2023. Her large paintings measuring about nine feet extended the artist's visual and poetic investigation of life and water, blues and blacks, women and girls. Her daughters appeared as central figures in two of the paintings in the exhibition.

Her work Thy Name We Praise was featured in the show "Black American Portraits" at her alma mater Spelman College Museum of Fine Art in 2023.

The Delaware Contemporary, a museum in the artist's hometown, has organized a viewing of three of her paintings at the Platform Gallery for 2024. The works feature family members and known figures from the cultural sector. This is the first installation Calida Rawles presents in her birth state of Delaware.

In October 2023, the Pérez Art Museum Miami announced Calida Rawles's first solo museum show for the PAMM 2024 exhibition calendar. The show aims to honor South Florida communities, the region's history and culture as well as its natural environments and landscapes. The paintings in the show will orbit around the life stories of citizens from Overtown, a historically Black neighborhood in Miami, to comment on the experience and resilience of Black people in America. According to the press release, the artist will showcase a new body of work experimenting with photographs of natural waters for the first time, such as Virginia Key Beach. Calida Rawles: Away With the Tides was open in June 2024 with a new body of work from her continuing investigation of portraiture, memorialization, and depictions of bodies underwater. New to the artist's practice, a video is installed in one of PAMM's galleries.

== Notable works in collections ==
- On the Other Side of Everything (2021), Pérez Art Museum Miami, Florida
- The Space in Which We Travel, Los Angeles County Museum of Art, California
- In His Image, Dallas Museum of Art, Texas
- High Tide, Heavy Armor (2021), San Francisco Museum of Modern Art, California
- Studio Museum in Harlem, New York
- Thy Name We Praise (2023), co-acquired by the Terra Foundation for American Art and Spelman College Museum of Fine Art, Georgia
