= Federico Bravo =

Argentine footballer

Personal information
- Date of birth: 5 October 1993 (age 33)
- Place of birth: Jesús María, Argentina
- Height: 1.84 m (6 ft 0 in)
- Position: Defensive midfielder

Team information
- Current team: Patronato

Youth career
- Boca Juniors

Senior career*
Years	Team	Apps	(Gls)
2013–2016	Boca Juniors	34	(0)
2016	→ New York City (loan)	23	(0)
2017–2018	Panetolikos	23	(0)
2018–2019	Patronato	16	(1)
2019–2020	Atlético Tucumán	13	(0)
2020	Riga FC	2	(0)
2021–2022	Sarmiento	26	(0)
2022–2023	Deportes Antofagasta	25	(0)
2023	San Martín Tucumán	11	(0)
2023–2024	Aldosivi	12	(0)
2024–2025	Puerto Cabello	26	(1)
2025–2026	Chacarita Juniors	29	(2)
2026–	Patronato	5	(1)
- * Club domestic league appearances and goals as of 17:46, 23 March 2026 (UTC)

Federico Bravo (born 5 October 1993) is an Argentine professional footballer who plays as a defensive midfielder for Patronato.

== Club career ==
=== Boca Juniors ===
Bravo was born in Jesús María. He is a Boca Juniors youth exponent. He made his team debut during the 2012–13 season.

==== Loan to New York City ====
On 20 February 2016, Bravo joined New York City FC of Major League Soccer on loan for the 2016 season. He made his debut as a substitute for Khiry Shelton in the 89th minute of a 4–3 win against Chicago. His first start came a week later in a 2–2 draw with Toronto FC, picking up a yellow card.

Bravo received a red card on 10 September for a tackle on Gershon Koffie, in a 3–1 loss to New England.

=== Panetolikos ===
On 6 February 2017, he signed an 18-month contract with Panetolikos.

=== CA Patronato ===
Bravo signed for Patronato on 16 July 2018.
