= Rónald Matarrita =

Costa Rican footballer (born 1994)

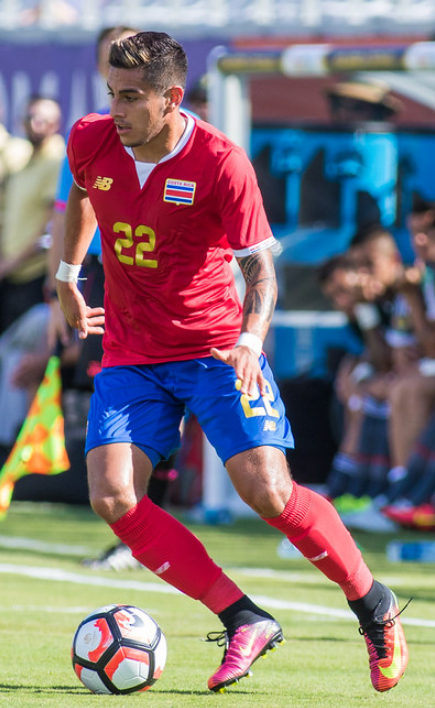
- Matarrita with Costa Rica at the Copa América Centenario in 2016.

Personal information
- Full name: Rónald Alberto Matarrita Ulate
- Date of birth: 9 July 1994 (age 32)
- Place of birth: Alajuela, Costa Rica
- Height: 1.75 m (5 ft 9 in)
- Positions: Left-back; wing-back

Team information
- Current team: Alajuelense
- Number: 22

Senior career*
| Years | Team | Apps | (Gls) |
| 2012–2016 | Alajuelense | 67 | (4) |
| 2016–2020 | New York City | 106 | (4) |
| 2021–2022 | FC Cincinnati | 31 | (3) |
| 2023 | Dnipro-1 | 9 | (0) |
| 2023–2024 | Aris | 1 | (0) |
| 2024– | Alajuelense | 64 | (0) |

International career^{‡}
| 2010–2011 | Costa Rica U17 | 3 | (0) |
| 2012 | Costa Rica U20 | 2 | (0) |
| 2015 | Costa Rica U22 | 3 | (1) |
| 2015–2026 | Costa Rica | 58 | (3) |
- * Club domestic league appearances and goals as of 20 September 2026 ‡ National team caps and goals as of 23:00, 4 October 2026 (UTC)

Rónald Alberto Matarrita Ulate (born 9 July 1994) is a Costa Rican professional footballer who plays as a left-back for Liga FPD club Alajuelense and the Costa Rica national team.

== Club career ==
=== New York City FC ===
Matarrita was signed to New York City FC from Alajuelense on 20 January 2016 for an undisclosed fee. Matarrita made his MLS debut against the Chicago Fire on 6 March 2016. He scored his first goal for New York City during a 2–0 victory over Seattle Sounders FC on 25 June 2016. After a strong first season, he was named New York City's Defensive Player of the Year for 2016.

=== FC Cincinnati ===
On 29 December 2020, Matarrita was traded to FC Cincinnati in exchange for $500,000 of General Allocation Money. He was released by Cincinnati following their 2022 season.

=== Aris ===
On 20 June 2023, Matarrita joined Super League Greece club Aris on a three-year contract.

== International career ==
Matarrita has represented Costa Rica at under-17, under-20, under-22, and senior levels. He made his senior debut on 5 September 2015 in a friendly against Brazil. He scored his first goal for Costa Rica 6 September 2016, in a 3–1 win over Panama, in a World Cup qualification match. Matarrita was called up for the 2018 FIFA World Cup, but was ruled out of the tournament three days before Costa Rica's debut due to a harmstring injury.

== Career statistics ==
=== Club ===
As of match played 20 September 2026

Appearances and goals by club, season and competition
| Club | Season | League | | | National cup (Note: Includes U.S. Open Cup, Costa Rican Cup) | | Continental | | Other | | Total | |
| Club | Season | Division | Apps | Goals | Apps | Goals | Apps | Goals | Apps | Goals | Apps | Goals |
|---|---|---|---|---|---|---|---|---|---|---|---|---|
| Alajuelense | 2013–14 | Liga FPD | 11 | 0 | — | | 1 (Note: Appearance(s) in CONCACAF Champions League) | 0 | — | | 12 | 0 |
| Alajuelense | 2014–15 | Liga FPD | 36 | 3 | — | | 4 | 0 | — | | 40 | 3 |
| Alajuelense | 2015–16 | Liga FPD | 20 | 1 | — | | — | | — | | 20 | 1 |
| Alajuelense | Total | | 67 | 4 | — | | 5 | 0 | — | | 72 | 4 |
| New York City | 2016 | Major League Soccer | 25 | 1 | — | | — | | 2 (Note: Appearances in MLS Cup Playoffs) | 0 | 27 | 1 |
| New York City | 2017 | Major League Soccer | 12 | 0 | — | | — | | 2 | 0 | 14 | 0 |
| New York City | 2018 | Major League Soccer | 24 | 2 | — | | — | | 2 | 0 | 26 | 2 |
| New York City | 2019 | Major League Soccer | 24 | 1 | 1 | 0 | — | | 1 | 0 | 26 | 1 |
| New York City | 2020 | Major League Soccer | 21 | 0 | — | | 4 | 0 | 3 (Note: Two appearances in MLS is Back Tournament knockout stage, one appearance in MLS Cup Playoffs) | 0 | 28 | 0 |
| New York City | Total | | 106 | 4 | 1 | 0 | 4 | 0 | 10 | 0 | 121 | 4 |
| FC Cincinnati | 2021 | Major League Soccer | 22 | 2 | — | | — | | — | | 22 | 2 |
| FC Cincinnati | 2022 | Major League Soccer | 9 | 1 | — | | — | | — | | 9 | 1 |
| FC Cincinnati | Total | | 31 | 3 | — | | — | | — | | 31 | 3 |
| Dnipro-1 | 2022–23 | Ukrainian Premier League | 9 | 0 | — | | — | | — | | 9 | 0 |
| Aris | 2023–24 | Super League Greece | 1 | 0 | 0 | 0 | 4 (Note: Appearances in UEFA Europa Conference League) | 0 | — | | 5 | 0 |
| Alajuelense | 2024–25 | Liga FPD | 23 | 0 | 0 | 0 | 1 (Note: Appearances in CONCACAF Central American Cup) | 0 | 0 | 0 | 24 | 0 |
| Alajuelense | 2025–26 | Liga FPD | 35 | 0 | 0 | 0 | 8 (Note: Two appearances in CONCACAF Champions Cup, six appeqarances in CONCACAF Central American Cup) | 0 | — | | 43 | 0 |
| Alajuelense | 2026–27 | Liga FPD | 6 | 0 | 0 | 0 | 4 (Note: Appearances in CONCACAF Central American Cup) | 1 | 1 (Note: Appearance in Supercopa de Costa Rica) | 0 | 11 | 1 |
| Alajuelense | Total | | 64 | 0 | 0 | 0 | 13 | 1 | 1 | 0 | 78 | 1 |
| Career total | | | 280 | 11 | 1 | 0 | 26 | 1 | 11 | 0 | 318 | 12 |

=== International ===
As of 4 October 2026

Appearances and goals by national team and year
| National team | Year | Apps | Goals |
|---|---|---|---|
| Costa Rica | 2015 | 6 | 0 |
| Costa Rica | 2016 | 11 | 2 |
| Costa Rica | 2017 | 4 | 0 |
| Costa Rica | 2018 | 6 | 1 |
| Costa Rica | 2019 | 9 | 0 |
| Costa Rica | 2020 | 1 | 0 |
| Costa Rica | 2021 | 12 | 0 |
| Costa Rica | 2022 | 5 | 0 |
| Costa Rica | 2023 | 2 | 0 |
| Costa Rica | 2024 | 2 | 0 |
| Costa Rica | 2026 | 1 | 0 |
| Total | | 58 | 3 |

Scores and results list Costa Rica's goal tally first, score column indicates score after each Matarrita goal.

List of international goals scored by Rónald Matarrita
| No. | Date | Venue | Opponent | Score | Result | Competition |
|---|---|---|---|---|---|---|
| 1 | 6 September 2016 | Estadio Nacional, San José, Costa Rica | Panama | 3–0 | 3–1 | 2018 FIFA World Cup qualification |
| 2 | 11 November 2016 | Hasely Crawford Stadium, Port of Spain, Trinidad and Tobago | Trinidad and Tobago | 2–0 | 2–0 | 2018 FIFA World Cup qualification |
| 3 | 16 November 2018 | Estadio El Teniente, Rancagua, Chile | Chile | 3–0 | 3–2 | Friendly |

== Personal ==
Matarrita earned his U.S. green card in March 2017. This status also qualifies him as a domestic player for MLS roster purposes.

== Honours ==
Alajuelense

- Costa Rican Primera División: 2013–14 Invierno

Individual

- CONCACAF Best XI: 2016
- MLS Team of the Week 2016: Week 6, Week 10, Week 16,
