= Khiry Shelton =

American soccer player (born 1993)

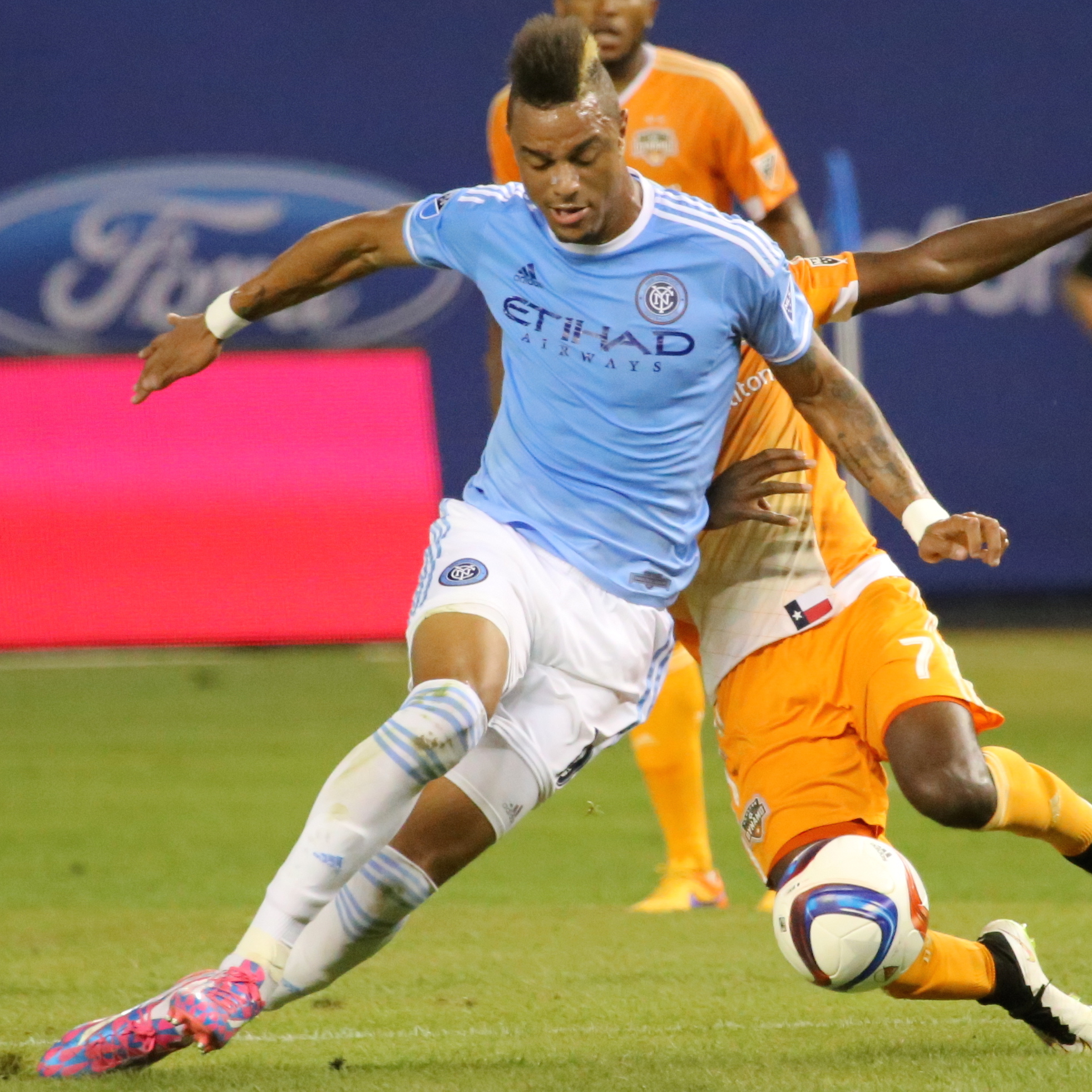
- Shelton with New York City FC in 2015

Personal information
- Full name: Khiry Lamar Shelton
- Date of birth: June 26, 1993 (age 33)
- Place of birth: Fort Carson, Colorado, United States
- Height: 1.91 m (6 ft 3 in)
- Positions: Forward; winger

Youth career
- 2009–2011: Lonestar SC

College career
Years	Team	Apps	(Gls)
2011–2014	Oregon State Beavers	52	(19)

Senior career*
Years	Team	Apps	(Gls)
2012–2013	Austin Aztex	7	(4)
2014	Lane United	5	(3)
2015–2017	New York City FC	54	(6)
2018	Sporting Kansas City	20	(2)
2018	→ Swope Park Rangers	2	(0)
2019	SC Paderborn	4	(0)
2020–2025	Sporting Kansas City	145	(10)
2026-	Kansas City Comets		

International career
2010–2011	United States U18	3	(0)
2015–2016	United States U23	4	(0)
- * Club domestic league appearances and goals as of October 23, 2025

Khiry Lamar Shelton (/ˈkaɪri ˈʃɛltən/; born June 26, 1993) is an American professional soccer player for Kansas City Comets. He has also represented the United States at the under-18 and under-23 levels.

== Club career ==
=== College and amateur ===
Shelton was born in Fort Carson, Colorado and raised in Leander, Texas. He attended high school at Vista Ridge in Cedar Park, Texas, becoming a four-year letterman for their soccer team, while in 2010 he was selected as Offensive MVP and was a first-team member of the All District select. Joining Lonestar SC, he was a member of the academy and played for them at under-17/18 level, winning the Disney Showcase Championship with them in 2010.

Joining Oregon State University, he worked his way immediately into their soccer program, starting the first six games of the season before an injury took him off the active roster for the rest of the season. In his second year, he received a Pac-12 Honorable Mention for his fifteen appearances, scoring in his first three appearances and finishing the season as the joint second highest scorer for the team. His third year saw him make ten appearances and equal his four goals from the season before.

=== New York City FC ===
On January 15, 2015, Shelton was selected 2nd overall by New York City FC in the 2015 MLS SuperDraft, with the expansion club turning down an offer of a considerable amount of allocation money in exchange for their pick to instead draft the player who Head Coach Jason Kreis described as "our top guy".

He made his debut for the club coming in their first Major League Soccer match, away to fellow expansion team Orlando City SC at the Citrus Bowl; he came on as a 62nd-minute substitute for Mehdi Ballouchy in an eventual 1–1 draw. Shelton totalled 17 games in his first season as his team missed out on the MLS Cup Playoffs, and scored one goal: on May 15 at Yankee Stadium against the Chicago Fire, he replaced Patrick Mullins after 60 minutes, and in added time he equalized for a 2–2 draw from David Villa's pass.

=== Sporting Kansas City ===
On December 14, 2017, Shelton was traded to Sporting Kansas City in exchange for Saad Abdul-Salaam.

=== SC Paderborn ===
On January 5, 2019, Shelton signed a contract through 30 June 2021 with 2. Bundesliga side SC Paderborn 07.

=== Return to Sporting Kansas City ===
On December 9, 2019, it was announced that Shelton would return to Sporting Kansas City on a contract through to 2022 with an option for 2023. Following the 2025 season, Kansas City opted to release him from the club.

=== Kansas City Comets ===
On October 26, 2026, Shelton signed with the Kansas City Comets.

== International career ==
Shelton was called up to the United States under-18 team in 2010, attending a training camp with them in California before flying out to Israel in December 2010 to compete in an international tournament against the hosts plus France and Germany. He played in all three games, but failed to score in any.

Some five years later, his drafting by New York City FC led to Shelton receiving a call-up to the United States under-23 in their games against Bosnia and Herzegovina and Denmark in March 2015. Shelton was brought on from the substitutes bench after 61 minutes against Bosnia and played the full match against Denmark, though again he failed to score on either occasion.

In January 2016, Shelton received his first call up to the senior United States squad for friendlies against Iceland and Canada.

== Career statistics ==
=== Club ===
As of match played September 29, 2019

Appearances and goals by club, season and competition
Club	Season	League			National cup		League cup		Continental		Total	
Club	Season	Division	Apps	Goals	Apps	Goals	Apps	Goals	Apps	Goals	Apps	Goals
New York City FC	2015	Major League Soccer	17	1	0	0	—		—		17	1
New York City FC	2016	Major League Soccer	22	4	1	0	2	0	—		25	4
New York City FC	2017	Major League Soccer	15	1	0	0	0	0	—		15	1
Sporting Kansas City	2018	Major League Soccer	20	2	1	0	3	0	—		24	2
Swope Park Rangers (loan)	2018	USL	2	0	—		—		—		2	0
SC Paderborn	2018–19	2. Bundesliga	2	0	—		—		—		2	0
SC Paderborn	2019–20	Bundesliga	1	0	1	0	—		—		2	0
Career total			79	8	3	0	5	0	0	0	87	8
