= Sarah Rawls =

American celebrity chef

Sarah Rawls was one of the first Black celebrity chefs. Rawls was an accomplished restaurateur, with several successful establishments starting in the Bay Area in the 1970s. Host of the television series Down Home Cooking, Rawls expanded the reach of her show to syndication in 26 cities in 1981. The cooking show featured guest appearances by the likes of Andrae Crouch and Richard Kline. In addition to making commercials for Ac'cent seasoning (one alongside Sammy Davis Jr.), she was the author of Sarah Rawls' Down to Earth Cook Book, Down Home Recipes: Sarah Rawls' Family-pleasing Meals, and Talkin' Turkey.
