= Rall =

Rall is a surname. Notable people with the surname include:

- David Rall (1926–1999), American environmental health scientist and administrator
- Günther Rall (1918–2009), German military pilot
- Johann Rall (1726–1776), German officer of Hessian troops in the American revolutionary war
- Ted Rall (born 1963), American cartoonist
- Tommy Rall (1929–2020), American dancer
- Wilfrid Rall, American neuroscientist
- Yuri Rall (1890–1948), Soviet naval officer

== See also ==
- RAL (disambiguation)
- Rallentando, a musical term meaning to slow the tempo of a piece of music
