= Ethan White =

American soccer player (born 1991)

Personal information
- Date of birth: January 1, 1991 (age 35)
- Place of birth: Kensington, Maryland, U.S.
- Height: 6 ft 0 in (1.83 m)
- Position: Defender

Youth career
- 2008–2009: D.C. United

College career
Years	Team	Apps	(Gls)
2009–2010	Maryland Terrapins		

Senior career*
Years	Team	Apps	(Gls)
2011–2013	D.C. United	38	(1)
2012	→ Richmond Kickers (loan)	6	(0)
2014–2015	Philadelphia Union	28	(0)
2014	→ City Islanders (loan)	1	(0)
2016–2017	New York City FC	34	(0)
Total		107	(1)

International career^{‡}
2010	United States U20	2	(0)
- * Club domestic league appearances and goals as of 16:43, 29 October 2017 (UTC) ‡ National team caps and goals as of December 17, 2010

Norris Ethan White (born January 1, 1991) is an American former professional soccer player who played as a defender. He last played for New York City FC in Major League Soccer.

== Youth and college soccer ==
In high school, White was a four-year starter for the Bethesda-Chevy Chase Barons in the Montgomery County 3A Division, leading the team to the 2007 Maryland 3A State Championship defeating Bel Air High School 1–0. In 2009, White was one of 3 players to start all 23 matches for Maryland and was named to the All-ACC Freshman team. In 2010, he was named to the All-ACC Second Team.

== Club career ==
=== D.C United ===
White signed a homegrown player contract with D.C. United on December 14, 2010. He made his professional debut on April 6, 2011, in a Lamar Hunt U.S. Open Cup game against Philadelphia Union, and made his MLS debut on April 9 in a game against Los Angeles Galaxy.

White played in 24 games for D.C. United in 2011 logging 1928 minutes as a rookie.

White sent on a short loan with USL Pro club Richmond Kickers on June 14, 2012.

In 2013, White featured in 14 games for D.C. United logging 1099 minutes. White started in the Lamar Hunt U.S. Open Cup final that D.C. United won.

=== Philadelphia Union ===
On January 14, 2014, White was traded with the #1 spot in the MLS Allocation Ranking to Philadelphia Union in exchange for Jeff Parke and the #6 Allocation Ranking.

In May 2014 White was loaned to USL team Harrisburg City Islanders. He made one appearance on May 2, against Charleston Battery receiving a red card in the 66th minute.

White made his debut with Philadelphia on July 12, 2014, in a 3–3 draw against the Colorado Rapids.

=== New York City FC ===
On December 10, 2015, White was traded to New York City FC in exchange for a fourth-round selection in the 2017 MLS SuperDraft. He made his debut in the season opening, 4–3 win over Chicago on March 6, 2016. White was released by NYCFC on November 27, 2017. White is reportedly pursuing photography rather than soccer.

== International ==
White was part of the U-20 United States Youth National Team player pool. He played on the 2010 Milk Cup team that won in Northern Ireland. He was also a member of the U-18 United States Youth National Team player pool.

== Career statistics ==
As of 1 October 2017

Team	Season	League			MLS Cup		US Open Cup		Continental		Total	
Team	Season	Division	Apps	Goals	Apps	Goals	Apps	Goals	Apps	Goals	Apps	Goals
D.C. United	2011	MLS	24	1	—		0	0	—		24	1
D.C. United	2012	MLS	0	0	0	0	1	0	—		1	0
D.C. United	2013	MLS	14	0	—		2	0	—		16	0
D.C. United	Total		38	1	0	0	3	0	0	0	41	1
Richmond Kickers (loan)	2012	USL	6	0	—		—		—		6	0
Richmond Kickers (loan)	Total		6	0	0	0	0	0	0	0	6	0
Philadelphia Union	2014	MLS	12	0	—		2	0	—		14	0
Philadelphia Union	2015	MLS	16	0	—		1	0	—		17	0
Philadelphia Union	Total		28	0	0	0	3	0	0	0	31	0
Harrisburg City Islanders (loan)	2014	USL	1	0	—		—		—		1	0
Harrisburg City Islanders (loan)	Total		1	0	0	0	0	0	0	0	1	0
New York City FC	2016	MLS	13	0	0	0	1	0	—		14	0
New York City FC	2017	MLS	20	0	0	0	1	0	—		21	0
New York City FC	Total		33	0	0	0	2	0	0	0	35	0
Career Total			106	1	0	0	8	0	0	0	114	1

== Honors ==
=== Individual ===
- 2009 NCAA freshman of the year

=== Club ===
==== D.C. United ====
- Lamar Hunt U.S. Open Cup (1): 2013
