= Diego Martínez (footballer, born 1992) =

Argentine footballer

Personal information
- Full name: Hermes Diego Martínez
- Date of birth: 5 July 1992 (age 34)
- Place of birth: General Pacheco, Buenos Aires, Argentina
- Height: 1.76 m (5 ft 9 in)
- Position: Full back

Team information
- Current team: Deportivo Madryn

Youth career
- River Plate

Senior career*
Years	Team	Apps	(Gls)
2012–2016	River Plate	11	(0)
2013–2014	→ Sarmiento (loan)	19	(0)
2014–2015	→ Patronato (loan)	43	(2)
2016	New York City FC	4	(0)
2017	Sportivo Estudiantes		
2017–2018	San Martín de Tucumán	10	(0)
2018–2022	Nueva Chicago	57	(3)
2022–2023	Villa Dálmine	30	(1)
2023–2024	Almagro	21	(0)
2024–2025	Patronato	34	(1)
2025–	Deportivo Madryn	44	(1)
- * Club domestic league appearances and goals as of 16:32, 27 April 2026 (UTC)

Hermes Diego Martínez (born 5 July 1992) is an Argentine professional football player who plays as a defender for Deportivo Madryn.

== Club career ==
=== River Plate ===
Martínez made his debut appearance on 16 May 2012, turning out in the quarter-finals of the Copa Argentina against San Lorenzo in a match which ended in a 2–0 victory. He then made his league debut on 23 September 2012 in a game against Racing.

Martínez also participated in the 2012 U-20 Copa Libertadores, winning it in his first and only attempt and beating Defensor Sporting in the final.

==== Loan to Sarmiento ====
After manager Ramon Diaz made it clear that Martínez was not in his first team plans for the Torneo Inicial stage of the league campaign, he was loaned out to Sarmiento of the Primera B Nacional with whom he played 18 games.

==== Loan to Patronato ====
The following season, Martínez was loaned out to Patronato de Parana, also of the B Nacional.

=== New York City FC ===
On 22 January 2016, Martínez was unveiled as a signing for Major League Soccer side New York City FC, joining on a free transfer. Following a season where he struggled to crack the starting eleven, he was released from his contract with New York City on 28 November 2016.

== Statistics ==
=== Club ===
As of match played 16 October 2016.

Club	Season	League			Cup		Other		Total	
Club	Season	Division	Apps	Goals	Apps	Goals	Apps	Goals	Apps	Goals
River Plate	2011–12	Primera B Nacional	0	0	1	0	—		1	0
River Plate	2012–13	Argentine Primera División	11	0	1	0	—		12	0
River Plate	Total		11	0	2	0	—		13	0
Sarmiento (loan)	2013–14	Primera B Nacional	19	0	0	0	—		19	0
Sarmiento (loan)	Total		19	0	0	0	—		19	0
Patronato de Parana (loan)	2014	Primera B Nacional	16	0	0	0	—		16	0
Patronato de Parana (loan)	2015	Primera B Nacional	27	2	1	0	—		28	2
Patronato de Parana (loan)	Total		43	2	1	0	—		44	2
New York City FC	2016	Major League Soccer	3	0	1	0	—		4	0
New York City FC	Total		4	0	1	0	—		5	0
Career total			77	2	4	0	0	0	81	2

== Honours ==
River Plate

- U-20 Copa Libertadores: 2012
