= Andre Rawls =

American soccer player (born 1991)

Personal information
- Date of birth: December 20, 1991 (age 34)
- Place of birth: San Ramon, California, U.S.
- Height: 6 ft 2 in (1.88 m)
- Position: Goalkeeper

Youth career
- Walnut Creek Azzurri

College career
Years	Team	Apps	(Gls)
2010–2014	Saint Mary's Gaels	50	(0)

Senior career*
Years	Team	Apps	(Gls)
2015	Wilmington Hammerheads	22	(0)
2016–2018	New York City FC	0	(0)
2018	→ Orange County SC (loan)	26	(0)
2019–2021	Colorado Rapids	0	(0)
2019	→ Colorado Springs Switchbacks (loan)	15	(0)
2021	→ Phoenix Rising (loan)	21	(0)
- * Club domestic league appearances and goals as of November 8, 2021

Andre Rawls (born December 20, 1991) is an American soccer player who plays as a goalkeeper.

== Career ==
=== College ===
Rawls spent his entire college career at Saint Mary's College, including a red-shirted year in 2010. Rawls was named the WCC goalkeeper of the year in 2014 and earned first team all-Far West Region honors by the National Soccer Coaches Association of America. He set a program record for career goals-against average at 0.98 and registered 25 career wins and 17 shut-outs.

=== Professional ===
On January 20, 2015, Rawls was selected in the third round (44th overall) of the 2015 MLS SuperDraft by New York City FC. He wasn't picked up by New York City, instead signing with their USL affiliate club Wilmington Hammerheads on April 3, 2015. Rawls made 22 appearances for Wilmington in 2015, posting four clean sheets.

Rawls signed with New York City FC on March 3, 2016. Rawls did not appear for NYCFC in 2016 or 2017. Rawls was loaned to Orange County SC in the USL on March 15, 2018. Rawls made 30 appearances for Orange County, including one in the U.S. Open Cup and three in the USL Cup Playoffs.

Rawls was released by New York City at the end of the 2018 season, but was selected by Colorado Rapids in the 2018 MLS Re-Entry Draft.

On March 6, 2019, Rawls was again loaned to the USL Championship, joining Rapids affiliate Colorado Springs Switchbacks FC. Rawls played 15 matches, posting a 64.6 save percentage and six clean sheets. Rawls signed a two-year contract with the Rapids on Nov. 25, 2019.

Rawls did not appear in 2020, but was on the Rapids bench for Colorado's first two matches of the regular season, as well as Colorado's three matches at the MLS is Back Tournament.

In March 2021, Rawls joined USL Championship club Phoenix Rising FC on loan for the 2021 season.

Following the 2021 season, Colorado declined their contract option on Rawls.
