= List of Major League Soccer transfers 2015 =

The following is a list of transfers for the 2015 Major League Soccer season. Expansion sides New York City FC and Orlando City SC were able to sign players during the 2014 season, beginning on June 2, 2014 with New York City's agreement to bring in former Atlético Madrid striker David Villa as a Designated Player. Both New York City and Orlando City's MLS moves, as well as the rest of the transactions, will be made during the 2014–15 MLS offseason all the way through to the roster freeze on September 1, 2015.

== Transfers ==
Date	Name	Moving from	Moving to	Mode of Transfer
June 2, 2014	(Spain) David Villa	(Spain) Atlético Madrid	New York City FC	Free
June 5, 2014	(Spain) David Villa	New York City FC	(Australia) Melbourne City FC	Loan
June 12, 2014	(United States) Jeb Brovsky	Montreal Impact	New York City FC	Trade
July 1, 2014	(Brazil) Kaká	(Italy) Milan	Orlando City SC	Free
July 1, 2014	(Brazil) Kaká	Orlando City SC	(Brazil) São Paulo	Loan
July 7, 2014	(United States) Jeb Brovsky	New York City FC	(Norway) Strømsgodset	Loan
July 10, 2014	(Puerto Rico) Josh Saunders	Unattached	New York City FC	Free
July 17, 2014	(Puerto Rico) Josh Saunders	New York City FC	(United States) San Antonio Scorpions	Loan
July 24, 2014	(England) Frank Lampard	(England) Chelsea	New York City FC	Free
July 29, 2014	(United States) Andrew Jacobson	FC Dallas	New York City FC	Trade
July 29, 2014	(United States) Andrew Jacobson	New York City FC	(Norway) Stabæk	Loan
August 1, 2014	(United States) Kwame Watson-Siriboe	Real Salt Lake	New York City FC	Trade
August 3, 2014	(England) Frank Lampard	New York City FC	(England) Manchester City	Loan
August 13, 2014	DeAndre Yedlin	Seattle Sounders FC	Tottenham Hotspur	Undisclosed
August 22, 2014	(United States) Kwame Watson-Siriboe	New York City FC	(United States) Carolina RailHawks	Loan
October 7, 2014	(Sierra Leone) Kei Kamara	Unattached	Columbus Crew SC	Free
October 29, 2014	(Sweden) Mohammed Saeid	(Sweden) Örebro SK	Columbus Crew SC	Free
November 19, 2014	(United States) Caleb Calvert	Chivas USA	Colorado Rapids	Dispersal Draft
November 19, 2014	(United States) Marco Delgado	Chivas USA	Toronto FC	Dispersal Draft
November 19, 2014	(United States) Matt Dunn	Chivas USA	New York City FC	Dispersal Draft
November 19, 2014	(United States) Dan Kennedy	Chivas USA	FC Dallas	Dispersal Draft
November 19, 2014	(United States) Thomas McNamara	Chivas USA	D.C. United	Dispersal Draft
November 19, 2014	(United States) Donny Toia	Chivas USA	Montreal Impact	Dispersal Draft
November 19, 2014	(United States) Kris Tyrpak	Chivas USA	San Jose Earthquakes	Dispersal Draft
December 1, 2014	(Italy) Marco Donadel	Unattached	Montreal Impact	Free
December 2, 2014	(Nigeria) Kennedy Igboananike	(Sweden) AIK	Chicago Fire	Undisclosed
December 3, 2014	(Trinidad and Tobago) Joevin Jones	(Trinidad and Tobago) W Connection	Chicago Fire	Undisclosed
December 8, 2014	(Venezuela) Bernardo Añor	Columbus Crew SC	Sporting Kansas City	Trade
December 8, 2014	(Colombia) Dairon Asprilla	(Colombia) Atlético Nacional	Portland Timbers	Undisclosed
December 8, 2014	(United States) Nat Borchers	Real Salt Lake	Portland Timbers	Trade
December 8, 2014	(Netherlands) Geoffrey Castillion	New England Revolution	Colorado Rapids	Trade
December 8, 2014	(France) Aurélien Collin	Sporting Kansas City	Orlando City SC	Trade
December 8, 2014	(England) Andrew Driver	Houston Dynamo	D.C. United	Trade
December 8, 2014	(United States) Tally Hall	Houston Dynamo	Orlando City SC	Trade
December 8, 2014	(United States) Michael Harrington	Portland Timbers	Colorado Rapids	Trade
December 8, 2014	(France) Dimitry Imbongo	New England Revolution	Colorado Rapids	Trade
December 8, 2014	(Ghana) Samuel Inkoom	D.C. United	Houston Dynamo	Trade
December 8, 2014	(Brazil) Jeanderson	(Brazil) Santa Rita	Portland Timbers	Undisclosed
December 8, 2014	(Ghana) Adam Larsen Kwarasey	(Norway) Strømsgodset IF	Portland Timbers	Undisclosed
December 8, 2014	(United States) Joe Nasco	Colorado Rapids	New England Revolution	Trade
December 8, 2014	(United States) Amobi Okugo	Philadelphia Union	Orlando City SC	Trade
December 8, 2014	(Jamaica) Alvas Powell	(Jamaica) Portmore United	Portland Timbers	Undisclosed
December 8, 2014	(United States) Omar Salgado	Vancouver Whitecaps FC	New York City FC	Trade
December 8, 2014	(United States) C. J. Sapong	Sporting Kansas City	Philadelphia Union	Trade
December 8, 2014	(United States) Josh Williams	Columbus Crew SC	New York City FC	Trade
December 8, 2014	(United States) Joe Willis	D.C. United	Houston Dynamo	Trade
December 9, 2014	(United States) Michael Stephens	(Norway) Stabæk	Chicago Fire	Free
December 10, 2014	(United States) Jalil Anibaba	Seattle Sounders FC	Orlando City SC	Expansion Draft
December 10, 2014	(United States) Jalil Anibaba	Orlando City SC	Sporting Kansas City	Trade
December 10, 2014	(Costa Rica) Jairo Arrieta	Columbus Crew SC	Orlando City SC	Expansion Draft
December 10, 2014	(Morocco) Mehdi Ballouchy	Vancouver Whitecaps FC	New York City FC	Expansion Draft
December 10, 2014	(Argentina) Leandro Barrera	Unattached	San Jose Earthquakes	Waiver Draft
December 10, 2014	(United States) Bobby Burling	Unattached	Colorado Rapids	Waiver Draft
December 10, 2014	(United States) Tony Cascio	Colorado Rapids	Orlando City SC	Expansion Draft
December 10, 2014	(United States) Eric Gehrig	Columbus Crew SC	Orlando City SC	Expansion Draft
December 10, 2014	(United States) Eric Gehrig	Orlando City SC	Chicago Fire	Trade
December 10, 2014	(United States) Ned Grabavoy	Real Salt Lake	New York City FC	Expansion Draft
December 10, 2014	(United States) Jason Hernandez	San Jose Earthquakes	New York City FC	Expansion Draft
December 10, 2014	(United States) George John	FC Dallas	New York City FC	Expansion Draft
December 10, 2014	(United States) Daniel Lovitz	Toronto FC	New York City FC	Expansion Draft
December 10, 2014	(United States) Daniel Lovitz	New York City FC	Toronto FC	Trade
December 10, 2014	(United States) Thomas McNamara	D.C. United	New York City FC	Expansion Draft
December 10, 2014	(United States) Patrick Mullins	New England Revolution	New York City FC	Expansion Draft
December 10, 2014	(Democratic Republic of the Congo) Danny Mwanga	Colorado Rapids	Orlando City SC	Expansion Draft
December 10, 2014	(England) Lewis Neal	D.C. United	Orlando City SC	Expansion Draft
December 10, 2014	(Colombia) Jámison Olave	New York Red Bulls	Real Salt Lake	Trade
December 10, 2014	(United States) Heath Pearce	Montreal Impact	Orlando City SC	Expansion Draft
December 10, 2014	(England) Nigel Reo-Coker	Unattached	Montreal Impact	Waiver Draft
December 10, 2014	(Brazil) Pedro Ribeiro	Philadelphia Union	Orlando City SC	Expansion Draft
December 10, 2014	(Jamaica) Donovan Ricketts	Portland Timbers	Orlando City SC	Expansion Draft
December 10, 2014	(United States) Mark Sherrod	Houston Dynamo	Orlando City SC	Expansion Draft
December 10, 2014	(United States) Tony Taylor	New England Revolution	New York City FC	Expansion Draft
December 10, 2014	(United States) Chris Wingert	Real Salt Lake	New York City FC	Expansion Draft
December 10, 2014	(United States) Sal Zizzo	Sporting Kansas City	New York City FC	Expansion Draft
December 11, 2014	(United States) Akira Fitzgerald	(United States) Carolina RailHawks	New York City FC	Free
December 11, 2014	(United States) Ryan Meara	New York Red Bulls	New York City FC	Loan
December 11, 2014	(United States) Mark Sherrod	Orlando City SC	San Jose Earthquakes	Trade
December 11, 2014	(Iceland) Kristinn Steindórsson	(Sweden) Halmstads BK	Columbus Crew SC	Undisclosed
December 11, 2014	(United States) Sal Zizzo	New York City FC	New York Red Bulls	Trade
December 12, 2014	(United States) Robbie Findley	Real Salt Lake	Toronto FC	Re-Entry Draft
December 12, 2014	(United States) Andy Gruenebaum	Sporting Kansas City	San Jose Earthquakes	Re-Entry Draft
December 12, 2014	(United States) Eric Kronberg	Sporting Kansas City	Montreal Impact	Re-Entry Draft
December 15, 2014	(Honduras) Bryan Róchez	(Honduras) Real España	Orlando City SC	Undisclosed
December 16, 2014	(Haiti) James Marcelin	(United States) Fort Lauderdale Strikers	Sporting Kansas City	Free
December 18, 2014	(Ecuador) Juan Luis Anangonó	Chicago Fire	(Mexico) Universidad de Guadalajara	Undisclosed
December 18, 2014	(United States) Tristan Bowen	Seattle Sounders FC	New England Revolution	Re-Entry Draft
December 18, 2014	(United States) Josh Ford	Seattle Sounders FC	Orlando City SC	Re-Entry Draft
December 18, 2014	(United States) Jeremy Hall	Toronto FC	New England Revolution	Trade
December 18, 2014	(Saint Kitts and Nevis) Atiba Harris	San Jose Earthquakes	FC Dallas	Re-Entry Draft
December 18, 2014	(United States) Chandler Hoffman	LA Galaxy	Houston Dynamo	Re-Entry Draft
December 18, 2014	(Chile) Luis Marín	(Chile) O'Higgins	Sporting Kansas City	Undisclosed
December 18, 2014	(Hungary) Krisztián Németh	Unattached	Sporting Kansas City	Free
December 18, 2014	(The Gambia) Sanna Nyassi	Chicago Fire	San Jose Earthquakes	Re-Entry Draft
December 18, 2014	(Mali) Bakary Soumaré	Chicago Fire	Montreal Impact	Re-Entry Draft
December 18, 2014	(United States) Nathan Sturgis	Unattached	Houston Dynamo	Re-Entry Draft
December 18, 2014	(United States) Marvell Wynne	Colorado Rapids	San Jose Earthquakes	Re-Entry Draft
December 19, 2014	(Ghana) David Accam	(Sweden) Helsingborg	Chicago Fire	Undisclosed
December 19, 2014	(United States) Brek Shea	(England) Stoke City	Orlando City SC	Undisclosed
December 19, 2014	(Colombia) Sebastián Velásquez	Real Salt Lake	New York City FC	Trade
December 23, 2014	(Mexico) Erick Torres	(Mexico) Guadalajara	Houston Dynamo	Undisclosed
December 23, 2014	(Mexico) Erick Torres	Houston Dynamo	(Mexico) Guadalajara	Loan
December 25, 2014	(Uruguay) Octavio Rivero	(Chile) O'Higgins	Vancouver Whitecaps FC	Undisclosed
December 29, 2014	(England) Tyrone Mears	Unattached	Seattle Sounders FC	Free
December 30, 2014	(Brazil) Adaílton	(Brazil) Bahia	Chicago Fire	Undisclosed
January 5, 2015	(Brazil) Gustavo	(Brazil) Vila Nova	Orlando City SC	Undisclosed
January 5, 2015	(Ecuador) Andrés Mendoza	(Uruguay) Deportivo Maldonado	New York City FC	Undisclosed
January 6, 2015	(Brazil) Guly do Prado	(England) Southampton	Chicago Fire	Free
January 6, 2015	(Honduras) Roger Espinoza	Unattached	Sporting Kansas City	Free
January 6, 2015	(United States) Cole Grossman	Real Salt Lake	(Norway) Stabæk	Undisclosed
January 6, 2015	(United States) Zac MacMath	Philadelphia Union	Colorado Rapids	Loan
January 6, 2015	(Mexico) Carlos Salcedo	Real Salt Lake	(Mexico) Guadalajara	Undisclosed
January 7, 2015	(England) Steven Gerrard	(England) Liverpool	LA Galaxy	Free
January 8, 2015	(Argentina) Víctor Cabrera	(Argentina) River Plate	Montreal Impact	Loan
January 9, 2015	(Spain) Raúl Rodríguez	(Spain) Espanyol	Houston Dynamo	Free
January 12, 2015	(Finland) Markus Halsti	(Sweden) Malmö FF	D.C. United	Undisclosed
January 13, 2015	(United States) Mix Diskerud	Unattached	New York City FC	Free
January 13, 2015	(United States) Troy Perkins	Unattached	Seattle Sounders FC	Free
January 14, 2015	(Costa Rica) Jairo Arrieta	Orlando City SC	D.C. United	Trade
January 14, 2015	(Uruguay) Diego Rodríguez	(Uruguay) Juventud	Vancouver Whitecaps FC	Loan
January 15, 2015	(United States) Sean Okoli	Seattle Sounders FC	New England Revolution	Trade
January 15, 2015	(Brazil) Marcelo Sarvas	LA Galaxy	Colorado Rapids	Trade
January 16, 2015	(United States) Jozy Altidore	(England) Sunderland	Toronto FC	Allocation
January 16, 2015	(England) Jermain Defoe	Toronto FC	(England) Sunderland	Undisclosed
January 16, 2015	(Brazil) Leo Fernandes	Philadelphia Union	(United States) New York Cosmos	Loan
January 16, 2015	(United States) Chris Klute	Colorado Rapids	Columbus Crew SC	Trade
January 16, 2015	(Brazil) Pecka	(United States) Fort Lauderdale Strikers	Real Salt Lake	Free
January 19, 2015	(United States) Sam Cronin	San Jose Earthquakes	Colorado Rapids	Trade
January 19, 2015	(Italy) Sebastian Giovinco	(Italy) Juventus	Toronto FC	Undisclosed
January 20, 2015	(United States) Kyle Reynish	Chicago Fire	New York Red Bulls	Trade
January 21, 2015	(Canada) Kyle Bekker	Toronto FC	FC Dallas	Trade
January 21, 2015	(Norway) Pa Modou Kah	Unattached	Vancouver Whitecaps FC	Free
January 22, 2015	(Belgium) Laurent Ciman	(Belgium) Standard Liège	Montreal Impact	Undisclosed
January 23, 2015	(Argentina) Hernán Grana	Unattached	Columbus Crew SC	Free
January 23, 2015	(Jamaica) Demar Phillips	Unattached	Real Salt Lake	Free
January 23, 2015	(Ghana) Kwadwo Poku	(United States) Atlanta Silverbacks	New York City FC	Free
January 25, 2015	(Scotland) Shaun Maloney	(England) Wigan Athletic	Chicago Fire	Undisclosed
January 26, 2015	(Colombia) Cristian Higuita	(Colombia) Deportivo Cali	Orlando City SC	Undisclosed
January 26, 2015	(Northern Ireland) Martin Paterson	(England) Huddersfield Town	Orlando City SC	Loan
January 26, 2015	(Poland) Damien Perquis	(Spain) Betis	Toronto FC	Undisclosed
January 26, 2015	(Colombia) Carlos Rivas	(Colombia) Deportivo Cali	Orlando City SC	Undisclosed
January 26, 2015	(United States) Eriq Zavaleta	Seattle Sounders FC	Toronto FC	Trade
January 27, 2015	(United States) Eric Alexander	New York Red Bulls	Montreal Impact	Trade
January 27, 2015	(United States) Jon Busch	Unattached	Chicago Fire	Free
January 27, 2015	(Brazil) Felipe	Montreal Impact	New York Red Bulls	Trade
January 27, 2015	(United States) Andrew Jean-Baptiste	Unattached	New York Red Bulls	Free
January 27, 2015	(Ghana) Dominic Oduro	Toronto FC	Montreal Impact	Trade
January 27, 2015	(Cameroon) Ambroise Oyongo	New York Red Bulls	Montreal Impact	Trade
January 27, 2015	(Guadeloupe) Ronald Zubar	(France) Ajaccio	New York Red Bulls	Undisclosed
January 28, 2015	(United States) Sacha Kljestan	(Belgium) Anderlecht	New York Red Bulls	Allocation
January 29, 2015	(France) Benoît Cheyrou	Unattached	Toronto FC	Free
January 30, 2015	(United States) Juan Agudelo	Unattached	New England Revolution	Free
January 30, 2015	(Democratic Republic of the Congo) Cedrick Mabwati	(Spain) Betis	Columbus Crew SC	Undisclosed
January 31, 2015	(Switzerland) Innocent Emeghara	(Azerbaijan) Qarabağ	San Jose Earthquakes	Undisclosed
January 31, 2015	(Argentina) Lucas Pittinari	(Argentina) Belgrano	Colorado Rapids	Loan
February 2, 2015	(United States) Eric Avila	(Mexico) Santos Laguna	Orlando City SC	Loan
February 2, 2015	(Slovakia) Adam Nemec	Unattached	New York City FC	Free
February 6, 2015	(Colombia) Javier Calle	(Colombia) Independiente Medellín	New York City FC	Loan
February 6, 2015	(Colombia) Carlos Valdés	Philadelphia Union	(Uruguay) Nacional	Loan
February 9, 2015	(Portugal) Steven Vitória	(Portugal) Benfica	Philadelphia Union	Loan
February 10, 2015	(Colombia) Andrés Correa	(Colombia) Independiente Medellín	Seattle Sounders FC	Free
February 10, 2015	(United States) Michael Farfan	Unattached	D.C. United	Allocation
February 13, 2015	(Haiti) Soni Mustivar	(Romania) Petrolul Ploiești	Sporting Kansas City	Free
February 17, 2015	(United States) Mike Grella	(United States) Carolina RailHawks	New York Red Bulls	Free
February 20, 2015	(Argentina) Juan Ramírez	(Argentina) Argentinos Juniors	Colorado Rapids	Undisclosed
February 20, 2015	(Colombia) Michael Barrios	(Colombia) Uniautónoma	FC Dallas	Undisclosed
February 23, 2015	(United States) John McCarthy	(United States) Rochester Rhinos	Philadelphia Union	Free
February 24, 2015	(Honduras) Deybi Flores	(Honduras) Motagua	Vancouver Whitecaps FC	Loan
February 24, 2015	(England) Seb Hines	(England) Middlesbrough	Orlando City SC	Loan
February 24, 2015	(United States) A.J. Soares	New England Revolution	(Norway) Viking	Free
February 24, 2015	(Guatemala) Elías Vásquez	(Mexico) Dorados	Real Salt Lake	Free
February 25, 2015	(United States) Travis Worra	Unattached	D.C. United	Free
February 26, 2015	(Portugal) Paulo Renato	(Portugal) Operário	San Jose Earthquakes	Free
February 28, 2015	(United States) Tyler Rudy	Unattached	New England Revolution	Free
February 28, 2015	(United States) London Woodberry	(United States) Arizona United	New England Revolution	Free
March 2, 2015	(United States) Austin Berry	Philadelphia Union	(South Korea) FC Anyang	Loan
March 2, 2015	(Canada) Marcel de Jong	Unattached	Sporting Kansas City	Free
March 3, 2015	(Cameroon) Eric Ayuk Mbu	Unattached	Philadelphia Union	Free
March 6, 2015	(Spain) Pablo Álvarez	(Spain) Langreo	New York City	Free
March 7, 2015	(Jamaica) Dane Richards	(Norway) Bodø/Glimt	New York Red Bulls	Free
March 17, 2015	(Jamaica) Deshorn Brown	Colorado Rapids	(Norway) Vålerenga	Undisclosed
March 17, 2015	(United States) Danny Cruz	Philadelphia Union	(Norway) Bodø/Glimt	Loan
March 20, 2015	(United States) Patrick Doody	Chicago Fire	(United States) Saint Louis FC	Loan
March 27, 2015	(Spain) Víctor Pérez	(Spain) Real Valladolid	Chicago Fire	Loan
March 30, 2015	(United States) Alec Kann	Chicago Fire	(United States) Saint Louis FC	Loan
March 31, 2015	(Norway) Eirik Johansen	(England) Manchester City	New York City	Undisclosed
April 9, 2015	(United States) Greg Cochrane	Chicago Fire	(United States) Saint Louis FC	Loan
April 9, 2015	(Uruguay) Cristian Techera	(Uruguay) River Plate	Vancouver Whitecaps FC	Loan
April 27, 2015	(United States) Danny Garcia	FC Dallas	(United States) Arizona United	Loan
May 1, 2015	(Argentina) Luis Solignac	(Argentina) Nueva Chicago	Colorado Rapids	Undisclosed
May 9, 2015	(Republic of Ireland) Kevin Doyle	(England) Wolverhampton Wanderers	Colorado Rapids	Free
May 11, 2015	(Norway) Eirik Johansen	New York City	(United States) Wilmington Hammerheads	Loan
May 18, 2015	(Argentina) Facundo Coria	(Spain) Villarreal B	D.C. United	Free
May 26, 2015	(Panama) Rolando Escobar	(Venezuela) Deportivo Anzoátegui	FC Dallas	Undisclosed
May 29, 2015	(United States) Josh Ford	Orlando City SC	(United States) Fort Lauderdale Strikers	Loan
June 16, 2015	(Spain) Andoni Iraola	(Spain) Athletic Bilbao	New York City	Free
June 18, 2015	(England) Otis Earle	FC Dallas	(United States) Arizona United	Loan
June 29, 2015	(Sweden) Erik Friberg	(Denmark) Esbjerg	Seattle Sounders FC	Undisclosed
July 1, 2015	(Spain) Adrián López Rodríguez	Montreal Impact	(Denmark) AGF	Free
July 6, 2015	(Italy) Andrea Pirlo	(Italy) Juventus	New York City	Free
July 8, 2015	(Spain) Angeliño	(England) Manchester City	New York City	Loan
July 9, 2015	(Nigeria) Rasheed Olabiyi	(Nigeria) Enyimba	Houston Dynamo	Undisclosed
July 10, 2015	(Jamaica) Dane Richards	New York Red Bulls	(United States) Indy Eleven	Loan
July 15, 2015	(United States) Corey Ashe	Houston Dynamo	Orlando City SC	Trade
July 15, 2015	(Mexico) Giovani Dos Santos	(Spain) Villarreal	LA Galaxy	$7M
July 16, 2015	(Canada) Kyle Bekker	FC Dallas	Montreal Impact	Trade
July 16, 2015	(Costa Rica) Álvaro Saborío	Real Salt Lake	D.C. United	Trade
July 16, 2015	(United States) Luis Silva	D.C. United	Real Salt Lake	Trade
July 16, 2015	(Mali) Bakary Soumaré	Montreal Impact	FC Dallas	Trade
July 20, 2015	(United States) Servando Carrasco	Sporting Kansas City	Orlando City SC	Trade
July 20, 2015	(United States) Amobi Okugo	Orlando City SC	Sporting Kansas City	Trade
July 22, 2015	(Argentina) Ezequiel Cirigliano	(Argentina) River Plate	FC Dallas	Loan
July 24, 2015	(Morocco) Ahmed Kantari	(France) Lens	Toronto FC	Free
July 27, 2015	(United States) Conor Donovan	Orlando City SC	(United States) Pittsburgh Riverhounds	Loan
July 27, 2015	(Ivory Coast) Didier Drogba	Unattached	Montreal Impact	Free
July 27, 2015	(England) Shaun Wright-Phillips	Unattached	New York Red Bulls	Free
July 29, 2015	(Switzerland) Tranquillo Barnetta	Unattached	Philadelphia Union	Free
July 29, 2015	(Spain) David Mateos	(Hungary) Ferencvárosi	Orlando City SC	Undisclosed
July 29, 2015	(Switzerland) Adrian Winter	(Switzerland) Luzern	Orlando City SC	Undisclosed
July 30, 2015	(Ghana) Harrison Afful	(Tunisia) Espérance Sportive de Tunis	Columbus Crew SC	Undisclosed
July 30, 2015	(United States) Tommy Redding	Orlando City SC	(United States) Wilmington Hammerheads	Loan
July 30, 2015	(Jamaica) Donovan Ricketts	Orlando City SC	LA Galaxy	Trade
July 30, 2015	(United States) Sidney Rivera	Orlando City SC	(United States) Pittsburgh Riverhounds	Loan
July 30, 2015	(Argentina) Gonzalo Verón	(Argentina) San Lorenzo	New York Red Bulls	Undisclosed
August 3, 2015	(Costa Rica) Johan Venegas	(Costa Rica) Alajuelense	Montreal Impact	Undisclosed
August 4, 2015	(Austria) Andreas Ivanschitz	Unattached	Seattle Sounders FC	Free
August 4, 2015	(United States) Jack McInerney	Montreal Impact	Columbus Crew SC	Trade
August 5, 2015	(United States) David Romney	LA Galaxy II	LA Galaxy	Free
August 5, 2015	(Jamaica) Khari Stephenson	San Jose Earthquakes	(United States) San Antonio Scorpions	Loan
August 6, 2015	(United States) Adam Bedell	Columbus Crew SC	Orlando City SC	SuperDraft
August 6, 2015	(Trinidad and Tobago) Daneil Cyrus	(Trinidad and Tobago) W Connection	Chicago Fire	Loan
August 6, 2015	(Argentina) Gastón Sauro	(Switzerland) Basel	Columbus Crew SC	Undisclosed
August 6, 2015	(Jamaica) Michael Seaton	D.C. United	Portland Timbers	Undisclosed
August 6, 2015	(Spain) Jordi Quintillà	(France) Ajaccio	Sporting Kansas City	Free
August 7, 2015	(United States) Warren Creavalle	Toronto	Philadelphia Union	SuperDraft
August 7, 2015	(Honduras) Maynor Figueroa	Unattached	Colorado Rapids	Free
August 7, 2015	(United States) Hérculez Gómez	(Mexico) Tijuana	Toronto	Undisclosed
August 7, 2015	(United States) Erik Hurtado	Vancouver Whitecaps FC	(Norway) Mjøndalen	Loan
August 7, 2015	(United States) Shane O'Neill	Colorado Rapids	(Cyprus) Apollon Limassol	Undisclosed
August 7, 2015	(Costa Rica) Jordan Smith	(Costa Rica) Saprissa	Vancouver Whitecaps FC	Loan
August 7, 2015	(Republic of Ireland) Sean St Ledger	Unattached	Colorado Rapids	Free
August 7, 2015	(Paraguay) Nelson Haedo Valdez	Unattached	Seattle Sounders FC	Free
August 12, 2015	(Panama) Román Torres	Unattached	Seattle Sounders FC	Free
August 13, 2015	(Argentina) Juan Manuel Martínez	Unattached	Real Salt Lake	Free
August 18, 2015	(United States) Christian Lucatero	(United States) Houston Dynamo Academy	Houston Dynamo	Free
August 19, 2015	(United States) Nick Hagglund	Toronto FC	Toronto FC II	Loan
August 19, 2015	(United States) Chris Konopka	Toronto FC	Toronto FC II	Loan
August 27, 2015	(Scotland) Shaun Maloney	Chicago Fire	(England) Hull City	Undisclosed
September 1, 2015	(Slovakia) Adam Nemec	New York City	(Netherlands) Willem II	Free

- ^1 Player officially joined his new club on January 1, 2015.
- ^2 Only rights to player were acquired.
- ^3 Player will officially join his new club on July 1, 2015.
