= List of New York City FC players =

This list comprises all players who have participated in at least one league match for New York City FC since the team's first Major League Soccer season in 2015. Players who were on the roster but never played a first team game are not listed; players who appeared for the team in other competitions (US Open Cup, CONCACAF Champions League, etc.) but never actually made an MLS appearance are noted at the bottom of the page.

A "†" denotes players who only appeared in a single match.

== A ==
- (United States) Saad Abdul-Salaam
- (United States) R. J. Allen
- (Spain) Pablo Álvarez
- (Spain) Eloi Amagat
- (Spain) Angeliño

== B ==
- (Morocco) Mehdi Ballouchy
- (Colombia) Dan Bedoya †
- (Norway) Jo Inge Berget
- (United States) Connor Brandt †
- (Argentina) Federico Bravo
- (France) Frédéric Brillant
- (United States) Jeb Brovsky

== C ==
- (Colombia) Javier Calle
- (Peru) Alexander Callens
- (Panama) Miguel Camargo
- (Argentina) Valentin Castellanos
- (Luxembourg) Maxime Chanot

== D ==
- (United States) Mix Diskerud
- (United States) Matt Dunn †

== F ==
- (England) Shay Facey
- (Argentina) Julián Fernández
- (Argentina) Nicolás Fernández
- (United States) Matt Freese

== G ==
- (United States) Ned Grabavoy
- (Jamaica) Tayvon Gray
- (Brazil) Raul Gustavo

== H ==
- (United States) Justin Haak
- (England) Jack Harrison
- (Brazil) Heber
- (Puerto Rico) Jason Hernandez
- (Venezuela) Yangel Herrera
- (Benin) Cedric Hountondji †

== I ==
- (Nigeria) Sebastien Ibeagha
- (Slovenia) Mitja Ilenič
- (Spain) Andoni Iraola

== J ==
- (United States) Andrew Jacobson
- (Norway) Eirik Johansen †
- (Sierra Leone) Malachi Jones

== L ==
- (England) Frank Lampard
- (United States) Jonathan Lewis (soccer)
- (United States) Mikey Lopez

== M ==
- (Scotland) Gary Mackay-Steven
- (Argentina) Diego Martínez
- (Costa Rica) Alonso Martínez
- (Brazil) Thiago Martins
- (Costa Rica) Rónald Matarrita
- (United States) Thomas McNamara
- (United States) Ryan Meara †
- (Paraguay) Jesus Medina
- (Colombia) Jefferson Mena
- (Colombia) Stiven Mendoza
- (United States) Eric Miller (soccer)
- (Romania) Alexandru Mitrita
- (Argentina) Maximiliano Moralez
- (United States) Patrick Mullins

== N ==
- (Slovakia) Adam Nemec

== O ==
- (Ghana) Ebenezer Ofori
- (Argentina) Agustín Ojeda
- (United States) Sean Okoli
- (Australia) Aiden O'Neill
- (United States) Kevin O'Toole

== P ==
- (United States) Keaton Parks
- (United States) Andrés Perea
- (Italy) Andrea Pirlo
- (Ghana) Kwadwo Poku

== R ==
- (Jamaica) Seymour Reid
- (Finland) Alexander Ring
- (United States) Tony Rocha
- (Uruguay) Santiago Rodriguez

== S ==
- (United States) James Sands
- (Puerto Rico) Josh Saunders
- (United States) Khiry Shelton
- (United States) Jonathan Shore
- (United States) John Stertzer
- (Slovenia) Andraz Struna
- (United States) Ben Sweat

== T ==
- (Serbia) Strahinja Tanasijević
- (Libya) Ismael Tajouri-Shradi
- (Panama) Tony Taylor
- (Sweden) Anton Tinnerholm
- (Iceland) Guđmundur Thórarinsson
- (United States) Juan Pablo Torres (soccer) †

== V ==
- (Colombia) Sebastián Velásquez
- (Spain) David Villa

== W ==
- (Costa Rica) Rodney Wallace (soccer)
- (United States) Kwame Watson-Siriboe
- (United States) Ethan White
- (United States) Josh Williams
- (United States) Chris Wingert
- (Austria) Hannes Wolf

== Z ==
- (United States) Gedion Zelalem

== Miscellaneous ==
- (Trinidad and Tobago) Shannon Gomez made no first team appearances for the club. NYCFC declined his option following the 2017 season. He appeared in one U.S. Open Cup match.

== Sources ==
- MLSSoccer.com | NYCFC | Rosters 2015-2020
- New York City FC Players Category:New York City FC players
