= 2015 New York City FC season =

New York City FC
2015 season
- Chairman: Ferran Soriano
- Manager: Jason Kreis
- Stadium: Yankee Stadium; The Bronx, New York
- Major League Soccer: Conference: 8th Overall: 17th
- MLS Cup Playoffs: Did not qualify
- U.S. Open Cup: Fourth round
- Top goalscorer: David Villa (18)
- Highest home attendance: 48,047 (June 28 vs. New York Red Bulls)
- Lowest home attendance: 20,461 (April 16 vs. Philadelphia Union)
- Average home league attendance: 29,016
- Biggest win: 2 goals: 6 times
- Biggest defeat: 4 goals: LA 5–1 NYC (August 23)
Home colors	Away colors

The 2015 New York City FC season was the club's first season of existence, their first season in the top tier of American soccer, and their first season in Major League Soccer. New York City FC played their home games at Yankee Stadium in the New York City borough of The Bronx.

== Background ==
MLS commissioner Don Garber announced the league's intent to award a second team in the New York area in 2010, with the new team originally aimed to begin operations by 2013. Initially, the league held talks with New York Mets owner Fred Wilpon about a second NY club and with owners of the rebooted New York Cosmos. The Wilpons' interest in MLS reportedly faded following the family's losses in the Madoff investment scandal, while the Cosmos began playing in the second-tier North American Soccer League in 2013.

Garber had previously cultivated an interest in acquiring investment from a major European soccer team to be owners of a future franchise, and in December 2008, he announced a bid for a Miami expansion team led by FC Barcelona that was to begin play in 2010, though the bid eventually fell through (Garber also briefly discussed Barcelona investing in a New York franchise before moving the focus to Miami).

But when Ferran Soriano, Barcelona's vice president at the time of the Miami bid, was appointed Manchester City CEO in August 2012, Garber reached out to him about a New York City team. In December 2012, unnamed sources told the media that Manchester City were close to being announced as the new owners of the 20th team of MLS, and the brand name "New York City Football Club" was trademarked, although the club quickly denied the report. However, Garber announced in March 2013 that he was almost ready to unveil the new expansion team,

New York City Football Club, LLC was registered with the New York State Department on May 7, 2013, and on May 21 the team was officially announced as the 20th Major League Soccer franchise.

The team announced an English-language radio deal with WFAN on October 3, 2013.

== Non-competitive ==
=== Pre-season ===
February 1, 2015 Friendly	Jacksonville Armada FC	1–2	New York City FC	Jacksonville, Florida
	Perea 50'		Shelton 2'; Naglestad 87' (pen.)	Stadium: Patton Park; Attendance: Closed-door
Note: Four 24 minute quarters.

==== Manchester training camp ====
February 10, 2015 Friendly	New York City FC	2–0	St Mirren	Manchester, England
	Villa 34'; Taylor 69'			Stadium: Academy Stadium; Referee: Mark Heywood

N.B. The friendly against St Mirren deemed the club's first ever match according to the club itself.

February 15, 2015 Friendly	New York City FC	0–2	Brøndby	Manchester, England
			Ornskov 26'; Hasani 49'	Stadium: Academy Stadium

==== Carolina Challenge Cup ====
Team	Pld	W	D	L	GF	GA	GD	Pts
Houston Dynamo	3	2	0	1	5	2	3	6
New York City FC	3	1	1	1	5	3	2	4
Charleston Battery	3	1	1	1	2	4	-2	4
Orlando City SC	3	0	2	1	2	5	-2	2

February 21, 2015 Friendly	New York City FC	1–1	Orlando City SC	Charleston, South Carolina
19:30 EST (UTC−05:00)	Shelton 55'	Report	Kaká 30'	Stadium: Blackbaud Stadium

February 25, 2015 Friendly	New York City FC	1–2	Houston Dynamo	Charleston, South Carolina
16:00 EST (UTC−05:00)	Diskerud 80'		Davis 50'; Garcia 69'	Stadium: Blackbaud Stadium

February 28, 2015 Friendly	Charleston Battery	0–3	New York City FC	Charleston, South Carolina
19:30 EST (UTC−05:00)	Boyd (red card) 50'	Report	Grabavoy 26', 37'; Diskerud 63'	Stadium: Blackbaud Stadium

=== Post-season ===
==== Puerto Rico tour ====
December 11, 2015 Friendly	Puerto Rico	1–2	New York City FC	Bayamón, Puerto Rico
20:00 AST (UTC−04:00)	Hurtado 66' (o.g.)	Report	Arrieta 7' (o.g.); Poku 90+1'	Stadium: Juan Ramón Loubriel Stadium

== Competitions ==
=== Major League Soccer ===
==== League tables ====
===== Eastern Conference =====
Pos	Team	Pld	W	L	T	GF	GA	GD	Pts	Qualification
6	Toronto FC	34	15	15	4	58	58	0	49	Qualification for the knockout round
7	Orlando City SC	34	12	14	8	46	56	−10	44	
8	New York City FC	34	10	17	7	49	58	−9	37	
9	Philadelphia Union	34	10	17	7	42	55	−13	37	
10	Chicago Fire	34	8	20	6	43	58	−15	30	

Source: MLS

===== Overall =====
Pos	Team	Pld	W	L	T	GF	GA	GD	Pts
15	Houston Dynamo	34	11	14	9	42	49	−7	42
16	Real Salt Lake	34	11	15	8	38	48	−10	41
17	New York City FC	34	10	17	7	49	58	−9	37
18	Philadelphia Union	34	10	17	7	42	55	−13	37
19	Colorado Rapids	34	9	15	10	33	43	−10	37

Source: MLS
Rules for classification: 1) points; 2) total wins; 3) total goal differential; 4) total goals scored

==== Results summary ====
Overall								Home						Away					
Pld	W	D	L	GF	GA	GD	Pts	W	D	L	GF	GA	GD	W	D	L	GF	GA	GD
34	10	7	17	49	58	−9	37	6	4	7	32	31	+1	4	3	10	17	27	−10

Last updated: October 2, 2015.
Source: MLS

==== Results by matchday ====
Matchday	1	2	3	4	5	6	7	8	9	10	11	12	13	14	15	16	17	18	19	20	21	22	23	24	25	26	27	28	29	30	31	32	33	34
Stadium	A	H	A	H	A	H	H	A	H	A	H	A	H	A	H	A	H	A	H	A	H	H	A	H	A	A	H	A	H	H	A	A	A	H
Result	D	W	D	L	L	D	L	L	L	L	D	L	D	W	W	W	L	W	D	L	W	L	L	W	D	L	L	L	W	W	W	L	L	L

Updated to match(es) played on October 25, 2015. Source: MLS
A = Away; H = Home; W = Win; D = Draw; L = Loss

==== Matches ====
March 8, 2015 1	Orlando City SC	1–1	New York City FC	Orlando, Florida
17:00 EDT (UTC−04:00)	Collin (red card) 83'; Kaká 90+1'	Report	Diskerud 76'	Stadium: Citrus Bowl; Attendance: 62,510; Referee: Alan Kelly

March 15, 2015 2	New York City FC	2–0	New England Revolution	New York City
	Wingert (yellow card) 6'; Villa 19'; Williams (yellow card) 57'; Mullins 84'	Report	Rowe (yellow card) 11'; Gonçalves (red card) 66'; Dorman (yellow card) 73'	Stadium: Yankee Stadium; Attendance: 43,507

March 21, 2015 3	Colorado Rapids	0–0	New York City FC	Commerce City, Colorado
16:00 EDT (UTC−04:00)	Badji (yellow card) 49'	Report	Facey (yellow card) 51' (yellow-red card) 82'; Saunders (yellow card) 90'; Wingert (yellow card) 90+3'	Stadium: Dick's Sporting Goods Park; Attendance: 17,692; Referee: Sorin Stoica

March 28, 2015 4	New York City FC	0–1	Sporting Kansas City	New York City
19:00 EDT (UTC−04:00)	Diskerud (yellow card) 73'; Watson-Siriboe (yellow card) 86'	Report	Opara 12'; Nagamura (yellow card) 68'	Stadium: Yankee Stadium; Attendance: 27,454; Referee: Edvin Jurisevic

April 11, 2015 5	Philadelphia Union	2–1	New York City FC	Chester, Pennsylvania
4:00 p.m. EDT	Pfeffer 27'; Lahoud (yellow card) 81'; Nogueira 90+2'	Report	Villa 55'; Watson-Siriboe (yellow card) 85'	Stadium: PPL Park; Attendance: 18,603; Referee: Jair Marrufo

April 16, 2015 6	New York City FC	1–1	Philadelphia Union	New York City
7:00 p.m. EDT	Grabavoy (yellow card) 25'; Calle (yellow card) 32'; Ballouchy 57', (yellow card) 58'; Watson-Siriboe (yellow card) 73'; Jacobson (yellow card) 87'	Report	Nogueira (yellow card) 22'; Williams (yellow card) 41'; Sapong (yellow card) 67', (goal) 86'	Stadium: Yankee Stadium; Attendance: 20,461; Referee: Baldomero Toledo

April 19, 2015 7	New York City FC	0–1	Portland Timbers	New York City
19:00 EDT (UTC−04:00)		Report	Powell (yellow card) 68'; Asprilla 79'	Stadium: Yankee Stadium; Attendance: 21,891; Referee: Armando Villarreal

April 24, 2015 8	Chicago Fire	1–0	New York City FC	Bridgeview, Illinois
20:00 EDT (UTC−04:00)	Accam 20'	Report	Jacobson (red card) 24'	Stadium: Toyota Park; Attendance: 19,124; Referee: Ricardo Salazar

May 3, 2015 9	New York City FC	1–3	Seattle Sounders FC	New York City
19:00 EDT (UTC−04:00)	Watson-Siriboe (yellow card) 28' (yellow-red card) 88'; Diskerud (yellow card) 50'; Ballouchy 54'; Poku (yellow card) 85'	Report	Martins 23', 66', (yellow card) 79'; Pappa (yellow card) 39'; Mears (yellow card) 44'; Dempsey 58'	Stadium: Yankee Stadium; Attendance: 25,384; Referee: Silviu Petrescu

May 10, 2015 10	New York Red Bulls	2–1	New York City FC	Harrison, New Jersey
19:00 EDT (UTC−04:00)	Wright-Phillips 4', 52'; Miazga (yellow card) 18' (yellow-red card) 36'; Kljestan (yellow card) 90'	BBC Report; MLS Report	Mullins 76'; Allen (yellow card) 82'; Poku (yellow card) 87'; Ballouchy (yellow card) 88'	Stadium: Red Bull Arena; Attendance: 25,217; Referee: Alan Kelly

May 15, 2015 11	New York City FC	2–2	Chicago Fire	New York City
19:00 EDT (UTC−04:00)	Allen (red card) 26'; Ballouchy 45+1'; Villa (yellow card) 45+3'; Facey (yellow card) 51'; Jacobson (yellow card) 71'; Shelton 90+1'		Cociș 14'; Larentowicz 27' (pen.), (yellow card) 55'; Jones (yellow card) 61'; Maloney (yellow card) 63'	Stadium: Yankee Stadium; Attendance: 23,315; Referee: Ted Unkel

May 23, 2015 12	Real Salt Lake	2–0	New York City FC	Sandy, Utah
22:00 EDT (UTC−04:00)	Stertzer 25'; Phillips (yellow card) 40'; Saborío 49'	Report		Stadium: Rio Tinto Stadium; Attendance: 20,801; Referee: Juan Guzman

May 30, 2015 13	New York City FC	1–1	Houston Dynamo	New York City
19:00 EDT (UTC−04:00)	Wingert (yellow card) 32'; Villa 45+1' (pen.); Hernandez (yellow card) 79'	Report	Bruin 16'; Clark (yellow card) 35'; Garrido (yellow card) 54'; Rodríguez (yellow card) 90+4'	Stadium: Yankee Stadium; Attendance: 26,211; Referee: Sorin Stoica

June 6, 2015 14	Philadelphia Union	1–2	New York City FC	Chester, Pennsylvania
19:00 EDT (UTC−04:00)	Sapong 46'; Edu (yellow card) 89'	Report	Hernandez (yellow card) 4'; McNamara 53'; Mullins 87'	Stadium: PPL Park; Attendance: 18,517; Referee: Drew Fischer

June 13, 2015 15	New York City FC	3–1	Montreal Impact	New York City
19:00 EDT (UTC−04:00)	Villa 31'; Allen (yellow card) 52'; Diskerud 76'; Poku 90'	Report	Lefevre 88'	Stadium: Yankee Stadium; Attendance: 24,042; Referee: Jair Marrufo

June 20, 2015 16	Toronto FC	0–2	New York City FC	Toronto, Ontario, Canada
19:00 EDT (UTC−04:00)		Report	Villa 8' (pen.), 58'	Stadium: BMO Field; Attendance: 30,029

June 28, 2015 17	New York City FC	1–3	New York Red Bulls	New York City
17:00 EDT (UTC−04:00)	McNamara 6'; Villa (yellow card) 41'	Report	Duvall (yellow card) 34', (goal) 52'; Robles (yellow card) 41'; Wright-Phillips 47'; Perrinelle (yellow card) 54'; Miazga 73'	Stadium: Yankee Stadium; Attendance: 48,047

July 4, 2015 18	Montreal Impact	1–2	New York City FC	Montreal
20:00 EDT (UTC−04:00)	Ciman (yellow card) 69'; Piatti 77' (pen.); Romero (yellow card) 90+3'	Report	Villa 34', 82'; Poku (yellow card) 45+1'; Mullins (yellow card) 53'; Allen (yellow card) 61'	Stadium: Saputo Stadium; Attendance: 18,112; Referee: Jorge Gonzalez

July 12, 2015 19	New York City FC	4–4	Toronto FC	New York City
17:00 EDT (UTC−04:00)	Villa 17', 65' (pen.); Perquis 29' (o.g.); Iraola (yellow card) 60'; Ballouchy (yellow card) 66'; Mullins 84'	Report	Hagglund (yellow card) 25'; Giovinco 34' (pen.), 40', 43'; Warner (yellow card) 62'; Delgado 82'; Morrow (yellow card) 90+3'	Stadium: Yankee Stadium; Attendance: 27,533; Referee: Ted Unkel

July 18, 2015 20	New England Revolution	1–0	New York City FC	Foxborough, Massachusetts
19:30 EDT (UTC−04:00)	Nguyen 12' (yellow card) 29'; Caldwell (yellow card) 42'; Hall (yellow card) 90+2'	Report	Hernandez (yellow card) 48'; Grabavoy (red card) 55'; Jacobson (yellow card) 68'	Stadium: Gillette Stadium; Attendance: 28,811; Referee: Sorin Stoica

July 26, 2015 21	New York City FC	5–3	Orlando City SC	New York City
14:30 EDT (UTC−04:00)	Villa 45', 67'; Calle 53'; McNamara 71'; Diskerud 90+3'	Report	Larin 50', 61', 85'	Stadium: Yankee Stadium; Attendance: 32,041; Referee: Alan Kelly

August 1, 2015 22	New York City FC	2–3	Montreal Impact	New York City
15:00 EDT (UTC−04:00)	Calle (yellow card) 22'; Mena (yellow card) 43'; Hernandez (yellow card) 53'; Villa 68' (pen.); McNamara 85'	Report	Oduro 5'; Piatti 32', 84' (pen.); Donadel (yellow card) 45+1'; Romero (yellow card) 75'	Stadium: Yankee Stadium; Attendance: 27,645; Referee: Jose Carlos Rivero

August 9, 2015 23	New York Red Bulls	2–0	New York City FC	Harrison, New Jersey
19:00 EDT (UTC−04:00)	Wright-Phillips 21'; Felipe 85'; Lade (yellow card) 90+2'	Report	McNamara (yellow card) 45'; Facey (yellow card) 59'; Mullins (yellow card) 90+2'	Stadium: Red Bull Arena; Attendance: 25,219; Referee: Ismail Elfath

August 13, 2015 24	New York City FC	3–1	D.C. United	New York City
20:00 EDT (UTC−04:00)	Facey (yellow card) 31'; McNamara 51' (yellow card) 75'; Villa 80' (yellow card) 80'; Poku 88'	Report	Saborío 36'	Stadium: Yankee Stadium; Attendance: 28,262; Referee: Jorge González

August 19, 2015 25	Columbus Crew SC	2–2	New York City FC	Columbus, Ohio
19:30 EDT (UTC−04:00)	Kamara 24'; Cedrick 72'	Report	Villa (yellow card) 51'; Poku 54', 66'; Saunders (yellow card) 90+3'; Iraola (yellow card) 90+4'	Stadium: Columbus Crew Stadium; Attendance: 15,514; Referee: Allen Chapman

August 23, 2015 26	LA Galaxy	5–1	New York City FC	Carson, California
15:00 EDT (UTC−04:00)	Zardes 36'; Keane 54', 81' dos Santos 67'; Lletget 70'	Report	Villa 80' (pen.); Grabavoy (yellow card) 83'	Stadium: StubHub Center; Attendance: 27,000; Referee: Baldomero Toledo

August 29, 2015 27	New York City FC	1–2	Columbus Crew SC	New York City
16:00 EDT (UTC−04:00)	Jacobson 29'	Report	Higuain 10'; Tchani (yellow card) 69'; Kamara (yellow card) 82'; Meram 83'	Stadium: Yankee Stadium; Attendance: 30,018; Referee: Juan Guzman

September 12, 2015 28	FC Dallas	2–1	New York City FC	Frisco, Texas
20:30 EDT (UTC−04:00)	Harris (yellow card) 30'; Akindele 45'; Michel 45+4', (yellow card) 64'	Report	Wingert (yellow card) 62'; Mullins 70'	Stadium: Toyota Stadium; Attendance: 16,937; Referee: Alan Kelly

September 16, 2015 29	New York City FC	2–0	Toronto FC	New York City
19:30 EDT (UTC−04:00)	Lampard 20'; Hernandez (yellow card) 62'; Mullins 77'; Saunders (yellow card) 88'		Cheyrou (yellow card) 52'; Perquis (yellow card) 90+3'	Stadium: Yankee Stadium; Attendance: 25,075; Referee: Chris Penso

September 19, 2015 30	New York City FC	3–2	San Jose Earthquakes	New York City
19:00 EDT (UTC−04:00)	Pirlo (yellow card) 33'; Allen (yellow card) 44'; Grabavoy 51', 63'; Villa 65'; Wingert (yellow card) 66'; Jacobson (yellow card) 86'	Report	Goodson (yellow card) 34'; Pelosi (yellow card) 45+1'; Amarikwa 72'; Wondolowski 76' (pen.)	Stadium: Yankee Stadium; Attendance: 28,231; Referee: Edvin Jurisevic

September 26, 2015 31	Vancouver Whitecaps FC	1–2	New York City FC	Vancouver, British Columbia
22:00 EDT (UTC−04:00)	Morales (yellow card) 82'; Techera (yellow card) 83'; Morales 88' (pen.)	Report	Facey (yellow card) 12'; Lampard 29'; Villa 90+5' (pen.)	Stadium: BC Place; Attendance: 21,000; Referee: Ricardo Salazar

October 2, 2015 32	D.C. United	2–1	New York City FC	Washington, D.C.
19:00 EDT (UTC−04:00)	Franklin (yellow card) 66'; Espindola 73'; Boswell (yellow card) 87'; Saborio 90+2'	Report	Lampard 1'; Wingert (yellow card) 31'; Mena (yellow card) 54'; Allen (yellow card) 81'; Hernandez (yellow card) 90+1'	Stadium: RFK Stadium; Attendance: 21,517; Referee: Silviu Petrescu

October 16, 2015 33	Orlando City SC	2–1	New York City FC	Orlando, Florida
19:00 EDT (UTC−04:00)	Higuita (yellow card) 36'; Larin 62', 70'; Rivas (yellow card) 68'	Report	Watson-Siriboe 45+2'	Stadium: Citrus Bowl; Attendance: 43,179; Referee: Allen Chapman

October 25, 2015 34	New York City FC	1–3	New England Revolution	New York City
17:00 EDT (UTC−04:00)	Watson-Siriboe (yellow card) 77'; McNamara (yellow card) 86'; Villa 90+1' (pen.)	Report	Nguyen 5'; Davies 38'; Rowe 55'; Fagundez (yellow card) 88'	Stadium: Yankee Stadium; Attendance: 34,150; Referee: Jair Marrufo

=== U.S. Open Cup ===
New York City FC entered the 2015 U.S. Open Cup with all other Major League Soccer teams in the fourth round.

June 16, 2015 4R	New York Cosmos	2–2 (a.e.t.) (4–3 p)	New York City FC	Hempstead, New York
7:30 PM EDT	Gorskie (yellow card) 40'; Fernandes 65'; Szetela (yellow card) 80'; Mkosana 90'; Chirishian (yellow card) 90+1'; Ayoze (yellow card) 117'; Freeman (yellow card) 118'	NYCFC Report; MLS Box Score; NASL Report	Poku 24', 57'; Ballouchy (yellow card) 59'; Wingert (yellow card) 86'; Grabavoy (yellow card) 115'	Stadium: James M. Shuart Stadium; Attendance: 11,446; Referee: Matt Kreitzer
	Penalties
	(penalty scored) Stokkelien; (penalty missed) Freeman; (penalty missed) Fernandes; (penalty scored) Mkosana; (penalty scored) Moffat; (penalty scored) Gorskie		(penalty scored) Wingert; (penalty missed) Grabavoy; (penalty scored) Ballouchy; (penalty scored) Diskerud; (penalty missed) Mullins; (penalty missed) Facey

== Squad information ==
As of October 5, 2015

Squad No.	Name	Nationality	Position(s)	Since	Date of birth (age)	Signed from	Games played	Goals scored
Goalkeepers
12	Josh Saunders	(Puerto Rico)	GK	2014	March 2, 1981 (aged 34)	(United States) Real Salt Lake	33	0
18	Ryan Meara	(United States)	GK	2014	November 15, 1990 (aged 24)	(United States) New York Red Bulls	1	0
25	Eirik Johansen	(Norway)	GK	2015	July 12, 1992 (aged 23)	(England) Manchester City	1	0
Defenders
2	Jason Hernandez	(United States)	CB	2014	August 23, 1983 (aged 32)	(United States) San Jose Earthquakes	27	0
3	Kwame Watson-Siriboe	(United States)	RB / CB	2014	November 13, 1986 (aged 28)	(United States) Real Salt Lake	12	1
5	Jeb Brovsky	(United States)	RB	2014	December 3, 1988 (aged 26)	(Canada) Montreal Impact	16	0
17	Chris Wingert	(United States)	LB	2014	June 16, 1982 (aged 33)	(United States) Real Salt Lake	28	0
24	Shay Facey	(England)	CB / RB	2015	January 7, 1995 (aged 20)	(England) Manchester City	24	0
69	Angeliño	(Spain)	LB	2015	January 4, 1997 (aged 18)	(England) Manchester City	14	0
51	Andoni Iraola	(Spain)	RB	2015	June 22, 1982 (aged 33)	(Spain) Athletic Bilbao	9	0
27	R. J. Allen	(United States)	RB	2015	April 17, 1990 (aged 25)	(Denmark) Skive	15	0
Midfielders
4	Andrew Jacobson	(United States)	AM	2014	September 25, 1989 (aged 26)	(Norway) Stabæk	34	1
8	Frank Lampard	(England)	CM	2015	June 20, 1978 (aged 37)	(England) Manchester City	10	3
10	Mix Diskerud	(United States)	CM	2015	October 2, 1990 (aged 25)	(Norway) Rosenborg	28	3
11	Ned Grabavoy	(United States)	LM	2014	July 1, 1983 (aged 32)	(United States) Real Salt Lake	27	2
21	Andrea Pirlo	(Italy)	CM	2015	May 19, 1979 (aged 36)	(Italy) Juventus	13	0
15	Tommy McNamara	(United States)	AM	2014	February 6, 1991 (aged 24)	(United States) Chivas USA	19	5
16	Connor Brandt	(United States)	CM	2015	September 15, 1992 (aged 23)	(United States) Tucson	1	0
20	Mehdi Ballouchy	(Morocco)	LM	2014	April 6, 1983 (aged 32)	(Canada) Vancouver Whitecaps FC	20	3
26	Sebastián Velásquez	(Colombia)	AM	2014	February 11, 1991 (aged 24)	(United States) Real Salt Lake	12	0
30	Javier Calle	(Colombia)	CM	2015	April 29, 1991 (aged 24)	(Colombia) Independiente Medellín	12	1
88	Kwadwo Poku	(Ghana)	AM	2015	February 19, 1992 (aged 23)	(United States) Atlanta Silverbacks	28	6
Strikers
7	David Villa (captain)	(Spain)	CF	2014	December 3, 1981 (aged 33)	(Spain) Atlético Madrid	30	18
14	Patrick Mullins	(United States)	CF	2014	February 5, 1992 (aged 23)	(United States) New England Revolution	25	6
19	Khiry Shelton	(United States)	CF	2015	June 26, 1993 (aged 22)	(United States) Lane United	17	1
99	Tony Taylor	(United States)	CF	2014	July 13, 1989 (aged 26)	(Cyprus) Omonia	2	0

== Statistics ==
=== Appearances and goals ===
No.	Pos	Nat	Player	Total		MLS		MLS Cup Playoffs		U.S. Open Cup	
No.	Pos	Nat	Player	Apps	Goals	Apps	Goals	Apps	Goals	Apps	Goals
2	DF	(United States) USA	Jason Hernandez	27	0	26+0	0	0+0	0	1+0	0
3	DF	(United States) USA	Kwame Watson-Siriboe	15	1	10+4	1	0+0	0	0+1	0
4	MF	(United States) USA	Andrew Jacobson	34	1	33+0	1	0+0	0	1+0	0
5	DF	(United States) USA	Jeb Brovsky	16	0	12+3	0	0+0	0	1+0	0
6	DF	(United States) USA	George John	0	0	0+0	0	0+0	0	0+0	0
7	FW	(Spain) ESP	David Villa	30	18	29+1	18	0+0	0	0+0	0
8	MF	(England) ENG	Frank Lampard	10	3	9+1	3	0+0	0	0+0	0
10	MF	(United States) USA	Mix Diskerud	28	3	23+4	3	0+0	0	1+0	0
11	MF	(United States) USA	Ned Grabavoy	27	2	22+4	2	0+0	0	0+1	0
12	GK	(Puerto Rico) PUR	Josh Saunders	33	0	33+0	0	0+0	0	0+0	0
14	FW	(United States) USA	Patrick Mullins	25	6	11+13	6	0+0	0	1+0	0
15	MF	(United States) USA	Tommy McNamara	19	3	15+4	3	0+0	0	0+0	0
16	MF	(United States) USA	Connor Brandt	1	0	0+1	0	0+0	0	0+0	0
17	DF	(United States) USA	Chris Wingert	28	0	26+1	0	0+0	0	0+1	0
18	GK	(United States) USA	Ryan Meara	1	0	1+0	0	0+0	0	0+0	0
19	FW	(United States) USA	Khiry Shelton	17	1	7+10	1	0+0	0	0+0	0
20	MF	(Morocco) MAR	Mehdi Ballouchy	20	3	16+3	3	0+0	0	1+0	0
21	MF	(Italy) ITA	Andrea Pirlo	13	0	12+1	0	0+0	0	0+0	0
22	MF	(Spain) ESP	Pablo Álvarez	9	0	3+5	0	0+0	0	1+0	0
23	DF	(Colombia) COL	Jefferson Mena	7	0	6+1	0	0+0	0	0+0	0
24	DF	(England) ENG	Shay Facey	24	0	20+3	0	0+0	0	1+0	0
25	GK	(Norway) NOR	Eirik Johansen	1	0	0+0	0	0+0	0	1+0	0
26	MF	(Colombia) COL	Sebastián Velásquez	12	0	5+7	0	0+0	0	0+0	0
27	DF	(United States) USA	R. J. Allen	15	0	13+1	0	0+0	0	1+0	0
30	MF	(Colombia) COL	Javier Calle	12	1	7+5	1	0+0	0	0+0	0
51	DF	(Spain) ESP	Andoni Iraola	9	0	8+1	0	0+0	0	0+0	0
69	DF	(Spain) ESP	Angeliño	14	0	10+4	0	0+0	0	0+0	0
88	MF	(Ghana) GHA	Kwadwo Poku	28	6	6+21	4	0+0	0	1+0	2
99	FW	(United States) USA	Tony Taylor	2	0	1+1	0	0+0	0	0+0	0
Released	MF	(United States) USA	Matt Dunn	1	0	0+1	0	0+0	0	0+0	0
Released	DF	(United States) USA	Josh Williams	5	0	5+0	0	0+0	0	0+0	0
Released	FW	(Slovakia) SVK	Adam Nemec	9	0	8+1	0	0+0	0	0+0	0

== Honors ==
=== Major League Soccer Player of the Week award ===
Week	Player
2	(Spain) David Villa
15	(Spain) David Villa

=== Major League Soccer Team of the Week selection ===
Week	Player
1	(United States) Mix Diskerud
2	(Spain) David Villa
14	(United States) Tommy McNamara
15	(United States) Jason Hernandez (Spain) David Villa
16	(United States) R. J. Allen (Spain) David Villa
18	(Puerto Rico) Josh Saunders (Spain) David Villa
19	(Spain) David Villa
21	(Ghana) Kwadwo Poku (Spain) David Villa
24	(Ghana) Kwadwo Poku
29	(United States) Ned Grabavoy

=== Major League Soccer Goal of the Week award ===
Week	Player
14	(United States) Tommy McNamara

=== Etihad Airways Player of the Month award ===
Awarded to the player who receives the most votes in a poll conducted each month on the NYCFC website

Month	Player
March	(Puerto Rico) Josh Saunders
April	(Puerto Rico) Josh Saunders
May	(Morocco) Mehdi Ballouchy
June	(United States) Tommy McNamara
July	(Spain) David Villa
August	(Ghana) Kwadwo Poku
September	(England) Frank Lampard
October	(Puerto Rico) Josh Saunders

== Transfers ==
=== In ===
No.	Pos.	Nat.	Name	Age	US	Moving from	Type	Transfer window	Ends	Transfer fee	Source
7	FW	(Spain)	David Villa	32	Non-US	(Spain) Atlético Madrid	Transfer	Summer 2014	2017	Undisclosed	NYCFC.com
5	DF	(United States)	Jeb Brovsky	25	US	(Canada) Montreal Impact	Trade	Summer 2014	2017	2016 SuperDraft 2nd Round pick	MLSsoccer.com
12	GK	(Puerto Rico)	Josh Saunders	33	US	(United States) Real Salt Lake	Free	Summer 2014	2017	Free	NYCFC.com
4	MF	(United States)	Andrew Jacobson	28	US	(United States) FC Dallas	Trade	Summer 2014	2016	2016 SuperDraft 3rd Round pick	NYCFC.com
3	DF	(United States)	Kwame Watson-Siriboe	27	US	(United States) Real Salt Lake	Trade	Summer 2014	2016	2016 SuperDraft 4th Round pick	NYCFC.com
23	MF	(United States)	Matt Dunn	20	US	(United States) Chivas USA	Draft	Winter		Chivas USA Dispersal Draft	NYCFC.com
13	DF	(United States)	Josh Williams	26	US	(United States) Columbus Crew	Trade	Winter		Allocation funds	NYCFC.com
	DF	(United States)	Omar Salgado	21	US	(Canada) Vancouver Whitecaps FC	Trade	Winter		Undisclosed	NYCFC.com
11	MF	(United States)	Ned Grabavoy	31	US	(United States) Real Salt Lake	Draft	Winter		Expansion Draft	NYCFC.com
14	FW	(United States)	Patrick Mullins	22	US	(United States) New England Revolution	Draft	Winter		Expansion Draft	NYCFC.com
21	DF	(United States)	Jason Hernandez	31	US	(United States) San Jose Earthquakes	Draft	Winter		Expansion Draft	NYCFC.com
	MF	(United States)	Daniel Lovitz	23	US	(Canada) Toronto FC	Draft	Winter		Expansion Draft	NYCFC.com
99	FW	(United States)	Tony Taylor	25	US	(United States) New England Revolution	Draft	Winter		Expansion Draft	NYCFC.com
20	MF	(Morocco)	Mehdi Ballouchy	31	US	(Canada) Vancouver Whitecaps FC	Draft	Winter		Expansion Draft	NYCFC.com
6	DF	(United States)	George John	27	US	(United States) FC Dallas	Draft	Winter		Expansion Draft	NYCFC.com
15	MF	(United States)	Tommy McNamara	23	US	(United States) D.C. United	Draft	Winter		Expansion Draft	NYCFC.com
	MF	(United States)	Sal Zizzo	27	US	(United States) Sporting Kansas City	Draft	Winter		Expansion Draft	NYCFC.com
17	DF	(United States)	Chris Wingert	32	US	(United States) Real Salt Lake	Draft	Winter		Expansion Draft	NYCFC.com
1	GK	(United States)	Akira Fitzgerald	27	US		Free	Winter		Free	NYCFC.com
26	MF	(Colombia)	Sebastián Velásquez	23	Non-US	(United States) Real Salt Lake	Trade	Winter		Allocation money	NYCFC.com
2	DF	(Ecuador)	Andrés Mendoza	25	Non-US	(Uruguay) CD Maldonado	Transfer	Winter		Undisclosed	NYCFC.com
10	MF	(United States)	Mix Diskerud	24	US	(Norway) Rosenborg	Free	Winter		Free	NYCFC.com
19	FW	(United States)	Khiry Shelton	21	US		Draft	Winter		SuperDraft	NYCFC.com
16	MF	(United States)	Connor Brandt	22	US		Draft	Winter		SuperDraft	skyscraperblues.com
	GK	(United States)	Andre Rawls	23	US		Draft	Winter		SuperDraft	MLSSoccer.com
88	FW	(Ghana)	Kwadwo Poku	22	US		Transfer	Winter		Undisc.	NYCFC.com
32	FW	(Slovakia)	Adam Nemec	29	Non-US	(Germany) Union Berlin	Transfer	Winter		Free	NYCFC.com
22	MF	(Spain)	Pablo Álvarez	34	Non-US	(Spain) Langreo	Transfer	Winter		Free	NYCFC.com
8	MF	(England)	Frank Lampard	36	Non-US	(England) Manchester City	Free	Summer	2017	Free	BBC Sport
51	DF	(Spain)	Andoni Iraola	33	Non-US	(Spain) Athletic Bilbao	Transfer	Summer		Free	MLSsoccer
21	MF	(Italy)	Andrea Pirlo	36	Non-US	(Italy) Juventus	Transfer	Summer		Free	NYCFC.com

=== Out ===
No.	Pos.	Nat.	Name	Age	US	Moving to	Type	Transfer window	Transfer fee	Source
	MF	(United States)	Daniel Lovitz	23	US	(Canada) Toronto FC	Trade	Winter	Allocation money	NYCFC.com
	MF	(United States)	Sal Zizzo	27	US	(United States) New York Red Bulls	Trade	Winter	Ryan Meara p/x	NYCFC.com
	DF	(United States)	Omar Salgado	21	US	(Mexico) Tigres	Transfer	Winter	Undisclosed	MLSSoccer.com
32	FW	(Slovakia)	Adam Nemec	29	Non-US	(Netherlands) Willem II	Transfer	Summer	Free	sbisoccer.com
13	DF	(United States)	Josh Williams	26	US		Release			
23	MF	(United States)	Matt Dunn	20	US		Release			
1	GK	(United States)	Akira Fitzgerald	27	US		Release			
2	DF	(Ecuador)	Andrés Mendoza	25	Non-US		Release			

=== Loan in ===
No.	Pos.	Player	Loaned From	Start	End	Source
18	GK	(United States) Ryan Meara	(United States) New York Red Bulls	December 11, 2014	December 2015	NYCFC.com
30	MF	(Colombia) Javier Calle	(Colombia) Independiente Medellín	February 6, 2015	December 2015	NYCFC.com
24	DF	(England) Shay Facey	(England) Manchester City	March 6, 2015	January 1, 2016	NYCFC.com
69	DF	(Spain) Angeliño	(England) Manchester City	July 8, 2015	January 1, 2016	MLSsoccer.com

=== Loan out ===
No.	Pos.	Player	Loaned To	Start	End	Source
7	FW	(Spain) David Villa	(Australia) Melbourne City	June 3, 2014	December 31, 2014	BBC.co.uk
5	DF	(United States) Jeb Brovsky	(Norway) Strømsgodset	June 13, 2014	December 31, 2014	EmpireOfSoccer.com
12	GK	(Puerto Rico) Josh Saunders	(United States) San Antonio Scorpions	July 18, 2014	December 31, 2014	NYCFC.com
4	MF	(United States) Andrew Jacobson	(Norway) Stabæk IF	July 29, 2014	December 31, 2014	NYCFC.com
3	DF	(United States) Kwame Watson-Siriboe	(United States) Carolina RailHawks	August 22, 2014	December 31, 2014	CarolinaRailhawks.com

=== Non-player transfers ===
Acquired	From	For	Source
Additional international roster slot – 2015 & 2016	(United States) D.C. United	Allocation money	MLSsoccer.com
Discovery rights for Kwadwo Poku	(United States) Seattle Sounders FC	Conditional 2017 MLS SuperDraft pick	NYCFC.com
