= First Hudson River Derby =

Soccer game in Harrison, New Jersey at 2015

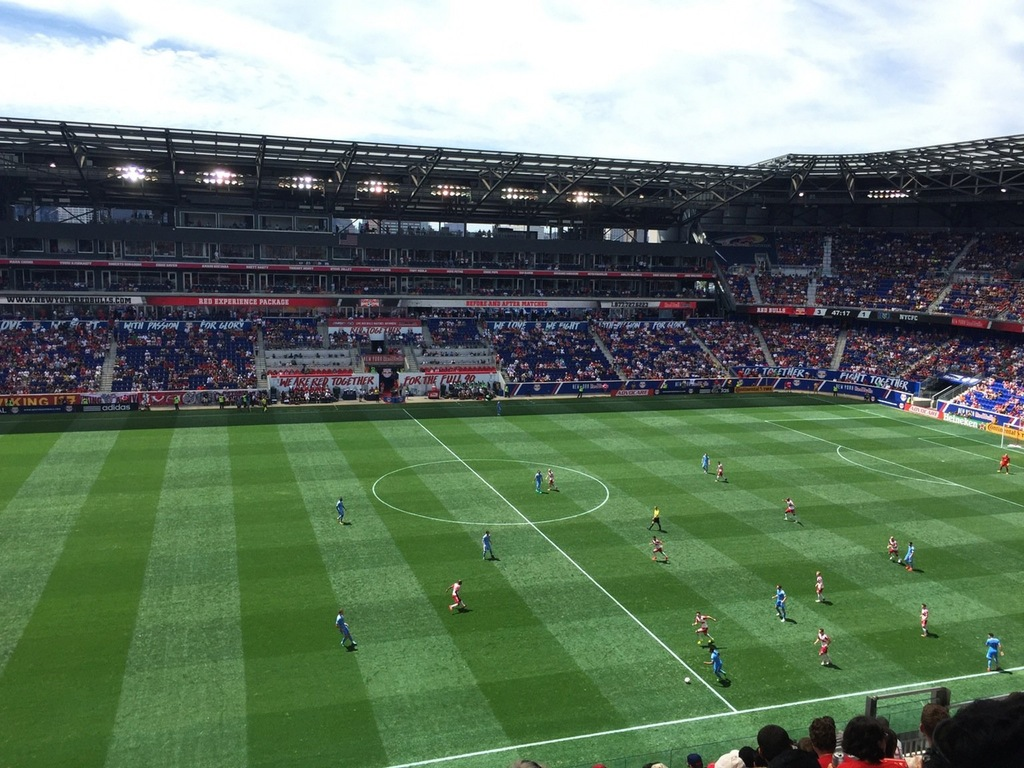
- Red Bull Arena in Harrison, New Jersey, venue of the game
- Event: 2015 Major League Soccer season Regular season, Week 10
New York Red Bulls	New York City FC
2	1
- Date: May 10, 2015; 11 years ago
- Venue: Red Bull Arena, Harrison, New Jersey
- Man of the Match: Bradley Wright-Phillips, Striker
- Referee: Alan Kelly (Republic of Ireland)
- Attendance: 25,217
- Weather: Sunny; 77 °F (25 °C); 62% humidity

In a Major League Soccer (MLS) game on May 10, 2015, at Red Bull Arena in Harrison, New Jersey, the New York Red Bulls defeated the New York City FC by a score of 2–1 on MLS Soccer Sunday coverage on FS1. The matchup, which was part of Week 10 of the 2015 Major League Soccer season, was noted by the press as the first encounter between the two teams from the New York metropolitan area, a rivalry that would later come to be known as the Hudson River Derby. The Red Bulls opened the scoring very early through striker Bradley Wright-Phillips, following a cross from the right flank by Lloyd Sam. However, they were forced to play with ten men from the 36th minute onwards after young center-back Matt Miazga received a indirect red card (two yellow cards). Despite this, Wright-Phillips extended the lead to 2–0 in the 52nd minute. New York City FC substitute Patrick Mullins later narrowed the deficit to 1–2, which proved to be the final score as no further goals were scored.

After that game, the two teams met twice more during the 2015 Regular season session, on June 28 and August 9, with the New York Red Bulls emerging victorious on both occasions. New York City FC failed to qualify for the playoffs, finishing 8th in the Eastern Conference with 37 points, while the Red Bulls topped the conference with 60 points, securing a spot in the conference semifinals. Through their encounters in subsequent seasons, the two teams developed one of the most notable rivalries in MLS history, with their matches consistently drawing significant public attention within the metropolitan area.

== Background ==
The 2015 Major League Soccer season is the 20th season of the Major League Soccer, the professional soccer league in North America and the highest level of the United States soccer league system. The season featured 20 total clubs with 17 based in the United States and 3 based in Canada. The regular season was held from March 6 through to October 25, whereas the MLS Cup playoffs began on October 28 and ended with MLS Cup 2015 on December 6.

The 2015 MLS season featured the addition of two expansion teams, New York City FC and Orlando City SC. New York City FC became the second MLS team in the New York metropolitan area (joining the New Jersey-based New York Red Bulls), as well as the first based within New York City itself, as the team played its inaugural season at Yankee Stadium). Orlando was a new market for MLS, which returned to Florida for the first time since folding their Miami and Tampa Bay franchises before the 2002 season. The Lions' ownership previously owned Orlando's team that played in the league then known as USL Pro from 2010 to 2014; that team that relocated to Louisville for the 2015 season of the rebranded United Soccer League.

=== New York Red Bulls ===
The New York Red Bulls were founded in October 1994 and are one of the ten charter members of MLS. The team began play in the league's inaugural season in 1996 as the New York/New Jersey MetroStars. During this early period, the club experienced significant instability, marked by frequent coaching changes and a lack of any championship titles. Notable achievements during this time included finishing at the top of the Eastern Conference and reaching the playoff semifinals in 2000, as well as a runner-up finish in the 2003 U.S. Open Cup. The team's worst performance during this era occurred in the 1999 season, when they earned only 15 points from 32 matches—the worst record in the club's history.

In 2006, the team was sold to Red Bull GmbH and re-branded as part of the company's global network of soccer clubs. The club name was changed to "Red Bull New York", with the team now referred to as the "New York Red Bulls" by the league and the media. The team pulled off a major surprise by reaching the MLS Cup 2008 despite finishing only 8th during the regular season, but they subsequently plummeted to the bottom of the standings the following season, managing a mere 21 points.

On March 20, 2010, Red Bulls' new stadium, Red Bull Arena (later Sports Illustrated Stadium), was inaugurated. The opening of the new venue, combined with the signing of several high-profile international players, such as Thierry Henry, Rafael Márquez, and Tim Cahill, helped the team improve its performance. The club maintained a consistent streak of appearances in the playoffs, highlighted by winning the 2013 Supporters' Shield and reaching the Eastern Conference final in the 2014 season.

=== New York City FC ===
The 2015 season is the first season of New York City FC in Major League Soccer, they played their home games at Yankee Stadium in the New York City borough of The Bronx.

MLS commissioner Don Garber announced the league's intent to award a second team in the New York area in 2010, with the new team originally aimed to begin operations by 2013. Initially, the league held talks with New York Mets owner Fred Wilpon about a second NY club and with owners of the rebooted New York Cosmos. The Wilpons' interest in MLS reportedly faded following the family's losses in the Madoff investment scandal, while the Cosmos began playing in the second-tier North American Soccer League in 2013. Manchester City, in association with the New York Yankees baseball team, paid the $100 million expansion fee to join the league. New York City Football Club, LLC was also registered with the New York State Department on May 7, 2013, and on May 21, the team was officially announced as the 20th Major League Soccer franchise.

On May 22, 2013, the club named former United States and Manchester City midfielder Claudio Reyna as its director of football operations, responsible for coaching staff and player recruitment ahead of the team's inaugural MLS season in 2015. Reyna, a New Jersey native, also played for the nearby New York Red Bulls. The team announced an English-language radio deal with WFAN on October 3, 2013. On December 11, 2013, Jason Kreis was announced as the first head coach of the new franchise, after declining to extend his contract at Real Salt Lake. The move came just four days after his squad's second-place finish in the MLS Cup 2013, losing on penalties to Sporting Kansas City. Kreis's tenure began with a trip to Manchester, England, to familiarize himself with the set-up of the franchise owners. Kreis' official unveiling was made at a press conference on January 10, 2014, where he made it public that his former assistant Miles Joseph had joined him at the club.

In the 2015 MLS SuperDraft, as an expansion team, New York City had the second overall pick, choosing Oregon State forward Khiry Shelton as their first pick.

== Game summary ==
=== Details ===
External videos
- Game highlights on the Major League Soccer's official website

The New York City FC kicked off the game at 7:00 p.m. EDT. Before more than 25,000 spectators, the New York Red Bulls settled into the match with ease and quickly took the lead. Striker Bradley Wright-Phillips delivered an accurate finish to open the scoring, putting the hosts 1–0 ahead. But in the 35th minute, Red Bulls center-back Matt Miazga received a second yellow card following a foul and was sent off, leaving the hosts to play with 10 men for the remainder of the game.

Despite being a man down, the Red Bulls maintained their high-pressing style of play and created several dangerous opportunities in front of the opposition's goal. Early in the second half, Bradley Wright-Phillips scored his second goal of the match—securing a brace—to extend the Red Bulls' lead to 2–0. During the same half, the visiting side, NYCFC, saw Chris Wingert put the ball into the net, but the goal was disallowed due to an offside offense. Capitalizing on their numerical advantage late in the match, New York City FC pressed forward in attack. Substitute forward Patrick Mullins received a pass from R. J. Allen and finished cleanly to narrow the deficit to 1–2; however, no further goals were scored, thanks to the disciplined defensive play of the host side, the Red Bulls, and the game ended in a victory for the home team.

=== Box score ===
May 10, 2015
7:00 p.m. EDT
Week 10

New York Red Bulls	2–1	New York City FC
Bradley Wright-Phillips 3', 51'	Boxscore	Patrick Mullins 76'

Red Bull Arena, Harrison, New Jersey
Attendance: 25,217
Referee: Alan Kelly
- Game weather: Sunny, 77 °F (25 °C)
- Game duration: 94:00
- Head coach: Jesse Marsch (New York Red Bulls), Jason Kreis (New York City FC)
- TV announcers (FS1): John Strong, Alexi Lalas and Katie Witham

Legend
Pos	Position	Min	Minutes played	GLS	Goals scored	AST	Assists	SHT	Shots made
SOT	Shots on target	PST	Passes	OFF	Offsides	FLS	Fouls	FSF	Fouls suffered

New York Red Bulls
Player	Pos	Min	GLS	AST	SHT	SOT	PST	OFF	FLS	FSF
(Jamaica) Kemar Lawrence	LB	90	0	0	0	0	14	0	3	4
(France) Damien Perrinelle	CB	90	0	0	0	0	17	0	1	0
(United States) Matt Miazga	CB	36	0	0	0	0	9	0	2	0
(United States) Chris Duvall	RB	90	0	0	1	1	24	0	1	0
(Brazil) Felipe Martins	CM	90	0	0	2	1	35	0	1	2
(United States) Dax McCarty	CM	90	0	0	2	0	43	0	1	0
(United States) Sacha Kljestan	AM	90	0	1	2	0	28	0	2	2
(United States) Mike Grella	LW	38	0	0	0	0	9	0	0	0
(England) Bradley Wright-Phillips	ST	78	2	0	5	4	12	3	1	2
(Ghana) Lloyd Sam	RW	87	0	2	2	1	27	2	1	1
(Canada) Karl Ouimette (substituted on)	DF	52	0	0	0	0	1	0	0	0
(Jamaica) Dane Richards (substituted on)	FW	12	0	0	0	0	2	1	0	0
(Costa Rica) Roy Miller (substituted on)	LB	3	0	0	0	0	0	0	0	0
Totals		846	2	3	14	7	221	6	13	11

New York City FC
Player	Pos	Min	GLS	AST	SHT	SOT	PST	OFF	FLS	FSF
(United States) R. J. Allen	LB	90	0	1	1	0	29	0	1	0
(Puerto Rico) Jason Hernandez	CB	90	0	0	0	0	39	0	1	0
(United States) Chris Wingert	CB	90	0	0	0	0	50	1	1	1
(United States) Josh Williams	RB	90	0	0	1	0	49	0	0	0
(United States) Ned Grabavoy	LM	90	0	0	2	1	39	0	0	2
(United States) Mix Diskerud	CM	63	0	0	0	0	23	0	1	1
(United States) Andrew Jacobson	CM	90	0	0	1	0	63	0	3	1
(Spain) Pablo Álvarez	LM	69	0	0	2	0	19	0	0	3
(Spain) David Villa	ST	66	0	0	1	0	13	1	2	0
(United States) Khiry Shelton	ST	90	0	0	0	0	11	0	0	2
(Ghana) Kwadwo Poku (substituted on)	AM	27	0	0	0	0	16	0	1	1
(United States) Patrick Mullins (substituted on)	CF	24	1	0	2	1	8	0	0	1
(Morocco) Mehdi Ballouchy (substituted on)	MF	21	0	0	0	0	13	0	1	0
Totals		900	1	1	10	2	372	2	11	12

Legend
R	Result	RC	Record (W–L–T)	Min	Minutes played	SV	Saves	GA	Goals conceded
PST	Passes	LB	Long ball	PC	Punches	FLS	Fouls	FSF	Fouls suffered

New York Red Bulls
Goalkeeper	R	RC	Min	SV	GA	PST	LB	PC	FLS	FSF
(United States) Kyle Reynish	Did not play									
(United States) Santiago Castaño	Did not play									
(United States) Luis Robles	W	4–1–4	90	1	1	5	16	1	0	0

New York City FC
Goalkeeper	R	RC	Min	SV	GA	PST	LB	PC	FLS	FSF
(Japan) Akira Fitzgerald	Did not play									
(Puerto Rico) Josh Saunders	L	1–5–3	90	4	2	17	15	0	0	0
(United States) Ryan Meara	Did not play									

=== Statistical comparison ===
Red Bulls	Statistics	NY City
2	Scores	1
40%	Possession	60%
14	Shots	10
7	Shots on target	2
3	Blocked shots	4
1	Saves	5
6	Corners	4
13	Fouls committed	11
2	Yellow cards	3
1	Red cards	0
