= Shay Facey =

English footballer

Personal information
- Full name: Shay Anthony Facey
- Date of birth: 7 January 1995 (age 31)
- Place of birth: Sale, England
- Height: 5 ft 10 in (1.79 m)
- Position: Defender

Youth career
- 2007–2013: Manchester City

Senior career*
| Years | Team | Apps | (Gls) |
| 2013–2018 | Manchester City | 0 | (0) |
| 2015 | → New York City (loan) | 23 | (0) |
| 2016 | → Rotherham United (loan) | 5 | (0) |
| 2016–2017 | → Heerenveen (loan) | 3 | (0) |
| 2018–2019 | Northampton Town | 38 | (1) |
| 2019–2020 | Walsall | 13 | (0) |

International career^{‡}
| 2009–2011 | England U16 | 3 | (0) |
| 2011 | England U17 | 7 | (0) |
| 2013–2014 | England U19 | 7 | (0) |
| 2014 | England U20 | 2 | (0) |
- * Club domestic league appearances and goals as of 4 April 2020 ‡ National team caps and goals as of 22:08, 16 March 2015 (UTC)

Shay Anthony Facey (born 7 January 1995) is an English footballer who plays as a defender.

== Career ==
=== Manchester City ===
Facey joined Manchester City in 2007, where he progressed through the academy system.But never scored a goal.

Facey was vice-captain of the U21 Elite Development Squad through their 2013–14 campaign in the absence of Rony Lopes and was nominated for the U21 player of the year award. As a result, he signed a two–year contract with the club in April 2014. Then, in November 2015, Facey signed another contract extension with the club.

==== Loan spells ====
Facey joined Manchester City's Major League Soccer sister club New York City FC on a season-long loan in March 2015, after impressing New York manager Jason Kreis who spent time with the club through 2014 and 2015. Prior to signing for the club, Facey trained with the side the previous month. He made his professional debut on 15 March 2015 as a 79th-minute substitute for Josh Williams during a 2–0 win over the New England Revolution in the team's first home match. Six days later on his first professional start, he was sent off in a goalless draw away to the Colorado Rapids for pulling down Juan Edgardo Ramírez. Following this, Facey spent two months on the sidelines, due to injury. After returning to the first team from injury, Facey quickly regained his first team place and started in number of matches. Because of this, on 25 June 2015, Facey confirmed that his contract had been extended to the end of the MLS season. Despite sidelined over injury and suspension once more during the season, Facey went on to make 24 appearances in all competition and returned to his parent club at the end of the 2015 season.

After returning from New York City FC, Facey signed on loan with Championship side, Rotherham United, for the rest of the 2015–16 season. Facey made his debut for Rotherham United, where he started the game, in a 2–1 loss against Preston North End. He made 5 appearances for Rotherham United during his loan, but failed to score a goal and lost his first team place to Frazer Richardson for the rest of the season.

On 31 August 2016, Facey signed for Eredivisie side SC Heerenveen on a season-long loan. Facey made his SC Heerenveen debut, coming on as a second–half substitute for Jerry St. Juste, in a 3–1 win over FC Twente on 10 September 2016. However, on his second appearance for the side, he was sent–off for a second–bookable offence, in a 3–0 win over Roda JC. Following this, Facey soon found himself out of the first team after he spent most of the seasons with injuries. Around March 2017, Facey left the club over personal circumstances. At the end of the 2016–17 season, Facey went on to make four appearances for the side in all competitions.

=== Northampton Town ===
On 5 January 2018, Facey joined League One side Northampton Town, signing an 18 months contract on an undisclosed fee. The move also ended his decade stay at Manchester City. Upon joining the club, Facey said about the move, quoting: "I don't see these first six months as a bedding in period or anything like that, I want to come here and make an impact. I want to become a force to be seen in the team."

Facey made his Northampton Town debut, where he started the whole game, in a 3–1 win over Southend United on 6 January 2018.

He was one of 8 players released by Northampton at the end of the 2018–19 season; a further 3 were placed for sale.

== International career ==
Facey represented England U16, England U17, England U19 and England U20.

On 5 November 2009, Facey made his England U16 debut, where he started the game before being substituted in the 67th minute, in a 2–0 loss against Northern Ireland U16. He made three appearances for England U16 side.

Two years later, Facey made his England U17 debut, where he started the game, in a 1–0 win over Faroe Islands U17 on 24 August 2011. He went on to make seven appearances for England U17 side. A year later in October 2012, he was included for the England U18 but did not make an appearance. .

In October 2013, Facey was called up for the England U19 squad, making his debut, in a 1–0 win over Switzerland U19. Facey have since made seven appearances for the U19 side.

Later in 2014, Facey was called up by England U20, making his debut for the side, in a 6–0 win over Romania U19 on 5 September 2014. He made another appearance (and last) for England U20 side, where he suffered an injury in the first half and was substituted, in a 2–2 draw against Canada U20 on 12 November 2014.

== Career statistics ==
As of match played 22 February 2020

Appearances and goals by club, season and competition
| Club | Season | League | | | National Cup | | League Cup | | Other | | Total | |
| Club | Season | Division | Apps | Goals | Apps | Goals | Apps | Goals | Apps | Goals | Apps | Goals |
|---|---|---|---|---|---|---|---|---|---|---|---|---|
| New York City (loan) | 2015 | Major League Soccer | 23 | 0 | 1 | 0 | – | | 0 | 0 | 24 | 0 |
| Rotherham United (loan) | 2015–16 | Championship | 5 | 0 | 1 | 0 | 0 | 0 | – | | 6 | 0 |
| Heerenveen (loan) | 2016–17 | Eredivisie | 3 | 0 | 1 | 0 | – | | 0 | 0 | 4 | 0 |
| Northampton Town | 2017–18 | League One | 15 | 1 | 0 | 0 | 0 | 0 | 0 | 0 | 15 | 1 |
| Northampton Town | 2018–19 | League Two | 23 | 0 | 0 | 0 | 1 | 0 | 3 (Note: Appearances in EFL Trophy) | 0 | 27 | 0 |
| Northampton Town | Total | | 38 | 1 | 0 | 0 | 1 | 0 | 3 | 0 | 42 | 1 |
| Walsall | 2019–20 | League Two | 13 | 0 | 2 | 0 | 0 | 0 | 2 | 0 | 17 | 0 |
| Career total | | | 82 | 1 | 5 | 0 | 1 | 0 | 5 | 0 | 93 | 1 |
