= Minute (association football) =

In association football (soccer), the term minute refers to the unit of time used to track both the duration of a match and the cumulative participation of individual players. It is the fundamental metric for quantifying gameplay, tactical substitutions, and the timing of match events.

== Duration ==
A standard association football match is divided into two halves, each lasting 45 minutes, for a total of 90 minutes of regulation time.

- Regualation time: The time allocated for play, excluding stoppages.
- Stoppage time: At the end of each 45-minute half, the referee adds an additional duration—determined by the number and length of stoppages (such as injuries, substitutions, or goal celebrations)—to account for time lost. This is displayed to the fourth official and the spectators.
- Extra time: In knockout competitions where a winner must be determined, if the score is tied after 90 minutes, an additional 30 minutes may be played, divided into two 15-minute periods.

== Player participation ==
In professional statistics, a player's contribution is measured by the number of minutes they are on the pitch. This is a critical metric for coaches, scouts, and analysts to evaluate player performance, fatigue, and fitness.

- Total minutes played: This value represents the total time a player has been on the field during a match, including added stoppage time.
- Substitution Impact: If a player enters the game as a substitute in the 60th minute and the match ends after 95 minutes (including stoppage time), they are credited with 35 minutes played.
- Statistical Normalization: Metrics such as "Goals per 90 minutes" or "Assists per 90 minutes" are used to compare the efficiency of players who have vastly different amounts of total playing time throughout a season.

== Recording and Notation ==
Match events are universally recorded by the minute they occur. In official match reports, a goal scored at 32:15 is recorded as occurring in the 32nd minute.

Events occurring during stoppage time are denoted with a plus sign. For example, a goal scored three minutes into the stoppage time of the first half is typically recorded as 45+3'.

== See also ==
- Laws of the Game (association football)
- Substitute (association football)
