= Angeliño =

Spanish footballer (born 1997)

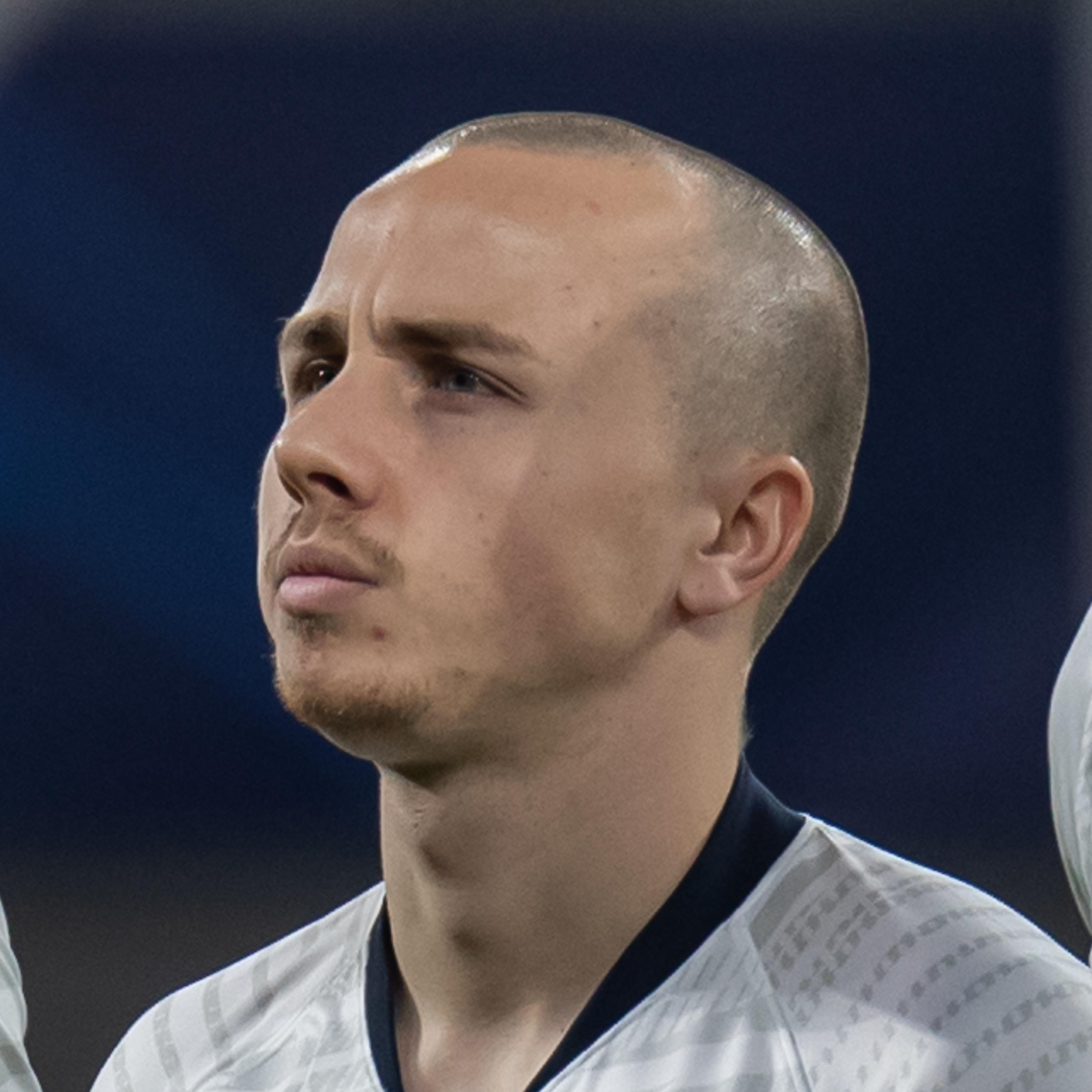
- Angeliño with RB Leipzig in 2020

Personal information
- Full name: José Ángel Esmorís Tasende
- Date of birth: 4 January 1997 (age 29)
- Place of birth: Coristanco, Spain
- Height: 1.75 m (5 ft 9 in)
- Positions: Left wing-back; left-back

Team information
- Current team: Deportivo A Coruña (on loan from Roma)
- Number: 17

Youth career
- 2001–2007: Luis Calvo Sanz
- 2007–2013: Deportivo A Coruña
- 2013–2015: Manchester City

Senior career*
| Years | Team | Apps | (Gls) |
| 2015–2018 | Manchester City | 0 | (0) |
| 2015 | → New York City FC (loan) | 14 | (0) |
| 2017 | → Girona (loan) | 0 | (0) |
| 2017 | → Mallorca (loan) | 17 | (0) |
| 2017–2018 | → NAC Breda (loan) | 34 | (3) |
| 2018–2019 | PSV Eindhoven | 34 | (1) |
| 2019–2021 | Manchester City | 6 | (0) |
| 2020–2021 | → RB Leipzig (loan) | 39 | (5) |
| 2021–2024 | RB Leipzig | 29 | (2) |
| 2022–2023 | → TSG Hoffenheim (loan) | 33 | (0) |
| 2023–2024 | → Galatasaray (loan) | 8 | (0) |
| 2024 | → Roma (loan) | 16 | (0) |
| 2024– | Roma | 45 | (2) |
| 2026– | → Deportivo A Coruña (loan) | 1 | (0) |

International career
| 2013 | Spain U17 | 1 | (0) |
| 2018 | Spain U21 | 2 | (0) |
| 2016 | Galicia | 1 | (0) |
- * Club domestic league appearances and goals as of 16 September 2026

José Ángel Esmorís Tasende (Spanish: [xoˈse ˈaŋxel esmoˈɾis taˈsende]; born 4 January 1997), better known as Angeliño ([aŋxeˈliɲo]), is a Spanish professional footballer who plays as a left wing-back or left-back for La Liga club Deportivo A Coruña, on loan from Serie A club Roma.

== Club career ==
=== Early career ===
Angeliño was born in Coristanco, Galicia. He joined Deportivo La Coruña's youth setup in 2007 at age 10, after starting it out at EF Luis Calvo Sanz (the youth setup of Bergantiños FC) in Carballo, Galicia. He spent six years in their youth system.

=== Manchester City ===
On 8 July 2012, Angeliño signed a four-year deal with Manchester City, being effective in January of the following year. Initially assigned to the under-18s, he also appeared regularly with the reserves.

On 30 January 2016, Angeliño made his debut for the first team in a 4–0 away win against Aston Villa, coming on in the 81st minute to replace Gaël Clichy in the FA Cup. He played for the club twice in the 2016–17 season, making his Champions League debut on 24 August, as a substitute in a 1–0 win over Steaua București. His next appearance came on 21 September, starting in a 2–1 win over Swansea City in the EFL Cup.

==== Loans to New York City, Girona, and NAC Breda ====
Angeliño signed for New York City on loan in 2015. Angeliño made his professional debut for the club on 12 July 2015 in a 4–4 draw against Toronto. Angeliño came on for Kwame Watson-Siriboe in the 46th minute and played the entire second half of the match. He made his first start in a 1–0 defeat to New England Revolution, playing the full 90 minutes.

It was announced on 27 December 2016 that Angeliño would be loaned to Girona from 1 January 2017 to the end of the season. On 31 January, it was announced that, having not made a single appearance for Girona, Angeliño would instead be loaned to Mallorca. He made his debut on 5 February, in a substitute appearance in a 2–1 loss to Real Oviedo.

On 4 July 2017, Angeliño was loaned to NAC Breda for the forthcoming season. During his season, he won four Rookie of the Month awards while scoring three goals and delivering seven assists.

=== PSV Eindhoven ===
After his impressive debut season in the Eredivisie with Breda, Angeliño signed for PSV Eindhoven on 15 June 2018, signing a five-year contract. By the season's end, he was voted into the Eredivisie Team of the Season and was named the Talent of the Season, after winning 189 duels and creating 68 chances.

=== Return to Manchester City ===
Manchester City re-signed Angeliño on 3 July 2019 after triggering a buy-back clause in his contract. Angeliño made his debut in the 2019–20 Premier League season on 21 September, coming on as a half-time substitute for Benjamin Mendy in an 8–0 routing of Watford at the Etihad.

==== Loans to RB Leipzig ====
On 31 January 2020, having made 12 appearances for Manchester City, Angeliño was loaned to Bundesliga club RB Leipzig until the end of the season. He made 13 league appearances, scoring once and assisting three times. On 13 August, Angeliño provided the assist for the late winning goal in a 2–1 victory against Atlético Madrid in the Champions League quarter-final, helping the club reach their first ever Champions League semi-final.

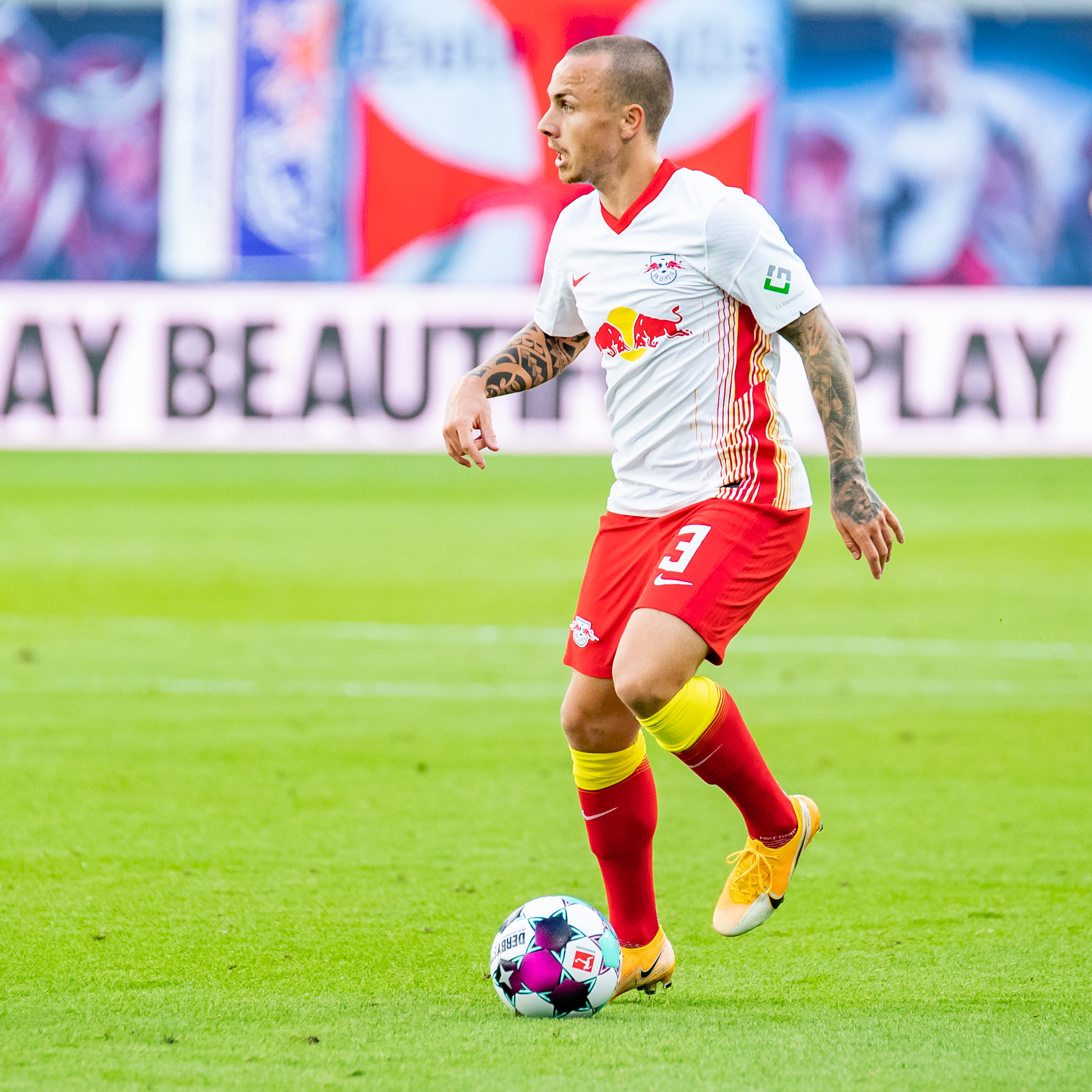
Angeliño playing for RB Leipzig in 2020

On 8 September 2020, Manchester City announced that Angeliño's loan to RB Leipzig would be extended for the duration of the 2020–21 campaign. On 20 October, Angeliño scored a brace in a 2–0 win over İstanbul Başakşehir in the 2020–21 UEFA Champions League. In the final group stage match on 8 December, Angeliño scored his side's first goal in a 3–2 win over his parent club's rivals Manchester United to eliminate them from the competition.

=== Permanent move to RB Leipzig ===
On 12 February 2021, Angeliño's loan to Leipzig was made permanent after he signed a four-year contract with the German club, for an undisclosed fee.

==== Loan to TSG Hoffenheim ====
On 8 August 2022, fellow Bundesliga side TSG Hoffenheim announced the signing of Angeliño on a season-long loan deal.

==== Loan to Galatasaray ====
On 12 July 2023, it was announced by Turkish side Galatasaray that they were in negotiations with Leipzig for Angeliño. The next day, he joined the club on a season-long loan deal. A transfer fee of €6,000,000 was agreed to as a conditional purchase price should he have signed on a permanent basis at the end of his loan term.

==== Loan to Roma and permanent signing ====
On 30 January 2024, Angeliño moved on loan to Serie A club Roma, with an option to buy at the end of the season. On 30 May, his loan to Roma was made permanent for a €5,000,000 fee, subsequently ending his career with Leipzig.

==== Loan to Deportivo A Coruña ====
On 5 August 2026, Angeliño returned to Spain after agreeing to a one-year loan deal with Deportivo de A Coruña from Roma, with a buyout clause.

== Personal life ==
Angeliño's younger brother Dani Tasende is also a footballer and a left-back. He formerly played for Manchester City's youth team and currently plays for Segunda División side Córdoba.

== Career statistics ==
As of match played 16 September 2026

Appearances and goals by club, season and competition
| Club | Season | League | | | National cup (Note: Includes FA Cup, KNVB Cup, DFB-Pokal, Coppa Italia) | | League cup (Note: Includes EFL Cup) | | Continental | | Other | | Total | |
| Club | Season | Division | Apps | Goals | Apps | Goals | Apps | Goals | Apps | Goals | Apps | Goals | Apps | Goals |
|---|---|---|---|---|---|---|---|---|---|---|---|---|---|---|
| Manchester City | 2014–15 | Premier League | 0 | 0 | 0 | 0 | 0 | 0 | 0 | 0 | 0 | 0 | 0 | 0 |
| Manchester City | 2015–16 | Premier League | 0 | 0 | 1 | 0 | 0 | 0 | 0 | 0 | — | | 1 | 0 |
| Manchester City | 2016–17 | Premier League | 0 | 0 | 0 | 0 | 1 | 0 | 1 (Note: Appearance(s) in UEFA Champions League) | 0 | — | | 2 | 0 |
| Manchester City | Total | | 0 | 0 | 1 | 0 | 1 | 0 | 1 | 0 | 0 | 0 | 3 | 0 |
| New York City FC (loan) | 2015 | Major League Soccer | 14 | 0 | 0 | 0 | 0 | 0 | — | | — | | 14 | 0 |
| Girona (loan) | 2016–17 | Segunda División | 0 | 0 | 0 | 0 | — | | — | | — | | 0 | 0 |
| Mallorca (loan) | 2016–17 | Segunda División | 17 | 0 | 0 | 0 | — | | — | | — | | 17 | 0 |
| NAC Breda (loan) | 2017–18 | Eredivisie | 34 | 3 | 1 | 0 | — | | — | | — | | 35 | 3 |
| PSV Eindhoven | 2018–19 | Eredivisie | 34 | 1 | 0 | 0 | — | | 8 | 0 | 1 (Note: Appearance in Johan Cruyff Shield) | 0 | 43 | 1 |
| Manchester City | 2019–20 | Premier League | 6 | 0 | 2 | 0 | 3 | 0 | 1 | 0 | 0 | 0 | 12 | 0 |
| RB Leipzig (loan) | 2019–20 | Bundesliga | 13 | 1 | 1 | 0 | — | | 4 | 0 | — | | 18 | 1 |
| RB Leipzig (loan) | 2020–21 | Bundesliga | 26 | 4 | 4 | 1 | — | | 7 | 3 | — | | 37 | 8 |
| RB Leipzig | 2021–22 | Bundesliga | 29 | 2 | 5 | 0 | — | | 11 (Note: Five appearances in UEFA Champions League, six appearances and one goal in UEFA Europa League) | 1 | — | | 45 | 3 |
| RB Leipzig | Leipzig total | | 68 | 7 | 10 | 1 | — | | 22 | 4 | — | | 100 | 12 |
| TSG Hoffenheim (loan) | 2022–23 | Bundesliga | 33 | 0 | 2 | 1 | — | | — | | — | | 35 | 1 |
| Galatasaray (loan) | 2023–24 | Süper Lig | 8 | 0 | 0 | 0 | — | | 11 | 1 | 0 | 0 | 19 | 1 |
| Roma (loan) | 2023–24 | Serie A | 16 | 0 | — | | — | | 4 (Note: Appearances in UEFA Europa League) | 0 | — | | 20 | 0 |
| Roma | 2024–25 | Serie A | 38 | 2 | 2 | 0 | — | | 11 | 2 | — | | 51 | 4 |
| Roma | 2025–26 | Serie A | 7 | 0 | 0 | 0 | — | | 2 | 0 | — | | 9 | 0 |
| Roma | Roma total | | 61 | 2 | 2 | 0 | — | | 17 | 2 | — | | 80 | 4 |
| Deportivo A Coruña (loan) | 2026–27 | La Liga | 1 | 0 | 0 | 0 | — | | — | | — | | 1 | 0 |
| Career total | | | 276 | 13 | 18 | 2 | 4 | 0 | 60 | 7 | 1 | 0 | 359 | 22 |

== Honours ==
Manchester City

- FA Community Shield: 2019

RB Leipzig

- DFB-Pokal: 2021–22

Individual

- Manchester City EDS Player of the Year: 2014–15
- Eredivisie Talent of the Month: September 2017, December 2017, February 2018, April 2018, September 2018
- Eredivisie Talent of the Year: 2018–19
- Eredivisie Team of the Year: 2017–18, 2018–19
- UEFA Champions League Squad of the Season: 2019–20
- Bundesliga Team of the Season: 2020–21
- kicker Bundesliga Team of the Season: 2020–21
