= Connor Brandt =

American soccer player (born 1992)

Personal information
- Date of birth: September 15, 1992 (age 34)
- Place of birth: San Diego, California, United States
- Height: 1.85 m (6 ft 1 in)
- Positions: Midfielder; defender

College career
| Years | Team | Apps | (Gls) |
| 2011 | Cal State Dominguez Hills Toros | | |
| 2012–2014 | San Diego Toreros | | |

Senior career*
| Years | Team | Apps | (Gls) |
| 2013–2014 | FC Tucson | 22 | (8) |
| 2015–2016 | New York City FC | 1 | (0) |
| 2015–2016 | → Wilmington Hammerheads (loan) | 1 | (0) |
- * Club domestic league appearances and goals as of November 12, 2016

Connor Brandt (born September 15, 1992) is an American soccer player. He most notably played for New York City FC

== Career ==
=== College and amateur ===
Born in San Diego, California, Brandt attended Great Oak High School in Temecula, where he lettered for their soccer program twice, captaining the varsity team and scoring 20 goals in his two varsity seasons. Leaving for college, Brandt first studied at California State University, Dominguez Hills, scoring four goals for the Toros, plus earning himself a CCAA Player of the Week award. Transferring to the University of San Diego, where he studied Sociology, Brandt worked his way to a host of Player of the Week awards at various levels in his second year. By his third season, he was earning national college soccer Team of the Week awards, as well as a place on the first team for the All-WCC select and earning himself a Star of the Month award for the San Diego Hall of Champions. In his final season, Brandt retained his place in the All-WCC first team and made the NSCAA first team in addition, adding to his burgeoning award selection with WCC Player of the Year gong plus a second Star of the Month award and selection twice as WCC Player of the Week.

=== Professional ===
On January 15, 2015, Brandt was selected 23rd overall by New York City FC in the 2015 MLS SuperDraft.

Brandt was loaned to New York City's USL affiliate Wilmington Hammerheads in April 2015, making his professional debut on April 12, 2015, as a 60th-minute substitute during a 3–0 win over New York Red Bulls II.

Brandt was waived by New York City FC on February 8, 2017.
