= Andrés Mendoza (Ecuadorian footballer) =

Ecuadorian footballer (born 1989)

Personal information
- Full name: Jorge Andrés Mendoza Uza
- Date of birth: August 16, 1989 (age 37)
- Place of birth: Guayaquil, Ecuador
- Height: 6 ft 2 in (1.88 m)
- Position: Defender

Team information
- Current team: El Nacional

Youth career
- 2006–2007: Club 9 de Octubre
- 2007–2008: Alfaro Moreno

Senior career*
Years	Team	Apps	(Gls)
2008	Independiente del Valle	4	(0)
2009	Barcelona SC	2	(0)
2010	→ LDU Portoviejo (loan)	27	(0)
2011	→ Aucas (loan)	32	(2)
2012–2014	Universidad Católica	86	(5)
2014	Deportivo Maldonado	11	(0)
2015	New York City FC	0	(0)
2015	→ Wilmington Hammerheads (loan)	1	(1)
2015	LDU Quito	1	(0)
2016	FC Juárez	8	(0)
2017–2018	Clan Juvenil	3	(0)
2018	Olmedo	?	(1)
2019–	El Nacional	0	(0)
- * Club domestic league appearances and goals as of 29 January 2019

Jorge Andrés Mendoza Uza (Note: In this Spanish name, the first or paternal surname is Mendoza and the second or maternal family name is Uza.) (born August 16, 1989), known as Andrés Mendoza, is an Ecuadorian footballer who plays for CD El Nacional.

== Career ==
Andrés Mendoza began his career with Club 9 de Octubre in 2006 and thereafter joined Academia Alfaro Moreno in 2007. In 2008, he joined Independiente del Valle making his professional debut with the club that same season. The following season, top Ecuadorian club Barcelona SC acquired Mendoza and loaned him to LDU Portoviejo in the Ecuadorian Serie B. In his one season with Portoviejo, Mendoza made 27 appearances for the club. The following season, he was loaned to Aucas but never made an appearance for the first team. In 2012 Universidad Católica purchased Mendoza's rights and in his first year he helped the club win promotion to the top flight as 2012 Ecuadorian Serie B champions.

In September 2014, Mendoza was sold to Deportivo Maldonado in Uruguay. In his short stay with Deportivo Mendoza appeared in 11 league matches for the Rojiverde. On January 5, 2015, it was announced that Mendoza was joining Major League Soccer club New York City FC.
