= 2014 MLS expansion draft =

Player draft for MLS teams

2014 MLS Expansion Draft

General information
- Date(s): November 19–December 10, 2014

Overview
- Expansion teams: New York City FC; Orlando City SC
- Expansion season: 2015
- Merging teams: Chivas USA (folded in 2014)

The 2014 MLS Expansion Draft was a draft for the Major League Soccer expansion teams New York City FC and Orlando City SC that took place between November 19 and December 10, 2014. The first two rounds of the draft (which were known as the 2014 MLS Dispersal Draft) were held to distribute players who were formerly contracted with Chivas USA, which was dissolved by the league in October 2014 shortly after the end of the 2014 MLS season.

As determined by a "priority draft" that was conducted on September 24, 2014, Orlando City SC selected first in the expansion draft, which was held via conference call at 2:00 pm EST (UTC-5) on December 10, 2014. The order of the dispersal draft was conducted through a random weighted draw that took place on November 14, 2014. The league confirmed on November 7, 2014 that Chivas USA striker Erick Torres would not be made available in the dispersal draft.

== Draft format ==
- Existing teams were allowed to protect 11 players from their rosters. Generation Adidas players and Homegrown Players on supplemental rosters were automatically protected, though players who graduated from the program to the senior roster at the end of the 2014 season were not.
- Once a player was claimed from a club’s non-protected roster, that club was allowed to move a player from its non-protected roster to its protected roster.
- Once two players were claimed from a team’s non-protected roster, that team was eliminated from the expansion draft and not allowed to lose any further players.

== Player selection ==
=== Round 1 ===
Pick #	Drafting team	Player	Position
1	FC Dallas	Dan Kennedy	Goalkeeper
2	New York City FC	Matt Dunn	Midfielder
3	Sporting Kansas City	Pass	
4	D.C. United	Thomas McNamara	Midfielder
5	New England Revolution	Pass	
6	Montreal Impact	Donny Toia	Defender
7	Orlando City SC	Pass	
8	Colorado Rapids	Caleb Calvert	Forward
9	San Jose Earthquakes	Kris Tyrpak	Forward
10	Real Salt Lake	Pass	
11	Houston Dynamo	Pass	
12	Portland Timbers	Pass	
13	Chicago Fire	Pass	
14	Toronto FC	Marco Delgado	Midfielder
15	Columbus Crew SC	Pass	
16	Los Angeles Galaxy	Pass	
17	Philadelphia Union	Pass	
18	New York Red Bulls	Pass	
19	Seattle Sounders FC	Pass	
20	Vancouver Whitecaps FC	Pass	

=== Round 2 ===
Pick #	Drafting team	Player	Position
1	FC Dallas	Pass	
2	New York City FC	Pass	
3	D.C. United	Pass	
4	Montreal Impact	Pass	
5	Colorado Rapids	Pass	
6	San Jose Earthquakes	Pass	
7	Toronto FC	Pass	

=== Expansion draft ===
Pick	MLS team	Player	Previous team
1	Orlando City SC	Donovan Ricketts	Portland Timbers
2	New York City FC	Ned Grabavoy	Real Salt Lake
3	Orlando City SC	Tony Cascio	Colorado Rapids
4	New York City FC	Patrick Mullins	New England Revolution
5	Orlando City SC	Jalil Anibaba	Seattle Sounders FC
6	New York City FC	Jason Hernandez	San Jose Earthquakes
7	Orlando City SC	Pedro Ribeiro	Philadelphia Union
8	New York City FC	Daniel Lovitz	Toronto FC
9	Orlando City SC	Lewis Neal	D.C. United
10	New York City FC	Tony Taylor	New England Revolution
11	Orlando City SC	Jairo Arrieta	Columbus Crew
12	New York City FC	Mehdi Ballouchy	Vancouver Whitecaps FC
13	Orlando City SC	Heath Pearce	Montreal Impact
14	New York City FC	George John	FC Dallas
15	Orlando City SC	Danny Mwanga	Colorado Rapids
16	New York City FC	Tommy McNamara	D.C. United
17	Orlando City SC	Mark Sherrod	Houston Dynamo
18	New York City FC	Sal Zizzo	Sporting Kansas City
19	Orlando City SC	Eric Gehrig	Columbus Crew
20	New York City FC	Chris Wingert	Real Salt Lake

Five teams lost two players in the draft: Colorado Rapids, Columbus Crew, D.C. United, New England Revolution, and Real Salt Lake. Three teams did not lose any players: Chicago Fire, LA Galaxy, and New York Red Bulls. The remaining teams lost one player each.

== Unselected players ==
The following players were on the final roster of Chivas USA but were not selected in the first two rounds of the draft. This list does not include players who were on loan to Chivas USA.

No.	Position	Nation	Player
-	DF	(United States) USA	Bobby Burling
-	DF	(United States) USA	Carlos Bocanegra
-	DF	(New Zealand) NZL	Tony Lochhead
-	MF	(Argentina) ARG	Martín Rivero
-	MF	(England) ENG	Nigel Reo-Coker
-	MF	(Argentina) ARG	Agustín Pelletieri
-	DF	(United States) USA	Michael Nwiloh
-	DF	(Japan) JPN	Akira Kaji
-	MF	(United States) USA	Eric Avila
-	DF	(United States) USA	Andrew Jean-Baptiste
-	MF	(Honduras) HON	Marvin Chávez
-	FW	(United States) USA	Ryan Finley
-	GK	(United States) USA	Trevor Spangenberg
-	MF	(United States) USA	Nathan Sturgis
-	MF	(Ecuador) ECU	Oswaldo Minda (DP)
-	DF	(Colombia) COL	Jhon Kennedy Hurtado

== Other Chivas USA assets ==
Two draft picks held by Chivas USA at the time of its contraction were deleted from the 2015 MLS SuperDraft and not made available for selection in the dispersal draft. These two deleted draft picks were Chivas USA's natural third-round and fourth-round selections. Had Chivas USA not been contracted these would have been overall selections #48 and #69 in the 2015 SuperDraft.

Prior to being contracted, Chivas USA had already traded away its natural 2015 SuperDraft round 1 (pick #6 to Toronto FC) and round 2 (pick #27 to Seattle Sounders FC) selections. It had also acquired a round 4 pick from D.C. United but Chivas had later traded this pick to Colorado Rapids. These picks, along with a round 2 selection in the 2016 MLS SuperDraft traded to Columbus Crew SC, remained with the clubs which acquired them.

As of August 2015, the league had not announced the fate of the extra permanent international roster slot acquired by Chivas USA from Real Salt Lake in November 2004.
