= Tony Taylor (footballer, born 1989) =

Panamanian footballer (born 1989)

Personal information
- Full name: Alejandro Antonio Taylor
- Date of birth: July 13, 1989 (age 37)
- Place of birth: Long Beach, California, United States
- Height: 6 ft 0 in (1.83 m)
- Position: Striker

College career
Years	Team	Apps	(Gls)
2007	South Florida Bulls	20	(4)
2008	Jacksonville Dolphins	13	(6)

Senior career*
Years	Team	Apps	(Gls)
2007–2008	Central Florida Kraze	7	(10)
2009	Lynch's Irish Pub F.C.		
2010–2013	Estoril Praia	41	(8)
2011	→ Atlético CP (loan)	10	(3)
2013–2014	Omonia	52	(35)
2014	New England Revolution	1	(0)
2015–2016	New York City FC	16	(5)
2017	Paços de Ferreira	2	(0)
2017	Jacksonville Armada	12	(4)
2018	Ottawa Fury	32	(6)
2019	Puskás Akadémia	1	(0)
2019	San Antonio FC	4	(0)

International career^{‡}
2009	United States U20	11	(2)
2012	United States U23	1	(0)
2016–2017	Panama	3	(0)
Medal record
Representing United States
Runner-up	CONCACAF U-20 Championship	2009
- * Club domestic league appearances and goals as of 01:56, 27 October 2019 (UTC) ‡ National team caps and goals as of 00:30, February 17, 2017 (UTC)

Alejandro Antonio "Tony" Taylor (born July 13, 1989) is a professional footballer who plays as a striker.

Born in the United States, his parents are of Panamanian descent and he was called up to the Panama national football team for the first time in September 2016.

== Club career ==
=== Youth and amateur ===
Taylor was born in Long Beach, California, but grew up in Jacksonville, Florida, and attended Bishop Kenny High School, moving on to play one year of college soccer at the University of South Florida, before transferring to Jacksonville University as a sophomore. As a Dolphin, Taylor helped the team achieve one of the best seasons in the program's history. In 2008, with the help of Taylor, the Dolphins went 7–2 in the Atlantic Sun and won the conference tournament. In the NCAA tournament the Dolphins defeated Louisville in their first round matchup with Taylor providing a goal and an assist. He left Jacksonville after his sophomore year, and travelled to Europe intending to turn professional. He trained with Norwegian club IK Start, playing in a pre-season friendly, before signing with Traffic Sports of Brazil.

During his college years Taylor played for the Central Florida Kraze in the USL Premier Development League, netting 10 goals in seven games, and being named finalist for U-19 PDL player of the year. He was also a member of Jacksonville-based USASA club Lynch's FC's run to the first round of the US Open Cup in 2009.

=== Professional ===
In December 2009 Traffic announced that they would be loaning Taylor to Estoril Praia. He made his league debut on April 18, 2010, against Penafiel and scored his first goal the following weekend in a 1–0 win against Aves. Taylor went out on loan to Atletico CP from August until December 2011. Taylor returned to Estoril Praia after his loan spell but did not renew his contract with the club following the 2012–13 season. In August 2014 Taylor was acquired by the New England Revolution of the MLS through a weighted lottery. In December 2014, Taylor was selected by New York City FC as their 5th pick (and 10th overall pick) in the 2014 expansion draft, having been left unprotected by the New England Revolution. On February 10, 2015, Taylor scored the second goal in NYCFC's inaugural pre-season friendly against St Mirren, the game ended 2–0 in New York's favour.

Taylor's option was not exercised by NYCFC at the end of the 2016 season. On January 31, 2017, Taylor joined Primeira Liga side Paços de Ferreira. Taylor was signed by Jacksonville Armada FC on July 28, 2017.

On February 26, 2018, Taylor signed with the Ottawa Fury in the United Soccer League.

== International career ==
Taylor played with the United States U-20s, participating in the 2009 FIFA U-20 World Cup. He also played with the United States U-23 Olympic Qualifying team participating in the 2012 CONCACAF Olympic Qualifying Tournament.

In September 2016, Taylor was called up for the first time to the Panama national football team for a friendly against the Mexico national football team on October 11, 2016. Both of Taylor's parents are Panamanian-born. Taylor debuted for Panama in a 0–0 2018 World Cup qualification tie against Mexico. In January 2017, Taylor played two matches for Panama at the 2017 Copa Centroamericana.

== Career statistics ==
=== Club ===
As of February 17, 2017

Club statistics
Club	Season	League			Cup		League Cup		Continental		Other		Total	
Club	Season	Division	Apps	Goals	Apps	Goals	Apps	Goals	Apps	Goals	Apps	Goals	Apps	Goals
Paços de Ferreira	2016–17	Primeira Liga	2	0	—		—		—		0	0	2	0
Paços de Ferreira	Total		2	0	—		—		—		0	0	2	0
Career total			2	0	—		—		—		0	0	2	0

=== International ===
As of February 17, 2017

National team	Year	Apps	Goals
Panama
Panama	2016	1	0
Panama	2017	2	0
Total		3	0
