= Javier Calle =

Colombian footballer (born 1991)

Personal information
- Full name: Javier Calle Estrada
- Date of birth: April 29, 1991 (age 35)
- Place of birth: Medellín, Colombia
- Height: 1.76 m (5 ft 9 in)
- Position: Midfielder

Youth career
- –2009: San Fernando de Guayabal la Raya

Senior career*
Years	Team	Apps	(Gls)
2009–2019	Independiente Medellín	93	(6)
2012	→ América de Cali (loan)	12	(1)
2013	→ Jaguares de Córdoba (loan)	3	(0)
2015	→ New York City FC (loan)	12	(1)
2016	→ América de Cali (loan)	0	(0)
2017	→ Torque (loan)	19	(3)
2019	Destroyers	6	(1)
2021	Boyaca Chico	14	(0)

International career
2010–2011	Colombia U20	5	(0)
- * Club domestic league appearances and goals as of 19:50, 21 October 2019 (UTC)

Javier Calle Estrada (born 29 April 1991) is a Colombian footballer who last played as a midfielder for Colombian club Boyaca Chico.

== Club career ==
Calle began his career with the youth team Independiente Medellín, before graduating to the senior squad in 2009. Calle had a loan spell with América de Cali in 2012 and a further loan spell with Jaguares de Córdoba in 2013. He had his best season with Medellin in 2014 as he scored six goals in 21 league appearances to help his club make the final, which they lost against Santa Fe.

Calle was loaned to MLS club New York City FC on February 6, 2015, for the entirety of the 2015 MLS season. On July 26, against Orlando City SC, he scored his first goal of the season in their 5–3 victory.

== International career ==
Calle played five matches for the Colombia national u-20 team that reached the quarter-finals at the 2011 FIFA U-20 World Cup.
