= Matt Dunn (soccer) =

American professional soccer player

Personal information
- Full name: Matthew Dunn
- Date of birth: January 13, 1994 (age 32)
- Place of birth: Dallas, Texas, United States
- Height: 1.78 m (5 ft 10 in)
- Position: Midfielder

Youth career
- 2006–2007: Grasshoppers
- 2008–2009: FC Dallas
- 2010–2011: 1. FC Köln

College career
Years	Team	Apps	(Gls)
2013	UMFK Bengals	17	(7)

Senior career*
Years	Team	Apps	(Gls)
2012–2013	OFK Beograd	0	(0)
2014	Chivas USA	7	(0)
2015	New York City FC	1	(0)
2015	→ Wilmington Hammerheads (loan)	1	(0)

International career^{‡}
2010–2011	United States U17	18	(1)
2012	United States U18	3	(0)
- * Club domestic league appearances and goals as of April 25, 2015 ‡ National team caps and goals as of July 27, 2014

Matthew Dunn (born January 13, 1994) is an American former professional soccer player.

== Career ==
After spending time with the youth clubs of Grasshopper Club Zürich and FC Dallas, Dunn signed with German club 1. FC Köln, where he spent two years. After his release from Köln, Dunn signed with Serbian side OFK Beograd where he spent 18-months, but didn't make a first-team appearance.

After returning to the United States, Dunn enrolled at the University of Maine at Fort Kent in 2013, where he scored 7 goals in 17 appearances. Dunn left UMFK to enter the MLS Waiver Draft and was selected by Chivas USA on April 17, 2014.

In November 2014, following the contraction of the Chivas USA franchise, Dunn was selected by New York City FC in the 2014 MLS Dispersal Draft.

Dunn was waived by New York City on June 24, 2015. Where he would retire.

Matt Dunn was part of the United States squad at the 2011 FIFA U-17 World Cup.
