= Kwadwo Poku (footballer, born 1992) =

Ghanaian footballer

Personal information
- Date of birth: 19 February 1992 (age 34)
- Place of birth: Kumasi, Ghana
- Height: 1.85 m (6 ft 1 in)
- Position: Attacking midfielder

Youth career
- Asante Kotoko SC

Senior career*
Years	Team	Apps	(Gls)
2011–2013	Georgia Revolution		
2014	Atlanta Silverbacks	25	(2)
2015–2016	New York City	34	(5)
2015	→ Wilmington Hammerheads (loan)	1	(0)
2016–2017	Miami FC	50	(13)
2018	Anzhi Makhachkala	3	(0)
2018–2019	Tampa Bay Rowdies	40	(4)
2020	Europa	4	(0)
2021–	Tennessee Tempo		

International career
2015–2018	Ghana	2	(0)
- * Club domestic league appearances and goals

Kwadwo Poku (born 19 February 1992) is a Ghanaian professional footballer who plays as an attacking midfielder.

== Club career ==
=== Youth ===
Poku played in the youth system of his hometown club, Asante Kotoko S.C., in Kumasi, Ghana.

=== Georgia Revolution ===
In late 2010, Poku moved to the US and joined 4th division side Georgia Revolution ahead of their 2011 season. Playing as a striker in the 2012 and 2013 NPSL seasons Poku was his team's top scorer and in the 2013 season he also contributed a team-high seven assists. In May 2013, he scored a hat-trick in a 4–3 win over Real Colorado Foxes in the first round of the U.S. Open Cup.

=== Atlanta Silverbacks ===
Poku moved to the Atlanta Silverbacks of the NASL on January 24, 2014. During his time at the club he made 25 appearances, scoring twice, including a winning goal in the 91st minute against MLS side Real Salt Lake in the fourth round of the US Open Cup. Silverbacks manager and technical director Eric Wynalda described Poku as one of the best players in NASL, adding that he "might be too good for the MLS too".

=== New York City FC ===
In January 2015, Poku was signed by MLS expansion side New York City FC after they acquired Poku's MLS rights from Seattle Sounders FC in exchange for a 2017 MLS SuperDraft pick. Poku quickly became a fan favourite at New York City for his eye catching performances, he was named to the MLS 24 under 24 at the end of the 2015 season.

=== Miami FC ===
After failing to earn consistent playing time under new coach Patrick Vieira, he was sold to Miami FC of the NASL in late June 2016, for a reported fee of $700,000.

=== Anzhi Makhachkala ===
On 17 January 2018, Poku signed for Russian club FC Anzhi Makhachkala until 31 May 2020.

=== Tampa Bay Rowdies ===
On 26 June 2018, Poku returned to the United States and signed with USL team Tampa Bay Rowdies. He scored his first goal for the team on 25 August 2018 in a 1–2 against FC Cincinnati.

=== Europa ===
On 27 June 2020, Poku signed for Europa FC of Gibraltar.

=== Beaman United & Tennessee Tempo ===
In 2021, Poku co-founded Beaman United FC, an amateur team in Murfreesboro, Tennessee that joined the United Premier Soccer League where he occasionally acted as both player and coach. As of 2025, following the team rebrand to Tennessee Tempo FC, Poku serves as the academy director and head coach of the under-19 team.

== International career ==
During August 2015, Poku showed interest in playing international football for both Ghana and the United States national teams. United States coach Jurgen Klinsmann reportedly approached Poku and asked him to switch nationality following his impressive performance in MLS for New York City FC; however, Poku did not have US citizenship.

On 10 October 2015, Poku received his first call up from Ghana for a friendly against Canada. Poku played 8 minutes after being subbed on in a 1–1 draw.

Poku holds a U.S. green card which also qualifies him as a domestic player for MLS and NASL roster purposes.

== Honours ==
Individual

- NYCFC Etihad Player of the month: August 2015

== Career statistics ==
=== Club ===
As of match played 14 October 2018

Club	Season	League			Cup		Continental		Other		Total	
Club	Season	Division	Apps	Goals	Apps	Goals	Apps	Goals	Apps	Goals	Apps	Goals
Atlanta Silverbacks	2014	NASL	25	2	3	1	–		–		28	3
New York City	2015	MLS	27	4	1	2	–		–		28	6
New York City	2016	MLS	7	1	1	0	–		–		8	1
New York City	Total		34	5	2	2	-	-	-	-	36	7
Wilmington Hammerheads (loan)	2015	USL	1	0	0	0	–		–		1	0
Miami	2016	NASL	20	6	0	0	–		–		20	6
Miami	2017	NASL	30	7	5	2	–		–		35	9
Miami	Total		50	13	5	2	-	-	-	-	55	15
Anzhi Makhachkala	2017–18	Russian Premier League	3	0	0	0	–		1	1	4	1
Tampa Bay Rowdies	2018	USL	16	1	0	0	–		–		16	1
Tampa Bay Rowdies	2019	USL	25	3	2	0	–		–		27	3
Tampa Bay Rowdies	Total		41	4	2	0	-	-	-	-	43	4
Career total			154	24	12	5	0	0	1	1	162	30
