= Kwame Watson-Siriboe =

American soccer player

Personal information
- Full name: Kwame Watson-Siriboe
- Date of birth: November 13, 1986 (age 39)
- Place of birth: Chino Hills, California, United States
- Height: 6 ft 3 in (1.91 m)
- Position: Defender

College career
| Years | Team | Apps | (Gls) |
| 2006–2009 | Connecticut Huskies | 55 | (3) |

Senior career*
| Years | Team | Apps | (Gls) |
| 2006 | Westchester Flames | 1 | (0) |
| 2010–2012 | Chicago Fire | 10 | (0) |
| 2011 | → FC Tampa Bay (loan) | 10 | (0) |
| 2012–2014 | Real Salt Lake | 19 | (0) |
| 2014 | → Orange County Blues (loan) | 4 | (0) |
| 2015 | New York City FC | 12 | (1) |
| 2014 | → Carolina RailHawks (loan) | 6 | (0) |
| 2016 | Orange County Blues | 8 | (0) |
| 2017 | Indy Eleven | 15 | (0) |
| 2018–2019 | KTP | 17 | (1) |
- * Club domestic league appearances and goals as of January 31, 2023

Kwame Watson-Siriboe (born November 13, 1986), is an American retired soccer player.

== Career ==
=== College and amateur ===
Watson-Siriboe attended Canyon High School and played club soccer with the Pateadores Soccer Club before playing college soccer at the University of Connecticut. Watson-Siriboe appeared in over 60 games for the Huskies, scoring three goals as a senior in 2009. He was awarded the Eric S. Lund Award for the team's most improved player in 2007, and was named the 2009 Big East Co-Defender of the Year.

During his college years he also played one game for the Westchester Flames in the USL Premier Development League.

=== Professional ===
Watson-Siriboe was drafted in the second round (26th overall) of the 2010 MLS SuperDraft by Chicago Fire. He made his professional debut on April 3, 2010, in a game against Colorado Rapids.

On June 3, 2011, Watson-Siriboe was loaned to FC Tampa Bay in the North American Soccer League for the remainder of the 2011 season. He made his debut for Tampa on June 4, in a 2–1 loss to the Carolina RailHawks. Watson-Siriboe returned to Chicago at the conclusion of the 2011 NASL season.

Watson-Siriboe was traded to Real Salt Lake on June 27, 2012, in exchange for a fourth-round 2014 MLS SuperDraft pick.

On August 11, 2014, Watson-Siriboe was traded to New York City FC in exchange for a fourth-round 2016 MLS SuperDraft pick.

After his release from New York City FC, Watson-Siriboe was placed in the 2015 MLS Re-Entry Draft.

On August 6, 2016, Watson-Siriboe signed with United Soccer League side Orange County Blues.

On February 3, 2017, Watson-Siriboe signed for North American Soccer League side Indy Eleven.

In April 2018, Watson-Siriboe joined KTP in Ykkönen.

=== International ===
Watson-Siriboe was a member of the United States' U18 national team that traveled to Argentina in 2004.
