= Mehdi Ballouchy =

Moroccan footballer (born 1983)

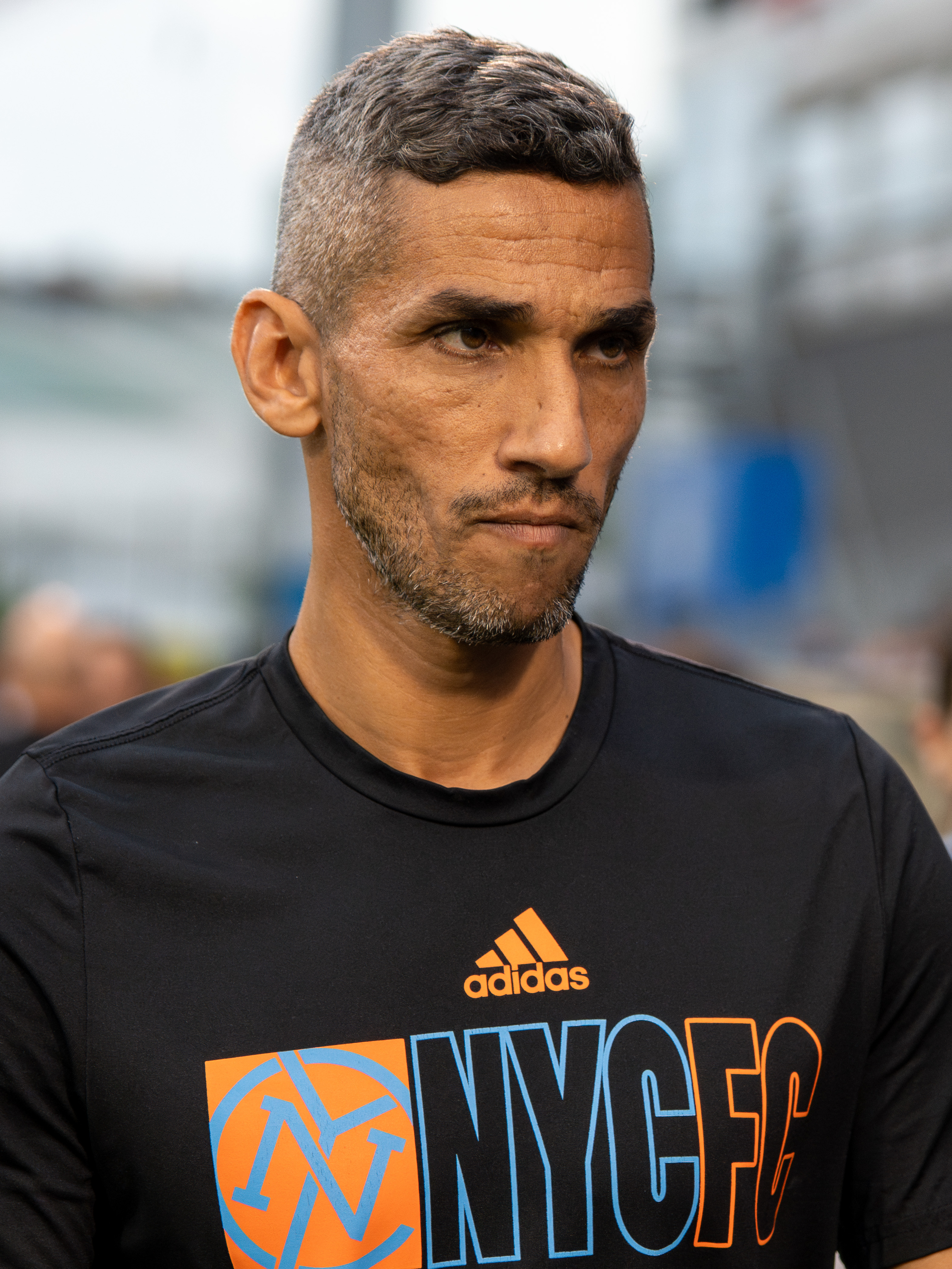

Personal information
- Full name: Mehdi Ballouchy
- Date of birth: April 6, 1983 (age 43)
- Place of birth: Casablanca, Morocco
- Height: 5 ft 11 in (1.80 m)
- Position: Midfielder

Youth career
- 1996–1999: SCC Mohammédia

College career
Years	Team	Apps	(Gls)
2002	Creighton Bluejays		
2003–2005	Santa Clara Broncos		

Senior career*
Years	Team	Apps	(Gls)
2005	Boulder Rapids Reserve	2	(0)
2006–2007	Real Salt Lake	46	(2)
2007–2010	Colorado Rapids	77	(7)
2010–2012	New York Red Bulls	51	(4)
2012–2013	San Jose Earthquakes	11	(0)
2014	Vancouver Whitecaps FC	7	(0)
2014	→ Vancouver Whitecaps FC U-23 (loan)	1	(0)
2015–2016	New York City FC	24	(3)
Total		218	(16)

International career
1999	Morocco U16	3	(0)
2000	Morocco U17	6	(2)
- * Club domestic league appearances and goals as of June 5, 2017

Mehdi Ballouchy (Arabic: مهدي بلوشي; born April 6, 1983) is a Moroccan retired professional footballer who played as a midfielder. He is currently one of the coaching staff for New York City FC.

== Career ==
=== Early life ===
At the age of 13, he joined SCC Mohammédia and played there to the age of 16. He then moved to the United States in 2000, initially living with his brother in Denver before attending Gunn High School in Palo Alto, California with a host family. He attended college and played one year of college soccer at Creighton and two at Santa Clara, where he was named first team all-American in 2005. He also briefly played with Boulder Rapids Reserve in the USL Premier Development League.

== Professional ==
=== Real Salt Lake ===
Ballouchy signed a Generation Adidas contract with MLS and was taken second overall by Real Salt Lake at the 2006 MLS SuperDraft. During his time with RSL Ballouchy appeared in 46 league matches scoring 2 goals and recording 2 assists.

=== Colorado Rapids ===
After spending two years in Utah he was traded to Colorado Rapids for Kyle Beckerman in July 2007. During his stay with Colorado Ballouchy played primarily as an attacking central midfielder, but also saw time at right midfield. With Colorado he appeared in 77 league matches, scoring 7 goals and recording 18 assists. His most productive season for Colorado was in 2009 when he appeared in 28 league matches scoring two goals and providing seven assists.

=== New York Red Bulls ===
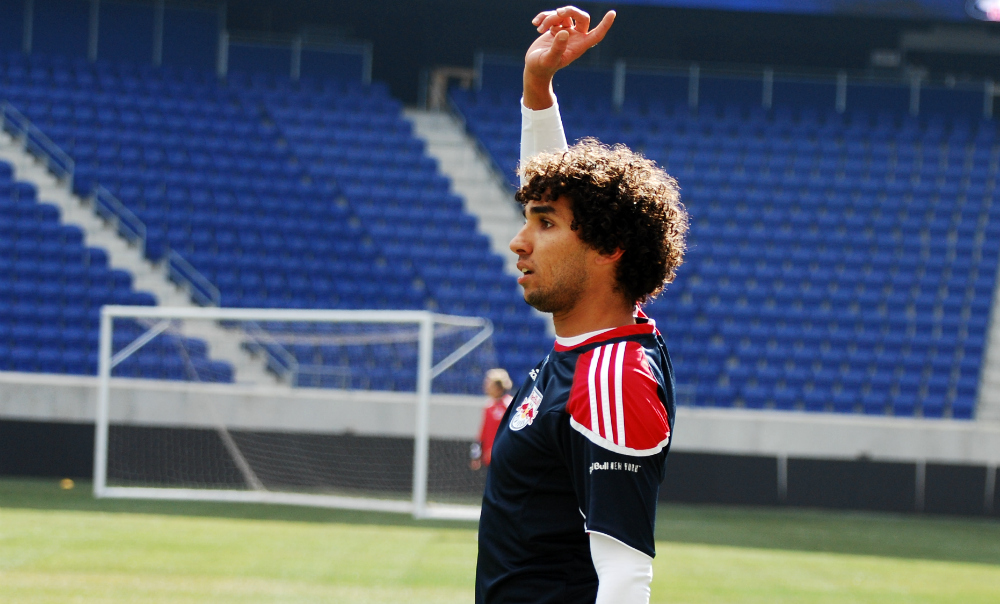
Ballouchy pictured during his time at New York Red Bulls.

On September 14, 2010, Ballouchy joined New York Red Bulls in a trade for Macoumba Kandji. New York coach Hans Backe had been looking for an attacking midfielder throughout the season and the acquisition of Ballouchy ended the club's search. On September 16, 2010, Ballouchy debuted for New York wearing the number 10 shirt and scoring a goal in a 2–2 draw against FC Dallas. On October 21, 2010, Ballouchy started for Red Bulls in a 2–0 victory over New England Revolution which helped New York clinch its second regular season Eastern Conference title. On October 26, 2011, Ballouchy helped New York to a 2–0 victory over FC Dallas at Pizza Hut Park in a 2011 MLS Cup Playoffs match by assisting Joel Lindpere in scoring the club's first goal of the night.

=== San Jose Earthquakes ===
Ballouchy moved back to California as he was traded to San Jose Earthquakes on July 30, 2012, for a 2013 international spot and a conditional 2013 MLS Supplemental Draft pick. He made 6 appearances as a regular before he suffered from tearing of his anterior cruciate ligaments which kept him sideline for the rest of the season and the start of the following season.

=== Vancouver Whitecaps FC ===
Ballouchy was selected in the second stage of the 2013 MLS Re-Entry Draft by the Vancouver Whitecaps FC on December 18, 2013 and agreed to terms in January 2014.

=== New York City FC ===
New York City FC selected Medhi Ballouchy as their sixth selection in the 2014 MLS Expansion Draft on December 10, 2014. He was Given number 20 shirt.

Ballouchy announced his retirement on November 18, 2016. After working as a coach at the New York City academy he was promoted to first team assistant coach under Ronny Deila in January 2020.

== International career ==
Ballouchy has played for various youth Moroccan national teams, including the Moroccan U-17 and U-16 national teams prior to moving to the United States at the age of 16. He wasn't called to play for the Morocco national football team at senior level.

== Personal life ==
The son of Driss and Malika Ballouchy, his father is a former French second division football player. Ballouchy received a U.S. green card in January 2013, which qualifies him as a domestic player for MLS purposes.

== Career statistics ==
As of match played May 18, 2016

Season	Club	Country	Level	Apps	Goals
2006	Real Salt Lake	(United States)	I	32	2
2007	Real Salt Lake	(United States)	I	14	0
2007	Colorado Rapids	(United States)	I	9	1
2008	Colorado Rapids	(United States)	I	19	1
2009	Colorado Rapids	(United States)	I	28	2
2010	Colorado Rapids	(United States)	I	21	3
2010	New York Red Bulls	(United States)	I	6	1
2011	New York Red Bulls	(United States)	I	29	2
2012	New York Red Bulls	(United States)	I	16	1
2012	San Jose Earthquakes	(United States)	I	6	0
2013	San Jose Earthquakes	(United States)	I	5	0
2014	Vancouver Whitecaps FC	(Canada)	I	7	0
2015	New York City FC	(United States)	I	19	3
2016	New York City FC	(United States)	I	5	0

== Honors ==
New York Red Bulls

- MLS Eastern Conference 2010

=== Individual ===
- NYCFC Etihad Player of the month — May 2015
