= 2016–17 Manchester City F.C. season =

English football club season

Manchester City
2016–17 season
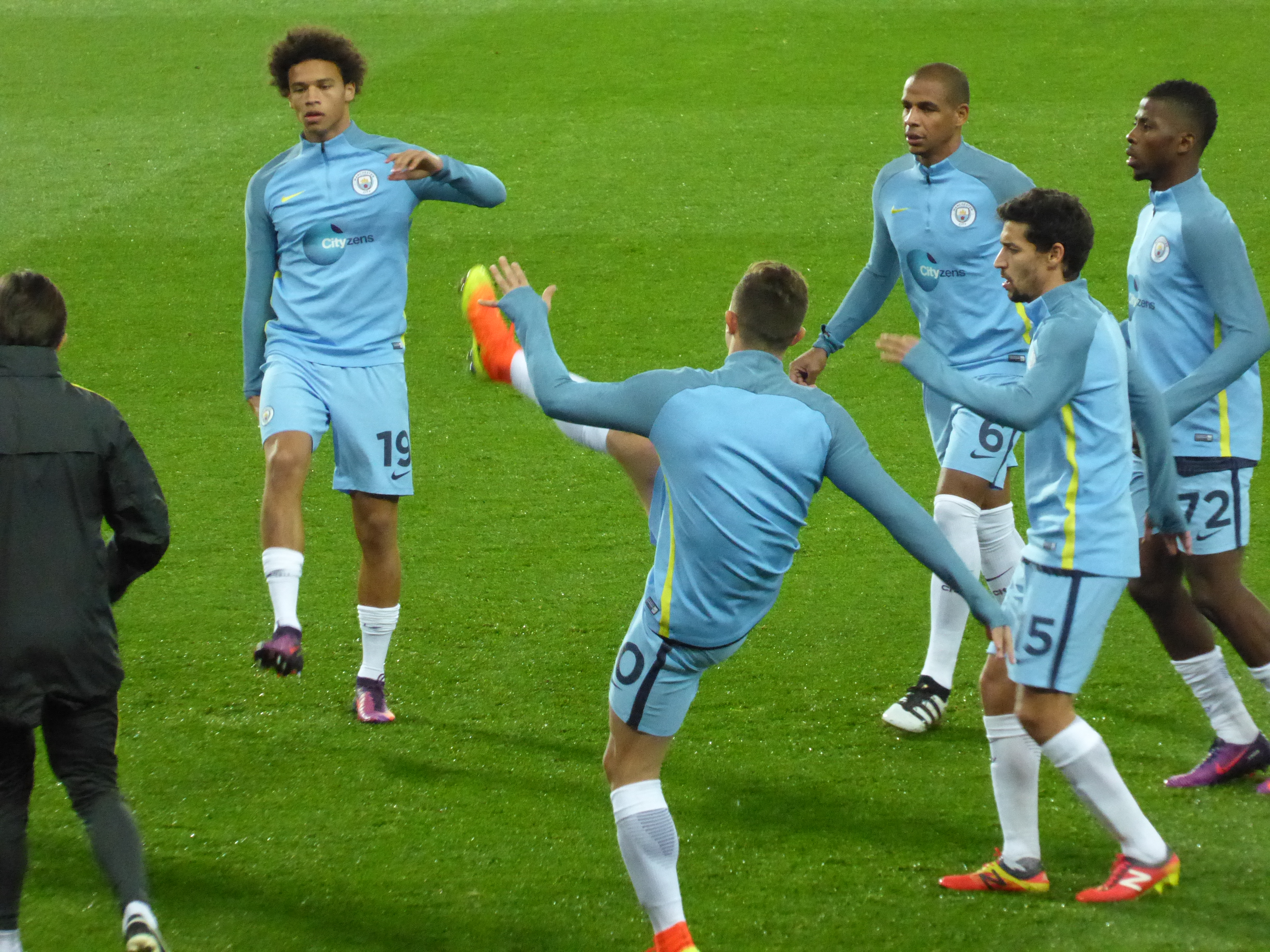
- Manchester City players warming up before the Manchester derby in the EFL Cup, 26 October 2016
- Owner: City Football Group
- Chairman: Khaldoon Al Mubarak
- Manager: Pep Guardiola
- Stadium: Etihad Stadium
- Premier League: 3rd
- FA Cup: Semi-finals
- EFL Cup: Fourth round
- UEFA Champions League: Round of 16
- Top goalscorer: League: Sergio Agüero (20); All: Sergio Agüero (33)
- Highest home attendance: 54,512 vs Everton, 15 October 2016, Premier League
- Lowest home attendance: 30,270 vs Borussia Mönchengladbach, 14 September 2016, Champions League
- Average home league attendance: 54,019
Home colours	Away colours	Third colours

The 2016–17 season was Manchester City Football Club's 115th season of competitive football, 88th season in the top flight of English football and 20th season in the Premier League. Along with the league, the club also competed in the UEFA Champions League (for the sixth year in a row), FA Cup and League Cup. The season covered the period from 1 July 2016 to 30 June 2017.

== Club "brand update" ==
In conjunction with the recruitment of Pep Guardiola, the manager whom City's executives had sought to hire since they joined the club four years previously and the man synonymous with the style of football they wanted the club to espouse, Manchester City announced a series of adjustments to the club's "brand" prior to the start of the season.

On 15 October 2015, the club announced that they intended to enter into a consultation with their fans over the designing of a new badge to replace the design that had been brought in 1997 and which had largely been unpopular since. The result of the online-based consultation was a design bearing many of the hallmarks of the crest replaced in 1997, plus some elements of the style established by the other club badges of fellow City Football Group teams Melbourne City FC and New York City FC. While many praised the logo for its simplicity and similarity to the beloved previous design, it was criticised from other corners for its slightly amateurish appearance, its removal of the words "Football Club" and for its failure to more closely replicate the earlier badge.

On 30 June 2016, the club unexpectedly announced the renaming of their Twitter accounts and website. Replacing the old "branding" of MCFC (the initials of the club), both social media outlets were rechristened "ManCity". While the move was popular among many, especially the club's more recent foreign fans for whom the styling was already their preferred abbreviation of the club's name, the change provoked another mixed reaction from the Manchester-based core supporter base, with many criticising the decision to use a wording often used by the club's rivals, as well as highlighting the decision to again remove the "Football Club" wording.

== Friendlies ==
=== Pre-season ===
On 20 July 2016, Manchester City began their pre-season with a 0–1 defeat against Bayern Munich. Due to bad weather during the International Champions Cup, the derby against Manchester United was cancelled, and City went on to play Borussia Dortmund in their next cup match, which they would go on to win 6–5 on penalties after drawing 1–1 at the end of regular time. A match was played on 7 August against Arsenal in the 2016 Supermatchen, which ended 3–2 to Arsenal. To replace the game against Manchester United, which was cancelled, City arranged a friendly against St Johnstone, which was played behind closed doors.

==== Friendly ====
20 July 2016 Friendly	Bayern Munich	1–0	Manchester City	Munich, Germany
19:30 GMT	Öztürk 76'	Report		Stadium: Allianz Arena; Attendance: 68,000; Referee: Pavel Královec (Czech Republic)

3 August 2016 Friendly	Manchester City	3–0	St Johnstone	Manchester
	Fernandinho; Silva; Delph			Stadium: Academy Stadium; Attendance: 0 (behind closed doors)

==== 2016 International Champions Cup ====
25 July 2016 ICC	Manchester City	Cancelled	Manchester United	Beijing, China
19:30 CST				Stadium: National Stadium; Referee: Ma Ning (China)
Note: The match, a Manchester derby, was cancelled due to adverse weather and poor pitch conditions.

28 July 2016 ICC	Borussia Dortmund	1–1 (5–6 p)	Manchester City	Shenzhen, China
19:30 CST	Pulisic 90+6'	Report	Agüero 79'	Stadium: Longgang Stadium; Attendance: 32,008; Referee: Fu Ming (China)
	Penalties
	Passlack (penalty missed); Kagawa (penalty scored); Castro (penalty scored); Burnić (penalty scored); Pulisic (penalty scored); Hober (penalty scored); Bruun Larsen (penalty missed); Merino (penalty missed)		(penalty missed) García; (penalty scored) Adarabioyo; (penalty scored) Fernandinho; (penalty scored) Silva; (penalty scored) Agüero; (penalty scored) Nolito; (penalty missed) Sterling; (penalty scored) Angeliño

==== 2016 Super Match ====
7 August 2016 Super Match	Manchester City	2–3	Arsenal	Gothenburg, Sweden
17:00 CEST	Fernando (yellow card) 2'; Agüero 30', (yellow card) 55'; Iheanacho 88'	Report	Iwobi 50'; Walcott 73'; Akpom 85'	Stadium: Ullevi; Referee: Martin Strombergsson (Sweden)

== Competitions ==
=== Overall ===
Competition	Started round	Final position / round	First match	Last match
Premier League	—	3rd	13 August 2016	21 May 2017
FA Cup	Third round	Semi-finals	6 January 2017	23 April 2017
League Cup	Third round	Fourth round	21 September 2016	26 October 2016
UEFA Champions League	Play-off round	Round of 16	16 August 2016	5 April 2017

Source: Competitions

=== Premier League ===
==== League table ====
Pos	Team	Pld	W	D	L	GF	GA	GD	Pts	Qualification or relegation
1	Chelsea (C)	38	30	3	5	85	33	+52	93	Qualification for the Champions League group stage
2	Tottenham Hotspur	38	26	8	4	86	26	+60	86	Qualification for the Champions League group stage
3	Manchester City	38	23	9	6	80	39	+41	78	Qualification for the Champions League group stage
4	Liverpool	38	22	10	6	78	42	+36	76	Qualification for the Champions League play-off round
5	Arsenal	38	23	6	9	77	44	+33	75	Qualification for the Europa League group stage (Note: Arsenal qualified for the Europa League group stage by winning the 2016–17 FA Cup. As they had also qualified there by the virtue of their league position (5th), this spot was passed to the next-highest ranked team (6th), Manchester United.)

Source: Premier League
Rules for classification: 1) Points; 2) Goal difference; 3) Goals scored; 4) Play-offs (only if needed to decide champion, teams for relegation or teams for UEFA competitions).
(C) Champions

==== Results summary ====
Overall								Home						Away					
Pld	W	D	L	GF	GA	GD	Pts	W	D	L	GF	GA	GD	W	D	L	GF	GA	GD
38	23	9	6	80	39	+41	78	11	7	1	37	17	+20	12	2	5	43	22	+21

Last updated: 21 May 2017.
Source: Premier League

==== Results by matchday ====
Matchday	1	2	3	4	5	6	7	8	9	10	11	12	13	14	15	16	17	18	19	20	21	22	23	24	25	26	27	28	29	30	31	32	33	34	35	36	37	38
Ground	H	A	H	A	H	A	A	H	H	A	H	A	A	H	A	H	H	A	A	H	A	H	A	H	A	A	H	H	A	A	H	A	H	A	H	H	H	A
Result	W	W	W	W	W	W	L	D	D	W	D	W	W	L	L	W	W	W	L	W	L	D	W	W	W	W	D	D	D	L	W	W	D	D	W	W	W	W
Position	5	1	1	1	1	1	1	1	1	1	2	2	3	4	4	4	2	2	3	3	5	5	5	3	2	3	3	3	4	4	4	4	4	4	3	3	3	3

Updated to match(es) played on 21 May 2017. Source: Statto.com
A = Away; H = Home; W = Win; D = Draw; L = Loss

==== Matches ====
38 matches were played, two against each other team in the league; one at home and one away.

13 August 2016 1	Manchester City	2–1	Sunderland	Manchester
17:30 BST	Agüero 4' (pen.); McNair 87' (o.g.); Kolarov (yellow card) 90+1'	Report	Gooch (yellow card) 42'; Love (yellow card) 67'; Defoe 71'	Stadium: City of Manchester Stadium; Attendance: 54,362; Referee: Robert Madley

20 August 2016 2	Stoke City	1–4	Manchester City	Stoke-on-Trent
12:30 BST	Shawcross (yellow card) 26'; Bojan (yellow card) 45', (goal) 49' (pen.); Allen (yellow card) 71'	Report	Agüero 27' (pen.), 36'; Zabaleta (yellow card) 48'; Sterling (yellow card) 49'; De Bruyne (yellow card) 66'; Nolito 86', 90+5'; Stones (yellow card) 90+3'	Stadium: Bet365 Stadium; Attendance: 27,455; Referee: Mike Dean

28 August 2016 3	Manchester City	3–1	West Ham United	Manchester
16:00 BST	Fernandinho (yellow card) 6', (goal) 18'; Sterling 7', 90+2'	Report	Masuaku (yellow card) 14'; Fletcher (yellow card) 48'; Noble (yellow card) 51'; Antonio 58'	Stadium: City of Manchester Stadium; Attendance: 54,008; Referee: Andre Marriner

10 September 2016 4	Manchester United	1–2	Manchester City	Manchester
12:30 BST	Ibrahimović 42', (yellow card) 51'; Bailly (yellow card) 45+1'; Fellaini (yellow card) 52'; Rooney (yellow card) 83'	Report	De Bruyne 15'; Iheanacho 36'; Silva (yellow card) 41'; Fernandinho (yellow card) 90+5'	Stadium: Old Trafford; Attendance: 75,272; Referee: Mark Clattenburg

17 September 2016 5	Manchester City	4–0	Bournemouth	Manchester
15:00 BST	De Bruyne 15'; Otamendi (yellow card) 24'; Iheanacho 25'; Sterling 48'; Gündoğan 66'; Nolito (red card) 86'	Report	A. Smith (yellow card) 86'	Stadium: City of Manchester Stadium; Attendance: 54,335; Referee: Jonathan Moss

24 September 2016 6	Swansea City	1–3	Manchester City	Swansea
15:00 BST	Llorente 13'; Amat (yellow card) 58'; Van der Hoorn (yellow card) 64'	Report	Agüero 9', 65' (pen.); Sagna (yellow card) 31'; Silva (yellow card) 37'; Sterling 77', (yellow card) 77'; Kolarov (yellow card) 88'	Stadium: Liberty Stadium; Attendance: 20,786; Referee: Neil Swarbrick

2 October 2016 7	Tottenham Hotspur	2–0	Manchester City	Tottenham, London
14:15 BST	Kolarov 9' (o.g.); Wanyama (yellow card) 30'; Alli 37'; Rose (yellow card) 42'; Lamela (penalty missed) 65'	Report	Otamendi (yellow card) 20'; Sterling (yellow card) 56'	Stadium: White Hart Lane; Attendance: 31,793; Referee: Andre Marriner

15 October 2016 8	Manchester City	1–1	Everton	Manchester
15:00 BST	De Bruyne (penalty missed) 43'; Agüero (penalty missed) 70'; Nolito 72'	Report	Lukaku 64'; Coleman (yellow card) 81'; Williams (yellow card) 85'	Stadium: City of Manchester Stadium; Attendance: 54,512; Referee: Michael Oliver

23 October 2016 9	Manchester City	1–1	Southampton	Manchester
13:30 BST	Kolarov (yellow card) 50'; Iheanacho 27'; Kompany (yellow card) 57'; Agüero (yellow card) 59'	Report	Redmond 55'; Clasie (yellow card) 44'; Romeu (yellow card) 52'; Forster (yellow card) 90+2'	Stadium: City of Manchester Stadium; Attendance: 53,731; Referee: Mark Clattenburg

29 October 2016 10	West Bromwich Albion	0–4	Manchester City	West Bromwich
15:00 BST	Dawson (yellow card) 16'; Olsson (yellow card) 21'; Morrison (yellow card) 53'; McClean (yellow card) 56'	Report	Nolito (yellow card) 15'; Agüero 19', 28'; Kolarov (yellow card) 62'; Fernando (yellow card) 76'; Gündoğan 79', 90'	Stadium: The Hawthorns; Attendance: 22,470; Referee: Lee Mason

5 November 2016 11	Manchester City	1–1	Middlesbrough	Manchester
15:00 BST	Agüero 43', (yellow card) 88'	Report	Forshaw (yellow card) 20'; Clayton (yellow card) 52'; De Roon (yellow card) 89', (goal) 90+1'	Stadium: City of Manchester Stadium; Attendance: 54,294; Referee: Kevin Friend

19 November 2016 12	Crystal Palace	1–2	Manchester City	Selhurst, London
15:00 GMT	Wickham 66', (yellow card) 79'	Report	Touré 39', 83'; Otamendi (yellow card) 62'; Nolito (yellow card) 62'	Stadium: Selhurst Park; Attendance: 25,529; Referee: Robert Madley

26 November 2016 13	Burnley	1–2	Manchester City	Burnley
12:30 GMT	Marney 14', (yellow card) 34'; Lowton (yellow card) 66'	Report	Agüero 37', 60', (yellow card) 70'; Otamendi (yellow card) 45+3'; Nolito (yellow card) 74'	Stadium: Turf Moor; Attendance: 21,794; Referee: Andre Marriner

3 December 2016 14	Manchester City	1–3	Chelsea	Manchester
12:30 GMT	Otamendi (yellow card) 17'; Cahill 45' (o.g.); Navas (yellow card) 81'; Agüero (red card) 90+6'; Fernandinho (red card) 90+7'	Report	Kanté (yellow card) 49'; Costa 60'; Willian 70'; Hazard 90'; Chalobah (yellow card) 90+8'; Fàbregas (yellow card) 90+8'	Stadium: City of Manchester Stadium; Attendance: 54,457; Referee: Anthony Taylor

10 December 2016 15	Leicester City	4–2	Manchester City	Leicester
17:30 GMT	Vardy 3', 20', 78'; King 5'; Simpson (yellow card) 19'; Mahrez (yellow card) 57'; Okazaki (yellow card) 90+2'	Report	Fernando (yellow card) 67'; Kolarov 82'; Nolito 90'	Stadium: King Power Stadium; Attendance: 31,966; Referee: Michael Oliver

14 December 2016 16	Manchester City	2–0	Watford	Manchester
20:00 GMT	Zabaleta 33', (yellow card) 75'; Silva 86'	Report	Prödl (yellow card) 21'; Capoue (yellow card) 73'	Stadium: City of Manchester Stadium; Attendance: 51,527; Referee: Kevin Friend

18 December 2016 17	Manchester City	2–1	Arsenal	Manchester
16:00 GMT	Silva (yellow card) 38'; Sané 47'; Touré (yellow card) 51'; Sterling 71'; De Bruyne (yellow card) 80'; Fernando (yellow card) 90+5'	Report	Walcott 5'; Elneny (yellow card) 88'; Gabriel (yellow card) 90+4'	Stadium: City of Manchester Stadium; Attendance: 54,409; Referee: Martin Atkinson

26 December 2016 18	Hull City	0–3	Manchester City	Hull
17:15 GMT	Mason (yellow card) 82'	Report	Touré 72' (pen.); Iheanacho 78'; Davies 90+4' (o.g.)	Stadium: KCOM Stadium; Attendance: 23,134; Referee: Robert Madley

31 December 2016 19	Liverpool	1–0	Manchester City	Liverpool
17:30 GMT	Klavan (yellow card) 7'; Wijnaldum 8'; Can (yellow card) 75'	Report	Otamendi (yellow card) 90+3'	Stadium: Anfield; Attendance: 53,120; Referee: Craig Pawson

2 January 2017 20	Manchester City	2–1	Burnley	Manchester
15:00 GMT	Fernandinho (red card) 32'; Touré (yellow card) 41'; Clichy 58'; Agüero 62'; Sagna (yellow card) 71'; Kolarov (yellow card) 71'; Silva (yellow card) 90+6'	Report	Hendrick (yellow card) 38'; Mee 70'; Keane (yellow card) 80'; Gray (yellow card) 90+3'	Stadium: City of Manchester Stadium; Attendance: 54,463; Referee: Lee Mason

15 January 2017 21	Everton	4–0	Manchester City	Liverpool
13:30 GMT	Lukaku 34', (yellow card) 90+2'; Mirallas 47'; Holgate (yellow card) 55'; Davies 79'; Lookman 90+4'	Report	Silva (yellow card) 75'; Otamendi (yellow card) 90+2'	Stadium: Goodison Park; Attendance: 39,588; Referee: Mark Clattenburg

21 January 2017 22	Manchester City	2–2	Tottenham Hotspur	Manchester
17:30 GMT	Kolarov (yellow card) 45+2'; Sané 49'; Otamendi (yellow card) 52'; De Bruyne 54'	Report	Wimmer (yellow card) 12'; Dier (yellow card) 13'; Alli (yellow card) 51', (goal) 58'; Son 77'; Wanyama (yellow card) 87'	Stadium: City of Manchester Stadium; Attendance: 54,402; Referee: Andre Marriner

1 February 2017 23	West Ham United	0–4	Manchester City	Stratford, London
19:45 GMT	Obiang (yellow card) 19'; Lanzini (yellow card) 24'; Carroll (yellow card) 71'	Report	De Bruyne 17', (yellow card) 44'; Gabriel Jesus (yellow card) 19', (goal) 39'; Silva 21'; Sterling (yellow card) 60'; Touré 67' (pen.)	Stadium: London Stadium; Attendance: 56,980; Referee: Kevin Friend

5 February 2017 24	Manchester City	2–1	Swansea City	Manchester
13:30 GMT	Gabriel Jesus 11', 90+2'; De Bruyne (yellow card) 42'; Sterling (yellow card) 44'	Report	Llorente (yellow card) 60'; Cork (yellow card) 75'; Sigurðsson 81'	Stadium: City of Manchester Stadium; Attendance: 54,065; Referee: Mike Dean

13 February 2017 25	Bournemouth	0–2	Manchester City	Bournemouth
20:00 GMT	Fraser (yellow card) 26'; Arter (yellow card) 68'	Report	Touré (yellow card) 10'; Sterling 29', (yellow card) 57'; Sané (yellow card) 64'; Mings 69' (o.g.)	Stadium: Vitality Stadium; Attendance: 11,129; Referee: Neil Swarbrick

5 March 2017 26	Sunderland	0–2	Manchester City	Sunderland
16:00 GMT	O'Shea (yellow card) 32'	Report	Agüero 42'; Sané 59'	Stadium: Stadium of Light; Attendance: 41,107; Referee: Martin Atkinson

8 March 2017 27	Manchester City	0–0	Stoke City	Manchester
20:00 GMT	Sané (yellow card) 54'	Report	Bradsley (yellow card) 24'; Walters (yellow card) 84'; Sobhi (yellow card) 90'	Stadium: City of Manchester Stadium; Attendance: 52,625; Referee: Neil Swarbrick

19 March 2017 28	Manchester City	1–1	Liverpool	Manchester
17:30 GMT	Touré (yellow card) 22'; Clichy (yellow card) 50'; Silva (yellow card) 50'; Agüero 69'	Report	Firmino (yellow card) 16'; Matip (yellow card) 43'; Milner 51' (pen.); Mané (yellow card) 89'	Stadium: City of Manchester Stadium; Attendance: 54,449; Referee: Michael Oliver

2 April 2017 29	Arsenal	2–2	Manchester City	Holloway, London
16:00 BST	Coquelin (yellow card) 15'; Xhaka (yellow card) 32'; Walcott 40'; Mustafi 53', (yellow card) 61'	Report	Sané 5'; Navas (yellow card) 8'; Agüero 42'; Fernandinho (yellow card) 47'	Stadium: Emirates Stadium; Attendance: 60,001; Referee: Andre Marriner

5 April 2017 30	Chelsea	2–1	Manchester City	Fulham, London
20:00 BST	Hazard 10', 35'; Kanté (yellow card) 90+3'	Report	Agüero 26'; Clichy (yellow card) 52'; Delph (yellow card) 77'; Kompany (yellow card) 83'	Stadium: Stamford Bridge; Attendance: 41,528; Referee: Mike Dean

8 April 2017 31	Manchester City	3–1	Hull City	Manchester
15:00 BST	Elmohamady 31' (o.g.); Agüero 48'; Delph 64'	Report	Evandro (yellow card) 28'; N'Diaye (yellow card) 69'; Ranocchia 85'	Stadium: City of Manchester Stadium; Attendance: 54,393; Referee: Jonathan Moss

15 April 2017 32	Southampton	0–3	Manchester City	Southampton
17:30 BST	Højbjerg (yellow card) 31'; Davis (yellow card) 37'; Cédric (yellow card) 41'	Report	Kompany 55'; Sané 77'; Agüero 80'	Stadium: St.Mary's; Attendance: 31,850; Referee: Neil Swarbrick

27 April 2017 33	Manchester City	0–0	Manchester United	Manchester
20:00 BST	Gabriel Jesus (yellow card) 89'	Report	Fellaini (yellow card) 83' (red card) 84'	Stadium: City of Manchester Stadium; Attendance: 54,176; Referee: Martin Atkinson

30 April 2017 34	Middlesbrough	2–2	Manchester City	Middlesbrough
14:05 BST	Stuani (yellow card) 16'; Negredo 38'; Forshaw (yellow card) 54'; Fábio (yellow card) 67'; De Roon (yellow card) 68'; Chambers 78'	Report	Kompany (yellow card) 31'; Sané (yellow card) 68'; Agüero 69' (pen.); Otamendi (yellow card) 76'; Sterling (yellow card) 81'; Gabriel Jesus 85'	Stadium: Riverside Stadium; Attendance: 29,763; Referee: Kevin Friend

6 May 2017 35	Manchester City	5–0	Crystal Palace	Manchester
12:30 BST	Silva 2'; Kompany (yellow card) 33', (goal) 49'; De Bruyne 60'; Sterling 82'; Otamendi 90+2'	Report	Kelly (yellow card) 4'; Milivojević (yellow card) 52'; Delaney (yellow card) 90+2'	Stadium: City of Manchester Stadium; Attendance: 54,119; Referee: Michael Oliver

13 May 2017 36	Manchester City	2–1	Leicester City	Manchester
12:30 BST	Silva 29', (yellow card) 90+9'; Gabriel Jesus 36' (pen.); Kompany (yellow card) 50'; Agüero (yellow card) 84'	Report	Benalouane (yellow card) 35'; Okazaki 42'; Fuchs (yellow card) 72'; Mahrez (penalty missed) 77'; Albrighton (yellow card) 80'	Stadium: City of Manchester Stadium; Attendance: 54,407; Referee: Bobby Madley

16 May 2017 37	Manchester City	3–1	West Bromwich Albion	Manchester
20:00 BST	Gabriel Jesus 27'; De Bruyne 29'; Touré 57'; Sané (yellow card) 70'	Report	Chadli (yellow card) 51'; Dawson (yellow card) 52'; Robson-Kanu 87'	Stadium: City of Manchester Stadium; Attendance: 53,624; Referee: Craig Pawson

21 May 2017 38	Watford	0–5	Manchester City	Watford
15:00 BST	Doucouré (yellow card) 45+1'	Report	Kompany 5'; Agüero 23', 36'; Fernandinho 41'; Gabriel Jesus 58'	Stadium: Vicarage Road; Attendance: 20,829; Referee: Jonathan Moss

=== FA Cup ===
As a Premier League club, Manchester City entered the competition in the third round proper, drawing West Ham United away from home.

6 January 2017 Third round	West Ham United	0–5	Manchester City	Stratford, London
19:55 GMT		Report	Touré 33' (pen.); Nordtveit 41' (o.g.); Silva 43'; Agüero 50'; Stones 84'	Stadium: London Stadium; Attendance: 56,975; Referee: Michael Oliver

28 January 2017 Fourth round	Crystal Palace	0–3	Manchester City	Selhurst, London
15:00 GMT	Mutch (yellow card) 30'; Kelly (yellow card) 54'; Ledley (yellow card) 90'	Report	Touré (yellow card) 28', (goal) 90+2'; Sterling (yellow card) 36', (goal) 43'; Sagna (yellow card) 56'; Sané 71'	Stadium: Selhurst Park; Attendance: 13,979; Referee: Mike Jones

18 February 2017 Fifth round	Huddersfield Town	0–0	Manchester City	Huddersfield
15:00 GMT		Report	Kolarov (yellow card) 25'	Stadium: John Smith's Stadium; Attendance: 24,129; Referee: Anthony Taylor

1 March 2017 Fifth round replay	Manchester City	5–1	Huddersfield Town	Manchester
19:45 GMT	Sané 30'; Agüero 35' (pen.), 74'; Zabaleta 38'; Iheanacho 90+1'	Report	Bunn 7'; Hudson (yellow card) 15'; Stanković (yellow card) 34'	Stadium: City of Manchester Stadium; Attendance: 42,425; Referee: Paul Tierney

11 March 2017 Quarter-final	Middlesbrough	0–2	Manchester City	Middlesbrough
12:15 GMT	Barragán (yellow card) 17'; Leadbitter (yellow card) 45'; Traoré (yellow card) 45+3'	Report	Silva 3'; Agüero 67'	Stadium: Riverside Stadium; Attendance: 32,228; Referee: Mike Dean

23 April 2017 Semi-final	Arsenal	2–1 (a.e.t.)	Manchester City	Wembley, London
15:00 BST	Sánchez (yellow card) 25', (goal) 101'; Monreal 72'; Xhaka (yellow card) 111'	Report	Agüero 62'; Fernandinho (yellow card) 69'; De Bruyne (yellow card) 89'; Sané (yellow card) 102'; Delph (yellow card) 105'; Otamendi (yellow card) 115'	Stadium: Wembley Stadium; Attendance: 85,725; Referee: Craig Pawson

=== League Cup ===
As a club participating in European competition, Manchester City entered the competition in the third round, drawing Swansea City away from home.

21 September 2016 Third round	Swansea City	1–2	Manchester City	Swansea
19:45 BST	Naughton (yellow card) 55'; Sigurðsson 90+3'	Report	Clichy 49'; García 68'; Fernando (yellow card) 87'	Stadium: Liberty Stadium; Attendance: 18,237; Referee: Keith Stroud

26 October 2016 Fourth round	Manchester United	1–0	Manchester City	Manchester
20:00 BST	Valencia (yellow card) 26'; Mata 54'; Pogba (yellow card) 90+1'; Ibrahimović (yellow card) 90+1'	Report	Iheanacho (yellow card) 14'	Stadium: Old Trafford; Attendance: 75,196; Referee: Mike Dean

=== UEFA Champions League ===
In the first season under the reign of Pep Guardiola, hopes were high for Manchester City as they progressed to the knockout phase after finishing second in the group that featured Guardiola's former team, Barcelona. City lost their away match to Barça 0–4, but then rebounded to win 3–1 at home. In the round of 16, the Blues were drawn with Monaco and were expected to progress to the quarter-finals. City were trailing 1–2 and 2–3 in their home match before scoring three unanswered goals and winning 5–3. In the away game, the Cityzens were down 0–2 when Leroy Sané scored and seemingly brought the ticket to the quarter-finals to Man City; however, Tiémoué Bakayoko's late goal meant that Monaco progressed further and City were eliminated.

==== Play-off round ====
The draw for the Champions League play-off round took place on 5 August 2016. Manchester City were a seeded team in the league path, and they were drawn against Steaua București of Romania.

16 August 2016 1	Steaua București (Romania)	0–5	(England) Manchester City	Bucharest, Romania
19:45 BST	Tudorie (yellow card) 57'; Toșca (yellow card) 58'; Tamaș (yellow card) 86'	Report	Zabaleta (yellow card) 4'; Agüero (penalty missed) 8', (penalty missed) 21', 41', 78', 89'; Silva 13'; Nolito 49'; Kolarov (yellow card) 53'	Stadium: Arena Națională; Attendance: 45,327; Referee: Daniele Orsato (Italy)

24 August 2016 2	Manchester City (England)	1–0 (6–0 agg.)	(Romania) Steaua București	Manchester, England
19:45 BST	Delph 56'	Report		Stadium: City of Manchester Stadium; Attendance: 40,064; Referee: Paweł Gil (Poland)

==== Group stage ====
The group stage draw was made on 25 August 2016 in Monaco. Manchester City were drawn with Barcelona (pot 1), Borussia Mönchengladbach (pot 3), and Celtic (pot 4).

Pos	Team	Pld	W	D	L	GF	GA	GD	Pts	Qualification	BAR	MCI	BMG	CEL
1	(Spain) Barcelona	6	5	0	1	20	4	+16	15	Advance to knockout phase	—	4–0	4–0	7–0
2	(England) Manchester City	6	2	3	1	12	10	+2	9	Advance to knockout phase	3–1	—	4–0	1–1
3	(Germany) Borussia Mönchengladbach	6	1	2	3	5	12	−7	5	Transfer to Europa League	1–2	1–1	—	1–1
4	(Scotland) Celtic	6	0	3	3	5	16	−11	3		0–2	3–3	0–2	—

Source: UEFA
Rules for classification: Group stage tiebreakers

14 September 2016 1	Manchester City (England)	4–0	(Germany) Borussia Mönchengladbach	Manchester, England
20:45 CEST (UTC+02:00)	Agüero 8', 28' (pen.), 77'; Otamendi (yellow card) 48'; Iheanacho 90+1'	Report	Kramer (yellow card) 27'	Stadium: City of Manchester Stadium; Attendance: 30,270; Referee: Björn Kuipers (Netherlands)

28 September 2016 2	Celtic (Scotland)	3–3	(England) Manchester City	Glasgow, Scotland
20:45 CEST (UTC+02:00)	Dembélé 3', 47'; Sterling 20' (o.g.)	Report	Fernandinho 11'; Sterling 28'; Nolito 55'	Stadium: Celtic Park; Attendance: 57,592; Referee: Nicola Rizzoli (Italy)

19 October 2016 3	Barcelona (Spain)	4–0	(England) Manchester City	Barcelona, Spain
20:45 CEST (UTC+02:00)	Messi 17', 61', 69'; Mathieu (yellow card) 71' (yellow-red card) 73'; Neymar (penalty missed) 87', 89'	Report	Silva (yellow card) 29'; Fernandinho (yellow card) 40'; Bravo (red card) 53'	Stadium: Camp Nou; Attendance: 96,290; Referee: Milorad Mažić (Serbia)

1 November 2016 4	Manchester City (England)	3–1	(Spain) Barcelona	Manchester, England
20:45 CET (UTC+01:00)	Sterling (yellow card) 11'; Gündoğan 39', 74'; De Bruyne 51'; Kolarov (yellow card) 60'	Report	Rakitić (yellow card) 20'; Messi 21'; Neymar (yellow card) 29'; Busquets (yellow card) 76'	Stadium: City of Manchester Stadium; Attendance: 53,340; Referee: Viktor Kassai (Hungary)

23 November 2016 5	Borussia Mönchengladbach (Germany)	1–1	(England) Manchester City	Mönchengladbach, Germany
20:45 CET (UTC+01:00)	Stindl (yellow card) 20' (yellow-red card) 51'; Raffael 23', (yellow card) 71'; Dahoud (yellow card) 49'; Jantschke (yellow card) 69'	Report	Fernandinho (yellow card) 43' (yellow-red card) 63'; Silva 45+1'	Stadium: Borussia-Park; Attendance: 45,921; Referee: Cüneyt Çakır (Turkey)

6 December 2016 6	Manchester City (England)	1–1	(Scotland) Celtic	Manchester, England
20:45 CET (UTC+01:00)	Iheanacho 8'; Gündoğan (yellow card) 79'	Report	Roberts 4'; Lustig (yellow card) 44'; Brown (yellow card) 85'	Stadium: City of Manchester Stadium; Attendance: 51,297; Referee: Slavko Vinčić (Slovenia)

==== Round of 16 ====
21 February 2017 First leg	Manchester City (England)	5–3	(France) Monaco	Manchester
19:45 GMT	Sterling 26'; Agüero (yellow card) 35', (goal) 58', 71'; Fernandinho (yellow card) 40'; Otamendi (yellow card) 49'; Zabaleta (yellow card) 73'; Stones 77'; Sané 82'	Report	Glik (yellow card) 8'; Sidibé (yellow card) 25'; Falcao 32', 61', (penalty missed) 50', (yellow card) 67'; Mbappé 40'; Bakayoko (yellow card) 55'; Silva (yellow card) 76'; Fabinho (yellow card) 82'	Stadium: City of Manchester Stadium; Attendance: 53,351; Referee: Antonio Mateu Lahoz (Spain)

15 March 2017 Second leg	Monaco (France)	3–1 (6 (a) –6 agg.)	(England) Manchester City	Monaco
19:45 WET (UTC±00:00)	Mbappé 8'; Fabinho 29'; Bakayoko (yellow card) 59', (goal) 77'; Germain (yellow card) 89'; Lemar (yellow card) 90+2'	Report	Sagna (yellow card) 11'; De Bruyne (yellow card) 58'; Sané 71'; Sterling (yellow card) 74'	Stadium: Stade Louis II; Attendance: 15,700; Referee: Gianluca Rocchi (Italy)

== Squad information ==
=== First-team squad ===
N	Pos.	Nat.	Name	Age	EU	Since	App	Goals	Ends	Transfer fee	Notes
1	GK	(Chile)	Claudio Bravo	34	EU	2016	30	0	2020	£15.4M	Second nationality: Spain
3	RB	(France)	Bacary Sagna	34	EU	2014	87	0	2017	Free	
4	CB	(Belgium)	Vincent Kompany	31	EU	2008	313	17	2019	£6M	Captain
5	RB	(Argentina)	Pablo Zabaleta	32	Non-EU	2008	333	12	2017	£6M	
6	DM	(Brazil)	Fernando	29	Non-EU	2014	103	4	2019	£12M	
7	LW	(England)	Raheem Sterling	22	EU	2015	94	21	2020	£44M	
8	CM	(Germany)	İlkay Gündoğan	26	EU	2016	16	5	2020	£20M	
9	LW	(Spain)	Nolito	30	EU	2016	30	6	2020	£13.8M	
10	ST	(Argentina)	Sergio Agüero	28	Non-EU	2011	253	169	2019	£38M	
11	LB	(Serbia)	Aleksandar Kolarov	31	EU	2010	247	21	2018	£16M	
13	GK	(Argentina)	Willy Caballero	35	Non-EU	2014	48	0	2017	£4.4M	
15	RM	(Spain)	Jesús Navas	31	EU	2013	183	8	2017	£14.9M	
17	RM	(Belgium)	Kevin De Bruyne	25	EU	2015	90	23	2021	£54.5M	Record Signing
18	CM	(England)	Fabian Delph	27	EU	2015	42	4	2020	£8M	
19	RM	(Germany)	Leroy Sané	21	EU	2016	37	9	2021	£37M	
21	AM	(Spain)	David Silva	31	EU	2010	306	51	2019	£24M	
22	LB	(France)	Gaël Clichy	31	EU	2011	203	3	2017	£7M	
24	CB	(England)	John Stones	22	EU	2016	41	2	2022	£47.5M	
25	CM	(Brazil)	Fernandinho	32	Non-EU	2013	183	17	2017	£30M	
30	CB	(Argentina)	Nicolás Otamendi	29	Non-EU	2015	92	2	2020	£28M	
33	ST	(Brazil)	Gabriel Jesus	20	Non-EU	2017	11	7	2021	£27M	
42	CM	(Ivory Coast)	Yaya Touré	34	Non-EU	2010	299	82	2017	£24M	
50	RB	(Spain)	Pablo Maffeo	19	EU	2015	3	0	2019	£85,000	Academy Graduate
53	CB	(England)	Tosin Adarabioyo	19	EU	2016	4	0	2017	Free	Academy Graduate
54	GK	(England)	Angus Gunn	21	EU	2017	0	0	2020	£235,000	Academy Graduate
69	LB	(Spain)	Angeliño	20	EU	2014	3	0	2019	£3.83M	Academy Graduate
72	ST	(Nigeria)	Kelechi Iheanacho	20	Non-EU	2015	64	21	2021	£360,000	Academy Graduate
75	CM	(Spain)	Aleix García	19	EU	2014	9	1	2020	£1.7M	Academy Graduate

Updated to match played 21 May 2017
Source: mancity.com
Ordered by squad number.
Appearances include league and cup appearances, including as substitute.

=== Playing statistics ===
As of 21 May 2017

Appearances (Apps.) numbers are for appearances in competitive games only including sub appearances
Red card numbers denote: Numbers in parentheses represent red cards overturned for wrongful dismissal.

No.	Nat.	Player	Pos.	Premier League				FA Cup				League Cup				Champions League				Total			
No.	Nat.	Player	Pos.	Apps	Goal	Yellow card	Red card	Apps	Goal	Yellow card	Red card	Apps	Goal	Yellow card	Red card	Apps	Goal	Yellow card	Red card	Apps	Goal	Yellow card	Red card
1	(Chile)	Claudio Bravo	GK	22				4								4			1	30			1
3	(France)	Bacary Sagna	DF	17		2		3		1						5		1		25		4	
4	(Belgium)	Vincent Kompany	DF	10	3	5		2				2								14	3	5	
5	(Argentina)	Pablo Zabaleta	DF	19	1	2		4	1			1				7		2		31	2	4	
6	(Brazil)	Fernando	MF	14		3		4				2		1		6				26		4	
7	(England)	Raheem Sterling	MF	33	7	7		5	1	1		1				8	2	3		47	10	11	
8	(Germany)	İlkay Gündoğan	MF	10	3											6	2	1		16	5	1	
9	(Spain)	Nolito	FW	19	4	3	1	4				1				6	2			30	6	3	1
10	(Argentina)	Sergio Agüero	FW	31	20	4	1	5	5			1				8	8	1		45	33	5	1
11	(Serbia)	Aleksandar Kolarov	DF	28	1	6		2		1		1				8		2		39	1	9	
13	(Argentina)	Willy Caballero	GK	16				2				2				6				26			
15	(Spain)	Jesús Navas	MF	24		2		4				2				6				36		2	
17	(Belgium)	Kevin De Bruyne	MF	35	6	4		5		1		1				7	1	1		48	7	6	
18	(England)	Fabian Delph	MF	7	1	1		5		1						1	1			13	2	2	
19	(Germany)	Leroy Sané	FW	25	5	3		5	2	1		2				4	2			36	9	4	
21	(Spain)	David Silva	MF	33	4	6		4	2							7	2	1		44	8	7	
22	(France)	Gaël Clichy	DF	25	1	2		5				2	1			7				39	2	2	
24	(England)	John Stones	DF	26		1		4	1			1				9	1			40	2	1	
25	(Brazil)	Fernandinho	MF	31	2	4	2	3		1						9	1	3	1	43	3	8	3
30	(Argentina)	Nicolás Otamendi	DF	29	1	9		5		1		1				7		2		42	1	12	
33	(Brazil)	Gabriel Jesus	FW	10	7	2		1												11	7	2	
42	(Ivory Coast)	Yaya Touré	MF	24	5	4		4	2	1						2				30	7	5	
50	(Spain)	Pablo Maffeo	DF									1				2				3			
53	(England)	Tosin Adarabioyo	DF									1				2				3			
54	(England)	Angus Gunn	GK																				
55	(Spain)	Brahim Díaz	MF									1								1			
69	(Spain)	Angeliño	DF									1				1				2			
72	(Nigeria)	Kelechi Iheanacho	FW	20	4			3	1			2		1		4	2			29	7	1	
75	(Spain)	Aleix García	MF	4				2				2	1							8	1		
On loan	(England)	Joe Hart	GK													1				1			
On loan	(France)	Samir Nasri	MF	1																1			
Own goals					5				1				0				0				6		
Totals					65	65	4		16	9	0		2	2	0		24	17	2		107	93	6

Source: (for players and positions) First Team Squad (for squad numbers) Squad Profiles (for actual stats.)

=== Goalscorers ===
Includes all competitive matches. The list is sorted alphabetically by surname when total goals are equal.

Correct as of match played on 21 May 2017

No.	Pos.	Player	Premier League	FA Cup	League Cup	Champions League	TOTAL
10	FW	(Argentina) Sergio Agüero	20	5	0	8	33
7	MF	(England) Raheem Sterling	7	1	0	2	10
19	FW	(Germany) Leroy Sané	5	2	0	2	9
21	MF	(Spain) David Silva	4	2	0	2	8
42	MF	(Ivory Coast) Yaya Touré	5	2	0	0	7
33	FW	(Brazil) Gabriel Jesus	7	0	0	0	7
72	FW	(Nigeria) Kelechi Iheanacho	4	1	0	2	7
17	MF	(Belgium) Kevin De Bruyne	6	0	0	1	7
9	FW	(Spain) Nolito	4	0	0	2	6
8	MF	(Germany) İlkay Gündoğan	3	0	0	2	5
4	DF	(Belgium) Vincent Kompany	3	0	0	0	3
25	MF	(Brazil) Fernandinho	2	0	0	1	3
22	DF	(France) Gaël Clichy	1	0	1	0	2
24	DF	(England) John Stones	0	1	0	1	2
5	DF	(Argentina) Pablo Zabaleta	1	1	0	0	2
18	MF	(England) Fabian Delph	1	0	0	1	2
75	MF	(Spain) Aleix García	0	0	1	0	1
11	DF	(Serbia) Aleksandar Kolarov	1	0	0	0	1
30	DF	(Argentina) Nicolás Otamendi	1	0	0	0	1
Own Goals			5	1	0	0	6
Totals			80	16	2	24	122

=== Awards ===
==== Premier League Player of the Month award ====
Awarded monthly to the player who was chosen by a panel assembled by the Premier League's sponsor

Month	Player
August	(England) Raheem Sterling

==== Premier League Manager of the Month award ====
Awarded monthly to the manager who was chosen by a panel assembled by the Premier League's sponsor

Month	Player
February	(Spain) Pep Guardiola

==== Etihad Player of the Month awards ====
Awarded to the player that receives the most votes in a poll conducted each month on the club's official website

Month	Player
August	(England) Raheem Sterling
September	(Belgium) Kevin De Bruyne
October	(Germany) İlkay Gündoğan
November	(Belgium) Kevin De Bruyne
December	(Ivory Coast) Yaya Touré
January	(Spain) David Silva
February	(Germany) Leroy Sané
March	(Germany) Leroy Sané

==== Etihad Player of the Season ====
In association with the Official Manchester City Supporters Club (Spain) David Silva

== Transfers ==
=== Transfers in ===
First Team
Date	Position	No.	Player	From club	Transfer fee
1 June 2016	MF	8	(Germany) İlkay Gündoğan	(Germany) Borussia Dortmund	£20,000,000
1 July 2016	FW	9	(Spain) Nolito	(Spain) Celta Vigo	£13,800,000
4 July 2016	MF	35	(Ukraine) Oleksandr Zinchenko	(Russia) Ufa	£1,700,000
2 August 2016	FW	19	(Germany) Leroy Sané	(Germany) Schalke 04	£37,000,000
6 August 2016	FW	29	(Colombia) Marlos Moreno	(Colombia) Atlético Nacional	£4,750,000
9 August 2016	DF	24	(England) John Stones	(England) Everton	£47,500,000
25 August 2016	GK	1	(Chile) Claudio Bravo	(Spain) Barcelona	£15,400,000
19 January 2017	FW	33	(Brazil) Gabriel Jesus	(Brazil) Palmeiras	£27,000,000

EDS, Academy and other
Date	Position	No.	Player	From club	Transfer fee
24 June 2016	MF	—	(Argentina) Benjamín Garré	(Argentina) Vélez Sarsfield	Undisc.
30 June 2016	MF	—	(Australia) Aaron Mooy	(Australia) Melbourne City	Free
1 July 2016	FW	—	(Switzerland) Lorenzo Gonzalez	(Switzerland) Servette	Undisc.
4 July 2016	GK	—	(England) Louie Moulden	(England) Liverpool	Free
19 July 2016	GK	—	(Argentina) Gerónimo Rulli	(Uruguay) Deportivo Maldonado	£4,000,000
16 August 2016	DF	—	(Spain) Pablo Marí	(Spain) Gimnàstic Tarragona	Undisc.
23 September 2016	FW	—	(Wales) Rabbi Matondo	(Wales) Cardiff City	Undisc.
20 January 2017	DF	—	(England) Finley Burns	(England) Southend United	£175,000
31 January 2017	MF	—	(Venezuela) Yangel Herrera	Atletico Venezuela	Undisc.
31 January 2017	FW	—	(Spain) Nabil Touaizi	(Spain) Valencia	€300,000

Total spending: ▼£171,500,000

=== Transfers out ===
First Team
Exit date	Position	No.	Player	To club	Transfer fee
10 June 2016	DF	26	(Argentina) Martín Demichelis	(Spain) Espanyol	Free
10 June 2016	GK	29	(England) Richard Wright	Retired	Released
1 July 2016	FW	–	(Bosnia and Herzegovina) Edin Džeko	(Italy) Roma	£10,800,000
1 January 2017	FW	35	(Montenegro) Stevan Jovetić	(Italy) Inter Milan	£12,200,000

EDS and Academy
Exit date	Position	No.	Player	To club	Transfer fee
10 June 2016	DF	—	(England) Sam Tattum	Free agent	Released
10 June 2016	GK	—	(England) Charlie Albinson	Free agent	Released
18 June 2016	DF	48	(Belgium) Mathias Bossaerts	(Belgium) Oostende	Free
18 June 2016	MF	66	(France) Seko Fofana	(Italy) Udinese	£3,800,000
29 June 2016	DF	–	(France) Florian Lejeune	(Spain) Eibar	£1,200,000
1 July 2016	MF	–	(Portugal) Rafael Camacho	(England) Liverpool	Free
1 July 2016	DF	–	(England) Diego Lattie	(England) Liverpool	Free
31 August 2016	MF	–	(Malta) Myles Beerman	(Scotland) Rangers	Undisclosed
1 January 2017	GK	–	(Argentina) Gerónimo Rulli	(Spain) Real Sociedad	Undisclosed
12 January 2017	MF	73	(England) George Glendon	(England) Fleetwood Town	Undisclosed
13 January 2017	GK	45	(Republic of Ireland) Ian Lawlor	(England) Doncaster Rovers	Undisclosed
24 January 2017	MF	–	(Ghana) Bismark Adjei-Boateng	(United States) Colorado Rapids	Undisclosed
31 January 2017	MF	37	(Republic of Ireland) Jack Byrne	(England) Wigan Athletic	Undisclosed
14 March 2017	FW	–	(England) Joe Hardy	(England) Brentford	Undisclosed

Total earnings: ▲£28,000,000

=== Loans out ===
First Team
Start date	End date	Position	No.	Player	To club
6 August 2016	30 June 2017	FW	29	(Colombia) Marlos Moreno	(Spain) Deportivo La Coruña
26 August 2016	30 June 2017	MF	35	(Ukraine) Oleksandr Zinchenko	(Netherlands) PSV
31 August 2016	30 June 2017	GK	1	(England) Joe Hart	(Italy) Torino
31 August 2016	30 June 2017	MF	8	(France) Samir Nasri	(Spain) Sevilla
31 August 2016	30 June 2017	FW	14	(Ivory Coast) Wilfried Bony	(England) Stoke City
31 August 2016	30 June 2017	DF	20	(France) Eliaquim Mangala	(Spain) Valencia
31 August 2016	30 June 2017	DF	28	(Belgium) Jason Denayer	(England) Sunderland
1 January 2017	31 January 2017 (Note: On 31 January 2017, Angeliño's half-season loan at Girona was cut short and he joined RCD Mallorca for the remainder of the season.)	DF	69	(Spain) Angeliño	(Spain) Girona
1 January 2017	30 June 2017	DF	50	(Spain) Pablo Maffeo	(Spain) Girona
31 January 2017	30 June 2017	DF	69	(Spain) Angeliño	(Spain) Mallorca

EDS, Academy and other
Start date	End date	Position	No.	Player	To club
10 June 2016	30 June 2017	MF	47	(Australia) Luke Brattan	(Australia) Melbourne City
10 June 2016	30 June 2017	MF	—	(Australia) Anthony Cáceres	(Australia) Melbourne City
1 July 2016	6 January 2017 (Note: On 6 January 2017, Jack Byrne's season-long loan at Blackburn Rovers was cut short.)	MF	37	(Republic of Ireland) Jack Byrne	(England) Blackburn Rovers
6 July 2016	30 June 2017	MF	—	(Australia) Aaron Mooy	(England) Huddersfield Town
10 July 2016	30 June 2017	MF	—	(Ghana) Thomas Agyepong	(Netherlands) NAC Breda
10 July 2016	30 June 2017	DF	56	(England) Ashley Smith-Brown	(Netherlands) NAC Breda
15 July 2016	30 June 2017	FW	—	(Spain) Rubén Sobrino	(Spain) Alavés
21 July 2016	30 June 2017	FW	—	(Ghana) Yaw Yeboah	(Netherlands) Twente
23 July 2016	30 June 2017	FW	48	(Turkey) Enes Ünal	(Netherlands) Twente
29 July 2016	30 June 2017	MF	—	(Ghana) Divine Naah	(Denmark) Nordsjælland
9 August 2016	1 January 2017	GK	—	(Argentina) Gerónimo Rulli	(Spain) Real Sociedad
11 August 2016	2 January 2017 (Note: On 2 January 2017, David Faupala's season-long loan at NAC Breda was cut short.)	FW	51	(France) David Faupala	(Netherlands) NAC Breda
13 August 2016	2 January 2017	MF	73	(England) George Glendon	(England) Fleetwood Town
15 August 2016	30 June 2017	FW	62	(England) Brandon Barker	(Netherlands) NAC Breda
16 August 2016	11 January 2017 (Note: On 11 January 2017, Manu García's season-long loan at Alavés was cut short and he joined NAC Breda for the remainder of the season.)	MF	76	(Spain) Manu García	(Spain) Alavés
16 August 2016	30 June 2017	DF	—	(Spain) Pablo Marí	(Spain) Girona
17 August 2016	January 2017	DF	—	(England) Callum Bullock	(England) Crewe Alexandra
25 August 2016	30 June 2017	MF	59	(Kosovo) Bersant Celina	(Netherlands) Twente
31 August 2016	30 June 2017	MF	52	(England) Kean Bryan	(England) Bury
31 August 2016	30 June 2017	DF	46	(England) Shay Facey	(Netherlands) Heerenveen
31 August 2016	17 January 2017 (Note: On 17 January 2017, Bruno Zuculini's season-long loan at Vallecano was cut short and he joined Hellas Verona for the remainder of the season.)	MF	36	(Argentina) Bruno Zuculini	(Spain) Rayo Vallecano
2 September 2016	31 December 2016	FW	—	(Sweden) Zackarias Faour	(Denmark) Midtjylland
11 January 2017	30 June 2017	MF	76	(Spain) Manu García	(Netherlands) NAC Breda
17 January 2017	30 June 2017	MF	61	(England) James Horsfield	(Netherlands) NAC Breda
17 January 2017	30 June 2017	MF	36	(Argentina) Bruno Zuculini	(Italy) Hellas Verona
19 January 2017	30 June 2017	GK	64	(Wales) Billy O'Brien	(Scotland) St Mirren
31 January 2017	30 April 2017	FW	51	(France) David Faupala	(England) Chesterfield
31 January 2017	30 June 2017	FW	—	(Sweden) Zackarias Faour	(Denmark) Nordsjælland
8 February 2017	August 2017	DF	—	(Nigeria) Chidiebere Nwakali	(Norway) Sogndal
14 February 2017	31 December 2017	MF	—	(Venezuela) Yangel Herrera	(United States) New York City
