= Faour =

Faour is a surname. Notable people with the surname include:

- Fonse Faour (born 1951), Canadian politician
- Fred Faour (1964–2024), American author, gambler, and sports radio talk show host
- Haytham Faour (born 1990), Lebanese footballer
- Nisreen Faour (born 1972), Palestinian actress
- Wael Abou Faour (born 1974), Lebanese politician
- Zackarias Faour (born 1998), Swedish footballer
