= 2016–17 Manchester United F.C. season =

English football club season

Manchester United
2016–17 season
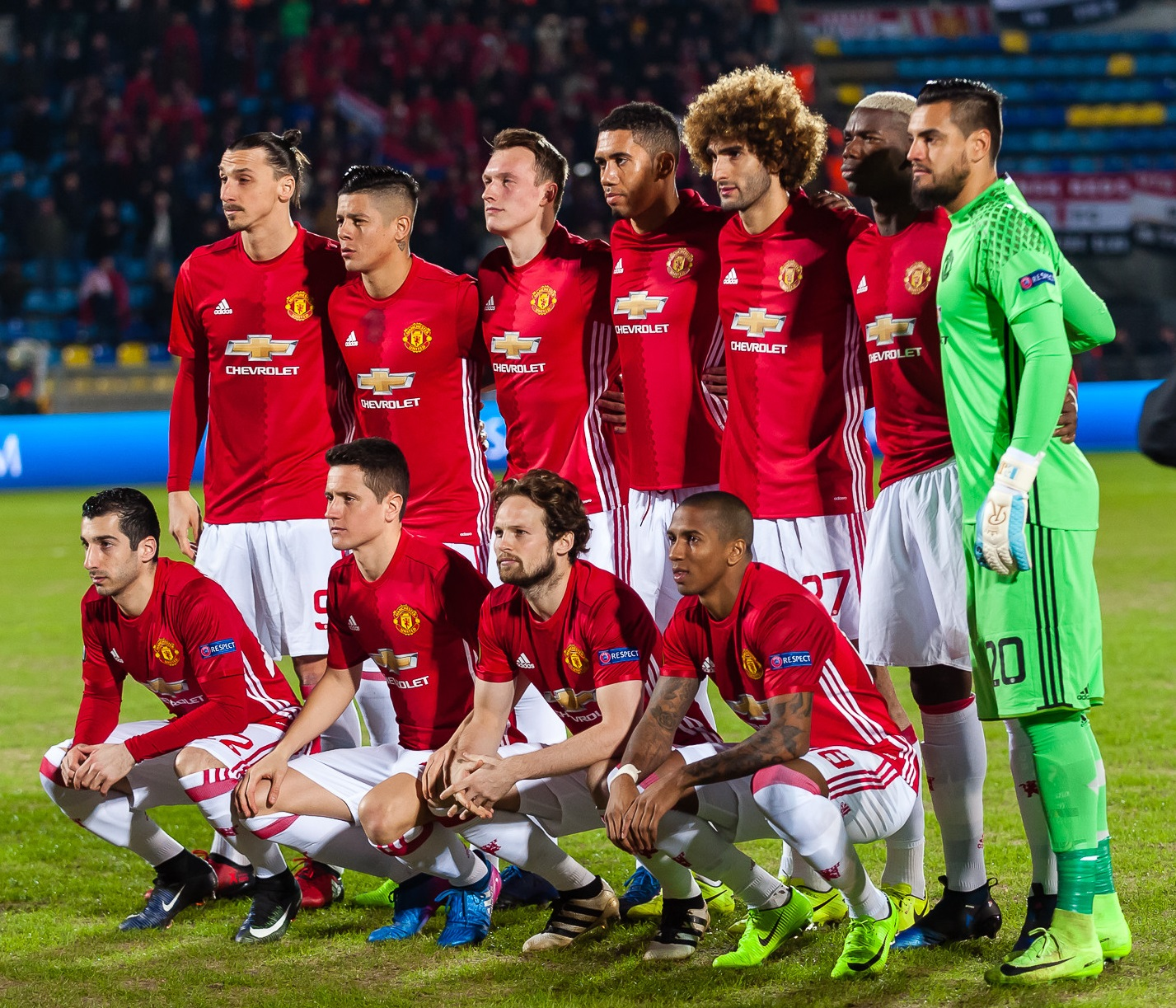
- Manchester United team for the Europa League game against Rostov, 9 March 2017
- Co-chairmen: Joel and Avram Glazer
- Manager: José Mourinho
- Stadium: Old Trafford
- Premier League: 6th
- FA Cup: Quarter-finals
- EFL Cup: Winners
- UEFA Europa League: Winners
- Community Shield: Winners
- Top goalscorer: League: Zlatan Ibrahimović (17); All: Zlatan Ibrahimović (28)
- Highest home attendance: 75,397 (vs. West Bromwich Albion, 1 April)
- Lowest home attendance: 58,179 (vs. Zorya Luhansk, 29 September)
- Average home league attendance: 75,290
Home colours	Away colours	Third colours

The 2016–17 season was Manchester United's 25th season in the Premier League, and their 42nd consecutive season in the top-flight of English football. Following the departure of Louis van Gaal at the end of the previous season, the club signed former Porto, Chelsea, Inter Milan and Real Madrid manager José Mourinho on a three-year contract, with the option of a further year.

As winners of the previous season's FA Cup, they faced Premier League winners Leicester City in the 2016 FA Community Shield, with United prevailing 2–1 to win the first trophy of the season. On 26 February 2017, the club won their second trophy of the campaign, beating Southampton 3–2 in the EFL Cup Final. Although they missed out on qualifying for the 2017–18 UEFA Champions League via league position, having finished in sixth place, they qualified as Europa League winners, beating Ajax 2–0 in the Europa League Final on 24 May 2017. That triumph also made United the fifth team to have won all three main European club trophies.

== Pre-season and friendlies ==
United preceded their 2016–17 campaign with a friendly against Wigan, a tour of China, a friendly in Sweden facing Turkish club Galatasaray in the 2016 SuperGame, and Wayne Rooney's testimonial match between Manchester United and Everton at Old Trafford. The season concluded with Michael Carrick's testimonial on 4 June between United players of the 2008 European Double-winning side (plus Dimitar Berbatov, who joined the club during the following transfer window, and Michael's brother, Graeme Carrick) and an all-star team picked by Carrick, both teams respectively managed by Sir Alex Ferguson and Harry Redknapp, Carrick's first manager as a professional footballer.

Date	Opponents	H / A	Result F–A	Scorers	Attendance
16 July 2016	Wigan Athletic	A	2–0	Keane 49', Pereira 58'	13,314
22 July 2016	Borussia Dortmund	N	1–4	Mkhitaryan 59'	38,285
25 July 2016	Manchester City	N	—	Match cancelled due to inadequate playing conditions	
30 July 2016	Galatasaray	N	5–2	Ibrahimović 4', Rooney (2) 55', 58' (pen.), Fellaini 62', Mata 74'	30,200
3 August 2016	Everton	H	0–0		58,597
4 June 2017	Michael Carrick XI	H	2–2	Vidić 28', Carrick 82'	70,027

== FA Community Shield ==
As a result of winning the 2015–16 FA Cup, Manchester United faced Leicester City, who won the 2015–16 Premier League, in their 30th FA Community Shield appearance. Manchester United won the match to claim their 21st Community Shield (including four shared titles).

Date	Opponents	H / A	Result F–A	Scorers	Attendance
7 August 2016	Leicester City	N	2–1	Lingard 32', Ibrahimović 83'	85,437

== Premier League ==
The Premier League season kicked off on 13 August and concluded on 21 May. United went undefeated for a season-record 25 matches between October and May, although 12 of them were draws.

Date	Opponents	H / A	Result F–A	Scorers	Attendance	League position
14 August 2016	Bournemouth	A	3–1	Mata 40', Rooney 59', Ibrahimović 64'	11,355	1st
19 August 2016	Southampton	H	2–0	Ibrahimović (2) 36', 52' (pen.)	75,326	1st
27 August 2016	Hull City	A	1–0	Rashford 90+2'	24,560	2nd
10 September 2016	Manchester City	H	1–2	Ibrahimović 42'	75,272	3rd
18 September 2016	Watford	A	1–3	Rashford 62'	21,118	7th
24 September 2016	Leicester City	H	4–1	Smalling 22', Mata 37', Rashford 40', Pogba 42'	75,256	6th
2 October 2016	Stoke City	H	1–1	Martial 69'	75,251	6th
17 October 2016	Liverpool	A	0–0		52,769	7th
23 October 2016	Chelsea	A	0–4		41,424	7th
29 October 2016	Burnley	H	0–0		75,325	8th
6 November 2016	Swansea City	A	3–1	Pogba 15', Ibrahimović (2) 21', 33'	20,938	6th
19 November 2016	Arsenal	H	1–1	Mata 68'	75,264	6th
27 November 2016	West Ham United	H	1–1	Ibrahimović 21'	75,314	6th
4 December 2016	Everton	A	1–1	Ibrahimović 42'	39,550	6th
11 December 2016	Tottenham Hotspur	H	1–0	Mkhitaryan 29'	75,271	6th
14 December 2016	Crystal Palace	A	2–1	Pogba 45+2', Ibrahimović 88'	25,547	6th
17 December 2016	West Bromwich Albion	A	2–0	Ibrahimović (2) 5', 56'	26,308	6th
26 December 2016	Sunderland	H	3–1	Blind 39', Ibrahimović 82', Mkhitaryan 86'	75,325	6th
31 December 2016	Middlesbrough	H	2–1	Martial 85', Pogba 86'	75,314	6th
2 January 2017	West Ham United	A	2–0	Mata 63', Ibrahimović 78'	56,996	6th
15 January 2017	Liverpool	H	1–1	Ibrahimović 84'	75,276	6th
21 January 2017	Stoke City	A	1–1	Rooney 90+4'	27,423	6th
1 February 2017	Hull City	H	0–0		75,297	6th
5 February 2017	Leicester City	A	3–0	Mkhitaryan 42', Ibrahimović 44', Mata 49'	32,072	6th
11 February 2017	Watford	H	2–0	Mata 32', Martial 60'	75,301	6th
4 March 2017	Bournemouth	H	1–1	Rojo 23'	75,245	6th
19 March 2017	Middlesbrough	A	3–1	Fellaini 30', Lingard 62', Valencia 90+3'	32,689	5th
1 April 2017	West Bromwich Albion	H	0–0		75,397	5th
4 April 2017	Everton	H	1–1	Ibrahimović 90+4' (pen.)	75,272	6th
9 April 2017	Sunderland	A	3–0	Ibrahimović 30', Mkhitaryan 46', Rashford 89'	43,779	5th
16 April 2017	Chelsea	H	2–0	Rashford 7', Herrera 49'	75,272	5th
23 April 2017	Burnley	A	2–0	Martial 21', Rooney 39'	21,870	5th
27 April 2017	Manchester City	A	0–0		54,176	5th
30 April 2017	Swansea City	H	1–1	Rooney 45+3' (pen.)	75,271	5th
7 May 2017	Arsenal	A	0–2		60,055	5th
14 May 2017	Tottenham Hotspur	A	1–2	Rooney 71'	31,848	6th
17 May 2017	Southampton	A	0–0		31,425	6th
21 May 2017	Crystal Palace	H	2–0	Harrop 15', Pogba 19'	75,254	6th

Pos	Team	Pld	W	D	L	GF	GA	GD	Pts	Qualification or relegation
4	Liverpool	38	22	10	6	78	42	+36	76	Qualification for the Champions League play-off round
5	Arsenal	38	23	6	9	77	44	+33	75	Qualification for the Europa League group stage (Note: Arsenal qualified for the Europa League group stage by winning the 2016–17 FA Cup. As they had also qualified there by the virtue of their league position (5th), this spot was passed to the next-highest ranked team (6th), Manchester United.)
6	Manchester United	38	18	15	5	54	29	+25	69	Qualification for the Champions League group stage (Note: Manchester United qualified for the Champions League group stage by winning the 2016–17 UEFA Europa League. Based on their league position (6th), they would have received the spot above to enter the Europa League group stage. This spot was vacated without replacement as per UEFA regulations.)
7	Everton	38	17	10	11	62	44	+18	61	Qualification for the Europa League third qualifying round (Note: Manchester United, winners of the 2016–17 EFL Cup, initially attained a spot in the Europa League third qualifying round. That was passed to the next-highest ranked team in the league not already qualified for UEFA competitions (7th-placed Everton).)
8	Southampton	38	12	10	16	41	48	−7	46	

Source: Premier League
Rules for classification: 1) Points; 2) Goal difference; 3) Goals scored; 4) Play-offs (only if needed to decide champion, teams for relegation or teams for UEFA competitions).

== FA Cup ==
Manchester United entered the FA Cup in the third round with the other Premier League clubs, as well as those from the Championship. The third round draw was made on 5 December and it drew United with a home tie against Championship side Reading, managed by Jaap Stam, who returned to Old Trafford for the first time since leaving United in 2001 after a three-year spell. United cruised to a 4–0 victory on 7 January with first-half goals from Wayne Rooney – who equalled Bobby Charlton's 249-goal record for the club in the process, Anthony Martial and a second-half brace from Marcus Rashford. League One champions Wigan Athletic, managed by Warren Joyce who left his Manchester United Under-23 coaching role in November to join Wigan, were drawn as United's fourth round opponents on 9 January for another home tie. United beat the Latics 4–0 and were subsequently drawn away to Championship side Blackburn Rovers in the fifth round. United came from behind to secure a 2–1 victory, thanks to goals from Marcus Rashford and substitute Zlatan Ibrahimović. In the quarter-finals, United were drawn away to Premier League rivals Chelsea. In a fiercely contested game, Ander Herrera was sent off and N'Golo Kanté scored the winning goal to end Manchester United's defence of the FA Cup.

Date	Round	Opponents	H / A	Result F–A	Scorers	Attendance
7 January 2017	Round 3	Reading	H	4–0	Rooney 7', Martial 15', Rashford (2) 75', 79'	74,396
29 January 2017	Round 4	Wigan Athletic	H	4–0	Fellaini 44', Smalling 57', Mkhitaryan 74', Schweinsteiger 81'	75,229
19 February 2017	Round 5	Blackburn Rovers	A	2–1	Rashford 27', Ibrahimović 75'	23,130
13 March 2017	Quarter-finals	Chelsea	A	0–1		40,801

== EFL Cup ==
As one of seven English clubs who qualified for European competition in the 2015–16 season, United received a bye to the third round of the EFL Cup, the draw for which took place on 24 August 2016. United were drawn away against Northampton Town. The match was played 21 September 2016 and Manchester United won 3–1; Michael Carrick opened the scoring in the 17th minute, but Northampton's Alex Revell equalised from the penalty spot shortly before half-time. However, goals from Ander Herrera and Marcus Rashford midway through the second half secured the win for United. The draw for the fourth round took place shortly after the match and United were drawn at home against rivals Manchester City. The game was played on 26 October 2016 with the Reds winning 1–0 via Juan Mata's goal in the 54th minute.

Manchester United were again drawn at home in the fifth round, this time against West Ham, and United cruised to a 4–1 win, with two goals each for Zlatan Ibrahimović and Anthony Martial. Former Manchester United youth player Ashley Fletcher scored the only goal for the Hammers in the 35th minute. The draw for the semi–finals saw United paired with Hull City. The first leg was played at Old Trafford on 10 January 2017, with Mata and substitute Marouane Fellaini giving United a 2–0 win. Two weeks later, United lost the second leg at the KCOM Stadium 2–1 but progressed to the final 3–2 on aggregate.

Their opponents in the final, played on 26 February, were Southampton, who had beaten Liverpool in the semi-finals. Ibrahimović and Lingard gave United a 2–0 lead, only for Manolo Gabbiadini to level the scores with a goal on either side of the half-time break; however, Ibrahimović scored in the 87th minute to give United a 3–2 victory.

Date	Round	Opponents	H / A	Result F–A	Scorers	Attendance
21 September 2016	Round 3	Northampton Town	A	3–1	Carrick 17', Herrera 68', Rashford 75'	7,798
26 October 2016	Round 4	Manchester City	H	1–0	Mata 54'	74,196
30 November 2016	Round 5	West Ham United	H	4–1	Ibrahimović (2) 2', 90+3', Martial (2) 48', 62'	65,269
10 January 2017	Semi-finals; First leg	Hull City	H	2–0	Mata 56', Fellaini 87'	65,798
26 January 2017	Semi-finals; Second leg	Hull City	A	1–2	Pogba 66'	16,831
26 February 2017	Final	Southampton	N	3–2	Ibrahimović (2) 19', 87', Lingard 38'	85,264

== UEFA Europa League ==
=== Group stage ===
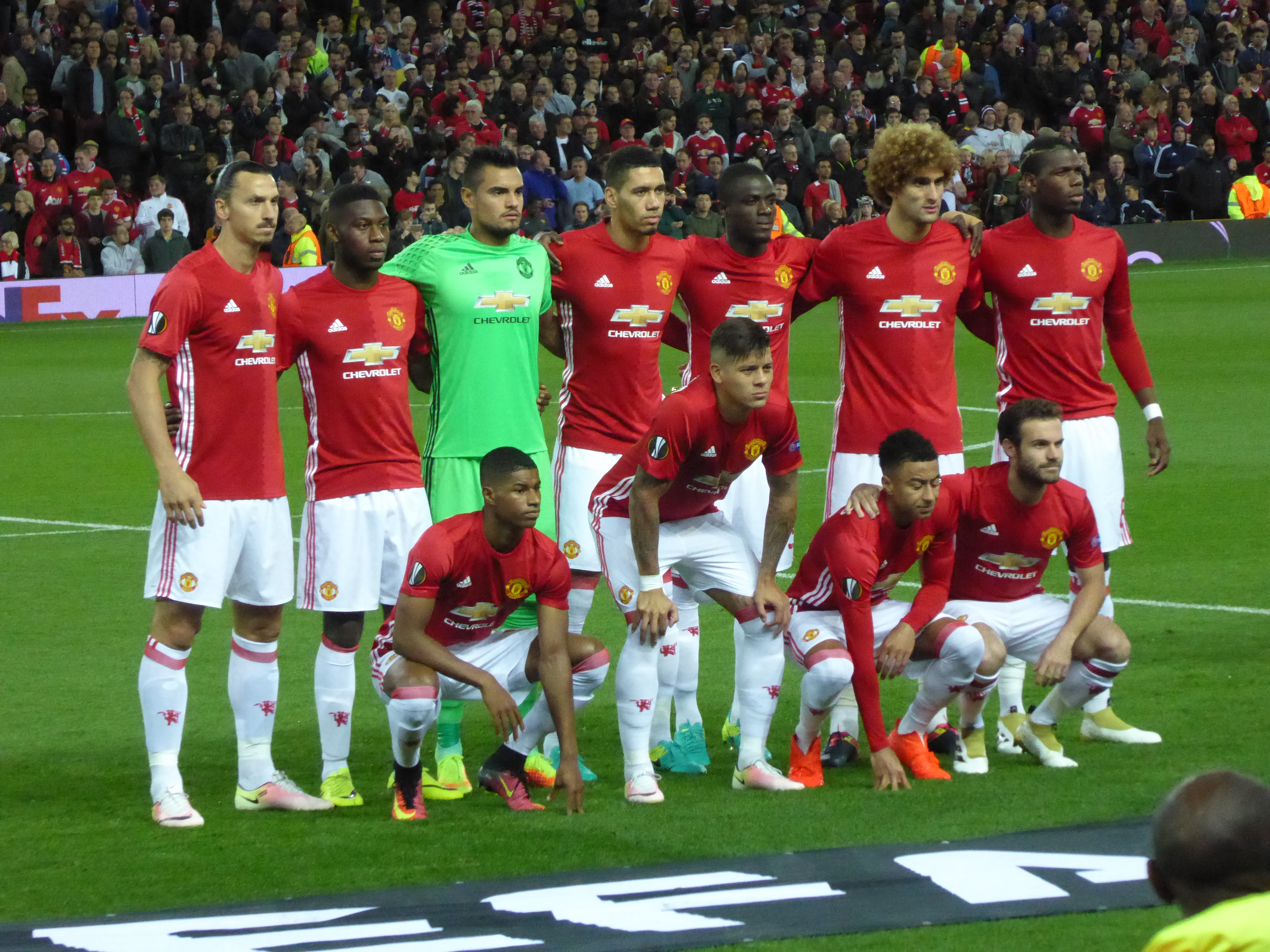
Manchester United players before the game against Zorya Luhansk in September 2016

As FA Cup winners, United entered the Europa League at the group stage. The draw took place on 26 August 2016 and saw United paired with Turkish league runners-up Fenerbahçe, Dutch cup winners Feyenoord and the fourth-placed team from the Ukrainian league, Zorya Luhansk. They had met Fenerbahçe in Europe twice before (1996–97 and 2004–05) and Feyenoord once before (1997–98). The fixture schedule saw United first head to the Netherlands to play Feyenoord on 15 September, then a home game against Zorya Luhansk two weeks later, followed by a double-header against Fenerbahçe, first at home then away. The programme then closed with the return games against Feyenoord and Zorya Luhansk. Due to the war in Donbas, the away game against Zorya Luhansk was played at Chornomorets Stadium in Odesa.

Date	Opponents	H / A	Result F–A	Scorers	Attendance	Group position
15 September 2016	Feyenoord	A	0–1		31,000	4th
29 September 2016	Zorya Luhansk	H	1–0	Ibrahimović 69'	58,179	3rd
20 October 2016	Fenerbahçe	H	4–1	Pogba (2) 31' (pen.), 45+2', Martial 34' (pen.), Lingard 48'	73,063	2nd
3 November 2016	Fenerbahçe	A	1–2	Rooney 89'	35,378	3rd
24 November 2016	Feyenoord	H	4–0	Rooney 35', Mata 69', Jones 75' (o.g.), Lingard 90+2'	64,628	2nd
8 December 2016	Zorya Luhansk	A	2–0	Mkhitaryan 48', Ibrahimović 88'	25,900	2nd

Pos	Team	Pld	W	D	L	GF	GA	GD	Pts	Qualification
1	(Turkey) Fenerbahçe	6	4	1	1	8	6	+2	13	Advance to knockout phase
2	(England) Manchester United	6	4	0	2	12	4	+8	12	Advance to knockout phase
3	(Netherlands) Feyenoord	6	2	1	3	3	7	−4	7	
4	(Ukraine) Zorya Luhansk	6	0	2	4	2	8	−6	2	

Source: UEFA
Rules for classification: Group stage tiebreakers

=== Knockout phase ===
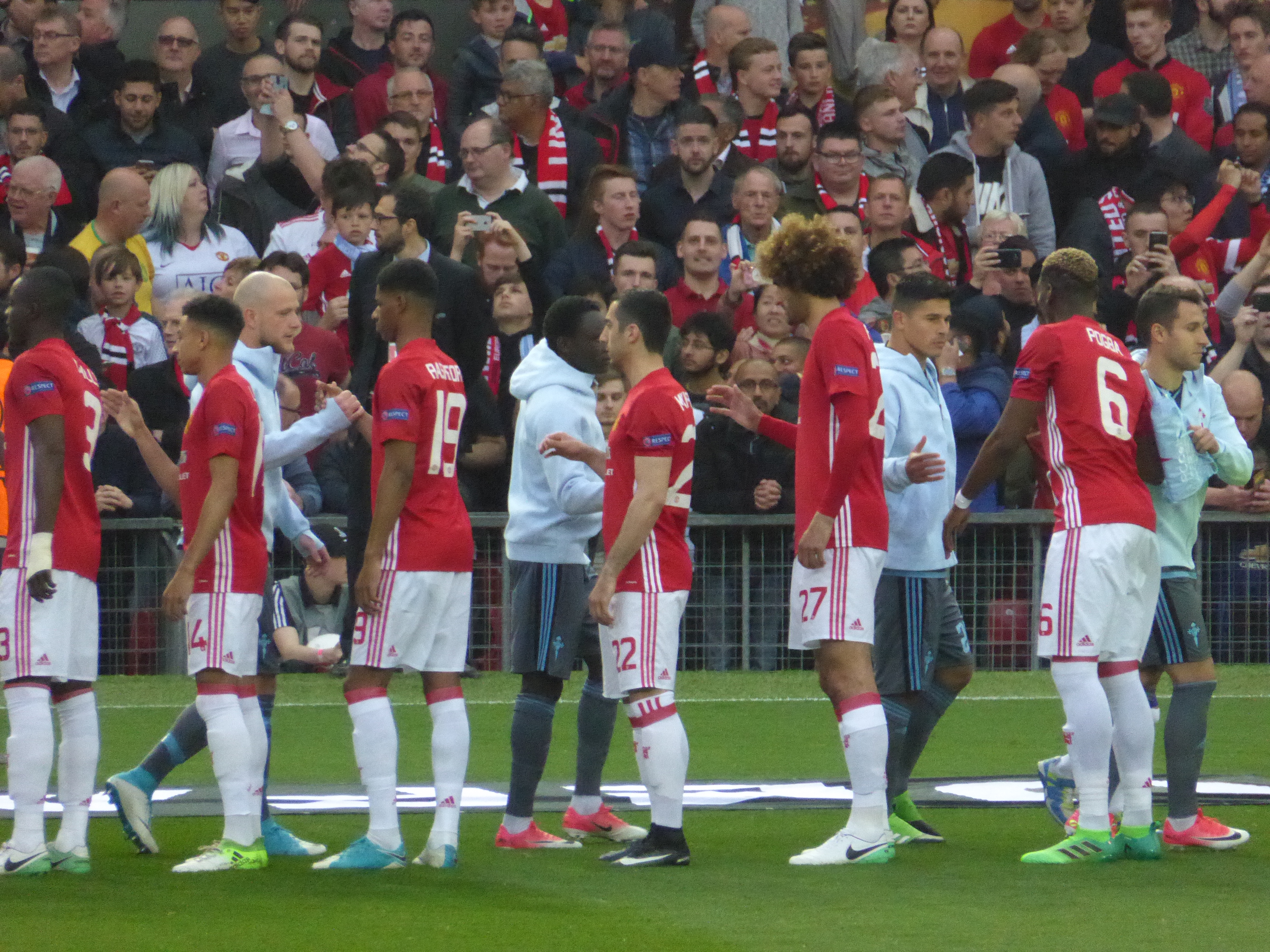
Manchester United players before the game against Celta Vigo in May 2017

The draw for the round of 32 was made on 12 December, with Manchester United drawn against French side Saint-Étienne, who finished top of group C. The tie saw Manchester United midfielder Paul Pogba come up against his elder brother, Florentin, who plays as a defender for the French side. Manchester United's only previous meeting with Saint-Étienne came in the first round of the 1977–78 European Cup Winners' Cup; the second leg was played at Home Park in Plymouth after Manchester United were banned from playing within 200 kilometres (120 mi) of Old Trafford, following crowd trouble at the first leg in Saint-Étienne. The home tie saw Zlatan Ibrahimović score his maiden hat-trick for the club, while a goal from Henrikh Mkhitaryan in the second leg was enough to send United through. In the round of 16, United played Russian side Rostov, winning 2–1 on aggregate. United were drawn against Belgian side Anderlecht in the quarter-finals where Mkhitaryan scored in his fourth consecutive European away game. In the return leg, an extra-time strike from Marcus Rashford sent United into the semi-finals, 3–2 on aggregate. A Rashford strike against semi-final opponents Celta Vigo gave United a first win in Spain since 2010. A 1–1 draw in the return leg secured United's progress 2–1 on aggregate. United faced Dutch side Ajax in the final, with goals from Pogba and Mkhitaryan in either half leading them to victory for their first ever Europa League crown. With this victory, they became only the fifth club to have won all three major European trophies (European Champion Clubs' Cup/UEFA Champions League, UEFA Cup/Europa League, and the now defunct UEFA Cup Winners' Cup). This win also qualified them as the fifth English team in the following season's Champions League.

Date	Round	Opponents	H / A	Result F–A	Scorers	Attendance
16 February 2017	Round of 32; First leg	Saint-Étienne	H	3–0	Ibrahimović (3) 15', 75', 88' (pen.)	67,192
22 February 2017	Round of 32; Second leg	Saint-Étienne	A	1–0	Mkhitaryan 16'	41,492
9 March 2017	Round of 16; First leg	Rostov	A	1–1	Mkhitaryan 35'	14,223
16 March 2017	Round of 16; Second leg	Rostov	H	1–0	Mata 70'	64,361
13 April 2017	Quarter-finals; First leg	Anderlecht	A	1–1	Mkhitaryan 36'	20,000
20 April 2017	Quarter-finals; Second leg	Anderlecht	H	2–1 (a.e.t.)	Mkhitaryan 10', Rashford 107'	71,496
4 May 2017	Semi-finals; First leg	Celta Vigo	A	1–0	Rashford 67'	26,202
11 May 2017	Semi-finals; Second leg	Celta Vigo	H	1–1	Fellaini 17'	75,138
24 May 2017	Final	Ajax	N	2–0	Pogba 18', Mkhitaryan 48'	46,961

== Squad statistics ==
No.	Pos.	Name	League		FA Cup		League Cup		Europe		Other		Total		Discipline	
No.	Pos.	Name	Apps	Goals	Apps	Goals	Apps	Goals	Apps	Goals	Apps	Goals	Apps	Goals	Yellow card	Red card
1	GK	(Spain) David de Gea	35	0	1	0	5	0	3	0	1	0	45	0	2	0
3	DF	(Ivory Coast) Eric Bailly	24(1)	0	0	0	1	0	11	0	1	0	37(1)	0	7	2
4	DF	(England) Phil Jones	18	0	1(1)	0	3	0	3	0	0	0	25(1)	0	3	0
5	DF	(Argentina) Marcos Rojo	18(3)	1	4	0	5	0	8(2)	0	0(1)	0	35(6)	1	5	0
6	MF	(France) Paul Pogba	29(1)	5	1(1)	0	4	1	15	3	0	0	49(2)	9	10	0
7	FW	(Netherlands) Memphis Depay	0(4)	0	0	0	1	0	0(3)	0	0	0	1(7)	0	1	0
8	MF	(Spain) Juan Mata	19(6)	6	2(1)	0	3	2	9(1)	2	0(1)	0	32(9)	10	5	0
9	FW	(Sweden) Zlatan Ibrahimović	27(1)	17	0(1)	1	4(1)	4	9(2)	5	1	1	41(4)	28	8	0
10	FW	(England) Wayne Rooney (c)	15(10)	5	2	1	3(1)	0	4(3)	2	1	0	25(14)	8	9	0
11	FW	(France) Anthony Martial	18(7)	4	3	1	2(1)	2	4(6)	1	1	0	28(14)	8	3	0
12	DF	(England) Chris Smalling	13(5)	1	4	1	4	0	8(2)	0	0	0	29(7)	2	0	0
14	MF	(England) Jesse Lingard	18(7)	1	1(1)	0	2(2)	1	6(4)	2	1	1	28(14)	5	6	0
15	MF	(Belgium) Adnan Januzaj	0	0	0	0	0	0	0	0	0	0	0	0	0	0
16	MF	(England) Michael Carrick (vc)	18(5)	0	2	0	4(1)	1	5(2)	0	1	0	30(8)	1	1	0
17	DF	(Netherlands) Daley Blind	21(3)	1	1	0	2(1)	0	10(1)	0	1	0	35(5)	1	4	0
18	MF	(England) Ashley Young	8(4)	0	3	0	1	0	3(4)	0	0	0	15(8)	0	5	0
19	FW	(England) Marcus Rashford	16(16)	5	3	3	3(3)	1	8(3)	2	0(1)	0	30(23)	11	3	0
20	GK	(Argentina) Sergio Romero	2	0	3	0	1	0	12	0	0	0	18	0	0	0
21	MF	(Spain) Ander Herrera	27(4)	1	2(1)	0	6	1	9	0	0(1)	0	44(6)	2	13	2
22	MF	(Armenia) Henrikh Mkhitaryan	14(9)	4	3	1	2	0	10(1)	6	0(1)	0	29(11)	11	4	0
23	DF	(England) Luke Shaw	9(2)	0	1	0	2	0	4	0	1	0	17(2)	0	1	0
24	DF	(Netherlands) Timothy Fosu-Mensah	1(3)	0	1(1)	0	1	0	1(3)	0	0	0	4(7)	0	1	0
25	DF	(Ecuador) Antonio Valencia	28(1)	1	1	0	3	0	8(1)	0	1	0	41(2)	1	7	0
27	MF	(Belgium) Marouane Fellaini	18(10)	1	2(1)	1	0(5)	1	7(3)	1	1	0	28(19)	4	9	1
28	MF	(France) Morgan Schneiderlin	0(3)	0	0	0	1(1)	0	2	0	0(1)	0	3(5)	0	1	0
31	MF	(Germany) Bastian Schweinsteiger	0	0	1(1)	1	0(1)	0	0(1)	0	0	0	1(3)	1	0	0
32	GK	(England) Sam Johnstone	0	0	0	0	0	0	0	0	0	0	0	0	0	0
34	GK	(England) Dean Henderson	0	0	0	0	0	0	0	0	0	0	0	0	0	0
35	DF	(England) Demetri Mitchell	1	0	0	0	0	0	0	0	0	0	1	0	0	0
36	DF	(Italy) Matteo Darmian	15(3)	0	2	0	2	0	7	0	0	0	26(3)	0	3	0
38	DF	(England) Axel Tuanzebe	4	0	0(1)	0	0	0	0	0	0	0	4(1)	0	0	0
39	MF	(Scotland) Scott McTominay	1(1)	0	0	0	0	0	0	0	0	0	1(1)	0	1	0
40	GK	(Portugal) Joel Castro Pereira	1	0	0(1)	0	0	0	0	0	0	0	1(1)	0	0	0
42	MF	(England) Matty Willock	0	0	0	0	0	0	0	0	0	0	0	0	0	0
43	DF	(England) Cameron Borthwick-Jackson	0	0	0	0	0	0	0	0	0	0	0	0	0	0
44	MF	(Brazil) Andreas Pereira	0	0	0	0	0	0	0	0	0	0	0	0	0	0
45	GK	(Republic of Ireland) Kieran O'Hara	0	0	0	0	0	0	0	0	0	0	0	0	0	0
46	FW	(England) Josh Harrop	1	1	0	0	0	0	0	0	0	0	1	1	0	0
47	MF	(England) Angel Gomes	0(1)	0	0	0	0	0	0	0	0	0	0(1)	0	0	0
48	FW	(England) Zak Dearnley	0	0	0	0	0	0	0	0	0	0	0	0	0	0
Own goals			–	0	–	0	–	0	–	1	–	0	–	1	–	–

Statistics accurate as of 24 May 2017.

== Transfers ==
=== In ===
Date	Pos.	Name	From	Fee
6 June 2016	DF	(Ivory Coast) Eric Bailly	(Spain) Villarreal	Undisclosed (Note: Fee reported as £30 million)
1 July 2016	FW	(Sweden) Zlatan Ibrahimović	(France) Paris Saint-Germain	Free
6 July 2016	MF	(Armenia) Henrikh Mkhitaryan	(Germany) Borussia Dortmund	Undisclosed (Note: Fee reported as £26.3 million)
9 August 2016	MF	(France) Paul Pogba	(Italy) Juventus	£89m

=== Out ===
Date	Pos.	Name	To	Fee
10 June 2016	GK	(England) George Dorrington	Released (Note: Following his release, Dorrington signed for Huddersfield Town.)	
10 June 2016	GK	(Spain) Víctor Valdés	Released (Note: Following his release, Valdés signed for Middlesbrough.)	
10 June 2016	MF	(England) Nick Powell	Released (Note: Following his release, Powell signed for Wigan Athletic.)	
10 June 2016	MF	(England) Oliver Rathbone	Released (Note: Following his release, Rathbone signed for Rochdale.)	
12 July 2016	DF	(England) Tyler Reid	(Wales) Swansea City	Undisclosed
12 July 2016	MF	(England) Joe Rothwell	(England) Oxford United	Free
12 July 2016	FW	(England) Ashley Fletcher	(England) West Ham United	Free
13 July 2016	DF	(Republic of Ireland) Jimmy Dunne	(England) Burnley	Free
13 July 2016	GK	(England) Oliver Byrne	(Wales) Cardiff City	Free
11 August 2016	DF	(Northern Ireland) Paddy McNair	(England) Sunderland	£5.5m
11 August 2016	DF	(Scotland) Donald Love	(England) Sunderland	£5.5m
22 August 2016	DF	(England) Tyler Blackett	(England) Reading	Undisclosed
30 August 2016	FW	(England) Will Keane	(England) Hull City	Undisclosed
31 August 2016	MF	(England) James Weir	(England) Hull City	Undisclosed
12 January 2017	MF	(France) Morgan Schneiderlin	(England) Everton	£24m
20 January 2017	FW	(Netherlands) Memphis Depay	(France) Lyon	£13.8m
28 January 2017	MF	(England) Sean Goss	(England) Queens Park Rangers	Undisclosed (Note: Fee reported as £500,000)
2 February 2017	DF	(Libya) Sadiq El Fitouri	(England) Chesterfield	Free
29 March 2017	MF	(Germany) Bastian Schweinsteiger	(United States) Chicago Fire	Free

=== Loan out ===
Date from	Date to	Pos.	Name	To
23 July 2016	30 June 2017	DF	(Uruguay) Guillermo Varela	(Germany) Eintracht Frankfurt
12 August 2016	30 June 2017	MF	(Belgium) Adnan Januzaj	(England) Sunderland
20 August 2016	2 February 2017	FW	(England) James Wilson	(England) Derby County
22 August 2016	30 June 2017	DF	(England) Cameron Borthwick-Jackson	(England) Wolverhampton Wanderers
26 August 2016	30 June 2017	MF	(Brazil) Andreas Pereira	(Spain) Granada
31 August 2016	3 February 2017	GK	(England) Dean Henderson	(England) Grimsby Town
31 August 2016	5 January 2017	GK	(Portugal) Joel Castro Pereira	(Portugal) Belenenses
5 January 2017	30 June 2017	GK	(England) Sam Johnstone	(England) Aston Villa
17 January 2017	30 June 2017	DF	(England) Joe Riley	(England) Sheffield United
