= Mohammad Hashem Zamani =

Afghan poet

Mohammad Hashem Zamani محمد هاشم زماني
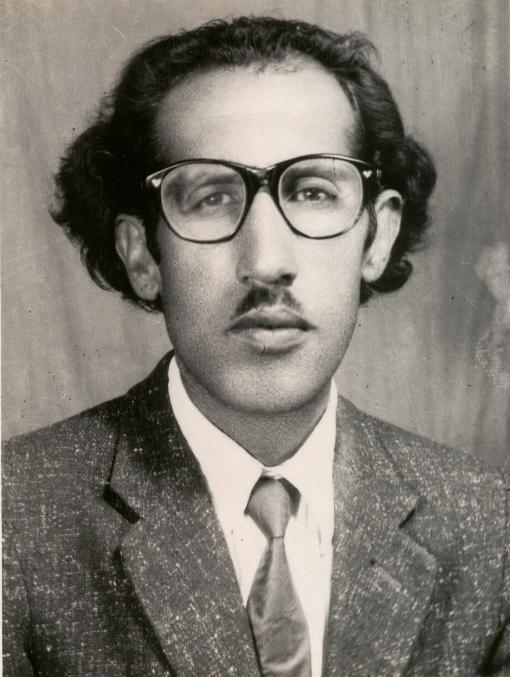
- Born: 1928; Lamattak, Kunar, Emirate of Afghanistan
- Died: 10 June 2005 (aged 76–77); Hayward, California, United States
- Resting place: Lamattak, Kunar, Afghanistan
- Occupations: Politician, Poet
- Years active: 1973-2005
- Known for: Pashto Poetry
- Political party: Independent
- Spouse: Bibi Shireen
- Children: Dr. Ahmad Sher Zamani, Zaman Zamani, Mahmood Zamani, Abdul Zamani, Zahida Zamani, Dr. Najiba Zamani, Dr. Nasima Zamani, Masuma Zamani
- Parent: Mir Zaman Khan

Mohammad Hashem Zamani (Pashto: محمد هاشم زماني - born 1928 - June 10, 2005), was a prominent Afghan poet.

== Biography ==
Mohammad Hashem was born in 1928 in the village of Lamattak, Kunar, Afghanistan to the Ghazi Mir Zaman Khan, who fought in the Third Anglo-Afghan War and was a general during King Amanullah Khan's regime.

Hashem Zamani obtained his primary education at the local mosque. He was 16 when, together with more than 100 family members, was imprisoned at Deh Mazang prison in Kabul, under the pretext of "political imprisonment".

While in prison, he met with and was influenced by the presence of prominent personalities of the time, for instance, Yaqub Khan Ghond Mashar, Sarwar Joya, Dr Mahmoodi and Ferqa Mashar Ghulam Nabi Khan Charkhi along with his family. Mohammad Hashem spent 13 years of his life in Deh Mazang prison, where he witnessed the demise of 28 members of his family due to various diseases and malnourishment. After 13 years of imprisonment, Zamani and his family were exiled in Herat for a further eight years.

He took part in the Grand Assembly convened during the presidency of Mohammed Daoud Khan as the representative of the people of Kunar.

Due to the Soviet invasion of Afghanistan in late 1979, Mohammad Hashem took refuge in Peshawar, Pakistan. He traveled extensively and participated in many different international conferences and gatherings. In 1987, Zamani migrated to the United States and settled in the Bay Area of San Francisco, California.

In the face of chronic ill health due to a second heart attack, and a stroke suffered in 1990 that paralyzed one half of his body, Mohammad Hashim continued his writings. He wrote the second part of "Scattered Flowers" and "The Injured Heart collection" as well as published 'Zindani Khaaterat". He was working through to the last night of his life on the second volume of his book which is currently being published, "Da Pohenay Inqilab",(or The Revolution of Consciousness).

Mohammad Hashem Zamani died due to a heart attack on 10 June 2005, in Hayward, California at the age of 76. His body was transferred to Afghanistan and buried in his native Kunar Province.

== Academic life ==
Mohammad Hashem wrote his initial poems in prison, assembled in the collection known as Zendani Ehsas, or The Emotion of Prison. His poems, articles and creative pieces have been extensively published in various prominent Afghan publications such as Anees, Hewad, Islah, Wranga, Sistan, Tolo-i- Afghan, Baidaar and Etifaqi-Islam.

Qutbi Khers, or Polar Bear, was Zamani's first book of the Soviet-Afghan War era. The book has been translated into English, and some portions also into French, Italian and Spanish.

=== Published books ===
- Zendani Ehsaas - (زندانى احساس)
- Zendani Khaterat - (زنداني خاطرات)
- Qutbi Khirs - (قطبي خرس)
- Loya Qurbani - (لويه قرباني)
- Sarey Khwara Bala - (سړي خوړه بلا)
- Loya Qurbani 2 Took - (لويه قرباني ٢ ټوک)
- Khwara Golona - (خواره گلونه)
- De Azadi Armaan - (دآزادۍ آرمان)
- Rosey Khamaar - (روسي ښامار)
- Zakhmey Zra - (زخمي زړه)
