= Supergame =

Supergame may refer to:

- Supergame (role-playing game)
- Supergame (finite game), in game theory
- Supergame (association football), an annual football match held in Sweden
- Super Bowl I, an American football championship game in 1967
- NBA–ABA All-Star Game, a basketball game in 1971 and 1972
