= Fred Faour =

American author and radio personality (1964–2024)

Fred M. Faour
- Born: December 18, 1964
- Died: March 14, 2024 (aged 59)
- Education: University of Houston (B.A.); University of Houston–Clear Lake (M.A.)
- Occupations: Sports commentator; Radio personality; Poker player; Horse racing Handicapper; Consultant; Instagram Model; Spokesperson
- Known for: The Blitz with Fred Faour and AJ Hoffman
- Website: Official Blog

Fred Faour (December 18, 1964 – March 14, 2024) was an American author, gambler and sports radio talk show host in Houston, Texas. Faour was a co-host on KFNC's flagship show "The Blitz" until August, 2021. Fred was previously the editor of SportsMap Houston and was a sports editor at the Houston Chronicle. He also ran Mattress Mack's defunct Houston Sports site, gallerysports.com. He hosted a podcast called FalconCast and was lead singer of the band Dead Money.

== Life and career ==
Faour was introduced into sports journalism by his parents. His late father (also named Fred Faour) worked on the Houston Chronicle sports desk for 29 years, and his mother, Pat Monych, was the first female sports editor in Texas in the early 1970s at the Texas City Sun.

Faour began his career by answering phones in the Chronicle sports department at age 16 in 1981. He then worked the agate desk five nights a week while going to college at the University of Houston. After graduating in 1987, Faour was hired as a full-time copy editor, and later promoted to Sunday sports editor in 1989. He left the Chronicle in the early 1990s and returned as a part-timer in 1995, "covering horse racing, working desk and trying all sorts of other careers on the side." Faour was hired as assistant sports editor in 1997, before being promoted to sports editor in 2005.

Faour was named the Houston Chronicle's Editor of the Year in 2002. The Chronicle's sports section was recognized as one of the best in the country under his guidance. As a horse racing writer, he won three major awards for his stories.

After the Houston Chronicle, Faour went on to expand his career into sports radio. He hosted The Front Page with co-host Matt Dean until mid-2009 when they were moved to a daily time slot and renamed The Blitz. In May 2010, A.J. Hoffman replaced Dean on The Blitz, which was on ESPN 97.5 FM (KFNC) in the Houston areas from 12:00 noon to 2:00 p.m. every weekday. Faour and Hoffman were No. 1 or 2 in the time slot for most of their tenure at midday. The duo was suspended in 2011 for an incident where they pepper sprayed their producer on air.

In October, 2012, Faour and Hoffman moved to Drive Time from 4–7:00 p.m. Central. The show was still called The Blitz. At the same time, Faour also began hosting a Saturday night show on Yahoo Sports Network from 8–10 p.m. Eastern. The show ended in April 2014.

Hoffman left the show in 2021, and Faour followed suit, announcing the creation of his new sports betting web site, SportsMap Elite, which he closed down to work with Jim "Mattress Mac" McIngvale. at Gallerysports.com

Faour also taught journalism at San Jacinto College in Pasadena, Texas, until May 2012. He also hosted and produced television sports shows and produced his own magazine, The Racing Star.

Faour was an avid gambler. His book bio states he has picked long shot Breeders' Cup winners Anees, Unbridled Elaine and Street Sense. He also qualified for the 2006 World Series of Poker Main Event online for only $9. He was also the author of the novel Jesus Just Left Chicago (2018), which he had plans to make into a film.

Faour was married and divorced three times, having two children from his second marriage.

Faour died on March 14, 2024, at the age of 59.

== Bibliography ==
Faour was the author of Acing Racing: An introductory guide to horse wagering for poker players, sports bettors and action junkies, his first published book. Acing Racing was released in late 2011 and is available in print and electronic formats. Faour also authored a novel Jesus Just Left Chicago.

=== Fiction ===
- 2018 Jesus Just Left Chicago ISBN 0578440733 Independent

=== Non-Fiction ===
- 2011 Acing Racing: An introductory guide to horse gambling for poker players, sports bettors and online action junkies, ISBN 978-1432781743 (OP).

=== Audio recordings ===
- 2015 An Introduction to Sports Betting: Blitz Style, w/ AJ Hoffman, edited and produced by Michael Carrell (Gow Media Publishing)
