= Super Match (association football) =

- Organiser(s): Manchester City F.C.
- Founded: 2004
- Abolished: 2017; 9 years ago
- Region: Worldwide
- Teams: 2
- Last champions: (England) Manchester City (2017)

The Super Match was an annual and bi-annual pre-season friendly football tournament. The tournament was previously referred to as "Thomas Cook Trophy" until 2008, "Ferrostaal Cup" in 2010, "Winoly Cup" in 2012, and "Super Match by Carlsberg", due to sponsorship. Manchester City F.C. were the hosts of the competition. The game is usually the last before the Premier League opening match and features a highly reputed UEFA club.

Manchester City played against UEFA Champions League sides Arsenal, Borussia Dortmund, Lazio, Milan, Olympiacos, Porto, VfB Stuttgart, and Valencia in previous editions of the competition.

Super Matches which did not involve Manchester City were known as SuperGames and were played in Gothenburg, Sweden.

== Tournament winners ==
Ed.	Year	Winner	Score	Runner-up
1	2004	(England) Manchester City	3–1	(Italy) Lazio
2	2005	(England) Manchester City	3–1	(Greece) Olympiacos
3	2006	(Portugal) Porto	1–0	(England) Manchester City
4	2007	(Spain) Valencia	1–0	(England) Manchester City
5	2008	(England) Manchester City	1–0	(Italy) A.C. Milan
–	2009	(not held)		
6	2010	(Germany) Borussia Dortmund	3–1	(England) Manchester City
–	2011	(not held)		
7	2012	(England) Manchester City	2–0	(England) Arsenal
8	2013	(England) Arsenal	3–1	(England) Manchester City
–	2014	(not held)		
9	2015	(Germany) VfB Stuttgart	4–2	(England) Manchester City
10	2016	(England) Arsenal	3–2	(England) Manchester City
11	2017	(England) Manchester City	3–0	(England) West Ham United

== Match details ==
=== 2004 Thomas Cook Trophy ===
7 August 2004
15:00 BST

Manchester City (England)	3–1	(Italy) Lazio
Anelka 1'; Macken 68'; Sibierski 74'	Report	Oddo 74' (pen.)

City of Manchester Stadium, Manchester
Attendance: 23,132
Referee: Matt Messias (England)

=== 2005 Thomas Cook Trophy ===
6 August 2005
15:00 BST

Manchester City (England)	3–1	(Greece) Olympiacos
Vassell 65'; Wright-Phillips 75', 79'	Report	Touré 27'

City of Manchester Stadium, Manchester
Attendance: 20,000

=== 2006 Thomas Cook Trophy ===
12 August 2006
15:00 BST

Manchester City (England)	0–1	(Portugal) Porto
	Report	Adriano 43'

City of Manchester Stadium, Manchester
Attendance: 20,375
Referee: Andre Marriner (England)

=== 2007 Thomas Cook Trophy ===
4 August 2007
15:00 BST

Manchester City (England)	0–1	(Spain) Valencia
	Report	Silva 10'

City of Manchester Stadium, Manchester
Attendance: 27,902
Referee: Mark Clattenburg (England)

=== 2008 Thomas Cook Trophy ===
9 August 2008
15:15 BST

Manchester City (England)	1–0	(Italy) Milan
Bojinov 37'	Report

City of Manchester Stadium, Manchester
Attendance: 25,181
Referee: Mark Halsey (England)

=== 2010 Ferrostaal Cup ===
4 August 2010
20:00 CEST
(19:00 BST)

Borussia Dortmund (Germany)	3–1	(England) Manchester City
Barrios 9' (pen.); Kagawa 50'; Lewandowski 81'	Report	Jô 11'

Westfalenstadion, Dortmund, Germany
Attendance: 31,200
Referee: Guido Winkmann (Germany)

=== 2012 Winoly Cup ===
27 July 2012
20:00 CST
(13:00 BST)

Manchester City (England)	2–0	(England) Arsenal
Zabaleta 42'; Y. Touré 44'	Report

Bird's Nest Stadium, Beijing, China
Attendance: 52,000
Referee: Howard Webb (England)

=== 2013 Super Match by Carlsberg ===
10 August 2013
17:00 EEST
(15:00 BST)

Manchester City (England)	1–3	(England) Arsenal
Negredo 80'	Report	Walcott 9'; Ramsey 59'; Giroud 62'

Helsinki Olympic Stadium, Helsinki, Finland
Attendance: 39,000
Referee: Mattias Gestranius (Finland)

=== 2015 Super Match ===
1 August 2015
16:00 BST

VfB Stuttgart (Germany)	4–2	(England) Manchester City
Kostić 15'; Didavi 31'; Ginczek 36', 37'	Report	Iheanacho 84'; Džeko 88'

Mercedes-Benz Arena, Stuttgart, Germany
Attendance: 40,211

=== 2016 Super Match ===
7 August 2016
17:00 CEST

Manchester City (England)	2–3	(England) Arsenal
Agüero 30'; Iheanacho 88'	Report	Iwobi 50'; Walcott 73'; Akpom 85'

Ullevi, Gothenburg, Sweden
Referee: Martin Strombergsson (Sweden)

=== 2017 Super Match ===
4 August 2017
14:00 WET

Manchester City (England)	3–0	(England) West Ham United
Gabriel Jesus 8'; Agüero 56'; Sterling 71'	Report

Laugardalsvöllur, Reykjavík, Iceland
Attendance: 6,237
Referee: Thoroddur Hjaltalin (Iceland)

== Participating teams ==
(England)	Manchester City	**2004**, **2005**, 2006, 2007, **2008**, 2010, **2012**, 2013, 2015, 2016, **2017**
(England)	Arsenal	2012, **2013**, **2016**
(Germany)	VfB Stuttgart	**2015**
(Germany)	Borussia Dortmund	**2010**
(Italy)	A.C. Milan	2008
(Spain)	Valencia	**2007**
(Portugal)	Porto	**2006**
(Greece)	Olympiacos	2005
(Italy)	Lazio	2004
(England)	West Ham United	2017

Bold indicates the participating team won the tournament that year.

== Sponsorship ==
The inaugural sponsor of the cup was travel agent Thomas Cook. In 2010, sponsorship of the competition moved to Ferrostaal, who had signed a representative deal with Manchester City. In 2012, the tournament again changed sponsors, this time to sports company "Winoly". In 2013, it was announced that Winoly had moved its sponsorship to a rival competition. On 5 June 2013, Danish Alcoholic beverage company Carlsberg took over sponsorship of the event, then known as the Super Match by Carlsberg. In 2015, there was no title sponsor for the competition.
