= Zackarias Faour =

Swedish footballer

Personal information
- Full name: Zackarias Faour
- Date of birth: 30 January 1998 (age 28)
- Place of birth: Malmö, Sweden
- Height: 1.86 m (6 ft 1 in)
- Position: Forward

Team information
- Current team: Saba Palestina

Youth career
- 2010–2014: Malmö FF
- 2014–2017: Manchester City
- 2016: → FC Midtjylland (loan)
- 2017: → FC Nordsjælland (loan)

Senior career*
Years	Team	Apps	(Gls)
2017–2018	IK Sirius	1	(1)
2018	→ Östers IF (loan)	8	(0)
2018	→ Oskarshamns AIK (loan)	0	(0)
2018–2019	Leixões	0	(0)
2019–2021	Assyriska IK	55	(8)
2022	IFK Malmö	19	(3)
2023	Torns IF	10	(0)
2024	BK Olympic	1	(0)
2024–	Saba Palestina	9	(3)

International career
2014–2015	Sweden U17	9	(0)
- * Club domestic league appearances and goals as of 17 January 2025

Zackarias Faour (born 30 January 1998) is a Swedish professional footballer who plays as a forward for Swedish club Saba Palestina. Born in Sweden, Faour is of Lebanese descent.

== Club career ==
Faour was a youth player for Manchester City.
