= Supergame (association football) =

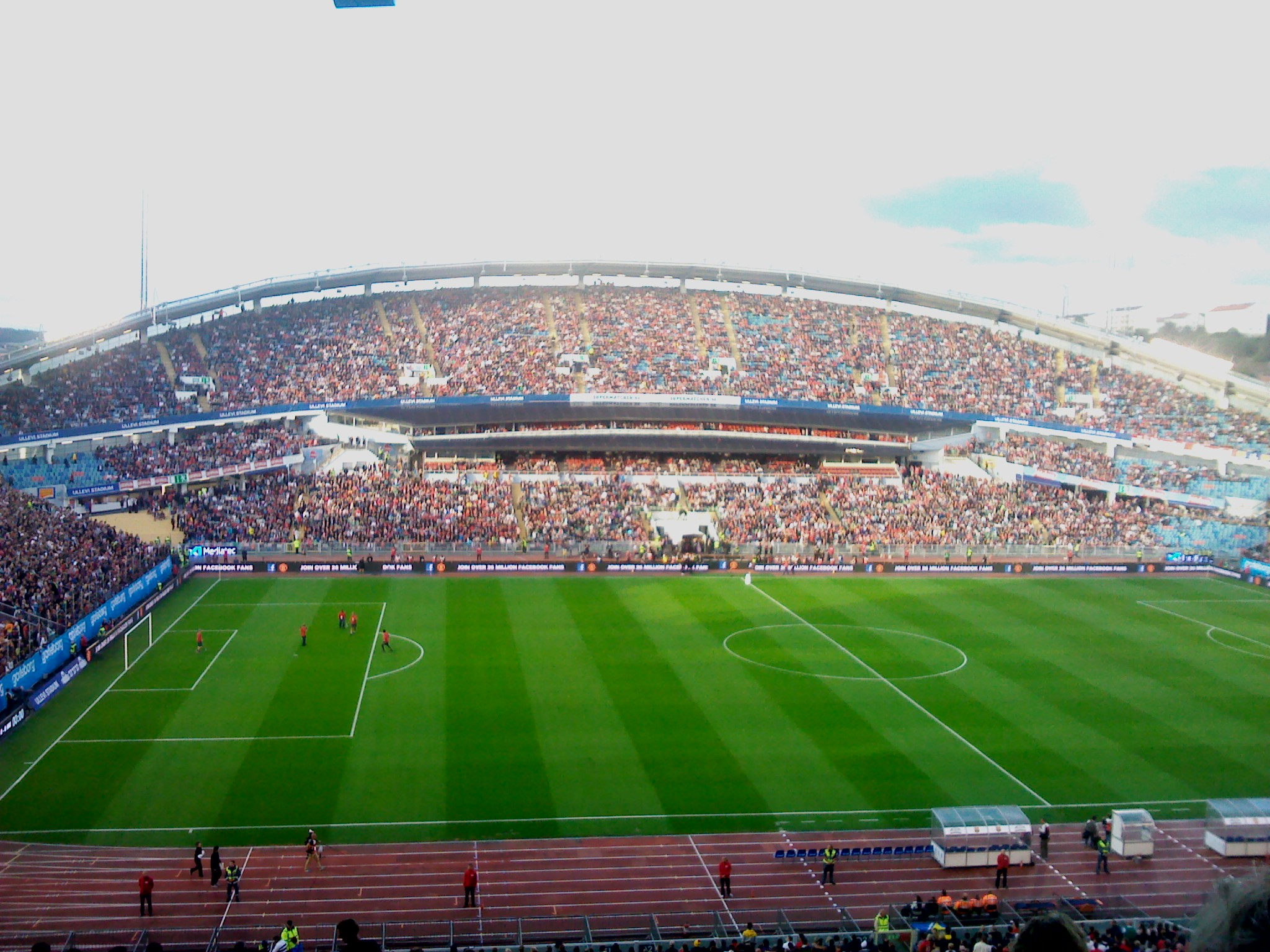
- The 2012 SuperGame
- Founded: 2012
- Region: Gothenburg, Sweden

The SuperGame (Swedish: SuperMatchen) is an annual football match at Nya Ullevi in Gothenburg, Sweden. Starting in 2012, it is usually played as a game between two top club teams in July or August. While mostly being an exhibition game it's given major attention, as its played between major clubs. Draws are followed up by penalty shootouts.

SuperGames which involve Manchester City are known as Super Matches.

== Games ==
8 August 2012	Barcelona (Spain)	0–0 (2–0 p)	(England) Manchester United	Gothenburg, Sweden
20:00 CEST	Busquets (yellow card) 70'	Report	Scholes (yellow card) 32'; Nani (yellow card) 70'	Stadium: Ullevi; Attendance: 47,141; Referee: Martin Balko (Slovakia)
	Penalties
	Xavi (penalty scored); Piqué (penalty scored)		(penalty missed) Nani; (penalty missed) Young

27 July 2013	Paris Saint-Germain (France)	0–1	(Spain) Real Madrid	Gothenburg, Sweden
20:00 CEST	Matuidi (yellow card) 24'; Verratti (yellow card) 79'	Report	Benzema 23'; Modrić (yellow card) 37'	Stadium: Ullevi; Attendance: 44,262; Referee: Michael Lerjéus (Sweden)

30 July 2016	Manchester United (England)	5–2	(Turkey) Galatasaray	Gothenburg, Sweden
19:30 CEST	Ibrahimović 4'; Rooney 55', 58' (pen.); Fellaini 62'; Mata 74'	Report	Gümüş 22'; Bruma 40'	Stadium: Ullevi; Attendance: 30,234

=== Winners list ===
Winners List
Team	Number of Wins
(England) Manchester United	1
(Spain) Real Madrid	1
(Spain) Barcelona	1
