= Anees =

Anees is a masculine given name of Arabic origin. Notable people with the name include:

== Given name ==
- Anees (horse) (1997–2003), American Thoroughbred racehorse
- Anees Ahmed (born 1962), Indian lawyer
- Anees Bazmee (born 1962), Indian film producer and director
- Anees Fatima (1901–1979), Indian freedom fighter, politician, philanthropist, and teacher
- Anees Ibrahim, Indian gangster
- Anees Jung (born 1964), Indian author and journalist
- Anees Mokhiber (born 1992), American-born Lebanese-Palestinian musician and rapper
- Anees Nadodi, Indian production designer and art director
- Anees Salim, Indian author

== See also ==
- Anis (disambiguation)
