= List of MLS drafts =

This is a list of Major League Soccer drafts. Types of Major League Soccer drafts include the MLS SuperDraft, the MLS supplemental draft and the MLS expansion draft.

== Inaugural draft ==
- 1996 MLS Inaugural Allocations
- 1996 MLS Inaugural Player Draft

== College drafts ==
- 1996 MLS College Draft
- 1997 MLS College Draft
- 1998 MLS College Draft
- 1999 MLS College Draft

== Supplemental drafts ==
- 1996 MLS supplemental draft
- 1997 MLS supplemental draft
- 1998 MLS supplemental draft
- 1999 MLS supplemental draft
- 2003 MLS supplemental draft
- 2005 MLS supplemental draft
- 2006 MLS supplemental draft
- 2007 MLS supplemental draft
- 2008 MLS supplemental draft
- 2011 MLS supplemental draft
- 2012 MLS supplemental draft
- 2013 MLS supplemental draft

== SuperDrafts ==
- 2000 MLS SuperDraft
- 2001 MLS SuperDraft
- 2002 MLS SuperDraft
- 2003 MLS SuperDraft
- 2004 MLS SuperDraft
- 2005 MLS SuperDraft
- 2006 MLS SuperDraft
- 2007 MLS SuperDraft
- 2008 MLS SuperDraft
- 2009 MLS SuperDraft
- 2010 MLS SuperDraft
- 2011 MLS SuperDraft
- 2012 MLS SuperDraft
- 2013 MLS SuperDraft
- 2014 MLS SuperDraft
- 2015 MLS SuperDraft
- 2016 MLS SuperDraft
- 2017 MLS SuperDraft
- 2018 MLS SuperDraft
- 2019 MLS SuperDraft
- 2020 MLS SuperDraft
- 2021 MLS SuperDraft
- 2022 MLS SuperDraft
- 2023 MLS SuperDraft
- 2024 MLS SuperDraft
- 2025 MLS SuperDraft

== Contraction drafts ==
- 2002 MLS Allocation Draft
- 2002 MLS Dispersal Draft
- 2014 MLS Dispersal Draft

== Expansion drafts ==
- 1997 MLS expansion draft
- 2004 MLS expansion draft
- 2006 MLS expansion draft
- 2007 MLS expansion draft
- 2008 MLS expansion draft
- 2009 MLS expansion draft
- 2010 MLS expansion draft
- 2011 MLS expansion draft
- 2014 MLS expansion draft
- 2016 MLS expansion draft
- 2017 MLS expansion draft
- 2018 MLS expansion draft
- 2019 MLS expansion draft
- 2020 MLS expansion draft
- 2021 MLS expansion draft
- 2022 MLS expansion draft
- 2024 MLS expansion draft

== Re-entry drafts ==
- 2010 MLS Re-Entry Draft
- 2011 MLS Re-Entry Draft
- 2012 MLS Re-Entry Draft
- 2013 MLS Re-Entry Draft
- 2014 MLS Re-Entry Draft
- 2015 MLS Re-Entry Draft
- 2016 MLS Re-Entry Draft
- 2017 MLS Re-Entry Draft
- 2018 MLS Re-Entry Draft
- 2019 MLS Re-Entry Draft
- 2020 MLS Re-Entry Draft
- 2021 MLS Re-Entry Draft
- 2022 MLS Re-Entry Draft
- 2023 MLS Re-Entry Draft
- 2024 MLS Re-Entry Draft
- 2025 MLS Re-Entry Draft
