= Josh Bauer =

Josh Bauer may refer to:

- Josh Bauer (24), a character from the TV series 24
- Josh Bauer (soccer) (born 1998), American soccer player
