= Kendall McIntosh =

American soccer player (born 1994)

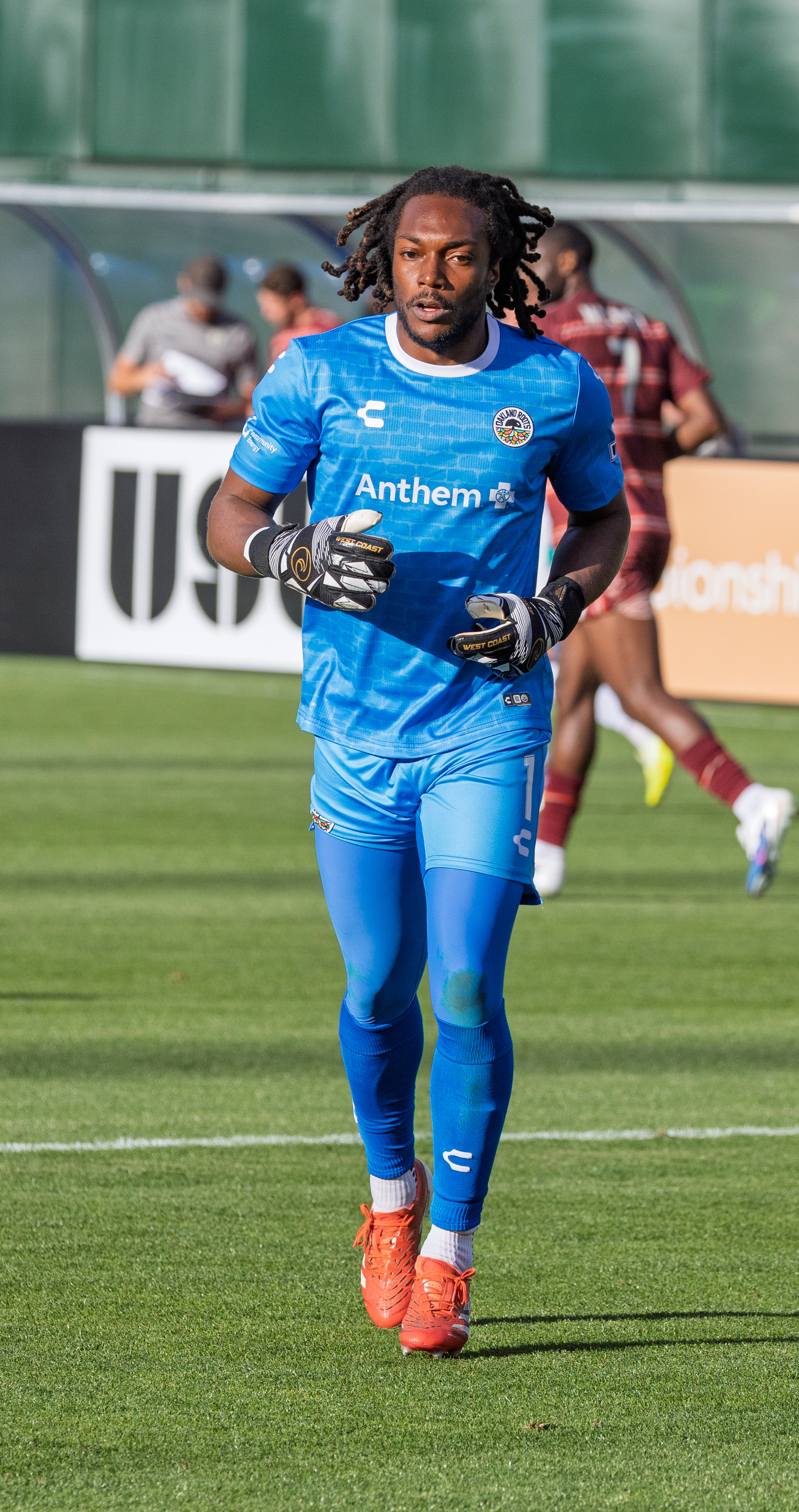
- McIntosh in 2026

Personal information
- Full name: Kendall Isaiah McIntosh
- Date of birth: January 24, 1994 (age 32)
- Place of birth: Oakland, California, United States
- Height: 1.84 m (6 ft 0 in)
- Position: Goalkeeper

Team information
- Current team: Oakland Roots
- Number: 1

Youth career
- 2010–2011: San Jose Earthquakes

College career
Years	Team	Apps	(Gls)
2012–2015	Santa Clara Broncos	54	(0)

Senior career*
Years	Team	Apps	(Gls)
2014	FC Tucson	1	(0)
2015	Burlingame Dragons	1	(0)
2016–2019	Portland Timbers 2	60	(0)
2017–2019	Portland Timbers	0	(0)
2020	New York Red Bulls	0	(0)
2021–2023	Sporting Kansas City	16	(0)
2021–2023	Sporting Kansas City II	26	(0)
2024	San Antonio FC	9	(0)
2025–	Oakland Roots	43	(0)

International career^{‡}
2011	United States U17	4	(0)
2012–2013	United States U20	10	(0)
Medal record
Representing United States
Runner-up	CONCACAF U-20 Championship	2013
- * Club domestic league appearances and goals as of October 31, 2026 ‡ National team caps and goals as of September 23, 2022

Kendall Isaiah McIntosh (born January 24, 1994) is an American professional soccer player who plays as a goalkeeper for USL Championship club Oakland Roots SC.

== Career ==
=== Youth, college and amateur ===
McIntosh was a member of the San Jose Earthquakes Academy before spending his entire college career at Santa Clara University. He made a total 53 appearances for the Broncos between 2012 and 2015.

He also played in the Premier Development League for FC Tucson and Burlingame Dragons.

=== Portland Timbers ===
On March 18, 2016, McIntosh signed a professional contract with USL club Portland Timbers 2. He made his league debut for the reserve side on 23 April 2016 in a 2–0 away victory against Tulsa Roughnecks FC. He picked up a yellow card in the 19th minute.

=== New York Red Bulls ===
On 26 November 2019, McIntosh was selected by New York Red Bulls in Stage 1 of the 2019 MLS Re-Entry Draft. On December 21, 2021, McIntosh was named New York Red Bulls Humanitarian of the Year for his work responding to issues of racism and social injustice as well as his fundraising for the NAACP Legal Defense and Educational Fund, the National Black Child Developmental Institute and the Thurgood Marshall College Fund. McIntosh was released by New York following the 2020 season.

=== Sporting Kansas City ===
On 17 December 2020, McIntosh was selected by Sporting Kansas City in Stage 1 of the 2020 MLS Re-Entry Draft, officially signing with the club on January 5, 2021. After featuring prominently for Sporting Kansas City II throughout the 2021 season, McIntosh signed a new contract for the 2022 Major League Soccer season with an option for 2023.

=== San Antonio FC ===
On February 14, 2024, McIntosh signed with USL Championship side San Antonio FC.

== International ==
McIntosh has represented the United States in the U17 and U20 level.
