= Tyrone Mears =

English football player (born 1983)

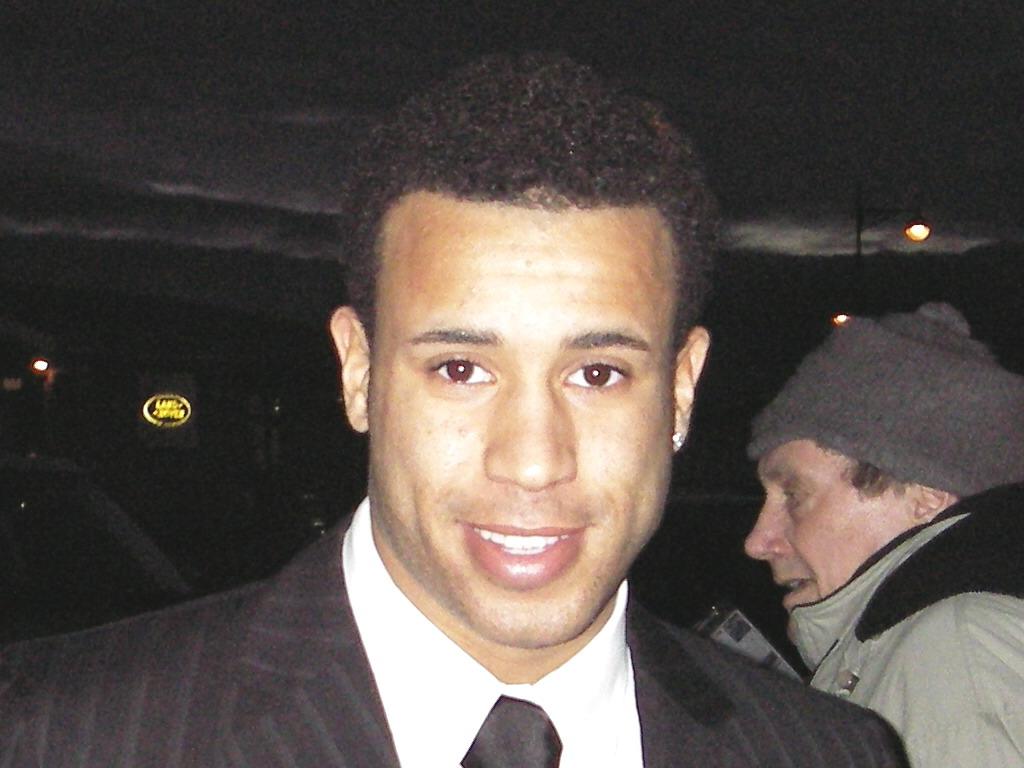
- Mears in 2007

Personal information
- Full name: Tyrone Robert Mears
- Date of birth: 18 February 1983 (age 43)
- Place of birth: Stockport, England
- Height: 5 ft 11 in (1.80 m)
- Position: Right-back

Youth career
- –2001: Manchester City

Senior career*
Years	Team	Apps	(Gls)
2001–2002	Manchester City	1	(0)
2002–2006	Preston North End	70	(4)
2006–2007	West Ham United	5	(0)
2007	→ Derby County (loan)	13	(1)
2007–2009	Derby County	28	(1)
2008–2009	→ Marseille (loan)	4	(0)
2009–2011	Burnley	82	(1)
2011–2014	Bolton Wanderers	28	(0)
2014–2016	Seattle Sounders FC	74	(1)
2017	Atlanta United FC	21	(1)
2017–2018	Minnesota United FC	11	(1)
2018–2019	West Bromwich Albion	9	(0)
Total		346	(10)

International career
2009	Jamaica	1	(0)

Managerial career
- 2024–2025: Fort Lauderdale United
- 2026: Fort Lauderdale United
- * Club domestic league appearances and goals

Tyrone Robert Mears (born 18 February 1983) is an English football coach and former professional player who played as a right-back. The clubs he played for include Bolton Wanderers, Preston North End, West Ham United, Derby County, Olympique de Marseille, Burnley, Seattle Sounders FC, Atlanta United FC, Minnesota United FC, and West Bromwich Albion. From Stockport in the north west of England, Mears once played for the Jamaica national football team despite not being eligible to do so. Mears has twice been the head coach of USL Super League club Fort Lauderdale United.

== Club career ==
=== Manchester City ===
Mears came through the ranks at Manchester City and signed trainee forms in August 2001. Mears only made one appearance for City, replacing Stuart Pearce as a substitute in the 84th minute against Nottingham Forest in March 2002. On Manchester City's promotion to the FA Premier League in 2002, Mears' first-team opportunities became limited and he was sold to Preston North End.

=== Preston North End ===
Mears joined Preston in July 2002, for a fee of £200,000. He signed a three-year contract and was expected to provide cover for Graham Alexander.

After missing out the start of the season, due to a thigh injury he suffered in the pre-season training, Mears made his debut for Preston as a substitute in a 3–3 draw with Walsall on 19 October 2002, After playing in the reserves for a while, Mears played his first match in months against Grimsby Town on 14 December 2002. It wasn't until on 15 April 2003 when he scored his first goal for the club, in a 5–1 loss against Reading. Though Manager Craig Brown expressed disappointment over the results, he singled out praises to Mears, including his "spectacular". In his first season at Preston North End, Mears went on to make a total of 24 league and cup appearances in the 2002–03 season, as Preston finished in mid-table of the Football League Championship.

In the 2003–04 season, Mears struggled to regain his first team, as he suffered a hamstring that kept him sidelined at the start of the season. It wasn't until on 27 September 2003 when he made his first appearance of the season, in a 2–1 loss against Walsall. However, he struggled to continue to in the first team, as he compete with Graham Alexander and Rob Edwards over the wing-backs position. Despite this, Mears scored his first goal of the season on 10 March 2004, in a 3–3 draw against Sunderland and only made 14 appearances. Nevertheless, Mears was awarded the club's most improved player this season.

However, in the 2004–05 season, Mears suffered a stress fracture in the pre-season training, which put him out of the game for ten months. Despite his long-term injury, he was offered and signed a further three-year contract in March 2005, saying "I was out for 10 months so you worry about what is going to happen to you. You need to be in the team but Preston have been very good to me and I can't speak more highly of the manager. Last season to get the stress fracture was very hard but that's all behind me now and I'm looking forward to a fresh start with a three-year deal." Mears made his return from the first team on 16 April 2005, coming on as late a substitute, in a 3–0 win over Cardiff City and went on to make five appearances in the 2004–05 season.

After suffering from injury at the start of the 2005–06 season, Mears managed to regain his first team place since returning from the first team and then scored his first goal of the season on 18 October 2005, in a 2–2 draw against Cardiff City. His second goal then came on 11 February 2006, in a 5–1 win over Luton Town. He made 39 league and cup appearances in the 2005–06 season as Preston reached the Championship play-offs semi-final. During that season, instead of having his surname Mears on the back of his shirt, he had his nickname "Tye", a rare occurrence in English football.

In July 2006, after rejecting two bids from Charlton Athletic, Preston accepted an offer for Mears from West Ham United.

=== West Ham United ===
Mears signed for West Ham for an initial £1 million in July 2006, rising to £1.9 million depending on appearances and possible future international recognition with England. Mears made his West Ham United debut on 19 August 2006, in a 3–1 win over Charlton Athletic, in the opening game of the season and then a month later, he played his first European match on 14 September 2006, playing the whole game, in a 1–0 loss against Palermo.

However, he was only to make six league and cup appearances for West Ham as he struggled to break into the first team. He memorably produced an athletic overhead clearance on the line, after Stiliyan Petrov lobbed West Ham keeper Roy Carroll in a match against Aston Villa in September 2006.

==== Loan to Derby County ====
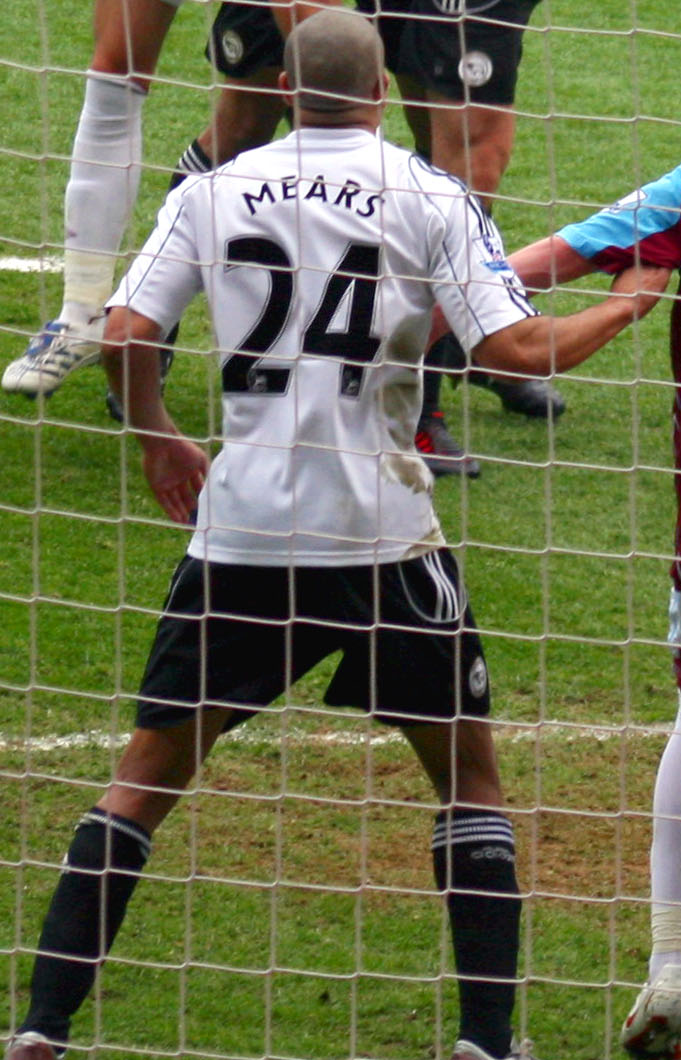
Mears playing for Derby County in 2008

With his opportunities in the West Ham first-team limited, he was allowed to join Derby County on loan until the end of the 2006–07 season in January 2007. Derby manager, Billy Davies, who had managed Mears at his previous club Preston, said of him, ""He is a very attacking full-back with excellent pace who adds great competition. Ideally we would like to make this deal permanent in the summer."

Mears made his debut as an 84th-minute substitute in a 1–0 win at Southampton on 3 February, and went on to make a total of 17 league and cup appearances, as Derby were promoted to the Premier League after beating West Bromwich Albion in the Championship play-off final in May. He went on to make seventeen appearances for the club in the 2006–07 season, during which Mears scored his first goal for Derby against Leeds United in a 2–0 win on the last day of the 2006–07 season.

=== Derby County ===
Mears then joined Derby permanently for £1 million on 4 July 2007, signing a three-year contract. Manager Billy Davies said, ""We're delighted with this deal. Tye is a very good young full back with excellent pace and potential. We need him for the challenge ahead and I know he is committed to working hard." Mears' first game after signing for the club on a permanent basis came on 11 August 2007, in a 2–2 draw against Portsmouth in the opening game of the season. However, a stress fracture sustained in January 2008 ruled him out for three months of the 2007–08 season. Mears made his return from injury against Fulham on 29 March 2008, coming on as a late substitute, in a 2–2 draw, a game that saw Derby County relegated to the Championship next season. Despite this, Mears scored his second goal for Derby on 19 April 2008 against his former club West Ham United, which saw them lose 2–1 and made 26 appearances (25 in the league and once in the FA Cup) in all competitions.

Following the club's relegation to the Championship, Mears switched number shirt from 24 to 15 after Miles Addison took his shirt. At the start of the season, Mears competed with Paul Connolly over the right-back position and played first five matches to the start of the season in all competitions.

==== Loan to Marseille ====
On 29 August 2008, Mears caused controversy when he flew to France to go on trial with Olympique de Marseille without the express permission of Derby manager Paul Jewell. Jewell responded, saying that Mears would never play for the club again whilst he was in charge, and the club fined Mears six weeks wages. Following the trial, the clubs agreed that Mears would go on loan to Marseille for the duration of the 2008–09 season, for a loan fee of £160,000, with the French club having the option to buy him for £1.5m at the end of the loan.

A combination of injury and the good form of Laurent Bonnart meant that Mears did not make his first appearance for Marseille until the UEFA Cup tie against FC Twente in mid-January. Following an injury in March that ruled Bonnart out for the rest of the season, Mears filled in at right-back in his absence. He made his league debut against Paris Saint-Germain. His first goal for Marseille came in the second leg of a UEFA Cup knockout-stage match against Ajax. His goal, scored in the 20th minute of extra time, gave Marseille a 4–3 win on aggregate, allowing the team to progress to the competition's quarter-final round. Mears went on to make seven appearances in all competitions. Marseille decided not to take up the option of signing him at the end of his loan spell and he returned to Derby on 3 June 2009, with his future at the club in doubt.

=== Burnley ===
On 26 June 2009, he was the subject of an accepted £500,000 (rising to £600,000 with add-ons) bid from Premier League side Burnley. He completed the move, signing a three-year deal on 30 June.

Mears made his Burnley debut in a 2–0 defeat at Stoke City in the opening game of the season, followed up by bouncing back in the next game, with a 1–0 victory over defending champions, Manchester United. Mears then provided an assist to help the club score two goals, in a 2–0 win over Hull City on 31 October 2009. After the match, Mears' performance was praised by Manager Owen Coyle. His performances also saw him being linked with a move to Premier League rivals' Sunderland, but this was denied by the club. Despite this, Mears stayed at the club and played in all 38 games as Burnley were relegated after finishing 18th in the 2009–10 Premier League and accumulated just 30 points. Nevertheless, Mears was awarded South West Clarets Player of the season, Accrington Clarets Player of the season and Earby Clarets Player of the season.

Following relegation, Mears began looking for a move away from Turf Moor due to his desire to remain in the top flight. Despite this, Mears stayed at the club throughout the summer and despite the club's good start to the 2010–11 season, Mears was suspended twice after picking up a yellow card against Nottingham Forest in the opening game of the season and another, which saw him earned a second yellow card, in a 1–0 loss against Swansea City on 28 August 2010. Despite the suspension, Mears continued to be in the regular first team at Burnley and scored his first goal for Burnley in a 2–1 win over his former club Derby County on 27 November 2010. In a match against Port Vale in the third round of FA Cup, Mears scored his second goal of the season and setting up one of the goals, in a 4–2 win. He went on to finish the 2010–11 season, making 49 appearances (44 in the league) and scoring two times in all competitions.

=== Bolton Wanderers ===
On 29 July 2011, Mears, along with Burnley teammate Chris Eagles, joined Bolton Wanderers on a three-year contract for a joint fee in the region of £3 million.

However, on 4 August he broke his leg in a training session. Manager Owen Coyle later said he expected Mears to be absent for a minimum of five months. On 24 January 2012, Mears played his first full ninety minutes since his injury in the Reserve team's 1–0 defeat to Sunderland Reserves, he was an unused substitute in Bolton's 2–1 FA Cup win over Swansea City on 28 January. He made his full debut for the club when being named in the starting line up for the game at Norwich City on 4 February, which Bolton eventually lost 2–0. However, following the game Mears complained about a pain in the leg that had been broken the previous August and, after a screw was removed from the leg, manager Owen Coyle said he expected Mears to be out of action until late March. Afterwards, Mears didn't make another appearance for the rest of the season.

In the 2012–13 season, Mears played his first match of the season in the opening game, making his first start since returning from injury, in a 2–0 loss against Burnley. Since making his return, Mears became a first team regular until he was dropped from the first team by new Manager Dougie Freedman, but managed to regain his first team place soon after. Mears then set up one of the goals on 29 December 2012, in a 3–1 win over Birmingham City. However, as the 2012–13 season progressed, Mears suffered blood infection at first and then suffered glandular fever that kept him out for the rest of the season. Despite this, Mears went on to finish the 2012–13 season, making twenty-eight appearances in all competitions.

In the 2013–14 season, Mears recovered from injury and having fallen out of favor under the management of Freedman, Mears was expected to leave the club in the summer, but stayed. By August, Mears made three appearances, playing twice in the League and once in the league against Blackburn Rovers on 31 August 2013. Afterwards, Mears never made another appearance again, as he remained out of favor by Freedman throughout the season, having become the club's third choice right-back this season. At one point, Mears was set to join Blackpool on loan, but the move was in doubt, as he rejected the move. At the end of the 2013–14 season he was released by the club along with Chris Eagles, Zat Knight and Jay Lynch.

=== Seattle Sounders FC ===
On 29 December 2014, Mears joined Seattle Sounders FC of Major League Soccer. Terms of the deal were not disclosed per Major League Soccer's policy.

Mears made his Sounders debut, in the opening game of the season, where he set up one of the goals, in a 3–0 win over New England Revolution. For his performance, Mears was named in the MLS Team of the Week. It wasn't until on 4 July 2015 when he scored his first goal for the club, in a 1–0 win over D.C. United. Mears established himself in the right-back position throughout the season and made 37 appearances (34 in the league) in all competitions, as he helped finished fourth place in Western Conference, sixth place overall, and reach the play-offs in the semi-final.

In 2016 season, Mears continued to established himself in the first team as a right-back position despite suffering from injury at the start of the season. Shortly after recovering from a hamstring, Mears made his first appearance for the club this season on 12 March 2016, in a 2–1 loss against Real Salt Lake. Mears went on to make 32 league appearances despite missing out 1 match, due to tactical changes at one point against FC Dallas on 14 July 2016. Mears then helped the club reach the final of the MLS Cup to play against Toronto FC and played the whole 120 minutes throughout extra time as a right-back and win the Cup after beating Toronto 5–4 in the penalty shootout. Just one day after winning the Cup, Seattle Sounders declined Mears' contract option for 2017.

=== Atlanta United FC ===
After his release from Seattle, Mears' rights were traded to Atlanta United FC in exchange for $50,000 of general allocation money. Mears was released by Atlanta at the end of their 2017 season.

=== Minnesota United ===
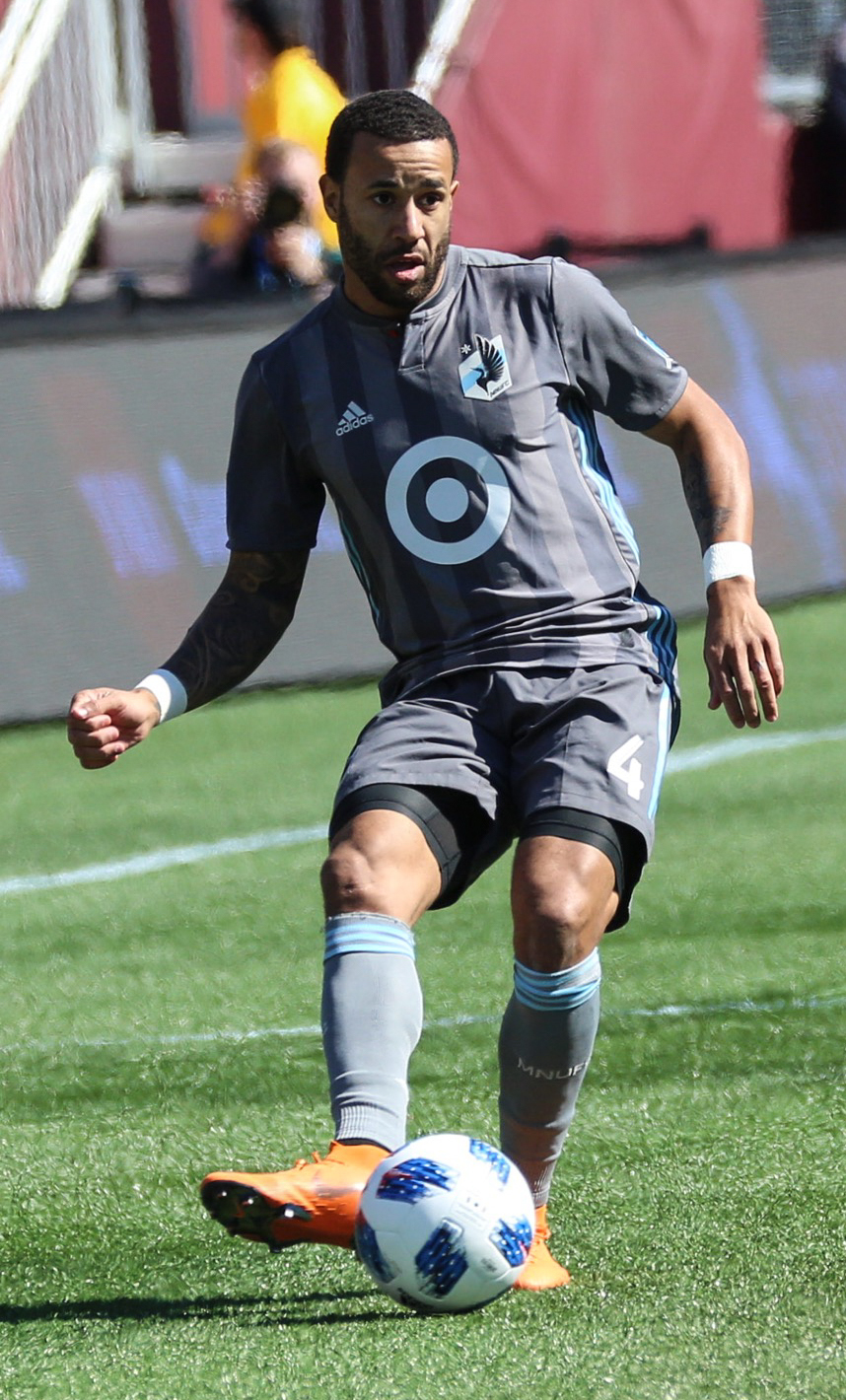
Mears playing for Minnesota United FC in 2018

Following his release by Atlanta, Mears entered the 2017 MLS Re-Entry Draft on 15 December 2017. He was selected by Minnesota United FC in the first round. He and the team mutually agreed to part ways in late August.

=== West Bromwich Albion ===
On 28 August 2018, Mears returned to England signing for West Bromwich Albion on a short-term contract until 1 January 2019. He made his debut on the same day, playing against Mansfield Town in the EFL Cup in a 2–1 win. His deal was later extended by another month to run until the end of January 2019. On 1 February 2019, his deal was extended again until the end of the 2018–19 season. He was released at the end of the season in July 2019.

By October 2020, Mears was retired.

== International career ==
Born and raised in England, Mears believed he had Jamaican ancestry and it was reported on 4 February 2009, that he had accepted an offer to play for the Jamaica national football team. Mears made his debut on 11 February 2009 in a friendly match against Nigeria, playing 71 minutes of the 0–0 draw at the New Den. Mears said, "It was a fantastic feeling to be selected. When John Barnes first phoned me I was really excited. It's a fantastic opportunity to play for Jamaica." Despite making an appearance for Jamaica, it was later reported that Mears' father, whom he thought he qualified through, may actually be from Sierra Leone. An official from the Jamaica Football Federation stated that Jamaica fielded Mears without undergoing thorough checks because verification of a player's passport is not required for friendly internationals and such matches do not affect a player's international eligibility.

After discovering his ineligibility to play for Jamaica, Mears petitioned FIFA to have the cap rescinded and have his ongoing eligibility to play for England reaffirmed.

== Coaching career ==
In March 2023, Mears joined the staff of the Inter Miami CF Academy, primarily as an assistant coach for the club's U-17 side.

On 25 January 2024, Mears was announced as the first-ever head coach for the USL Super League club to be based in Fort Lauderdale, Florida. Mears led Fort Lauderdale United to the first-ever league championship match, falling to in-state rivals Tampa Bay Sun. In September 2025, Mears was promoted to president of soccer for the club, where he oversaw all sporting operations for Fort Lauderdale men's and women's sides. After spending one season as president, Mears was announced to be returning to a head coaching role in June 2026. On 6 October 2026, Mears parted ways with Fort Lauderdale United.

== Personal life ==
Mears is studying a course in criminal justice and counter-terrorism at Southern New Hampshire University via online. Mears is a father of four children, and his spouse is Nadine Mears. Mears revealed he left school when he was 15 to pursue his football career.

Mears holds a U.S. green card which qualifies him as a domestic player for MLS roster purposes.

His son, Jaden, plays for Stoke City.

== Career statistics ==
=== Club ===
Appearances and goals by club, season and competition
Club	Season	League			National Cup		League Cup		Other		Total	
Club	Season	Division	Apps	Goals	Apps	Goals	Apps	Goals	Apps	Goals	Apps	Goals
Manchester City	2000–01	Premier League	0	0	0	0	0	0	—		0	0
Manchester City	2001–02	First Division	1	0	0	0	0	0	—		1	0
Manchester City	Total		1	0	0	0	0	0	—		1	0
Preston North End	2002–03	First Division	22	1	1	0	2	0	—		25	1
Preston North End	2003–04	First Division	12	1	1	0	1	0	—		14	1
Preston North End	2004–05	Championship	4	0	1	0	0	0	0	0	5	0
Preston North End	2005–06	Championship	32	2	4	0	1	0	2 (Note: Appearances in Football League Championship play-offs)	0	39	2
Preston North End	Total		70	4	7	0	4	0	2	0	83	4
West Ham United	2006–07	Premier League	5	0	0	0	0	0	1 (Note: Appearance(s) in UEFA Cup)	0	6	0
Derby County	2006–07	Championship	13	1	1	0	0	0	3	0	17	1
Derby County	2007–08	Premier League	25	1	1	0	0	0	—		26	1
Derby County	2008–09	Championship	3	0	0	0	2	0	—		5	0
Derby County	Total		41	2	2	0	2	0	3	0	48	2
Marseille	2008–09	Ligue 1	4	0	—		—		3	1	7	1
Burnley	2009–10	Premier League	38	0	1	0	0	0	—		39	0
Burnley	2010–11	Championship	44	1	3	1	2	0	—		49	2
Burnley	Total		82	1	4	1	2	0	—		88	2
Bolton Wanderers	2011–12	Premier League	1	0	0	0	0	0	—		1	0
Bolton Wanderers	2012–13	Championship	26	0	2	0	0	0	—		28	0
Bolton Wanderers	2013–14	Championship	1	0	0	0	2	0	—		3	0
Bolton Wanderers	Total		28	0	2	0	2	0	—		32	0
Seattle Sounders FC	2015	Major League Soccer	36	1	1	0	—		2 (Note: Appearances in CONCACAF Champions League)	0	39	1
Seattle Sounders FC	2016	Major League Soccer	38	0	0	0	—		2	0	40	0
Seattle Sounders FC	Total		74	1	1	0	0	0	4	0	79	1
Atlanta United FC	2017	Major League Soccer	21	1	1	0	—		—		22	1
Minnesota United FC	2018	Major League Soccer	11	1	2	0	—		—		13	1
West Bromwich Albion	2018–19	Championship	9	0	2	0	2	0	1	0	14	0
Career total			346	10	21	1	11	0	14	1	393	12

=== International ===
Appearances and goals by national team and year
National team	Year	Apps	Goals
Jamaica	2009	1	0
Total		1	0

== Honours ==
Derby County

- Football League Championship play-offs: 2007

Seattle Sounders FC

- MLS Cup: 2016
