= 2025 MLS Re-Entry Draft =

College draft for soccer teams

General information
- Dates: Stage 1: December 11, 2025; Stage 2: December 17, 2025

Overview
- League: Major League Soccer
- Teams: 30

The 2025 MLS Re-Entry Draft was conducted in two stages, as it has been in previous years. Stage 1 took place on December 11, 2025, and Stage 2 took place on December 17, 2025. All Major League Soccer clubs took part of the 2025 MLS Re-Entry Draft. The draft order was set in reverse order of the 2025 Major League Soccer season standing after completion of the 2025 MLS Cup Playoffs.

== Rules ==
Players 22 years of age or older, with one year in the MLS, who do not have a current contract or Bona Fide Offer are eligible for the 2025 MLS Re-Entry Draft. Players may opt out of the draft by submitting a written notice to the league. If a player opts out the current club will maintain Right to First Refusal and must have players consent to trade the player.

If a club chooses a player in stage 1 of the Re-Entry draft, that club must either exercise an option for that player or extend them a Bona Fide offer. Clubs may not select any player from their own club who are eligible to be part of the Re-Entry draft. If a player is selected in the Re-Entry draft, and they have a current option on their contract, they will be automatically added to the drafting club's roster. If a club makes a Bona Fide Offer, and the selected player rejects the offer, the drafting club maintains the Right to First Refusal for that player in Major League Soccer.

Any player not selected by a team in Stage 1 of the Re-Entry draft are available in Stage 2. If a club selects a player in Stage 2 they have seven days to make an offer to the player. If the club and player cannot reach an agreement, the club retains the Right to First Refusal in Major League Soccer. In Stage 2, clubs may not select their own players until all other clubs decline to select player.

== Stage One ==
Pick #	Drafting Team	Player	Position	Former Team
1	D.C. United	PASS		
2	Atlanta United FC	PASS		
3	CF Montréal	PASS		
4	Sporting Kansas City	PASS		
5	LA Galaxy	PASS		
6	Toronto FC	PASS		
7	St. Louis City SC	PASS		
8	New England Revolution	PASS		
9	Houston Dynamo FC	PASS		
10	Colorado Rapids	PASS		
11	San Jose Earthquakes	PASS		
12	New York Red Bulls	PASS		
13	Real Salt Lake	PASS		
14	Orlando City SC	PASS		
15	Portland Timbers	PASS		
16	FC Dallas	PASS		
17	Austin FC	PASS		
18	Chicago Fire FC	PASS		
19	Columbus Crew	PASS		
20	Nashville SC	PASS		
21	Seattle Sounders FC	PASS		
22	Charlotte FC	PASS		
23	Minnesota United FC	PASS		
24	Los Angeles FC	PASS		
25	FC Cincinnati	PASS		
26	Philadelphia Union	PASS		
27	New York City FC	PASS		
28	San Diego FC	PASS		
29	Vancouver Whitecaps FC	PASS		
30	Inter Miami CF	PASS		

== Stage Two ==
Pick #	Drafting Team	Player	Position	Former Team
1	D.C. United	(United States) Gabriel Segal	FW	Houston Dynamo FC
2	Atlanta United FC	PASS		
3	CF Montréal	PASS		
4	Sporting Kansas City	PASS		
5	LA Galaxy	PASS		
6	Toronto FC	PASS		
7	St. Louis City SC	PASS		
8	New England Revolution	PASS		
9	Houston Dynamo FC	PASS		
10	Colorado Rapids	PASS		
11	San Jose Earthquakes	PASS		
12	New York Red Bulls	PASS		
13	Real Salt Lake	(Denmark) Lukas Engel	DF	FC Cincinnati
14	Orlando City SC	PASS		
15	Portland Timbers	PASS		
16	FC Dallas	PASS		
17	Austin FC	PASS		
18	Chicago Fire FC	PASS		
19	Columbus Crew	PASS		
20	Nashville SC	PASS		
21	Seattle Sounders FC	PASS		
22	Charlotte FC	PASS		
23	Minnesota United FC	PASS		
24	Los Angeles FC	PASS		
25	FC Cincinnati	PASS		
26	Philadelphia Union	PASS		
27	New York City FC	PASS		
28	San Diego FC	PASS		
29	Vancouver Whitecaps FC	PASS		
30	Inter Miami CF	PASS		
