= Josh Bauer (soccer) =

American soccer player (born 1998)

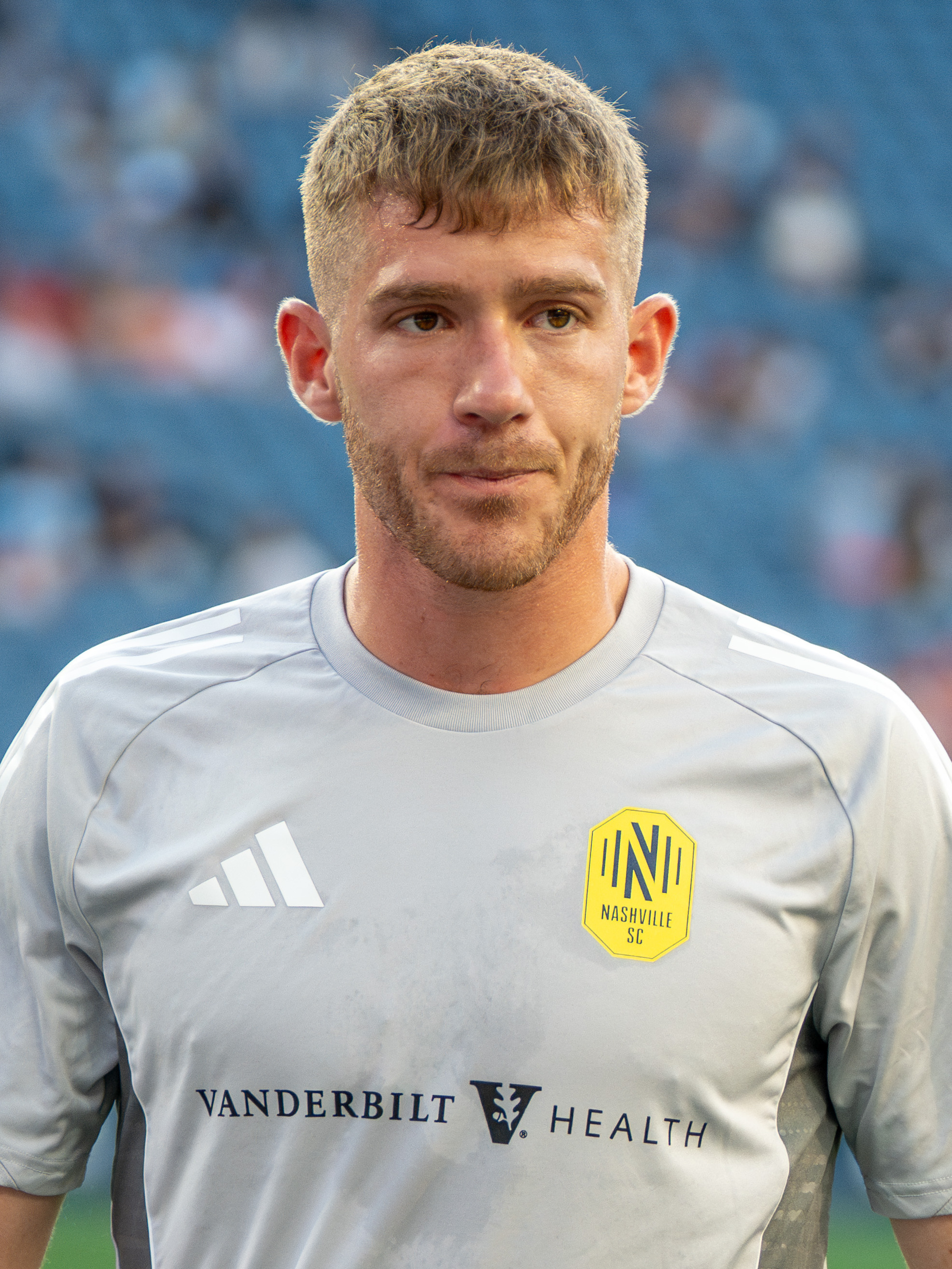
- Bauer with Nashville SC in 2025

Personal information
- Full name: Joshua Chase Bauer
- Date of birth: July 22, 1998 (age 28)
- Place of birth: Bedford, New Hampshire, U.S.
- Height: 6 ft 2 in (1.88 m)
- Position: Defender

Team information
- Current team: Nashville SC
- Number: 22

Youth career
- GPS New Hampshire Classics Elite

College career
Years	Team	Apps	(Gls)
2017–2019	New Hampshire Wildcats	60	(10)

Senior career*
Years	Team	Apps	(Gls)
2017	Seacoast United Phantoms	0	(0)
2018	Boston Bolts	10	(1)
2019	Seattle Sounders FC U-23	10	(1)
2020	Birmingham Legion	3	(0)
2021	Atlanta United	0	(0)
2021	Atlanta United 2	27	(1)
2022–	Nashville SC	36	(0)
2022	→ Sacramento Republic (loan)	11	(0)
2023	Huntsville City	1	(0)
- * Club domestic league appearances and goals as of October 24, 2024

Joshua Chase Bauer (born July 22, 1998) is an American professional soccer player who plays as a center-back for Major League Soccer club Nashville SC.

== Career ==
=== Youth, college & amateur ===
Bauer played youth soccer with GPS New Hampshire Classics Elite, helping them to a pair of state titles in 2014 and 2015. He then went on to play college soccer at the University of New Hampshire between 2017 and 2019. Whilst with the Wildcats, Bauer made 60 appearances, scoring 10 goals and tallying 10 assists.

He was named a United Soccer Coaches First Team All-American in his senior season and was a 2019 MAC Hermann Trophy Semifinalist. He also won accolades such as America East Defender of the Year, ECAC Defender of the Year in 2018 and 2019, and is only the second player ever to be named the America East Tournament Most Outstanding Player twice. He was also a 2018 United Soccer Coaches Second Team All-American and a United Soccer Coaches First Team Scholar Athlete in 2019.

Whilst at college, Bauer also played in the USL League Two with spells at Seacoast United Phantoms, Boston Bolts and Seattle Sounders FC U-23.

=== Professional ===
On August 19, 2020, Bauer signed his first professional contract with USL Championship side Birmingham Legion. He made his professional debut on August 29, 2020, appearing as an 84th-minute substitute during a 4–1 win over Charlotte Independence. He was out of contract following the 2020 season to be able to participate in the 2021 MLS SuperDraft.

On January 21, 2021, Bauer was selected 31st overall in the 2021 MLS SuperDraft by Atlanta United. He officially signed a first team contract on April 15, 2021.

Following the 2021 season, Bauer's contract option was declined by Atlanta. On December 17, 2021, he was selected in Stage One of the 2021 MLS Re-Entry Draft by Nashville SC.

Bauer joined Sacramento Republic on a short-term loan on July 29, 2022.
