= 2022 MLS Re-Entry Draft =

College draft for soccer teams

General information
- Date(s): Stage 1: November 17, 2022; Stage 2: November 22, 2022

Overview
- League: Major League Soccer
- Teams: 29

The 2022 MLS Re-Entry Draft was conducted in two stages, as it has been in previous years. Stage 1 took place on November 17, 2022, and Stage 2 took place on November 22, 2022. All 28 existing Major League Soccer club and its newest expansion club St. Louis City SC took place in the 2022 MLS Re-Entry Draft. The draft order was set in reverse order of the 2022 Major League Soccer season standing after completion of the 2022 MLS Cup Playoffs. Because St. Louis City SC did not participate in the 2022 MLS season, they would have the last position in the 2022 MLS Re-Entry Draft. Teams have the option to decline a selection throughout the draft.

If a club chooses a player in stage 1 of the Re-Entry draft, that club must either exercise an option for that player or extend them a Bona Fide offer. Clubs may not select any player from their own club who are eligible to be part of the Re-Entry draft. If a player is selected in the Re-Entry draft, and they have a current option on their contract, they will be automatically added to the drafting club's roster. If a club makes a Bona Fide Offer, and the selected player rejects the offer, the drafting club maintains the Right to First Refusal for that player in Major League Soccer.

Any player not selected by a team in Stage 1 of the Re-Entry draft are available in Stage 2, unless the player requests to opt-out through a written that they submit to the league. If a club selects a player in Stage 2 they have seven days to make an offer to the player. If the club and player cannot reach an agreement, the club retains the Right to First Refusal in Major League Soccer. Just as with Stage 1, clubs may not select their own players in Stage 2.

== Stage One ==
Pick #	Drafting Team	Player	Position	Former Team
1	Austin FC (Note: No. 1: DC United → Austin FC. November 17, 2022: Austin FC acquired the #1 pick in Stage 1 of the 2022 MLS Re-Entry Draft from DC United in exchange for $50,000 in general allocation money and the 26th pick in Stage 1 of the 2022 MLS Re-Entry Draft)	Sofiane Djeffal	MF	DC United
2	Toronto FC	Tomas Romero	GK	Los Angeles FC
3	San Jose Earthquakes	PASS		
4	Houston Dynamo FC	PASS		
5	Chicago Fire FC	PASS		
6	Atlanta United FC	PASS		
7	Sporting Kansas City	PASS		
8	Seattle Sounders FC	PASS		
9	New England Revolution	PASS		
10	Charlotte FC	PASS		
11	Colorado Rapids	PASS		
12	Vancouver Whitecaps FC	Karifa Yao	DF	CF Montréal
13	Columbus Crew	PASS		
14	Portland Timbers	PASS		
15	Real Salt Lake	PASS		
16	Orlando City SC	PASS		
17	Inter Miami CF	PASS		
18	Minnesota United FC	PASS		
19	FC Cincinnati	PASS		
20	Nashville SC	PASS		
21	LA Galaxy	PASS		
22	FC Dallas	PASS		
23	New York Red Bulls	PASS		
24	New York City FC	PASS		
25	CF Montréal	PASS		
26	D.C. United	PASS		
27	Philadelphia Union	PASS		
28	Los Angeles FC	PASS		
29	St. Louis City SC	PASS		

== Stage Two ==
The second stage of the 2022 MLS Re-Entry Draft took place on Tuesday, November 22, 2022.

Pick #	Drafting Team	Player	Position	Former Team
1	New England Revolution (Note: No. 1: DC United → New England Revolution. November 22, 2022: New England Revolution acquired the #1 pick in Stage 2 of the 2022 MLS Re-Entry Draft from DC United in exchange for $50,000 in general allocation money and the 9th pick in Stage 2 of the 2022 MLS Re-Entry Draft)	Bobby Wood	FW	Real Salt Lake
2	Toronto FC	Víctor Vázquez	MF	Los Angeles Galaxy
3	San Jose Earthquakes	Michael Baldisimo	MF	Vancouver Whitecaps FC
4	Houston Dynamo FC	Ifunanyachi Achara	FW	Toronto FC
5	Chicago Fire FC	PASS		
6	Atlanta United FC	PASS		
7	Sporting Kansas City	PASS		
8	Seattle Sounders FC	PASS		
9	D.C. United	PASS		
10	Charlotte FC	PASS		
11	Colorado Rapids	PASS		
12	Vancouver Whitecaps FC	PASS		
13	Columbus Crew	PASS		
14	Portland Timbers	PASS		
15	Real Salt Lake	PASS		
16	Orlando City SC	PASS		
17	Inter Miami CF	PASS		
18	Minnesota United FC	PASS		
19	FC Cincinnati	PASS		
20	Nashville SC	PASS		
21	LA Galaxy	PASS		
22	FC Dallas	PASS		
23	New York Red Bulls	PASS		
24	New York City FC	PASS		
25	CF Montréal	PASS		
26	Austin FC	PASS		
27	Philadelphia Union	PASS		
28	Los Angeles FC	PASS		
29	St. Louis City SC	PASS		

After the Second Stage concluded, teams were allowed to select players who were on their own roster in 2022.

=== Round 2 ===
Pick #	Drafting Team	Player	Position	Former Team
30	Sporting Kansas City	Nicolas Isimat-Mirin	DF	Sporting Kansas City
31	Colorado Rapids	Lucas Esteves	DF	Colorado Rapids
