= 2023 MLS Re-Entry Draft =

College draft for soccer teams

General information
- Date(s): Stage 1: December 14, 2023; Stage 2: December 21, 2023

Overview
- League: Major League Soccer
- Teams: 29

The 2023 MLS Re-Entry Draft is conducted in two stages, as it has been in previous years. Stage 1 takes place on December 14, 2023, and Stage 2 takes place on December 21, 2023. All 29 existing Major League Soccer club will take part of the 2023 MLS Re-Entry Draft. The draft order was set in reverse order of the 2023 Major League Soccer season standing after completion of the 2023 MLS Cup Playoffs.

Players 22 year of age or older, with one year in the MLS, who do not have a current contract of Bona Fide Offer are eligible for the 2023 MLS Re-Entry Draft. Players may opt out of the draft by submitting a written notice to the league.

If a club chooses a player in stage 1 of the Re-Entry draft, that club must either exercise an option for that player or extend them a Bona Fide offer. Clubs may not select any player from their own club who are eligible to be part of the Re-Entry draft. If a player is selected in the Re-Entry draft, and they have a current option on their contract, they will be automatically added to the drafting club's roster. If a club makes a Bona Fide Offer, and the selected player rejects the offer, the drafting club maintains the Right to First Refusal for that player in Major League Soccer.

Any player not selected by a team in Stage 1 of the Re-Entry draft are available in Stage 2. If a club selects a player in Stage 2 they have seven days to make an offer to the player. If the club and player cannot reach an agreement, the club retains the Right to First Refusal in Major League Soccer. In Stage 2, clubs may not select their own players untio all other clubs decline to select player.

== Stage One ==
Pick #	Drafting Team	Player	Position	Former Team
1	Austin FC (Note: Toronto FC → Austin FC. Austin FC acquired the first pick in Stage 1 of the 2024 MLS Re-Entry Draft from Toronto FC in exchange for the 5th overall pick in the 2023 MLS Re-Entry Draft Stage 1 and the third round pick Austin FC had received from FC Cincinnati in the 2024 MLS SuperDraft.)	(Colombia) Jáder Obrian	FW	FC Dallas
2	Colorado Rapids	PASS		
3	Inter Miami CF	PASS		
4	LA Galaxy	PASS		
5	Toronto FC (Note: Austin FC → Toronto. Toronto acquired the 5th overall pick in the 2023 MLS Re-Entry Draft Stage 1 and the third round pick Austin FC had received from FC Cincinnati in the 2024 MLS SuperDraft from Austin FC in exchange for the first pick in Stage 1 of the 2024 MLS Re-Entry Draft from Toronto FC.)	PASS		
6	Chicago Fire FC	PASS		
7	D.C. United	PASS		
8	New York City FC	PASS		
9	Minnesota United FC	PASS		
10	CF Montréal	PASS		
11	Portland Timbers	PASS		
12	Charlotte FC	PASS		
13	San Jose Earthquakes	PASS		
14	New York Red Bulls	PASS		
15	FC Dallas	PASS		
16	Vancouver Whitecaps FC	PASS		
17	Nashville SC	PASS		
18	Real Salt Lake	PASS		
19	Atlanta United FC	PASS		
20	New England Revolution	PASS		
21	St. Louis City SC	PASS		
22	Sporting Kansas City	PASS		
23	Seattle Sounders FC	(Jamaica) Jonathan Bell	DF	St. Louis City SC
24	Philadelphia Union	PASS		
25	Orlando City SC	PASS		
26	Houston Dynamo FC	PASS		
27	FC Cincinnati	PASS		
28	Los Angeles FC	PASS		
29	Columbus Crew	PASS		

== Stage Two ==
Pick #	Drafting Team	Player	Position	Former Team
1	Atlanta United FC	(Republic of Ireland) Derrick Williams	CB	D.C. United
2	Colorado Rapids	PASS		
3	Inter Miami CF	PASS		
4	LA Galaxy	PASS		
5	Austin FC	PASS		
6	Chicago Fire FC	PASS		
7	D.C. United	PASS		
8	New York City FC	PASS		
9	Minnesota United FC	PASS		
10	CF Montréal	PASS		
11	Portland Timbers	PASS		
12	Charlotte FC	PASS		
13	San Jose Earthquakes	PASS		
14	New York Red Bulls	PASS		
15	FC Dallas	PASS		
16	Vancouver Whitecaps FC	PASS		
17	Nashville SC	PASS		
18	Real Salt Lake	PASS		
19	Toronto FC	PASS		
20	New England Revolution	PASS		
21	St. Louis City SC	PASS		
22	Sporting Kansas City	PASS		
23	Seattle Sounders FC	PASS		
24	Philadelphia Union	PASS		
25	Orlando City SC	PASS		
26	Houston Dynamo FC	PASS		
27	FC Cincinnati	PASS		
28	Los Angeles FC	PASS		
29	Columbus Crew	PASS		
