= 2015 MLS Re-Entry Draft =

College draft for soccer teams

General information
- Date(s): Stage 1: December 11, 2015; Stage 2: December 17, 2015

Overview
- League: Major League Soccer
- Teams: 20

The two-stage 2015 MLS Re-Entry Draft took place on December 11, 2015, (stage 1) and December 17, 2015, (stage 2). All 20 Major League Soccer clubs were eligible to participate. The priority order for the draft was reverse order of finish in 2015, taking into account play-off performance.

Available to all teams in stage 1 of the re-entry draft were:

- Players who were at least 23-years-old and had a minimum of three MLS service years whose options were not exercised by their clubs (available at option salary for 2016).
- Players who were at least 25-years-old with a minimum of four years of MLS experience who were out of contract and whose club did not wish to re-sign them at their previous salary (available for at least their 2015 salary).
- Free agents who chose to participate.

Players who were not selected in stage 1 were made available in stage 2. Clubs selecting players in stage 2 were able to negotiate a new salary with the player. Players who remained unselected after stage 2 were made available to any MLS club on a first-come, first-served basis.

Teams also had the option of passing on their selection.

== Available players ==
Players were required to meet age and service requirements to participate as stipulated by the terms of the MLS collective bargaining agreement. The league released a list of all players available for the re-entry draft on December 7, 2015.

Player	Position	Released by	Contract status	Re-entry draft result
Greg Cochrane	D	Chicago Fire	Option declined	Not selected
Jason Johnson	F	Chicago Fire	Option declined	Not selected
Alec Kann	G	Chicago Fire	Option declined	Selected by Sporting Kansas City in stage one
Lovel Palmer	D	Chicago Fire	Option declined	Not selected
Matt Watson	M	Chicago Fire	Out of contract	Not selected
Carlos Alvarez	M	Colorado Rapids	Option declined	Not selected
Vicente Sánchez	F	Colorado Rapids	Option declined	Not selected
Gabriel Torres	F	Colorado Rapids	Option declined	Not selected
Matt Lampson	G	Columbus Crew SC	Out of contract	Not selected
Jairo Arrieta	F	D.C. United	Option declined	Not selected
Michael Farfan	M	D.C. United	Option declined	Not selected
Michel	D	FC Dallas	Option declined	Not selected
Bakary Soumaré	D	FC Dallas	Option declined	Announced his retirement prior to draft
Boniek García	M	Houston Dynamo	Option declined	Re-signed with Houston prior to draft
Chandler Hoffman	F	Houston Dynamo	Option declined	Not selected
Alexander López	M	Houston Dynamo	Option declined	Not selected
Jermaine Taylor	D	Houston Dynamo	Option declined	Selected by Portland Timbers in Stage Two
Tommy Meyer	D	Los Angeles Galaxy	Out of contract	Not selected
Brian Perk	G	Los Angeles Galaxy	Option declined	Not selected
Donovan Ricketts	G	Los Angeles Galaxy	Out of contract	Not selected
Charlie Rugg	F	Los Angeles Galaxy	Option declined	Not selected
Hassoun Camara	D	Montreal Impact	Option declined	Re-signed with Montreal prior to draft
Kevin Alston	D	New England Revolution	Option declined	Selected by Orlando City SC in Stage Two
Andy Dorman	M	New England Revolution	Out of contract	Not selected
Jeremy Hall	M	New England Revolution	Option declined	Not selected
Jeb Brovsky	D	New York City FC	Option declined	Not selected
Kwame Watson-Siriboe	D	New York City FC	Option declined	Not selected
Roy Miller	D	New York Red Bulls	Option declined	Not selected
Dane Richards	M	New York Red Bulls	Option declined	Signed with Miami FC prior to draft
Anthony Wallace	D	New York Red Bulls	Option declined	Not selected
Tony Cascio	M	Orlando City SC	Out of contract	Not selected
Josh Ford	G	Orlando City SC	Option declined	Not selected
Tally Hall	G	Orlando City SC	Option declined	Not selected
Danny Mwanga	F	Orlando City SC	Option declined	Not selected
Lewis Neal	M	Orlando City SC	Option declined	Opted out of draft
Fred	M	Philadelphia Union	Option declined	Not selected
Warren Creavalle	M	Philadelphia Union	Option declined	Opted out of draft
Danny Cruz	M	Philadelphia Union	Option declined	Not selected
Antoine Hoppenot	F	Philadelphia Union	Out of contract	Not selected
Zac MacMath	G	Philadelphia Union	Option declined	Opted out of draft; subsequently traded to Colorado Rapids
Michael Nanchoff	M	Portland Timbers	Option declined	Not selected
Maximiliano Urruti	F	Portland Timbers	Option declined	Selected by FC Dallas in Stage One
Chris Schuler	D	Real Salt Lake	Out of contract	Not selected
Mike Fucito	F	San Jose Earthquakes	Out of contract	Not selected
Jordan Stewart	D	San Jose Earthquakes	Option declined	Not selected
Leonardo González	D	Seattle Sounders FC	Option declined	Not selected
Marco Pappa	M	Seattle Sounders FC	Option declined	Opted out of draft; subsequently traded to Colorado Rapids
Zach Scott	D	Seattle Sounders FC	Option declined	Opted out of draft
Jalil Anibaba	D	Sporting Kansas City	Option declined	Not selected
Seth Sinovic	D	Sporting Kansas City	Out of contract	Re-signed with Sporting Kansas City prior to draft
Joe Bendik	G	Toronto FC	Option declined	Not selected
Robbie Findley	F	Toronto FC	Out of contract	Not selected
Jackson	M	Toronto FC	Option declined	Not selected
Chris Konopka	G	Toronto FC	Option declined	Not selected
Steven Beitashour	D	Vancouver Whitecaps FC	Option declined	Opted out of draft
Pa Modou Kah	D	Vancouver Whitecaps FC	Option declined	Re-signed with Vancouver prior to draft
Mauro Rosales	M	Vancouver Whitecaps FC	Out of contract	Not selected
Paolo Tornaghi	G	Vancouver Whitecaps FC	Option declined	Not selected
Bright Dike	F		Option declined	Not selected
Tony Lochhead	D		Option declined	Not selected

== Stage One ==
The first stage of the 2015 MLS Re-Entry Draft took place on December 11, 2015.

=== Round 1 ===
Pick #	Drafting team	Player	Position	Former team
1	FC Dallas (Note: #1: Chicago Fire → FC Dallas. December 11, 2015: FC Dallas acquired the #1 selection in stage one of the 2015 re-entry draft from Chicago Fire in exchange for the #17 selection in stage one of the 2015 re-entry draft and general allocation money.)	Maximiliano Urruti	F	Portland Timbers
2	Colorado Rapids	Pass		
3	Philadelphia Union	Pass		
4	New York City FC	Pass		
5	Real Salt Lake	Pass		
6	Houston Dynamo	Pass		
7	Orlando City SC	Pass		
8	San Jose Earthquakes	Pass		
9	Toronto FC	Pass		
10	New England Revolution	Pass		
11	Sporting Kansas City	Alec Kann	G	Chicago Fire
12	Los Angeles Galaxy	Pass		
13	D.C. United	Pass		
14	Montreal Impact	Pass		
15	Seattle Sounders FC	Pass		
16	Vancouver Whitecaps FC	Pass		
17	Chicago Fire (Note: #17: FC Dallas → Chicago Fire. December 11, 2015: Chicago Fire acquired the #17 selection in stage one of the 2015 re-entry draft and general allocation money from FC Dallas in exchange for the #1 selection in stage one of the 2015 re-entry draft.)	Pass		
18	New York Red Bulls	Pass		
19	Columbus Crew SC	Pass		
20	Portland Timbers	Pass		

=== Round 2 ===
Pick #	Drafting team	Player	Position	Former team
21	FC Dallas	Pass		
22	Sporting Kansas City	Pass		

== Stage two ==
The second stage of the 2015 MLS re-entry draft took place on December 17, 2015.

=== Round 1 ===
Pick #	Drafting team	Player	Position	Former team
1	Chicago Fire	Pass		
2	Colorado Rapids	Pass		
3	Philadelphia Union	Pass		
4	New York City FC	Pass		
5	Real Salt Lake	Pass		
6	Houston Dynamo	Pass		
7	Orlando City SC	Kevin Alston	D	New England Revolution
8	San Jose Earthquakes	Pass		
9	Toronto FC	Pass		
10	New England Revolution	Pass		
11	Sporting Kansas City	Pass		
12	Los Angeles Galaxy	Pass		
13	D.C. United	Pass		
14	Montreal Impact	Pass		
15	Seattle Sounders FC	Pass		
16	Vancouver Whitecaps FC	Pass		
17	FC Dallas	Pass		
18	New York Red Bulls	Pass		
19	Columbus Crew SC	Pass		
20	Portland Timbers	Jermaine Taylor	D	Houston Dynamo

=== Round 2 ===
Pick #	Drafting team	Player	Position	Former team
21	Orlando City SC	Pass		
22	Portland Timbers	Pass		
