= MLS Re-Entry Draft =

Annual draft for veteran players in MLS

The MLS Re-Entry Draft is an annual event in which Major League Soccer teams select players who are out of contract or have had their options declined by their current teams. Although the single-entity league does not have true free agency, the re-entry draft was created to provide an outlet of internal movement for veteran players.

== History ==
The Re-Entry Draft was created by the collective bargaining agreement reached in March 2010. Under the previous rules, clubs could hold what amounted to a 48-hour first right of refusal on players whose contracts had expired or did not have the options picked up. This was a significant obstacle to a new agreement during negotiations during the 2009–10 MLS offseason. With the players threatening to strike, the league and owners agreed to add the suggested re-entry draft to provide some leverage to players.

The re-entry draft was praised by some for increasing freedom and flexibility of player movement, with agents and players arguing that it provided checks on teams who previously could either force a player to take a lower salary or make them seek options outside of MLS. Others, however, criticized the relative lack of players actually moving and the rushed nature of the process, which took place by conference call.

The first re-entry draft, consisting of two stages, took place over several weeks following the completion of the 2010 MLS season. Two players were chosen in Stage 1 of the draft with an additional eleven players chosen in the second stage, including World Cup veterans Jimmy Conrad, Josh Wolff, and Frankie Hejduk; designated player Juan Pablo Ángel, and Jeff Cunningham, then the second-leading scorer in league history.

== Process ==
Teams are able to select players who meet the following criteria:

- Players who are at least 23 years old and have a minimum of three years of MLS experience whose options were not exercised by their clubs (available at option salary for the next season).
- Players who are at least 25 years old with a minimum of four years of MLS experience who are out of contract and whose club does not offer them a contract at their previous salary (available at previous season's salary).
- Players who are at least 30 years old with a minimum of eight years of MLS experience who are out of contract and whose club does not wish to re-sign them (available for at least 105 percent of their previous season's salary).

Players with expiring contracts or options that are not renewed by their clubs who do not meet the age and service requirements necessary to be included in the Re-Entry Draft are instead available in the Waiver Draft.

The draft order is determined by a reverse combination of the teams' playoff and regular season positions, similar to the MLS SuperDraft, with any expansion clubs picking last.

Each club may either select a player from the eligible player list or pass. Once a club chooses to pass, they may no longer participate in that stage of the Re-Entry Process. Each stage continues until all clubs have passed on the available players.

=== Stage 1 ===
Clubs may not select their own players in Stage 1.

If a club selects a player in Stage 1, it must exercise the option for, or extend a Bona Fide Offer to, the player. If the player rejects the offer, the drafting club will hold the right of first refusal for that player in MLS. Players with option years left on their contract are automatically added to the drafting club’s roster. Any player selected in Stage 1 will remain on that years drafting club’s budget at the option price or Bona Fide Offer price until April 1 of the following year. Clubs and players may not mutually renegotiate that price to a lower number until April 1 of that year.

For several days after Stage 1, clubs may sign their own players or sign and trade a player to another club (provided the old club, new club, and player agree to the new terms). A blackout period then begins before Stage 2 takes place one week following Stage 1.

=== Stage 2 ===
In Stage 2, clubs may select from players that are under contract and those not under contract. If a player is not under contract, the drafting club will be required to make a genuine offer to the player within seven days. In the event that an agreement cannot be reached between the drafting club and an out-of-contract player, the drafting club will hold the right of first refusal for that player in MLS.

Clubs may select their own players in the Stage 2 draft only after all other clubs have declined to select those players.

If a player is not selected in either stage of the Re-Entry Process, that player will be available on a first-come, first-served basis to all clubs.

== List of Re-Entry Drafts ==
- 2010 MLS Re-Entry Draft
- 2011 MLS Re-Entry Draft
- 2012 MLS Re-Entry Draft
- 2013 MLS Re-Entry Draft
- 2014 MLS Re-Entry Draft
- 2015 MLS Re-Entry Draft
- 2016 MLS Re-Entry Draft
- 2017 MLS Re-Entry Draft
- 2018 MLS Re-Entry Draft
- 2019 MLS Re-Entry Draft
- 2020 MLS Re-Entry Draft
- 2021 MLS Re-Entry Draft
- 2022 MLS Re-Entry Draft
- 2023 MLS Re-Entry Draft
- 2024 MLS Re-Entry Draft
