= 2020 MLS Re-Entry Draft =

College draft for soccer teams

General information
- Dates: Stage 1: December 17, 2020; Stage 2: December 22, 2020

Overview
- League: Major League Soccer
- Teams: 27

The 2020 MLS Re-Entry Draft took place on December 17, 2020 (Stage 1) and December 22, 2020 (Stage 2). All 27 Major League Soccer clubs were eligible to participate. The priority order for the MLS Re-Entry Draft was reverse order of playoff finish in 2020, taking into account their regular season finish. The 2021 expansion team, Austin FC, received the last overall selection.

Available to all teams in Stage 1 of the Re-Entry draft were:

- Clubs must exercise the option for, or extend a Bona Fide Offer to, all players selected in Stage One and may not select their own draft-eligible players. Players with option years left on their contract will automatically be added to the drafting club's roster.
- Should a player reject the Bona Fide Offer, the drafting club will hold the Right of First Refusal for that player in MLS.

Players who were not selected in Stage 1 of the Re-Entry Draft were made available in Stage 2. Clubs selecting players in Stage 2 were able to negotiate a new salary with the player. If a selected player was not under contract, the selecting club was required to make a genuine offer to the player within seven days subject to League Office approval.

Players who were unselected after Stage 2 were made available to any MLS club on a first-come, first-served basis.

Teams also had the option of passing on their selection.

== Stage One ==
The first stage of the 2020 MLS Re-Entry Draft took place on December 17, 2020.Teams select in the reverse order of their finish during the 2020 season, taking into account playoff performance. Three players were selected in the first stage.

=== Round 1 ===
Pick #	Drafting Team	Player	Position	Former Team
1	Atlanta United FC (Note: #1: FC Cincinnati → Atlanta United. December 17, 2019: Atlanta United FC acquired the #1 selection in Stage One of the 2020 Re-Entry Draft from FC Cincinnati in exchange for the #4 selection in Stage One of the 2019 Re-Entry Draft and $75,000 in general allocation money)	Andrew Gutman	D	FC Cincinnati
2	Houston Dynamo	PASS		
3	D.C. United	PASS		
4	FC Cincinnati (Note: #1: Atlanta United → FC Cincinnati. December 17, 2019: FC Cincinnati acquired the #4 selection in Stage One of the 2020 Re-Entry Draft and $75,000 in general allocation money from Atlanta United FC in exchange for the #1 selection in Stage One of the 2019 Re-Entry Draft)	PASS		
5	Chicago Fire	PASS		
6	Real Salt Lake	PASS		
7	LA Galaxy	PASS		
8	Vancouver Whitecaps FC	PASS		
9	Inter Miami CF	PASS		
10	Montreal Impact	PASS		
11	San Jose Earthquakes	PASS		
12	New York Red Bulls	PASS		
13	Los Angeles FC	Raheem Edwards	D/MF	Minnesota United FC
14	Colorado Rapids	PASS		
15	Portland Timbers	PASS		
16	New York City FC	PASS		
17	Toronto FC	PASS		
18	Philadelphia Union	PASS		
19	Nashville SC	PASS		
20	FC Dallas	PASS		
21	Orlando City SC	PASS		
22	Sporting Kansas City	Kendall McIntosh	GK	New York Red Bulls
23	New England Revolution	PASS		
24	Minnesota United FC	PASS		
25	Seattle Sounders FC	PASS		
26	Columbus Crew	PASS		
27	Austin FC	PASS		

=== Round 2 ===
Pick #	Drafting Team	Player	Position	Former Team
28	Atlanta United FC	PASS		
29	Los Angeles FC	PASS		
30	Sporting Kansas City	PASS		

== Stage Two ==
The second stage of the 2020 MLS Re-Entry Draft took place on Tuesday, December 22, 2020.

=== Round 1 ===
Pick #	Drafting Team	Player	Position	Former Team
1	FC Cincinnati	PASS		
2	Houston Dynamo	Joe Corona	MF	Austin FC
3	D.C. United	Adrien Perez	FW	Los Angeles FC
4	Atlanta United FC	PASS		
5	Chicago Fire	PASS		
6	Real Salt Lake	PASS		
7	LA Galaxy	PASS		
8	Vancouver Whitecaps FC	PASS		
9	Inter Miami CF	PASS		
10	Montreal Impact	PASS		
11	San Jose Earthquakes	PASS		
12	New York Red Bulls	PASS		
13	Los Angeles FC	PASS		
14	Colorado Rapids	PASS		
15	Portland Timbers	PASS		
16	New York City FC	PASS		
17	Toronto FC	PASS		
18	Philadelphia Union	PASS		
19	Nashville SC	PASS		
20	FC Dallas	PASS		
21	Orlando City SC	PASS		
22	Sporting Kansas City	PASS		
23	New England Revolution	PASS		
24	Minnesota United FC	PASS		
25	Seattle Sounders FC	PASS		
26	Columbus Crew	Eric Dick	GK	Sporting Kansas City
27	Austin FC	PASS		

=== Round 2 ===
Pick #	Drafting Team	Player	Position	Former Team
28	Houston Dynamo	PASS		
29	D.C. United	PASS		
30	Columbus Crew	PASS		

After the Second Stage concluded, teams were allowed to select players who were on their own roster in 2020.

=== Round 3 ===
Pick #	Drafting Team	Player	Position	Former Team
31	Minnesota United FC	Luis Amarilla	FW	Minnesota United FC
32	Sporting Kansas City	Felipe Gutierrez	MF	Sporting Kansas City
