= 2017 MLS Re-Entry Draft =

College draft for soccer teams

General information
- Dates: Stage 1: December 15, 2017; Stage 2: December 21, 2017

Overview
- League: Major League Soccer
- Teams: 23

The 2017 MLS Re-Entry Draft took place on December 15, 2017 (Stage 1) and December 21, 2017 (Stage 2). All 23 Major League Soccer clubs were eligible to participate. The priority order for the MLS Re-Entry Draft was reverse order of finish in 2017, taking into account playoff performance. The 2018 expansion team, Los Angeles FC, had selection 23.

Available to all teams in Stage 1 of the Re-Entry draft were:

- Players not eligible for free agency who were at least 23 years old in 2017 with a minimum of three years of MLS experience.
- Players not eligible for free agency who did not receive a bona fide offer and who were at least 25 years old with a minimum of four years of MLS experience, or were at least 30 years old with a minimum of eight years of MLS experience.

Players who were not selected in Stage 1 of the Re-Entry Draft were made available in Stage 2. Clubs selecting players in Stage 2 were able to negotiate a new salary with the player. Players who remained unselected after Stage 2 were made available to any MLS club on a first-come, first-served basis.

Teams also had the option of passing on their selection.

== Available players ==
Players were required to meet age and service requirements to participate as stipulated by the terms of the MLS Collective Bargaining Agreement. The league released a list of all players available for the Re-Entry Draft on December 14, 2017.

Player	Position	Released By	Re-Entry Draft Result
Carlos Alvarez		Los Angeles FC	Not selected
Jalil Anibaba		Houston Dynamo	Not selected
Bernardo Añor		Minnesota United FC	Not selected
Giles Barnes		Orlando City SC	Not selected
Leandro Barrera		San Jose Earthquakes	Not selected
Hernán Bernardello		Montreal Impact	Not selected
Víctor Bernárdez		San Jose Earthquakes	Not selected
John Berner		Colorado Rapids	Not selected
Mark Bloom		Atlanta United FC	Not selected
Deshorn Brown		D.C. United	Not selected
Servando Carrasco		Orlando City SC	Selected by LA Galaxy in Stage Two
Cordell Cato		San Jose Earthquakes	Not selected
Charlie Davies		Philadelphia Union	Not selected
Patrick Doody		Chicago Fire	Not selected
Kevin Doyle		Colorado Rapids	Not selected
Maurice Edu		Philadelphia Union	Not selected
Maynor Figueroa		FC Dallas	Not selected
Rafael Garcia		LA Galaxy	Not selected
Joe Greenspan		Minnesota United FC	Not selected
Mike Grella		New York Red Bulls	Selected by Colorado Rapids in Stage One
Seb Hines		Orlando City SC	Not selected
Jermaine Jones		LA Galaxy	Not selected
Daigo Kobayashi		New England Revolution	Not selected
Chris Korb		D.C. United	Not selected
Matías Laba		Vancouver Whitecaps FC	Not selected
Mikey Lopez		New York City FC	Not selected
Calum Mallace		Seattle Sounders FC	Selected by Los Angeles FC in Stage Two
Jack McBean		LA Galaxy	Not selected
Jack McInerney		LA Galaxy	Not selected
Ben McKendry		Vancouver Whitecaps FC	Not selected
Patrick McLain		Minnesota United FC	Not selected
Tyrone Mears		Atlanta United FC	Selected by Minnesota United FC in Stage One
Jefferson Mena		New York City FC	Not selected
Raúl Mendiola		LA Galaxy	Not selected
Soni Mustivar		Sporting Kansas City	Not selected
Sean Okoli		New York City FC	Not selected
Amobi Okugo		Portland Timbers	Not selected
David Ousted		Vancouver Whitecaps FC	Opted out of draft
Marc Pelosi		San Jose Earthquakes	Not selected
Damien Perrinelle		New York Red Bulls	Not selected
Dillon Powers		Orlando City SC	Opted out of draft
Andrés Romero		Montreal Impact	Not selected
Mauro Rosales		Vancouver Whitecaps FC	Not selected
Mohammed Saeid		Colorado Rapids	Not selected
Lloyd Sam		D.C. United	Not selected
Richard Sánchez		Chicago Fire	Opted out of draft
Vicente Sánchez		Houston Dynamo	Not selected
Kofi Sarkodie		San Jose Earthquakes	Not selected
Marcelo Sarvas		D.C. United	Not selected
Gastón Sauro		Columbus Crew SC	Opted out of draft
Donnie Smith		New England Revolution	Not selected
John Stertzer		New York City FC	Not selected
Jermaine Taylor		Minnesota United FC	Not selected
Gonzalo Verón		New York Red Bulls	Selected by D.C. United in Stage Two
Jose Villarreal		LA Galaxy	Not selected
Je-Vaughn Watson		New England Revolution	Not selected
Ethan White		New York City FC	Not selected
Sheanon Williams		Vancouver Whitecaps FC	Not selected
London Woodberry		New England Revolution	Not selected

== Stage One ==
The first stage of the 2017 MLS Re-Entry Draft took place on December 15, 2017.

=== Round 1 ===
Pick #	Drafting Team	Player	Position	Former Team
1	LA Galaxy	Pass		
2	D.C. United	Pass		
3	Colorado Rapids	Mike Grella	M	New York Red Bulls
4	Minnesota United FC	Tyrone Mears	D	Atlanta United FC
5	Orlando City SC	Pass		
6	Montreal Impact	Pass		
7	Philadelphia Union	Pass		
8	New England Revolution	Pass		
9	Real Salt Lake	Pass		
10	FC Dallas	Pass		
11	San Jose Earthquakes	Pass		
12	Sporting Kansas City	Pass		
13	Atlanta United FC	Pass		
14	Chicago Fire	Pass		
15	New York Red Bulls	Pass		
16	Vancouver Whitecaps FC	Pass		
17	Portland Timbers	Pass		
18	New York City FC	Pass		
19	Houston Dynamo	Pass		
20	Columbus Crew SC	Pass		
21	Seattle Sounders FC	Pass		
22	Toronto FC	Pass		
23	Los Angeles FC	Pass		

=== Round 2 ===
Pick #	Drafting Team	Player	Position	Former Team
23	Colorado Rapids	Pass		
24	Minnesota United FC	Pass		

== Stage Two ==
The second stage of the 2017 MLS Re-Entry Draft took place on December 21, 2017.

=== Round 1 ===
Pick #	Drafting Team	Player	Position	Former Team
1	LA Galaxy	Servando Carrasco	M	Orlando City SC
2	D.C. United	Gonzalo Verón	M	New York Red Bulls
3	Colorado Rapids	Pass		
4	Minnesota United FC	Pass		
5	Orlando City SC	Pass		
6	Montreal Impact	Pass		
7	Philadelphia Union	Pass		
8	New England Revolution	Pass		
9	Real Salt Lake	Pass		
10	FC Dallas	Pass		
11	San Jose Earthquakes	Pass		
12	Sporting Kansas City	Pass		
13	Atlanta United FC	Pass		
14	Chicago Fire	Pass		
15	New York Red Bulls	Pass		
16	Vancouver Whitecaps FC	Pass		
17	Portland Timbers	Pass		
18	New York City FC	Pass		
19	Houston Dynamo	Pass		
20	Columbus Crew SC	Pass		
21	Seattle Sounders FC	Pass		
22	Toronto FC	Pass		
23	Los Angeles FC	Calum Mallace	M	Seattle Sounders FC

=== Round 2 ===
Pick #	Drafting Team	Player	Position	Former Team
23	LA Galaxy	Pass		
24	D.C. United	Pass		
25	Los Angeles FC	Pass		
