= 2019 MLS Re-Entry Draft =

College draft for soccer teams

General information
- Date(s): Stage 1: November 26, 2019; Stage 2: December 3, 2019

Overview
- League: Major League Soccer
- Teams: 26

The 2019 MLS Re-Entry Draft took place on November 26, 2019 (Stage 1) and December 3, 2019 (Stage 2). All 26 Major League Soccer clubs were eligible to participate. The priority order for the MLS Re-Entry Draft was reverse order of finish in 2019, taking into account playoff performance. The 2020 expansion teams, Nashville SC and Inter Miami CF, received selections #25 and #26, respectively.

Available to all teams in Stage 1 of the Re-Entry draft were:

- Players who were at least 23 years old and had a minimum of three years of MLS experience whose contract options were not exercised by their clubs. They were available at their option salary for 2020.
- Players who were at least 25 years old with a minimum of four years of MLS experience who are out of contract and whose club did not wish to re-sign them at their previous salary. They were available for at least their 2019 salary.
- Free Agents that chose to participate.

Players who were not selected in Stage 1 of the Re-Entry Draft were made available in Stage 2. Clubs selecting players in Stage 2 were able to negotiate a new salary with the player. If a selected player was not under contract, the selecting club was required to make a genuine offer to the player within seven days subject to League Office approval.

Players who were unselected after Stage 2 were made available to any MLS club on a first-come, first-served basis.

Teams also had the option of passing on their selection.

== Available players ==
Players were required to meet age and service requirements to participate as stipulated by the terms of the MLS Collective Bargaining Agreement. The league released a list of all players available for the Re-Entry Draft on November 22, 2019. Subsequently, the league released a list of all players available for Stage Two of the Re-Entry Draft on December 2, 2019.

Player	Released By	Re-Entry Draft Result
Mikey Ambrose	Atlanta United FC	Selected by Inter Miami CF in Stage One
Stefan Cleveland	Chicago Fire FC	Traded to Seattle Sounders FC prior to Stage One
David Ousted	Chicago Fire FC	Not Selected
Richard Sánchez	Chicago Fire FC	Selected by Sporting Kansas City in Stage One
Kofi Opare	Colorado Rapids	Not Selected
Dillon Serna	Colorado Rapids	Not Selected
Alex Crognale	Columbus Crew SC	Not Selected
David Guzmán	Columbus Crew SC	Not Selected
Jordan Hamilton	Columbus Crew SC	Withdrew prior to Stage Two
Connor Maloney	Columbus Crew SC	Not Selected
Romario Williams	Columbus Crew SC	Not Selected
Earl Edwards Jr.	D.C. United	Withdrew prior to Stage Two
Jalen Robinson	D.C. United	Not Selected
Corben Bone	FC Cincinnati	Not Selected
Roland Lamah	FC Cincinnati	Not Selected
Jimmy McLaughlin	FC Cincinnati	Not Selected
Blake Smith	FC Cincinnati	Not Selected
Cristian Colmán	FC Dallas	Not Selected
Moisés Hernández	FC Dallas	Not Selected
Eric Bird	Houston Dynamo	Not Selected
Juan David Cabezas	Houston Dynamo	Not Selected
Darwin Cerén	Houston Dynamo	Withdrew prior to Stage Two
Dejan Jakovic	Los Angeles FC	Withdrew prior to Stage Two
Joao Pedro	LA Galaxy	Not Selected
Miguel Ibarra	Minnesota United FC	Not Selected
Collin Martin	Minnesota United FC	Not Selected
Rasmus Schüller	Minnesota United FC	Not Selected
Anthony Jackson-Hamel	Montreal Impact	Withdrew prior to Stage Two
Charlie Lyon	none	Not Selected
Yura Movsisyan	none	Not Selected
Juan Agudelo	New England Revolution	Selected by Toronto FC in Stage Two
Cody Cropper	New England Revolution	Not Selected
Brian Wright	New England Revolution	Not Selected
Vincent Bezecourt	New York Red Bulls	Not Selected
Marcus Epps	New York Red Bulls	Not Selected
Derrick Etienne	New York Red Bulls	Not Selected
Evan Louro	New York Red Bulls	Not Selected
Bradley Wright-Phillips	New York Red Bulls	Withdrew prior to Stage Two
Eric Miller	New York City FC	Selected by Nashville SC in Stage One
Cristian Higuita	Orlando City SC	Not Selected
Shane O'Neill	Orlando City SC	Not Selected
Dillon Powers	Orlando City SC	Not Selected
Oriol Rosell	Orlando City SC	Withdrew prior to Stage Two
R. J. Allen	Philadelphia Union	Not Selected
Fabinho	Philadelphia Union	Not Selected
Kendall McIntosh	Portland Timbers	Selected by New York Red Bulls in Stage One
Diego Valeri	Portland Timbers	Withdrew prior to Stage Two
Jordan Allen	Real Salt Lake	Not Selected
Alex Horwath	Real Salt Lake	Not Selected
Luke Mulholland	Real Salt Lake	Not Selected
Joao Plata	Real Salt Lake	Not Selected
Marcelo Silva	Real Salt Lake	
François Affolter	San Jose Earthquakes	Not Selected
Jimmy Ockford	San Jose Earthquakes	Not Selected
Saad Abdul-Salaam	Seattle Sounders FC	Selected by FC Cincinnati in Stage Two
Jonathan Campbell	Seattle Sounders FC	Not Selected
Victor Rodriguez	Seattle Sounders FC	Not Selected
Luis Silva	Seattle Sounders FC	Not Selected
Román Torres	Seattle Sounders FC	Not Selected
Krisztián Németh	Sporting Kansas City	Not Selected
Caleb Patterson-Sewell	Toronto FC	Not Selected
PC	Vancouver Whitecaps FC	Not Selected
Brett Levis	Vancouver Whitecaps FC	Not Selected
Scott Sutter	Vancouver Whitecaps FC	Not Selected

== Stage One ==
The first stage of the 2019 MLS Re-Entry Draft took place on November 26, 2019.

=== Round 1 ===
Pick #	Drafting Team	Player	Position	Former Team
1	Inter Miami CF (Note: #1: FC Cincinnati → Inter Miami. November 11, 2019: Inter Miami FC acquired the #1 selection in Stage One of the 2019 Re-Entry Draft and midfielder Víctor Ulloa from FC Cincinnati in exchange for the #26 selection in Stage One of the 2019 Re-Entry Draft, $50,000 in general allocation money, and a third-round selection in the 2020 MLS SuperDraft.)	Mikey Ambrose	D	Atlanta United FC
2	Nashville SC (Note: #2: Vancouver Whitecaps FC → Nashville SC. November 26, 2019: Nashville SC acquired the #2 selection in Stage One of the 2019 Re-Entry Draft from Vancouver Whitecaps FC in exchange for the #25 selection in Stage One of the 2019 Re-Entry Draft and a second-round selection in the 2022 MLS SuperDraft.)	Eric Miller	D	New York City FC
3	Orlando City SC	Pass		
4	Sporting Kansas City	Richard Sánchez	GK	Chicago Fire FC
5	Columbus Crew SC	Pass		
6	Houston Dynamo	Pass		
7	Montreal Impact	Pass		
8	Chicago Fire	Pass		
9	Colorado Rapids	Pass		
10	San Jose Earthquakes	Pass		
11	New England Revolution	Pass		
12	FC Dallas	Pass		
13	New York Red Bulls	Kendall McIntosh	GK	Portland Timbers
14	Portland Timbers	Pass		
15	D.C. United	Pass		
16	Minnesota United FC	Pass		
17	LA Galaxy	Pass		
18	Real Salt Lake	Pass		
19	Philadelphia Union	Pass		
20	New York City FC	Pass		
21	Atlanta United FC	Pass		
22	Los Angeles FC	Pass		
23	Toronto FC	Pass		
24	Seattle Sounders FC	Pass		
25	Vancouver Whitecaps FC (Note: #25: Nashville SC → Vancouver Whitecaps FC. November 26, 2019: Vancouver Whitecaps FC acquired the #25 selection in Stage One of the 2019 Re-Entry Draft and a second-round selection in the 2022 MLS SuperDraft from Nashville SC in exchange for the #2 selection in Stage One of the 2019 Re-Entry Draft.)	Pass		
26	FC Cincinnati (Note: #26: Inter Miami → FC Cincinnati. November 11, 2019: FC Cincinnati acquired the #26 selection in Stage One of the 2019 Re-Entry Draft, $50,000 in general allocation money, and a third-round selection in the 2020 MLS SuperDraft from Inter Miami CF in exchange for the #1 selection in Stage One of the 2019 Re-Entry Draft and midfielder Víctor Ulloa.)	Pass		

=== Round 2 ===
Pick #	Drafting Team	Player	Position	Former Team
27	Inter Miami CF	Pass		
28	Nashville SC	Pass		
29	Sporting Kansas City	Pass		
30	New York Red Bulls	Pass		

== Stage Two ==
The second stage of the 2019 MLS Re-Entry Draft took place on December 3, 2019.

=== Round 1 ===
Pick #	Drafting Team	Player	Position	Former Team
1	FC Cincinnati	Saad Abdul-Salaam	D	Seattle Sounders FC
2	Vancouver Whitecaps FC	Pass		
3	Orlando City SC	Pass		
4	Sporting Kansas City	Pass		
5	Columbus Crew SC	Pass		
6	Houston Dynamo	Pass		
7	Montreal Impact	Pass		
8	Chicago Fire	Pass		
9	Colorado Rapids	Pass		
10	San Jose Earthquakes	Pass		
11	New England Revolution	Pass		
12	FC Dallas	Pass		
13	New York Red Bulls	Pass		
14	Portland Timbers	Pass		
15	D.C. United	Pass		
16	Minnesota United FC	Pass		
17	LA Galaxy	Pass		
18	Real Salt Lake	Pass		
19	Philadelphia Union	Pass		
20	New York City FC	Pass		
21	Atlanta United FC	Pass		
22	Los Angeles FC	Pass		
23	Toronto FC	Juan Agudelo	F	New England Revolution
24	Seattle Sounders FC	Pass		
25	Nashville SC	Pass		
26	Inter Miami CF	Pass		

=== Round 2 ===
Pick #	Drafting Team	Player	Position	Former Team
27	FC Cincinnati	Pass		
28	Toronto FC	Pass		
