= 2024 MLS Re-Entry Draft =

College draft for soccer teams

General information
- Date(s): Stage 1: December 13, 2024; Stage 2: December 19, 2024

Overview
- League: Major League Soccer
- Teams: 30

The 2024 MLS Re-Entry Draft was conducted in two stages, as it has been in previous years. Stage 1 took place on December 13, 2024, and Stage 2 took place on December 19, 2024. All 30 existing Major League Soccer club took part of the 2024 MLS Re-Entry Draft. The draft order was set in reverse order of the 2024 Major League Soccer season standing after completion of the 2024 MLS Cup Playoffs.

== Rules ==
Players 22 years of age or older, with one year in the MLS, who do not have a current contract or Bona Fide Offer are eligible for the 2024 MLS Re-Entry Draft. Players may opt out of the draft by submitting a written notice to the league. If a player opts out the club will maintain Right to First Refusal and must have players consent to trade the player.

If a club chooses a player in stage 1 of the Re-Entry draft, that club must either exercise an option for that player or extend them a Bona Fide offer. Clubs may not select any player from their own club who are eligible to be part of the Re-Entry draft. If a player is selected in the Re-Entry draft, and they have a current option on their contract, they will be automatically added to the drafting club's roster. If a club makes a Bona Fide Offer, and the selected player rejects the offer, the drafting club maintains the Right to First Refusal for that player in Major League Soccer.

Any player not selected by a team in Stage 1 of the Re-Entry draft are available in Stage 2. If a club selects a player in Stage 2 they have seven days to make an offer to the player. If the club and player cannot reach an agreement, the club retains the Right to First Refusal in Major League Soccer. In Stage 2, clubs may not select their own players until all other clubs decline to select player.

== Stage One ==
| Pick # | Drafting Team | Player | Position | Former Team |
|---|---|---|---|---|
| 1 | San Jose Earthquakes | PASS | | |
| 2 | Chicago Fire FC | PASS | | |
| 3 | Sporting Kansas City | PASS | | |
| 4 | New England Revolution | PASS | | |
| 5 | Nashville SC | PASS | | |
| 6 | St. Louis City SC | PASS | | |
| 7 | Philadelphia Union | PASS | | |
| 8 | Toronto FC | PASS | | |
| 9 | D.C. United | PASS | | |
| 10 | FC Dallas | PASS | | |
| 11 | Austin FC | PASS | | |
| 12 | CF Montréal | PASS | | |
| 13 | Portland Timbers | PASS | | |
| 14 | Vancouver Whitecaps | PASS | | |
| 15 | Colorado Rapids | PASS | | |
| 16 | Charlotte FC | PASS | | |
| 17 | Houston Dynamo | PASS | | |
| 18 | Real Salt Lake | (Ghana) Forster Ajago | FW | Nashville SC |
| 19 | FC Cincinnati | PASS | | |
| 20 | Columbus Crew | PASS | | |
| 21 | Inter Miami CF | PASS | | |
| 22 | Atlanta United | PASS | | |
| 23 | New York City FC | PASS | | |
| 24 | Minnesota United | (United States) Kipp Keller | DF | FC Cincinnati |
| 25 | Los Angeles FC | PASS | | |
| 26 | Orlando City SC | PASS | | |
| 27 | Seattle Sounders FC | PASS | | |
| 28 | New York Red Bulls | PASS | | |
| 29 | LA Galaxy | PASS | | |
| 30 | San Diego FC | (United States) Jacob Jackson | GK | San Jose Earthquakes |

== Stage Two ==
=== Round 1 ===
| Pick # | Drafting Team | Player | Position | Former Team |
|---|---|---|---|---|
| 1 | San Jose Earthquakes | PASS | | |
| 2 | Chicago Fire FC | PASS | | |
| 3 | Sporting Kansas City | PASS | | |
| 4 | New England Revolution | PASS | | |
| 5 | Nashville SC | PASS | | |
| 6 | St. Louis City SC | PASS | | |
| 7 | Philadelphia Union | PASS | | |
| 8 | Toronto FC | PASS | | |
| 9 | D.C. United | (United States) Derek Dodson | | |
| 10 | FC Dallas | PASS | | |
| 11 | Austin FC | PASS | | |
| 12 | CF Montréal | PASS | | |
| 13 | Portland Timbers | PASS | | |
| 14 | Vancouver Whitecaps | PASS | | |
| 15 | Colorado Rapids | PASS | | |
| 16 | Charlotte FC | PASS | | |
| 17 | Houston Dynamo | PASS | | |
| 18 | Real Salt Lake | PASS | | |
| 19 | FC Cincinnati | PASS | | |
| 20 | Columbus Crew | PASS | | |
| 21 | Inter Miami CF | PASS | | |
| 22 | Atlanta United | PASS | | |
| 23 | New York City FC | PASS | | |
| 24 | Minnesota United | PASS | | |
| 25 | Los Angeles FC | PASS | | |
| 26 | Orlando City SC | PASS | | |
| 27 | Seattle Sounders FC | PASS | | |
| 28 | New York Red Bulls | PASS | | |
| 29 | LA Galaxy | PASS | | |
| 30 | San Diego FC | (Ghana) Yaw Yeboah | | |

=== Round 2 ===
| Pick # | Drafting Team | Player | Position | Former Team |
|---|---|---|---|---|
| 31 | D.C. United | PASS | | |
| 32 | San Diego FC | (Argentina) Franco Negri | | |
