= 2021 MLS Re-Entry Draft =

College draft for soccer teams

General information
- Date(s): Stage 1: December 17, 2021; Stage 2: December 23, 2021

Overview
- League: Major League Soccer
- Teams: 28

The 2021 MLS Re-Entry Draft took place on December 17, 2021 (Stage 1) and December 23, 2021 (Stage 2). All 28 Major League Soccer clubs were eligible to participate. The priority order for the MLS Re-Entry Draft was reverse order of playoff finish in 2021, taking into account their regular season finish. The 2022 expansion team, Charlotte FC, received the last overall selection. Teams had the option of passing on their selection.

For players selected in Stage 1 of the Re-Entry draft, clubs had to exercise the option for, or extend a Bona Fide Offer to, all players selected and may not select their own draft-eligible players. Players with option years left on their contract were automatically added to the drafting club's roster. Additionally, should a player have rejected the Bona Fide Offer, the drafting club would hold the Right of First Refusal for that player in MLS. Only one player was selected in Stage 1, with Nashville SC selecting Josh Bauer from Atlanta United FC.

Players who were not selected in Stage 1 of the Re-Entry Draft were made available in Stage 2. Clubs selecting players in Stage 2 were able to negotiate a new salary with the player. If a selected player was not under contract, the selecting club was required to make a genuine offer to the player within seven days subject to League Office approval. Players who were unselected after Stage 2 were made available to any MLS club on a first-come, first-served basis.

== Stage One ==
=== Round 1 ===
Pick #	Drafting Team	Player	Position	Former Team
1	FC Cincinnati	PASS		
2	Toronto FC	PASS		
3	Houston Dynamo FC	PASS		
4	Austin FC	PASS		
5	FC Dallas	PASS		
6	Chicago Fire FC	PASS		
7	San Jose Earthquakes	PASS		
8	Inter Miami CF	PASS		
9	Los Angeles FC	PASS		
10	CF Montréal	PASS		
11	Columbus Crew	PASS		
12	D.C. United	PASS		
13	LA Galaxy	PASS		
14	New York Red Bulls	PASS		
15	Vancouver Whitecaps FC	PASS		
16	Minnesota United FC	PASS		
17	Orlando City SC	PASS		
18	Atlanta United FC	PASS		
19	Seattle Sounders FC	PASS		
20	Nashville SC	Josh Bauer	DF	Atlanta United FC
21	Sporting Kansas City	PASS		
22	Colorado Rapids	PASS		
23	New England Revolution	PASS		
24	Real Salt Lake	PASS		
25	Philadelphia Union	PASS		
26	Portland Timbers	PASS		
27	New York City FC	PASS		
28	Charlotte FC	PASS		

== Stage Two ==
The second stage of the 2021 MLS Re-Entry Draft took place on Thursday, December 23, 2021.

=== Round 1 ===
Pick #	Drafting Team	Player	Position	Former Team
1	FC Cincinnati	John Nelson	LB	FC Dallas
2	Colorado Rapids (Note: No. 2: Toronto FC → Colorado Rapids. December 23, 2021: Colorado Rapids acquired the #2 pick in Stage Two of the 2021 MLS Re-Entry Draft from Toronto FC and the #2 pick in the Waiver Order in exchange for $75,000 in general allocation money and the 22nd pick in Stage Two of the 2021 MLS Re-Entry Draft.)	Bryan Acosta	MF	FC Dallas
3	Houston Dynamo FC	PASS		
4	Columbus Crew (Note: No. 4: Austin FC → Columbus Crew. December 23, 2021: Columbus Crew acquired the #4 pick in Stage Two of the 2021 MLS Re-Entry Draft from Austin FC in exchange for $50,000 in general allocation money and the 11th pick in Stage Two of the 2021 MLS Re-Entry Draft and a 3rd Round Pick in the 2023 MLS SuperDraft.)	Brady Scott	GK	Austin FC
5	FC Dallas	PASS		
6	Chicago Fire FC	PASS		
7	San Jose Earthquakes	Ján Greguš	MF	Minnesota United FC
8	Inter Miami CF	PASS		
9	Los Angeles FC	PASS		
10	CF Montréal	PASS		
11	Austin FC (Note: No. 11: Columbus Crew → Austin FC. December 23, 2021: Columbus Crew acquired the #4 pick in Stage Two of the 2021 MLS Re-Entry Draft from Austin FC in exchange for $50,000 in general allocation money and the 11th pick in Stage Two of the 2021 MLS Re-Entry Draft and a 3rd Round Pick in the 2023 MLS SuperDraft.)	PASS		
12	D.C. United	PASS		
13	LA Galaxy	PASS		
14	New York Red Bulls	PASS		
15	Vancouver Whitecaps FC	PASS		
16	Minnesota United FC	Eric Dick	GK	Columbus Crew
17	Orlando City SC	PASS		
18	Atlanta United FC	PASS		
19	Seattle Sounders FC	PASS		
20	Nashville SC	PASS		
21	Sporting Kansas City	Robert Beric	FW	Chicago Fire FC
22	Toronto FC (Note: No. 22: Colorado Rapids → Toronto FC. December 23, 2021: Colorado Rapids acquired the #2 pick in Stage Two of the 2021 MLS Re-Entry Draft from Toronto FC and the #2 pick in the Waiver Order in exchange for $75,000 in general allocation money and the 22nd pick in Stage Two of the 2021 MLS Re-Entry Draft.)	PASS		
23	New England Revolution	PASS		
24	Real Salt Lake	PASS		
25	Philadelphia Union	PASS		
26	Portland Timbers	PASS		
27	New York City FC	PASS		
28	Charlotte FC	PASS		
