= 2020 D.C. United season =

D.C. United
2020 season
- General manager: Dave Kasper
- Head coach: Ben Olsen (until October 8); Chad Ashton (interim) (from October 8 till December 12)
- Stadium: Audi Field
- MLS: Conference: 13th Overall: 24th
- MLS Cup Playoffs: Did not qualify
- U.S. Open Cup: Canceled
- Leagues Cup: Canceled
- MLS is Back Tournament: Group stage
- Atlantic Cup: 2nd
- Top goalscorer: League: Yamil Asad (3); All: Ola Kamara (5)
- Highest home attendance: 17,183
- Lowest home attendance: 16,932 (Note: Excluding matches played behind closed doors due to the COVID-19 pandemic.)
- Average home league attendance: 17,056
- Biggest win: DCU 2–1 Miami (7 Mar 2020)
- Biggest defeat: Philadelphia 4–1 DCU (29 Aug 2020); NYCFC 4–1 DCU (7 Oct 2020)
Home colors	Away colors

The 2020 D.C. United season was the club's 25th season of existence, and their 25th consecutive season playing in Major League Soccer, the top flight of American soccer. The regular season began on February 29, 2020 (making it the first time the season began in February), and was suspended on March 12, 2020, due to the COVID-19 pandemic. The club's season is resumed on July 13, 2020, with the MLS is Back Tournament at the ESPN Wide World of Sports Complex near Orlando, Florida, where group stage fixtures counted towards the regular season standings. The season ended on November 8, 2020, with their final regular season match.

Due to the COVID-19 pandemic, United's slate of external competitions were greatly altered. The club was slated to participate in the 2020 U.S. Open Cup beginning in April, however that tournament was cancelled due to the pandemic. Additionally, United was slated to play in the 2020 Leagues Cup, a secondary knock-out tournament for the top MLS clubs which did not qualify for the 2020 CONCACAF Champions League. As with the Open Cup, the Leagues Cup was cancelled due to the pandemic.

The 2020 season has also brought changes to D.C. United's coaching staff. After a string of losses, which pushed United to last place in the Eastern Conference's standings, head coach Ben Olsen was replaced by assistant coach Chad Ashton on October 8, 2020.

== Preseason exhibitions ==
January 28	D.C. United	1–3	Montreal Impact	Tampa
11:30 EST	Fawole 86'	Report	Tabla 63', 84'; Quioto 78'	Stadium: Corbett Soccer Stadium

February 1	D.C. United	0–3	New York Red Bulls	Bradenton
11:30 EST		Report	Royer 11'; Valot 22'; Barlow 63'	Stadium: IMG Academy

February 6	Louisville City	0–1	D.C. United	Clearwater
16:00 EST	(yellow card) 57'	Report	Gamble 70'	Stadium: Joe DiMaggio Complex

February 15	Orlando City SC	0–1	D.C. United	Tampa
17:00 EST		Report; Report	Gamble 77'	Stadium: Corbett Soccer Stadium

February 19	Nashville SC	1–1	D.C. United	Clearwater
18:00 EST	Mukhtar 12' (pen.)	Report	Sorga 8'	Stadium: Joe DiMaggio Sports Complex

February 22	D.C. United	3–1	Philadelphia Union	Clearwater
19:00 EST	Kamara 18', 55' (pen.); Segura 59'	Report	Monteiro 44'	Stadium: Joe DiMaggio Sports Complex

== Competitive fixtures ==
=== Major League Soccer ===
==== Standings ====
===== Eastern Conference =====
Pos	Team	Pld	W	L	T	GF	GA	GD	Pts	PPG	Qualification
10	Inter Miami CF	23	7	13	3	25	35	−10	24	1.04	MLS Cup Play-in Round
11	Chicago Fire FC	23	5	10	8	33	39	−6	23	1.00	
12	Atlanta United FC	23	6	13	4	23	30	−7	22	0.96	
13	D.C. United	23	5	12	6	25	41	−16	21	0.91	
14	FC Cincinnati	23	4	15	4	12	36	−24	16	0.70	

Source: MLS
Rules for classification: 1) points per game; 2) total wins per match played; 3) total goal differential per match played; 4) total goals scored per match played; 5) fewest disciplinary points per match played; 6) away goal differential per away match played; 7) away goals scored per away match played; 8) home goal differential per home match played; 9) home goals scored per home match played; 10) coin toss or drawing of lots.

===== Overall =====
2020 MLS overall standings
Pos	Team	Pld	W	L	T	GF	GA	GD	Pts	PPG	Qualification
22	Chicago Fire FC	23	5	10	8	33	39	−6	23	1.00	
23	Atlanta United FC	23	6	13	4	23	30	−7	22	0.96	CONCACAF Champions League
24	D.C. United	23	5	12	6	25	41	−16	21	0.91	
25	Houston Dynamo	23	4	10	9	30	40	−10	21	0.91	
26	FC Cincinnati	23	4	15	4	12	36	−24	16	0.70	

Source: MLS
Rules for classification: 1) points per game; 2) total wins per match played; 3) total goal differential per match played; 4) total goals scored per match played; 5) fewest disciplinary points per match played; 6) away goal differential per away match played; 7) away goals scored per away match played; 8) home goal differential per home match played; 9) home goals scored per home match played; 10) coin toss or drawing of lots.

==== Results by round ====
Matchday	1	2	3	4	5	6	7	8	9	10	11	12	13	14	15	16	17	18	19	20	21	22	23
Stadium	H	H	N	N	N	A	H	A	A	H	H	H	A	H	H	A	A	H	A	A	H	A	H
Result	L	W	D	D	L	D	L	L	W	D	L	D	L	L	L	L	L	D	W	W	W	L	L
Position (conference)	9	6	7	7	10	10	10	11	10	10	10	11	13	13	14	14	14	14	14	13	12	12	13
Position (overall)	16	12	13	13	16	16	18	18	19	19	20	22	23	25	26	26	26	26	25	24	23	22	25

Updated to match(es) played on November 8, 2020. Source: MLS
A = Away; H = Home; N = Neutral; W = Win; D = Draw; L = Loss; P = Postponed

==== Results summary ====
February 29 1	D.C. United	1–2	Colorado Rapids	Washington, D.C.
13:00 EST	Canouse 60'; Moreno (yellow card) 64'; Mora (yellow card) 76'; Brillant (yellow card) 87'	Report	Shinyashiki (yellow card) 58'; Kamara 67'; Lewis 90+2'	Stadium: Audi Field; Attendance: 16,932; Referee: Nima Saghafi

March 7 2	D.C. United	2–1	Inter Miami CF	Washington, D.C.
15:30 EST	Moreno (yellow card) 38'; Asad 59' (pen.); Brillant 61'; Odoi-Atsem (yellow card) 88'; Canouse (yellow card) 90+4'	Report	Pizarro 2'; Torres (red card) 54'; Trapp (yellow card) 60'; Figal (yellow card) 84'	Stadium: Audi Field; Attendance: 17,183; Referee: Rubiel Vazquez

Season suspended due to the COVID-19 pandemic

July 13 3 (MiBT GS)	Toronto FC	2–2	D.C. United	Bay Lake, Florida
09:00 EST	Akinola 12', 44'	Report	Moreno (yellow card) 18' (yellow-red card) 45+6'; Felipe (yellow card) 71'; Canouse (yellow card) 82'; Higuaín 84'; Brillant 90+1'	Stadium: ESPN Wide World of Sports Complex; Attendance: 0 Referee: Fotis Bazakos
Note: Group stage match of the MLS is Back Tournament that counts towards the regular season standings.

July 17 4 (MiBT GS)	D.C. United	1–1	New England Revolution	Bay Lake, Florida
20:00 EST	Gressel (yellow card) 16'; Asad (yellow card) 45+1'; Higuaín 72'; Brillant (yellow card) 83'	Report	Buksa 51'	Stadium: ESPN Wide World of Sports Complex; Attendance: 0 (Note: All matches in the MLS Is Back Tournament were played behind closed doors due to the COVID-19 pandemic.); Referee: Joseph Dickerson
Note: Group stage match of the MLS is Back Tournament that counts towards the regular season standings.

July 21 5 (MiBT GS)	Montreal Impact	1–0	D.C. United	Bay Lake, Florida
22:30 EDT	Taïder 31'; Urruti (yellow card) 42'; Quioto (yellow card) 90+1'; Jackson-Hamel (yellow card) 90+4'	Report	Felipe (yellow card) 35'; Higuaín (yellow card) 90+2'	Stadium: ESPN Wide World of Sports Complex; Attendance: 0 Referee: Alex Chilowicz
Note: Group stage match of the MLS is Back Tournament that counts towards the regular season standings.

August 21 6	Cincinnati	0–0	D.C. United	Cincinnati, Ohio
19:30 EDT	Deplagne (yellow card) 13'; Stanko (yellow card) 37'	Report	Canouse (yellow card) 35'; Flores (yellow card) 88'; Abu (yellow card) 90+1'	Stadium: Nippert Stadium; Attendance: 0 Referee: Rubiel Vazquez
Note: Rescheduled from March 14 due to the COVID-19 pandemic

August 25 7	D.C. United	1–2	New England Revolution	Washington, D.C.
20:00 EDT	Birnbaum (yellow card) 66'; Kamara 72' (pen.); Felipe (yellow card) 90+10'	Report	Bou 26'; Bunbury 38'; Caldwell (yellow card) 83'; Buksa (yellow card) 90+5'	Stadium: Audi Field; Attendance: 0 Referee: Guido Gonzales Jr.
Note: Rescheduled from August 29.

August 29 8	Philadelphia Union	4–1	D.C. United	Chester, Pennsylvania
19:30 EDT	Przybylko 7', 16'; Martínez (yellow card) 10'; Santos 21'; Mbaizo (yellow card) 56'; Aaronson 61'; Ilsinho (yellow card) 69'; Creavalle (yellow card) 80'; Monteiro (yellow card) 87'	Report	Felipe (yellow card) 19'; Gressel 63'	Stadium: Subaru Park; Attendance: 0 Referee: Fotis Bazakos
Note: Rescheduled from March 22 due to the COVID-19 pandemic

September 2 9	New York Red Bulls	0–1	D.C. United	Harrison, New Jersey
19:30 EDT	Tarek (yellow card) 88'	Report	Brillant (yellow card) 8'; Abu (yellow card) 51'; Sorga 90+8'	Stadium: Red Bull Arena; Attendance: 0 Referee: Nima Saghafi
Note: Rescheduled from May 23 due to the COVID-19 pandemic

September 6 10	D.C. United	0–0	NYCFC	Washington, D.C.
19:00 EDT	Segura (yellow card) 16'	Report	Tinnerholm (yellow card) 76'	Stadium: Audi Field; Attendance: 0 Referee: Ted Unkel
Note: Rescheduled from April 3 due to the COVID-19 pandemic

September 12 11	D.C. United	0–2	New York Red Bulls	Washington, D.C.
19:00 EDT		Report	Long 29', (yellow card) 42'; Royer 60'; Cásseres Jr. (yellow card) 65'	Stadium: Audi Field; Attendance: 0 Referee: Marcos de Oliveira
Note: Rescheduled from April 26 due to the COVID-19 pandemic

September 19 12	D.C. United	2–2	Toronto FC	Washington, D.C.
19:00 EDT	Kamara 5'; Paredes (yellow card) 81'; Yow 88'	Report	Pozuelo 17'; DeLeon (yellow card) 25'; Piatti (yellow card) 41'; Akinola 60'; Laryea (yellow card) 67'	Stadium: Audi Field; Attendance: 0 Referee: Armando Villarreal
Note: Postponed from April 15 due to the COVID-19 pandemic

September 23 13	Nashville SC	1–0	D.C. United	Nashville, Tennessee
8:30 PM EDT	Ríos 70'; Washington (yellow card) 79'	Report	Canouse (yellow card) 37' (yellow-red card) 45+3'	Stadium: Nissan Stadium; Attendance: 0 Referee: Tori Penso
Note: Postponed from April 18 due to the COVID-19 pandemic

September 27 14	D.C. United	0–2	New England Revolution	Washington, D.C.
7:00 PM EDT	Brillant (yellow card) 45+5'; Mora (yellow card) 50'; Moreno (yellow card) 81'	Report	Bou 86'; Buksa 90', (yellow card) 90+1'	Stadium: Audi Field; Attendance: 0 Referee: Alex Chilowicz

October 3 15	D.C. United	0–4	Atlanta United FC	Washington, D.C.
7:00 PM EDT	Nyeman (yellow card) 20'; Brillant (red card) 85'; Asad (yellow card) 90+5'	Report	Gallagher 4', 65'; Bello (yellow card) 29'; Robinson (yellow card) 37'; Lennon 41'; Hyndman (yellow card) 43'; Jahn 70'	Stadium: Audi Field; Attendance: 0 Referee: Joseph Dickerson

October 7 16	New York City FC	4–1	D.C. United	New York, New York
7:00 PM EDT	Castellanos 4' (pen.), (yellow card) 81'; Tajouri-Shradi 55' (pen.), 63'; Parks 88'	Report	Kamara 12' (pen.)	Stadium: Yankee Stadium; Attendance: 0 Referee: Drew Fischer

October 11 17	Chicago Fire FC	2–1	D.C. United	Chicago, Illinois
7:30 PM EDT	Sapong 3', (yellow card) 89'; Sekulić 45+1'; Azira (yellow card) 59'; Medrán (yellow card) 90'; Shuttleworth (yellow card) 90+1'	Report	Bornstein 56' (o.g.)	Stadium: Soldier Field; Attendance: 0 Referee: Allen Chapman

October 14 18	D.C. United	2–2	Philadelphia Union	Washington, D.C.
8:00 PM EDT	Pines 71'; Asad 75' (pen.)	Report	Fontana 49'; McKenzie 87'	Stadium: Audi Field; Attendance: 0 Referee: Marcos de Oliveira

October 18 19	FC Cincinnati	1–2	D.C. United	Cincinnati, Ohio
7:30 PM EDT	Vázquez 66'	Report	Asad (yellow card) 27'; Nyeman (yellow card) 32'; Pines 36'; Odoi-Atsem 78', (yellow card) 90+3'	Stadium: Nippert Stadium; Attendance: 0 Referee: Rosendo Mendoza

October 24 20	Atlanta United FC	1–2	D.C. United	Atlanta, Georgia
4:00 PM EDT	Barco (yellow card) 39'; Gallagher 89'; Meza (yellow card) 90+1'	Report	Asad (yellow card) 30'; Canouse 77'; Moreno (yellow card) 86'; Rivas 90+2'	Stadium: Mercedes-Benz Stadium; Attendance: 6,130; Referee: Armando Villarreal

October 28 21	D.C. United	1–0	Columbus Crew	Washington, D.C.
8:00 PM EDT	Gressel 32'; Mora (yellow card) 14'; Brillant (yellow card) 17'; Sorga (yellow card) 65'; Fisher (yellow card) 74'	Report	Berhalter (yellow card) 6'; Boateng (yellow card) 88'; Cadden (yellow card) 90+4'	Stadium: Audi Field; Attendance: 0 Referee: Silviu Petrescu

November 1 22	New England Revolution	4–3	D.C. United	Foxborough, Massachusetts
7:30 PM EDT	Asad 22'; Canouse 54' (o.g.); Bunbury 67', 84'	Report	Buksa (yellow card) 14', (goal) 30'; Yow 26'; Canouse (yellow card) 29'; Rivas 75'	Stadium: Gillette Stadium; Attendance: 0 Referee: David Gantar

November 8 23	D.C. United	2–3	Montreal Impact	Washington, D.C.
3:30 PM EDT	Pines 9'; Kamara 33'	Report	Bojan 13'; Quioto (yellow card) 35' (goal) 88'; Sejdič (yellow card) 41'; Wanyama 74'; Piette (red card) 90+1'	Stadium: Audi Field; Attendance: 0 Referee: Rubiel Vazquez

=== U.S. Open Cup ===
April 22 Third round	Cancelled	TBD
TBD EST		Stadium: TBD
Note: Postponed on March 13 due to the COVID-19 pandemic. Tournament cancelled on August 16.

=== Leagues Cup ===
July 21 First round	D.C. United (United States)	Cancelled	(Mexico) TBD	Washington, D.C.
TBD EST				Stadium: Audi Field
Note: Cancelled due to the COVID-19 pandemic

=== MLS is Back Tournament ===
==== Group C ====
Group C results
Pos	Team	Pld	W	D	L	GF	GA	GD	Pts	Qualification
1	Toronto FC	3	1	2	0	6	5	+1	5	Advanced to knockout stage
2	New England Revolution	3	1	2	0	2	1	+1	5	Advanced to knockout stage
3	Montreal Impact	3	1	0	2	4	5	−1	3	Advanced to knockout stage
4	D.C. United	3	0	2	1	3	4	−1	2	

Source: MLS

July 13 1	Toronto FC	2–2	D.C. United	Bay Lake, Florida
09:00 EST	Akinola 12', 44'	Report	Moreno (yellow card) 18' (yellow-red card) 45+6'; Felipe (yellow card) 71'; Canouse (yellow card) 82'; Higuaín 84'; Brillant 90+1'	Stadium: ESPN Wide World of Sports Complex; Attendance: 0 (Note: All matches in the MLS Is Back Tournament will be played behind closed doors due to the COVID-19 pandemic in Florida.); Referee: Fotis Bazakos
Note: Rescheduled from July 10 due to delay in travel by Toronto FC

July 17 2	D.C. United	1–1	New England Revolution	Bay Lake, Florida
20:00 EST	Gressel (yellow card) 16'; Asad (yellow card) 45+1'; Higuaín 72'; Brillant (yellow card) 83'	Report	Buksa 51'	Stadium: ESPN Wide World of Sports Complex; Attendance: 0 Referee: Joseph Dickerson

July 21 3	Montreal Impact	1–0	D.C. United	Bay Lake, Florida
22:30 EDT	Taïder 31'; Urruti (yellow card) 42'; Quioto (yellow card) 90+1'; Jackson-Hamel (yellow card) 90+4'	Report	Felipe (yellow card) 35'; Higuaín (yellow card) 90+2'	Stadium: ESPN Wide World of Sports Complex; Attendance: 0 Referee: Alex Chilowicz

== Squad information ==
=== First team roster ===
Squad No.	Name	Nationality	Position(s)	Date of birth (age)	Apps	Goals	Assists	Signed from
Goalkeepers
1	Chris Seitz	(United States)	GK	March 12, 1987 (age 38)	1	0	0	(United States) Houston Dynamo
24	Bill Hamid	(United States)	GK	November 25, 1990 (age 35)	238	0	0	(Denmark) Midtjylland
36	Earl Edwards Jr.	(United States)	GK	January 24, 1992 (age 34)	0	0	0	(United States) Orlando City SC
Defenders
3	Chris Odoi-Atsem	(United States)	RB	May 27, 1995 (age 30)	13	0	0	(United States) Maryland Terrapins
13	Frédéric Brillant	(France)	CB	June 26, 1985 (age 40)	66	3	4	(United States) New York City FC
15	Steve Birnbaum	(United States)	CB	January 23, 1991 (age 35)	163	8	3	(United States) California Golden Bears
23	Donovan Pines	(United States)	CB	March 7, 1998 (age 27)	10	0	0	(United States) Maryland Terrapins
28	Joseph Mora	(Costa Rica)	LB	January 15, 1993 (age 33)	50	0	3	(Costa Rica) Saprissa
44	Axel Sjöberg	(Sweden)	CB	March 8, 1991 (age 34)	0	0	0	(United States) Columbus Crew
91	Oniel Fisher	(Jamaica)	RB	November 22, 1991 (age 34)	26	1	1	(United States) Seattle Sounders FC
Midfielders
4	Russell Canouse	(United States)	DM	June 11, 1995 (age 30)	56	1	2	(Germany) TSG 1899 Hoffenheim
5	Júnior Moreno	(Venezuela)	DM	July 20, 1993 (age 32)	49	0	5	(Venezuela) Zulia
7	Paul Arriola	(United States)	RM	February 5, 1995 (age 31)	68	14	12	(Mexico) Tijuana
8	Ulises Segura	(Costa Rica)	CM	June 23, 1993 (age 32)	56	5	3	(Costa Rica) Saprissa
10	Edison Flores	(Peru)	AM	May 14, 1994 (age 31)	0	0	0	(Mexico) Monarcas Morelia
11	Yamil Asad	(Argentina)	LM	July 24, 1994 (age 31)	30	9	8	(Argentina) Vélez Sarsfield
18	Felipe	(Brazil)	CM	September 30, 1990 (age 35)	9	0	1	(Canada) Vancouver Whitecaps FC
25	Mohammed Abu	(Ghana)	DM	November 4, 1991 (age 34)	0	0	0	(Norway) Vålerenga (loan)
27	Moses Nyeman	(United States)	CM	November 5, 2003 (age 22)	0	0	0	(United States) D.C. United Academy
30	Kevin Paredes	(Dominican Republic)	MF	May 7, 2003 (age 22)	0	0	0	(United States) D.C. United Academy
31	Julian Gressel	(Germany)	RM	December 16, 1993 (age 32)	0	0	0	(United States) Atlanta United FC
Forwards
9	Ola Kamara	(Norway)	ST	October 15, 1989 (age 36)	5	3	0	(China) Shenzhen
20	Gelmin Rivas	(Venezuela)	ST	March 23, 1989 (age 36)	0	0	0	(Turkey) MKE Ankaragücü
22	Griffin Yow	(United States)	ST	September 25, 2002 (age 23)	2	0	0	(United States) D.C. United Academy
29	Yordy Reyna	(Peru)	ST	September 17, 1993 (age 32)	0	0	0	(Canada) Vancouver Whitecaps FC
50	Erik Sorga	(Estonia)	ST	July 8, 1999 (age 26)	0	0	0	(Estonia) Flora

== Statistics ==
=== Appearances and goals ===
As of November 24, 2020

No.	Pos	Nat	Player	Total		MLS (Note: Includes three group stage matches of the MLS is Back Tournament)		U.S. Open Cup		MLS Cup	
No.	Pos	Nat	Player	Apps	Goals	Apps	Goals	Apps	Goals	Apps	Goals
1	GK	(United States) USA	Chris Seitz	6	0	6+0	0	0	0	0	0
3	DF	(United States) USA	Chris Odoi-Atsem	15	0	8+7	0	0	0	0	0
4	MF	(United States) USA	Russell Canouse	15	1	14+1	1	0	0	0	0
5	MF	(Venezuela) VEN	Júnior Moreno	20	0	20+0	0	0	0	0	0
7	MF	(United States) USA	Paul Arriola	1	0	0+1	0	0	0	0	0
8	MF	(Costa Rica) CRC	Ulises Segura	10	0	7+3	0	0	0	0	0
9	FW	(Norway) NOR	Ola Kamara	22	4	17+5	4	0	0	0	0
10	MF	(Peru) PER	Edison Flores	13	0	11+2	0	0	0	0	0
11	MF	(Argentina) ARG	Yamil Asad	23	3	18+5	3	0	0	0	0
13	DF	(France) FRA	Frédéric Brillant	19	2	18+1	2	0	0	0	0
15	DF	(United States) USA	Steve Birnbaum	10	0	10+0	0	0	0	0	0
18	MF	(Brazil) BRA	Felipe	7	0	7+0	0	0	0	0	0
20	FW	(Venezuela) VEN	Gelmin Rivas	8	2	7+1	2	0	0	0	0
22	FW	(United States) USA	Griffin Yow	12	2	4+8	2	0	0	0	0
23	DF	(United States) USA	Donovan Pines	16	1	15+1	1	0	0	0	0
24	GK	(United States) USA	Bill Hamid	17	0	17+0	0	0	0	0	0
25	MF	(Ghana) GHA	Mohammed Abu	6	0	4+2	0	0	0	0	0
27	MF	(Liberia) LBR	Moses Nyeman	11	0	5+6	0	0	0	0	0
28	DF	(Costa Rica) CRC	Joseph Mora	21	0	19+2	0	0	0	0	0
29	FW	(Peru) PER	Yordy Reyna	5	0	3+2	0	0	0	0	0
30	MF	(Dominican Republic) DOM	Kevin Paredes	17	0	9+8	0	0	0	0	0
31	MF	(Germany) GER	Julian Gressel	22	2	19+3	2	0	0	0	0
36	GK	(United States) USA	Earl Edwards Jr.	0	0	0	0	0	0	0	0
44	DF	(Sweden) SWE	Axel Sjöberg	2	0	2+0	0	0	0	0	0
50	FW	(Estonia) EST	Erik Sorga	17	1	6+11	1	0	0	0	0
91	FW	(Jamaica) JAM	Oniel Fisher	15	0	6+9	0	0	0	0	0
Players that left the club during the season:
2	MF	(Argentina) ARG	Federico Higuaín	10	2	4+6	2	0	0	0	0
17	MF	(Ghana) GHA	Ema Boateng	0	0	0	0	0	0	0	0
21	MF	(United States) USA	Chris Durkin	0	0	0	0	0	0	0	0

== Awards ==
=== MLS Team of the Week ===
Week	Player	Opponent	Position	Ref
3 (Note: Week 1 of the MLS is Back Tournament)	(France) Frédéric Brillant	Toronto FC	DF	

== Transfers and loans ==
=== Transfers in ===
No.	Pos.	Player	From	Date	Notes/Fee	Source
Winter 2019–20
11	MF	(Argentina) Yamil Asad	(Argentina) Vélez Sarsfield	September 17, 2019	Free Transfer, signed through 2022	
44	MF	(United States) Moses Nyeman	(United States) D.C. United Academy	October 3, 2019	Homegrown player	
24	GK	(United States) Bill Hamid	(Denmark) Midtjylland	December 9, 2019	$750,000 TAM, signed through 2022	
10	MF	(Peru) Edison Flores	(Mexico) Morelia	January 14, 2020	$5M Transfer Fee to Morelia, $2M per year through 2024	
30	MF	(United States) Kevin Paredes	(United States) D.C. United Academy	January 17, 2020	Homegrown player	
31	MF	(Germany) Julian Gressel	(United States) Atlanta United FC	January 21, 2020	$750,000 TAM to Atlanta, over $700,000 per year through 2023	
50	FW	(Estonia) Erik Sorga	(Estonia) Flora	February 29, 2020	$500,000	
2	MF	(Argentina) Federico Higuaín	(United States) Columbus Crew	March 2, 2020	Signed as player and assistant coach	
Summer 2020
44	DF	(Sweden) Axel Sjöberg	(United States) Columbus Crew	August 12, 2020	Traded for Emmanuel Boateng	
20	FW	(Venezuela) Gelmin Rivas	(Turkey) MKE Ankaragücü	August 31, 2020	Free Transfer	
29	FW	(Peru) Yordy Reyna	(Canada) Vancouver Whitecaps FC	September 19, 2020	$400,000 in 2021 GAM to Vancouver	

=== Transfers out ===
No.	Pos.	Player	To	Date	Notes/Fee	Source
Winter 2019–20
26	MF	(United States) Antonio Bustamante	(Bolivia) Club Blooming	November 22, 2019	Option Declined	
20	DF	(United States) Jalen Robinson	(United States) Pittsburgh Riverhounds	November 22, 2019	Option Declined	
19	MF	(Germany) Gordon Wild	(United States) LA Galaxy	November 22, 2019	Option Declined	
25	FW	(United States) Quincy Amarikwa	(United States) Las Vegas Lights	November 22, 2019	Option Declined	
6	DF	(Brazil) Marquinhos Pedroso	(Bulgaria) Botev Plovdiv	November 22, 2019	Option Declined	
9	FW	(England) Wayne Rooney	(England) Derby County	December 31, 2019	Undisclosed	
29	DF	(Argentina) Leonardo Jara	(Argentina) Boca Juniors	December 31, 2019	End of loan	
10	MF	(Argentina) Luciano Acosta	(Mexico) Atlas	January 1, 2020	Free Transfer	
21	MF	(United States) Chris Durkin	(Belgium) Sint-Truiden	May 7, 2020	Loan buyout, $1.2M to D.C. with 25% sell-on clause	
Summer 2020
17	MF	(Ghana) Emmanuel Boateng	(United States) Columbus Crew	August 12, 2020	Traded for Axel Sjoberg	
2	MF	(Argentina) Federico Higuaín	(United States) Inter Miami CF	October 9, 2020	$50,000 GAM from Miami	

=== MLS SuperDraft picks ===
2020 D.C. United SuperDraft Picks
Round	Selection	Player	Position	College	Status
1	21	(France) Simon Lefebvre	GK	Temple	signed with Loudoun United FC
2	42	(United States) Josh Fawole	FW	Loyola (MD)	signed with Loudoun United FC
3	65	(United States) Andrew Verdi	GK	Michigan	returned to college
3	69	PASS			
4	91	PASS			
4	95	PASS			

=== Loans in ===
No.	Pos.	Player	Loaned from	Start	End	Source
25	MF	(Ghana) Mohammed Abu	(Norway) Vålerenga	March 2, 2020	December 31, 2020	

== See also ==
- 2020 Loudoun United FC season
