= 2018 D.C. United season =

D.C. United
2018 season
- General manager: Dave Kasper
- Head coach: Ben Olsen
- Stadium: Audi Field
- MLS: Conference: 4th Overall: 9th
- MLS Cup Playoffs: Knockout round
- U.S. Open Cup: Fifth round
- Atlantic Cup: Runners-up
- Suncoast Invitational: Winners
- Top goalscorer: League: Rooney (12); All: Rooney (12)
- Highest home attendance: 20,573 vs. Montreal; Sep 29
- Lowest home attendance: 5,128 vs. Houston; Mar 17
- Average home league attendance: 16,006
Home colors	Away colors

The 2018 D.C. United season was D.C. United's 23rd season of existence, and their 23rd in Major League Soccer, the top flight of American soccer.

The 2018 season was the club's first season playing at Audi Field following a 22-year tenure at RFK Memorial Stadium. Prior to the midseason opening of Audi Field, United played four home matches at alternative venues: three at the Maryland SoccerPlex in Germantown, Maryland (one league match and two cup matches), and one league match at the Navy–Marine Corps Memorial Stadium.

== Review ==
=== Off season ===
D.C. United began the off-season trying to figure out how to replace long-time mainstay Bill Hamid, and try to build a much stronger defense in front of his replacement. The team did have the third slot in the 2018 MLS SuperDraft, but elected to deal the selection for allocation money. The team sent allocation money to New York City F.C. to acquire centerback Frédéric Brillant and allocation money to Seattle Sounders F.C. to acquire reserve fullback Oniel Fisher. The team also acquired Costa Rican fullback Joseph Mora. They traded for Vancouver Whitecaps F.C. keeper David Ousted. however, the team also had to find more consistent offensive production. They traded for under-used speedy Jamaican striker, Darren Mattocks and acquired another Costa Rican, midfielder Ulises Segura. The team also sought to bolster the central midfield, acquiring young Venezuelan deep-lying central midfielder Júnior Moreno. The biggest move of the off-season was to deal for Atlanta United F.C.'s attacking star Yamil Asad.

=== Early season ===
D.C. United began their most consequential season in years, with the longest road trip in team history. Twelve of the first fourteen games were on the road, as the team awaited the completion and opening of their new Buzzard Point stadium, to be called Audi Field. It was a rough start. The team opened with a hopeful draw in Orlando, including a goal by Asad, but that was followed by a 3–1 loss in Atlanta. The D.C. side than played their first regular season home game at the Maryland Soccerplex in Germantown, Maryland. The intimate setting and snowy weather made for a unique experience, but the team continued its struggles, surrendering two first-half goals. A thrilling rally, however, netted goals by Luciano Acosta and Darren Mattocks and a hard-won point. D.C. only had the two points from the two draws in five matches in March, and then lost again in Kansas City to open April. They returned to the D.C. area to play a home game at the Navy Memorial Stadium in Annapolis, Maryland. Despite scoring in the first minute. United handed the visitors a man advantage when Paul Arriola was shown a red card early in the second half. D.C. had to weather a furious assault by Columbus Crew. Thanks to heroic goalkeeping by Steve Clark, the team hung on for its first win of the year, 1–0.

The long road trip resumed, and so did the losing, with a pair of 3–2 defeats at the hands of Philadelphia Union and Real Salt Lake. D.C. finally won a game on the road, defeating the lowly San Jose Earthquakes by a 3–1 scoreline. The team seemed to be showing progress and earned a 1–1 draw in their first trip to Los Angeles to face potent expansion side LAFC. A 2–1 loss to Seattle followed as the team failed to defend a 1–0 lead after Mattocks had put the team ahead early in the second half. The pattern repeated in a trip to Toronto to face the defending league champions. D.C. actually took a 3–0 lead, which they surrendered over the course of the second half. Still a goal by Acosta in stoppage time seemed to have gained a stunning three points, but Toronto F.C. again rallied with a fourth, tying goal before the final whistle.

As fans of the team looked forward to the opening of the long-awaited, new stadium, speculation intensified that the team would make its biggest signing ever, bringing in English star Wayne Rooney. His signing was announced as June drew to a close. The road trip ended with yet another 3–2 loss, to New England Revolution and yet another draw in Los Angeles, this time a 2–2 affair against LA Galaxy.

=== Mid-season and a New Home ===
The new stadium, Audi Field, opened on July 14 in front of a sell-out crowd. A goal by Asad, assisted by Zoltan Stieber gave the team its first ever goal and first lead in the new stadium. Wayne Rooney came on as a substitute in the 58th minute, to a roaring ovation, and he immediately raised the team's level. 2 more goals followed, both by Arriola, the last giving Rooney his first assist in his first Major League Soccer match. However, a giveaway in stoppage time led to a goal by Vancouver's teenage sensation Alphonso Davies, spoiling Ousted's bid for his first clean sheet of the season.

Rooney got his first start in Atlanta, but he looked out of shape and the team failed to protect an early lead, finally losing by a familiar 3–1 scoreline in Atlanta. New York Red Bulls spoiled the second match at Audi Field, as Bradley Wright-Phillips put the visitors on top with a second-minute goal, a lead they never surrendered, despite an uncalled penalty shout for Rooney in the second half. Results did start to come though, for D.C, as they won their next four games at home, and managed a draw in Montreal. Included in that stretch was a 3–2 win over a short-handed Orlando City S.C. side, as Lucho Acosta scored a hat-trick. For all of Acosta's heroics, though, the name on everyone's lips at the end of the game was Wayne Rooney. Deep in stoppage time, United lined up a corner kick and goalkeeper Ousted pushed forward to try to get the winning goal, to break the 2–2 tie. Orlando gained possession and tried to break out of their end quickly to attack the undefended D.C end and get the winning goal themselves. Rooney ran back as the one defender who had a chance to stop the Orlando breakaway. He wasn't able to beat Wil Johnson to the ball as it rolled past midfield, but Rooney dispossessed Johnson with a sliding tackle. Rooney then rose and dribbled back in the opposite direction before a sending a long pass across the field, into the box, where Acosta was able to head it for the winning goal at the death. The post-game discussion was whether Rooney's effort was the greatest play in league history.

That thrilling finish was followed by the return of Bill Hamid to the D.C. United goalkeeper role. Hamid had struggled in Denmark and was anxious to return to the D.C. United fold. Hamid's return was marked by a pair of solid wins, 4–1 over Portland Timbers on the strength of a brace by Rooney that included his first free kick goal, and a 2–0 over New England. But the team then took some steps backward with a hard-fought 1–0 loss to the Red Bulls on a hot Sunday night on the road, followed by a tired, sluggish effort in a midweek 2–0 home loss to Philadelphia. D.C rebounded, though, with a 3–1 thumping of the league leaders, Atlanta United F.C., a road draw in Yankee Stadium against NYCFC, another home win as the team rallied to beat Minnesota United FC 2–1. That was followed by a thrilling rematch at home against the Red Bulls, D.C. took the lead three times on goals by Arriola, Rooney and Acosta, but each time they surrendered the lead on a goal by Wright-Phillips. The 3–3 draw temporarily left D.C. United 4 points off the pace for the final playoff spot, but with a game in hand over Montreal Impact, whom they would play in their next home match, to close out September.

A sell-out crowd watched D.C. United host the Montreal Impact in a crucial match in the race or the final playoff spot in the Eastern Conference. Lucho Acosta got the home side off to a good start with an impressive finish to beat the Impact 'keeper to the far post in the 17th minute. United seemed to back off after that, as the Impact pressed for much of the rest of the first half. United barely clung to the 1–0 lead at halftime, giving no hint of the explosive second half to come. Early in the second half, Acosta got the ball to Rooney, who picked his way towards the box before blistering a shot to beat the goalie at the near post. In the 61st minute, Acosta got his second assist of the game, as Rooney sent Acosta in through the Montreal defense, and Acosta then crossed the ball for Arriola to poke it for the third goal. In the 78th minute D.C. stretched its lead to 4–0 as Arriola beat the goalie to a loose ball and scored his second of the match, and giving Acosta his 3rd assist. 3 minutes later, Rooney capped off a 5–0 thrashing of Montreal, as a clearance by the Impact goalie came to Rooney. Even from 40 yards out, Rooney had little trouble scoring on an empty net. The final result was the most convincing scoreline for D.C. since a 5–0 win over New England Revolution in 2001. In the playoff chase, D.C. still trailed Montreal by 2 points, but now had 2 games in hand to make up those points, and no team was playing in better form than D.C. United. All the good feeling was a little tempered by the news later that starting right back Oniel Fisher had suffered a season-ending knee injury, but the team seemed to be in good position heading into the final month of the regular season calendar.

=== Close of the regular season ===
The final month of the regular season, October, opened with Montreal posting a 3–0 win over Columbus and Philadelphia an even bigger winner over Minnesota. The pressure was on D.C. United to win to keep on the Impact's heel for the last playoff position. Hosting Chicago Fire, D.C got off to a good start but squandered several chances in the first half, including an apparent Rooney goal, waved off for a foul after a video review. When Chicago scored in the 51st minute, it looked as if D.C. would have a long team to rue missed chances. However, in the 62nd minute, Arriola, starting at right back, sent a shot in on goal. Rooney scored on the rebound and later added a second goal to claim all 3 points with a successful Penalty Kick in the 81st minute. No ground gained in the playoff chase in this round, but D.C. knew it still controlled its own fate. D.C. would play two home matches before Montreal would again take the field, and a win in either match would put D.C. on top of Montreal in the table.

The 2018 MLS season continued even through an international break, with D.C. United playing with a very short bench, thanks to a combination of injuries, international call-ups and a pair of tragic items that struck the team in short order. Paul Arriola had been slotted to start at right back following Fisher's season-ending knee surgery, but the news of the sudden death of Arriola's father meant he was unavailable for the team's two games in over the international break. It was also announced that another potential option at right back, Chris Odoi-Atsem would undergo treatment for non-Hodgkin's lymphoma. The return of Nick DeLeon from the injured list could not have been more timely.

United managed two straight 1–0 wins at home. The first came against the Western Conference leaders F.C. Dallas. United squandered some chances and seemed destined to settle for a draw, dropping two much needed points in the playoff chase. However, in the 86th minute Russell Canouse scored his first ever MLS goal, with a header that finished off a scramble following a Canouse shot that came back off the post. In a midweek match against the defending champions, Toronto F.C., United did the deed early on when Wayne Rooney scored a memorable goal on a 40-yard free kick that curled back just inside the post. That left the team needing only 3 points in its final two games to secure a playoff spot that seemed impossible 3 months earlier, when Rooney signed with the team.

D.C. United clinched their place in the 2018 MLS Cup Playoffs in style, rounding out their 2018 home regular season campaign with a convincing win over visiting NYCFC, extending the team's unbeaten streak to nine games. The first came when Acosta went on a run from the sideline maneuvering through several defenders before cutting the ball to Rooney for a simple tap-in at the top of the six-yard box. Acosta got the honors on the second goal, as Rooney lost control of the ball about 20 yards out and Acosta stepped up and one-timed a curling shot into the corner of the NYC goal. A second-half penalty kick by Rooney extended the lead to 3–0. A late goal by David Villa ruined the clean sheet, but the final 3–1 result put D.C. in the playoffs, with a chance to claim the 4th spot in the table with a road win or draw at Chicago in the final week. D.C. was unable to score against Chicago Fire, but a 0–0 was enough to put D.C. ahead of Philadelphia into 4th place, and earned a home game in the one-game opening playoff round, against the Columbus Crew.

=== MLS Playoffs ===
Playing in front of one of the most raucous home crowds in team history, D.C. United took a 1–0 lead in the first half, when Brillant pounced on a loose ball in the box, heading it for a goal after a misplay by the Columbus Crew goalie Zack Steffen. However, a pair of defensive errors allowed Columbus to equalize before halftime. Thanks to spectacular saves by each goalie, the game remained even and went into an overtime period. Columbus went ahead early in the first overtime on a header by Federico Higuaín, his second goal of the game. D.C.'s season seemed to have been rescued when Nick DeLeon scored on a volley in the 118th minute, the latest goal in a game in team history. However, in a penalty kick shootout, Steffen saved shots from both of D.C.'s top guns, Rooney and Acosta. Hamid also saved one shot and forced former D.C. striker Patrick Mullins to hit the post with his effort. Shooting in the fifth spot, DeLeon put his shot over the crossbar, giving the Crew a 3–2 winning margin in the shootout, ending D.C. United's season.

== Club ==
=== First team roster ===
As of August 20, 2018.

No.	Name	Nat	Position	Since	Date of birth (age)	Signed from	Games	Goals
Goalkeepers
1	David Ousted	(Denmark)	GK	2018	February 1, 1985 (age 41)	(Canada) Vancouver Whitecaps FC	17	0
24	Bill Hamid	(United States)	GK	2018	November 25, 1990 (age 35)	(Denmark) Midtjylland (loan)	195	0
48	Travis Worra	(United States)	GK	2015	April 9, 1993 (age 33)	(United States) New Hampshire Wildcats	19	0
Defenders
2	Taylor Kemp	(United States)	LB	2013	July 23, 1990 (age 36)	(United States) Maryland Terrapins	107	4
3	Chris Odoi-Atsem	(United States)	RB	2017	May 28, 1995 (age 31)	(United States) Maryland Terrapins	10	0
6	Kofi Opare	(United States)	CB	2014	October 12, 1990 (age 36)	(United States) LA Galaxy	62	3
12	Kevin Ellis	(United States)	CB / RB	2018	June 30, 1991 (age 35)	(United States) Chicago Fire	0	0
13	Frédéric Brillant	(France)	CB	2017	June 26, 1985 (age 41)	(United States) New York City FC	17	0
15	Steve Birnbaum	(United States)	CB	2014	January 23, 1991 (age 35)	(United States) California Golden Bears	123	6
20	Jalen Robinson	(United States)	CB	2014	May 8, 1994 (age 32)	(United States) Wake Forest Demon Deacons	13	0
27	Vytautas Andriuškevičius	(Lithuania)	LB	2018	October 8, 1990 (age 36)	(United States) Portland Timbers	0	0
28	Joseph Mora	(Costa Rica)	LB	2018	January 15, 1993 (age 33)	(Costa Rica) Saprissa	18	0
91	Oniel Fisher	(Jamaica)	RB / LB	2018	November 22, 1991 (age 34)	(United States) Seattle Sounders FC	19	1
Midfielders
4	Russell Canouse	(United States)	CM	2017	June 11, 1995 (age 31)	(Germany) TSG 1899 Hoffenheim	18	0
5	Júnior Moreno	(Venezuela)	DM	2018	July 20, 1993 (age 33)	(Venezuela) Zulia	12	0
7	Paul Arriola	(United States)	RM / RF	2017	February 5, 1995 (age 31)	(Mexico) Tijuana	30	5
8	Ulises Segura	(Costa Rica)	CM	2017	June 23, 1993 (age 24)	(Costa Rica) Saprissa	12	1
10	Luciano Acosta	(Argentina)	AM	2016	May 31, 1994 (age 32)	(Argentina) Boca Juniors	84	13
14	Nick DeLeon	(United States)	RM / RB	2012	July 17, 1990 (age 36)	(United States) Louisville Cardinals	185	16
18	Zoltán Stieber	(Hungary)	AM / LF	2017	October 16, 1988 (age 38)	(Germany) 1. FC Kaiserslautern	28	6
21	Chris Durkin	(United States)	DM / CB	2016	February 8, 2000 (age 26)	(United States) D.C. United Academy	18	0
22	Yamil Asad	(Argentina)	AM / LF	2018	July 24, 1994 (age 32)	(Argentina) Vélez Sarsfield (loan)	22	9
23	Ian Harkes	(United States)	CM	2017	March 30, 1995 (age 31)	(United States) Wake Forest Demon Deacons	32	2
25	Jared Jeffrey	(United States)	CM	2013	June 14, 1990 (age 36)	(Germany) Mainz 05	68	5
Forwards
9	Wayne Rooney (c)	(England)	ST/ AM	2018	October 24, 1985 (age 41)	(England) Everton	8	3
11	Darren Mattocks	(Jamaica)	ST	2017	September 2, 1990 (age 36)	(United States) Portland Timbers	20	9
32	Bruno Miranda	(Bolivia)	ST	2017	December 10, 1998 (age 27)	Universidad de Chile	12	0
29	Dane Kelly	(Jamaica)	ST	2018	February 9, 1991 (age 35)	(United States) Reno 1868	1	0

=== Team management ===
Position	Staff
General Manager	Dave Kasper
Head Coach	Ben Olsen
Asst. Coach	Chad Ashton
Asst. Coach	Nolan Sheldon
Goalkeeping Coach	Zach Thornton
Director of Operations	Francisco Tobar
Team Coordinator	Rory Molleda
Director of Soccer Strategy and Analysis	Stewart Mairs
Equipment Manager	Isaac Langley
Asst. Equipment Manager	Jason Ramos
Head Athletic Trainer	Brian Goodstein
Physical Therapist	Gabriel Manoel
Soccer Operations Assistant	Michael Villalba
Team Chiropractor	Dr. Thomas Cathell
Massage Therapist	Christina Miller King

Last updated: October 30, 2017
Source: D.C. United

== Transfers ==
=== In ===
Pos.	Player	Transferred from	Type	US	Fee/notes	Date	Source
DF	(France) Frédéric Brillant	(United States) New York City FC	Transfer	Non-US	$75,000 (GAM), International Slot	December 10, 2017	
ST	(Jamaica) Darren Mattocks	(United States) Portland Timbers	Transfer	US	International Slot	December 10, 2017	
MF	(Costa Rica) Ulises Segura	(Costa Rica) Saprissa	Transfer	Non-US	$50,000 (GAM) to New York City FC for MLS discovery rights	December 21, 2017	
MF	(Venezuela) Júnior Moreno	(Venezuela) Zulia	Transfer	Non-US		January 2, 2018	
GK	(Denmark) David Ousted	(Canada) Vancouver Whitecaps FC	Trade	Non-US	2nd Round pick in the 2018 MLS SuperDraft	January 8, 2018	
DF	(Jamaica) Oniel Fisher	(United States) Seattle Sounders FC	Transfer	US	$50,000 (GAM)	February 7, 2018	
MF	(Argentina) Yamil Asad	(Argentina) Vélez Sarsfield	Loan	Non-US	$500,000 (GAM & TAM) to Atlanta United FC for MLS rights, $300,000 to Vélez Sarsfield for loan with buyout option at $700,000	February 13, 2018	
DF	(United States) Chris Odoi-Atsem		Re-sign	US		February 17, 2018	
DF	(Costa Rica) Joseph Mora	(Costa Rica) Saprissa	Transfer	Non-US		March 7, 2018	
FW	(Jamaica) Dane Kelly	(United States) Reno 1868	Transfer	US	Undisclosed	March 9, 2018	
FW	(England) Wayne Rooney	(England) Everton	Transfer	Non-US		June 28, 2018	
DF	(Lithuania) Vytautas Andriuškevičius	(United States) Portland Timbers	Transfer	Non-US	$50,000 in Targeted Allocation Money (TAM)	August 7, 2018	
GK	(United States) Bill Hamid	(Denmark) FC Midtjylland	Loan	US		August 8, 2018	
DF	(United States) Kevin Ellis	(United States) Chicago Fire	Free Agency	US		September 7, 2018	

==== Draft picks ====
Draft picks are not automatically signed to the team roster. Only trades involving draft picks and executed after the start of 2018 MLS SuperDraft will be listed in the notes. Pending any trades up to the draft, United had six selections in the SuperDraft.

2018 D.C. United SuperDraft Picks
Round	Selection	Player	Position	College	Status
4	71	(Brazil) Afonso Pinheiro	FW	Albany	Not signed
4	74	(Brazil) Rafael Andrade Santos	MF	VCU	Not signed
4	91	Pass			

Notes: D.C. United traded their first round pick (third selection overall) to Los Angeles FC for $100,000 in General Allocation Money (GAM) and $100,000 in Targeted Allocation Money (TAM).

=== Out ===
No.	Pos.	Nat.	Name	Age	Moving to	Type	Transfer window	Transfer fee	Source
28	GK	(United States)	Bill Hamid	26	(Denmark) Midtjylland	Free	Pre-season	Free	
18	FW	(United States)	Chris Rolfe	34		Retirement	Pre-season		
17	FW	(Jamaica)	Deshorn Brown	26	(Spain) Lorca	Released	Pre-season	Free	
33	MF	(Germany)	Julian Büscher	24	(United States) LA Galaxy II	Released	Pre-season	Free	
5	DF	(United States)	Sean Franklin	32	(Canada) Vancouver Whitecaps FC	Released	Pre-season	Free	
24	GK	(United States)	Eric Klenofsky	23	(United States) Richmond Kickers	Released	Pre-season	Free	
22	DF	(United States)	Chris Korb	30		Released	Pre-season	Free	
8	MF	(Ghana)	Lloyd Sam	33	(England) Wimbledon	Released	Pre-season	Free	
26	MF	(England)	Rob Vincent	27		Retirement	Pre-season	Free	
12	MF	(Ghana)	Patrick Nyarko	31		Free	Pre-season	Free	
7	MF	(Brazil)	Marcelo Sarvas	36		Free	Pre-season	Free	
16	FW	(United States)	Patrick Mullins	26	(United States) Columbus Crew	Transfer	Mid-season	$150,000 TAM	
26	GK	(United States)	Steve Clark (soccer)	32	(United States) Portland Timbers	Released	Mid-season	Free	

== Non-competitive ==
=== Preseason friendlies ===
February 8, 2018	D.C. United	1–2	Malmö FF	Bradenton, Florida
	Mattocks 56'	Report	Strandberg 85', 87'	Stadium: IMG Academy

February 17, 2018 Suncoast Invitational	D.C. United	2–1	Philadelphia Union	St. Petersburg, Florida
17:00 EST	Mattocks 14'; Acosta 89'	Report	Fabinho (yellow card) 16'; Burke 88'	Stadium: Al Lang Stadium

February 21, 2018 Suncoast Invitational	D.C. United	2–1	Jacksonville Armada	Clearwater, Florida
17:00 EST	Mullins 11'; Acosta 60'	Report	Banks 79'	Stadium: Joe DiMaggio Sports Complex

February 24, 2018	Las Vegas Lights	2–4	D.C. United	Las Vegas, Nevada
23:00 EST	Calderón 53' (pen.); Garduño 87'	Report	Asad 42'; Mattocks 51'; Harkes 80'; Acosta 90+2'	Stadium: Cashman Field; Attendance: 7,158

=== Midseason friendlies ===
April 20, 2018	Maryland Terrapins	Not reported	D.C. United	College Park, Maryland
11:00 EST		Report		Stadium: Ludwig Field

April 20, 2018	Richmond Kickers	Not reported	D.C. United	College Park, Maryland
14:00 EST				Stadium: Ludwig Field

September 19, 2018	D.C. United	1–1	Olimpia	Washington, D.C.
20:00 EST	Kelly 15'	Report	Reyes 19'	Stadium: Audi Field

== Competitive ==
=== Major League Soccer ===
==== Standings ====
===== Overall =====
Pos	Team	Pld	W	L	T	GF	GA	GD	Pts
7	New York City FC	34	16	10	8	59	45	+14	56
8	Portland Timbers	34	15	10	9	54	48	+6	54
9	D.C. United	34	14	11	9	60	50	+10	51
10	Columbus Crew	34	14	11	9	43	45	−2	51
11	Philadelphia Union	34	15	14	5	49	50	−1	50

Source: MLS
Rules for classification: 1) points; 2) total wins; 3) total goal differential; 4) total goals scored; 5) disciplinary points; 6) away goals scored; 7) away goal differential; 8) coin toss or drawing of lots

===== Eastern Conference =====
Pos	Team	Pld	W	L	T	GF	GA	GD	Pts	Qualification
2	Atlanta United FC	34	21	7	6	70	44	+26	69	Qualification for the conference semifinals
3	New York City FC	34	16	10	8	59	45	+14	56	Qualification for the knockout round
4	D.C. United	34	14	11	9	60	50	+10	51	Qualification for the knockout round
5	Columbus Crew	34	14	11	9	43	45	−2	51	Qualification for the knockout round
6	Philadelphia Union	34	15	14	5	49	50	−1	50	Qualification for the knockout round

Source: MLS

==== Results ====
March 3, 2018 1	Orlando City SC	1–1	D.C. United	Orlando, Florida
19:30 EST	Lindley (yellow card) 31'; Giro (red card) 41'; Yotun (yellow card) 81'; Pinho 90+3'	Report	Asad 32'; Birnbaum (yellow card) 45+1'; Mattocks (yellow card) 45+6'; DeLeon (yellow card) 47'	Stadium: Orlando City Stadium; Attendance: 25,527; Referee: Fotis Bazakos

March 11, 2018 2	Atlanta United FC	3–1	D.C. United	Atlanta, Georgia
15:00 EST	Martínez 24'; Garza (yellow card) 50'; Escobar (yellow card) 63'; Almirón 73'; Villalba 76'	Report	Fisher (yellow card) 36'; Mattocks 86'	Stadium: Mercedes-Benz Stadium; Attendance: 72,035

March 17, 2018 3	D.C. United	2–2	Houston Dynamo	Germantown, Maryland
15:00 EST	Acosta (yellow card) 22', (goal) 90+7'; Mattocks 50'; Mora (yellow card) 83'	Report	Alexander (yellow card) 1'; Elis 30'; Manotas 31'	Stadium: Maryland SoccerPlex; Attendance: 5,128; Referee: David Gantar

March 24, 2018 4	Columbus Crew	3–1	D.C. United	Columbus, Ohio
18:00 EDT	Abubakar (yellow card) 3'; Valenzuela 20' (yellow card) 52'; Clark 40'; Santos 42'	Report	Asad 30'	Stadium: Mapfre Stadium; Attendance: 8,443; Referee: Drew Fischer

March 31, 2018 5	Sporting Kansas City	1–0	D.C. United	Kansas City, Kansas
20:30 EDT	Gutiérrez 3'	Report		Stadium: Children's Mercy Park; Attendance: 18,624; Referee: Baldomero Toledo

April 14, 2018 7	D.C. United	1–0	Columbus Crew	Annapolis, Maryland
19:00 EDT	Segura 1'; Arriola (red card) 51'; Clark (yellow card) 84'	Report	Higuaín (yellow card) 23'; Mensah (yellow card) 84'	Stadium: Navy–Marine Corps Memorial Stadium; Attendance: 12,396; Referee: Ismail Elfath

April 28, 2018 8	Philadelphia Union	3–2	D.C. United	Chester, Pennsylvania
15:30 EDT	Ilsinho 37'; Trusty (yellow card) 44'; Sapong 60'; Elliott (yellow card) 66'; Dočkal 72'	Report	Stieber 7'; Asad (yellow card) 25'; Mattocks 70'	Stadium: Talen Energy Stadium; Attendance: 16,493; Referee: Armando Villarreal

May 12, 2018 9	Real Salt Lake	3–2	D.C. United	Sandy, Utah
21:00 EDT	Baird 21' (yellow card) 89'; Rusnák 26'; Savarino 56'	Report	Arriola 9'; Mora (red card) 22'; Birnbaum 83'; DeLeon (yellow card) 90+2'	Stadium: Rio Tinto Stadium; Attendance: 16,961; Referee: Rubiel Vazquez

May 19, 2018 10	San Jose Earthquakes	1–3	D.C. United	San Jose, California
22:30 EDT	Hoesen 43'; Jungwirth (yellow card) 90'	Report	Stieber 15'; Mattocks 20'; Asad 37'; Durkin (yellow card) 60'	Stadium: Avaya Stadium; Attendance: 17,644; Referee: Baldomero Toledo

May 26, 2018 11	Los Angeles FC	1–1	D.C. United	Los Angeles, California
22:00 EDT	Rossi 39'; Jakovic (red card) 45+2'	Report	Durkin (yellow card) 53'; Fisher (yellow card) 59'; Arriola (yellow card) 80'; Mattocks 84'; Miranda (yellow card) 85'	Stadium: Banc of California Stadium; Attendance: 22,000; Referee: Ismail Elfath

June 9, 2018 12	Seattle Sounders FC	2–1	D.C. United	Seattle, Washington
20:00 EDT	Lodeiro 57'; Alonso (yellow card) 70'; Wolff 83'	Preview	Mattocks 53'	Stadium: CenturyLink Field; Attendance: 39,465; Referee: Sorin Stoica

June 13, 2018 6	Toronto FC	4–4	D.C. United	Toronto, Ontario
20:00 EDT	Auro Jr. (yellow card) 39'; Osorio 56'; Vázquez 64'; Hagglund 86', 90+2'	Report	Asad 12', 90'; Arriola 17' (yellow card) 89'; Mattocks 45'	Stadium: BMO Field; Attendance: 23,011; Referee: Robert Sibiga
Note: Rescheduled from April 7 due to Toronto FC participating in the 2018 CONCACAF Champions League.

June 30, 2018 13	New England Revolution	3–2	D.C. United	Foxborough, Massachusetts
19:30 EDT	Penilla 18', 78' (pen.); Mlinar (yellow card) 27'; Caicedo (yellow card) 41'; Bunbury 45+1'	Report	Asad 42', 73' (pen.); Mattocks (yellow card) 77'; Fisher (yellow card) 78'	Stadium: Gillette Stadium; Attendance: 19,371; Referee: Allen Chapman

July 4, 2018 14	LA Galaxy	2–2	D.C. United	Carson, California
22:30 EDT	Ibrahimović 5'; Pontius 25'; Kitchen (yellow card) 30'; Hušidić (yellow card) 87'	Report	Stieber 26'; Durkin (yellow card) 29'; Mora (yellow card) 80'; Mattocks 85'	Stadium: StubHub Center; Attendance: 25,462; Referee: Silviu Petrescu

July 14, 2018 15	D.C. United	3–1	Vancouver Whitecaps FC	Washington, D.C.
19:00 EDT	Arriola (yellow card) 12' (goal) 69', 80'; Asad 27'; Brillant (yellow card) 31'	Report	Juárez (yellow card) 38'; Felipe (yellow card) 62'; Davies 90+4'	Stadium: Audi Field; Attendance: 20,504; Referee: Hilario Grajeda
Note: Club's first ever match at Audi Field.

July 21, 2018 16	Atlanta United FC	3–1	D.C. United	Atlanta, Georgia
15:30 EDT	Martínez 30', 54', 73'	Report	Stieber 8'; Arriola (yellow card) 49'; Rooney (yellow card) 50'; Durkin (yellow card) 78'	Stadium: Mercedes-Benz Stadium; Attendance: 45,087; Referee: Drew Fischer

July 25, 2018 17	D.C. United	0–1	New York Red Bulls	Washington, D.C.
21:30 EDT	Arriola (yellow card) 32'	Report	Wright-Phillips 2' (yellow card) 3'; Adams (yellow card) 90+3'	Stadium: Audi Field; Attendance: 15,655; Referee: Armando Villarreal
Note: Two-hour delay due to lightning.

July 28, 2018 18	D.C. United	2–1	Colorado Rapids	Washington, D.C.
19:00 EDT	Rooney 33'; Jackson 90' (o.g.)	Report	Wilson (yellow card) 66'; McBean (yellow card) 74'; Acosta 82'; Jackson (yellow card) 90+1'; Price (yellow card) 90+7'	Stadium: Audi Field; Attendance: 18,931; Referee: Ramy Touchan

August 4, 2018 19	Montreal Impact	1–1	D.C. United	Montreal, Quebec
19:30 EDT	Piatti (yellow card) 2' Mancosu 5'	Report	Asad 70' Canouse (yellow card) 75' Birnbaum (yellow card) 78'	Stadium: Saputo Stadium; Attendance: 19,152; Referee: Ismail Elfath

August 12, 2018 20	D.C. United	3–2	Orlando City SC	Washington, D.C.
18:00 EDT	Acosta 45+4', 64', 90+6', (yellow card) 90+6'; Birnbaum (yellow card) 49'	Report	Ousted 50' (o.g.); Higuita (red card) 55'; Dwyer 71'; Tarek (yellow card) 86'	Stadium: Audi Field; Attendance: 17,020; Referee: José Carlos Rivero

August 15, 2018 21	D.C. United	4–1	Portland Timbers	Washington, D.C.
19:30 EDT	Arriola (yellow card) 33'; Rooney 43', 68'; Fisher 47'; Canouse (yellow card) 72'; Acosta (yellow card) 73'; Mattocks 90+1', (yellow card) 90+2'	Report	Armenteros 35'	Stadium: Audi Field; Attendance: 18,219; Referee: Robert Sibiga

August 19, 2018 22	D.C. United	2–0	New England Revolution	Washington, D.C.
18:00 EDT	Acosta 13'; Canouse (yellow card) 58'; Steiber 89'	Report	Caicedo (yellow card) 12'; Agudelo (yellow card) 29'; Caldwell (yellow card) 56' (yellow-red card) 73'	Stadium: Audi Field; Attendance: 20,198; Referee: Ted Unkel

August 26, 2018 23	New York Red Bulls	1–0	D.C. United	Harrison, New Jersey
19:00 EDT	Wright-Phillips (yellow card) 9'; Gamarra (yellow card) 37', (goal) 56'	Report	Stieber (yellow card) 63'; Arriola (yellow card) 88'; Wright-Phillips (yellow card) 90+4'	Stadium: Red Bull Arena; Attendance: 22,324; Referee: David Gantar

August 29, 2018 24	D.C. United	0–2	Philadelphia Union	Washington, D.C.
19:30 EDT	Birnbaum (yellow card) 90+2'	Report	Elliot (yellow card) 27'; Sapong 29'; Dočkal (yellow card) 57'; Picault 61'	Stadium: Audi Field; Attendance: 17,692; Referee: Nima Saghafi

September 2, 2018 25	D.C. United	3–1	Atlanta United FC	Washington, D.C.
19:30 EDT	Acosta 29', 77'; Rooney 52' (pen.); Moreno (yellow card) 73'	Report	Remedi (yellow card) 25'; Larentowicz 39'; Barco (yellow card) 51'; González Pirez (yellow card) 71'	Stadium: Audi Field; Attendance: 20,557; Referee: Allen Chapman (United States)

September 8, 2018 26	New York City FC	1–1	D.C. United	New York City, New York
15:30 EDT	Tinnerholm (yellow card) 24'; Callens (yellow card) 78'; Villa 86'	Report	Birnbaum 58'; Opare (yellow card) 90'	Stadium: Yankee Stadium; Attendance: 28,239

September 12, 2018 27	D.C. United	2–1	Minnesota United FC	Washington, D.C.
19:30 EDT	Canouse (yellow card) 56'; Segura 65'; Mattocks 69'; Mora (yellow card) 90+5'	Report	Rodríguez 47'; Danladi (yellow card) 72'; Ibarra (yellow card) 87'	Stadium: Audi Field; Attendance: 16,114; Referee: Silviu Petrescu

September 16, 2018 28	D.C. United	3–3	New York Red Bulls	Washington, D.C.
13:00 EDT	Arriola 25'; Rooney 64'; Acosta 87'	Report	Wright-Phillips 41', 76', 90'; Rzatkowski (yellow card) 69'; Romero Gamarra (yellow card) 90+6'; Murillo (yellow card) 90+7'	Stadium: Audi Field; Attendance: 18,331; Referee: Alan Kelly

September 29, 2018 29	D.C. United	5–0	Montreal Impact	Washington, D.C.
19:00 EDT	Acosta 17'; Rooney 48', 82'; Arriola 61', 78'	Report		Stadium: Audi Field; Attendance: 20,573

October 7, 2018 30	D.C. United	2–1	Chicago Fire	Washington, D.C.
13:00 EDT	Rooney 62', 81' (pen.)	Report	Edwards 51'; Schweinsteiger (yellow card) 90+4'	Stadium: Audi Field; Attendance: 20,064; Referee: Ismail Elfath

October 13, 2018 31	D.C. United	1–0	FC Dallas	Washington, D.C.
15:30 EDT	Canouse 86'	Report		Stadium: Audi Field; Attendance: 19,610; Referee: José Carlos Rivero

October 17, 2018 32	D.C. United	1–0	Toronto FC	Washington, D.C.
19:30 EDT	Rooney 18'	Report	Zavaleta (yellow card) 87'	Stadium: Audi Field; Attendance: 18,562; Referee: Allen Chapman

October 21, 2018 33	D.C. United	3–1	New York City FC	Washington, D.C.
15:00 EDT	Rooney 8', 74' (pen.); Acosta 24'	Report	Castellanos (yellow card) 66'; Villa 78'; Matarrita (yellow card) 90+4'	Stadium: Audi Field; Attendance: 20,249; Referee: Hilario Grajeda

October 28, 2018 34	Chicago Fire	0–0	D.C. United	Bridgeview, Illinois
16:30 EDT		Report		Stadium: Toyota Park; Attendance: 19,459; Referee: Nima Saghafi

=== MLS Cup Playoffs ===
==== Preliminary round ====
November 1, 2018 Preliminary round	D.C. United	2–2 (a.e.t.) (2–3 p)	Columbus Crew	Washington, D.C.
20:00 EDT	Brillant 21'; DeLeon 116'	Report	Higuaín 30', (yellow card) 45', (goal) 96' Sosa (yellow card) 105+1'	Stadium: Audi Field; Attendance: 20,600; Referee: Allen Chapman
	Penalties
	Rooney (penalty missed); Asad (penalty scored); Stieber (penalty scored); Acosta (penalty missed); DeLeon (penalty missed)		(penalty scored) Higuaín; (penalty scored) Trapp; (penalty missed) Zardes; (penalty scored) Hansen; (penalty missed) Mullins

=== U.S. Open Cup ===
June 6, 2018 Fourth round	D.C. United	1–1 (a.e.t.) (4–3 p)	North Carolina FC	Germantown, Maryland
19:00 EST	Harkes 25' (yellow card) 80'	Report	Lomis 83'; Kandziora (yellow card) 109'; Smith (yellow card) 120+1'	Stadium: Maryland SoccerPlex; Attendance: 3,118; Referee: Matthew Franz
	Penalties
	Asad (penalty scored); Mattocks (penalty scored); Acosta (penalty scored); Harkes (penalty missed); Miranda (penalty scored)		(penalty scored) Ríos; (penalty missed) Bekker; (penalty scored) Lomis; (penalty missed) Doue; (penalty scored) Tobin

June 20, 2018 Fifth round	D.C. United	1–1 (a.e.t.) (2–4 p)	Orlando City SC	Germantown, Maryland
19:00 EST	Acosta 10' (Mattocks); Fisher (yellow card) 24'; Durkin (yellow card) 52' (yellow-red card) 99'	Report	Meram 17' (Kljestan); El-Munir (yellow card) 116'; Mueller (yellow card) 117'	Stadium: Maryland SoccerPlex; Attendance: 3,254; Referee: Marcos de Oliveira
	Penalties
	Asad (penalty missed); Acosta (penalty missed); Harkes (penalty scored); Mullins (penalty scored)		Johnson (penalty scored); Kljestan (penalty scored); Mueller (penalty scored); Villarreal (penalty missed); Colmán (penalty scored)

== Player statistics ==
As of October 22, 2018

No.	Pos.	Name	MLS			MLS Cup			Open Cup			Total			Discipline	
No.	Pos.	Name	Apps	Goals	Asst.	Apps	Goals	Asst.	Apps	Goals	Asst.	Apps	Goals	Asst.	Yellow card	Red card
1	GK	(Denmark) Ousted	17+0	0	0	0	0	0	1+0	0	0	18	0	0	0	0
2	DF	(United States) Kemp	0	0	0	0	0	0	0	0	0	0	0	0	0	0
3	DF	(United States) Odoi-Atsem	0+1	0	0	0	0	0	0	0	0	1	0	0	0	0
4	MF	(United States) Canouse	17+3	1	1	1	0	0	0	0	0	21	0	0	4	0
5	MF	(Venezuela) Moreno	17+3	0	2	1	0	0	0+2	0	0	23	0	2	1	0
6	DF	(Canada) Opare	10+1	0	0	0	0	0	0	0	0	11	0	0	1	0
7	MF	(United States) Arriola	25+3	7	8	1	0	0	1+0	0	0	30	7	8	7	1
8	MF	(Costa Rica) Segura	14+8	2	1	1	0	0	0	0	0	23	2	1	1	0
9	ST	(England) Rooney (c)	18+2	12	7	1	0	0	0	0	0	21	12	7	1	0
10	MF	(Argentina) Acosta	32+1	10	17	1	0	0	1+1	1	0	36	11	17	3	0
11	FW	(Jamaica) Mattocks	14+9	10	0	0+1	0	0	1+1	0	1	26	10	1	3	0
12	DF	(United States) Ellis	0+2	0	0	0	0	0	0	0	0	2	0	0	0	0
13	DF	(France) Brillant	24+0	0	1	1	1	0	1+0	0	0	26	1	1	1	0
14	MF	(United States) DeLeon	12+3	0	1	0+1	1	0	0	0	0	16	1	1	2	0
15	DF	(United States) Birnbaum	34+0	2	1	0	0	0	2+0	0	0	37	2	0	4	0
16	FW	(United States) Mullins	2+8	0	1	0	0	0	0+1	0	0	11	0	1	0	0
18	MF	(Hungary) Stieber	21+6	5	7	0+1	0	0	1+0	0	0	29	5	7	1	0
20	DF	(United States) Robinson	5+0	0	0	0	0	0	1+1	0	0	7	0	0	0	0
21	MF	(United States) Durkin	16+7	0	1	0	0	0	2+0	0	0	25	0	1	6	1
22	MF	(Argentina) Asad	27+3	9	8	1	0	0	2+0	0	1	33	9	9	1	0
23	MF	(United States) Harkes	4+4	0	1	0	0	0	2+0	1	0	10	1	1	1	0
24	GK	(United States) Hamid	14+0	0	0	1	0	0	0	0	0	15	0	0	0	0
25	MF	(United States) Jeffrey	0+2	0	0	0	0	0	0	0	0	2	0	0	0	0
26	GK	(United States) Clark	3+0	0	0	0	0	0	1+0	0	0	4	0	0	1	0
27	DF	(Lithuania) Vytas	0	0	0	0	0	0	0	0	0	0	0	0	0	0
28	DF	(Costa Rica) Mora	28+2	0	2	1	0	0	2+0	0	0	33	0	2	2	1
29	FW	(Jamaica) Kelly	0+1	0	0	0	0	0	1+0	0	0	2	0	0	0	0
32	FW	(Bolivia) Miranda	0+7	0	1	0	0	0	1+0	0	0	8	0	1	1	0
48	GK	(United States) Worra	0	0	0	0	0	0	0	0	0	0	0	0	0	0
91	DF	(Jamaica) Fisher	20+4	1	1	0	0	0	2+0	0	0	26	1	0	4	0

=== Most goals ===
The list is sorted by shirt number when total goals are equal.

Rnk	Pos	No.	Player	MLS	MLS Cup	USOC	Total
1	FW	9	(England) Wayne Rooney	12	0	0	12
2	MF	10	(Argentina) Luciano Acosta	10	0	1	11
3	FW	11	(Jamaica) Darren Mattocks	10	0	0	10
4	MF	22	(Argentina) Yamil Asad	9	0	0	9
5	MF	7	(United States) Paul Arriola	7	0	0	7
6	MF	18	(Hungary) Zoltán Stieber	5	0	0	5
7	MF	8	(Costa Rica) Ulises Segura	2	0	0	2
7	DF	15	(United States) Steve Birnbaum	2	0	0	2
9	DF	13	(France) Frédéric Brillant	0	1	0	1
9	DF	14	(United States) Nick DeLeon	0	1	0	1
9	MF	23	(United States) Ian Harkes	0	0	1	1
9	DF	91	(Jamaica) Oniel Fisher	1	0	0	1
Own Goals			Jackson (FC Dallas)	1	0	0	1
Total				59	2	2	63

Updated: November 4, 2018

=== Most assists ===
Players in italics left the club during the season.

Rnk	Pos	No.	Player	MLS	MLS Cup	USOC	Total
1	MF	10	(Argentina) Luciano Acosta	17	0	0	17
2	MF	23	(Argentina) Yamil Asad	8	0	1	9
3	MF	7	(United States) Paul Arriola	8	0	0	8
4	FW	9	(England) Wayne Rooney	7	0	0	7
4	MF	18	(Hungary) Zoltán Stieber	7	0	0	7
6	MF	5	(Venezuela) Junior Moreno	2	0	0	2
6	DF	28	(Costa Rica) Joseph Mora	2	0	0	2
8	MF	8	(Costa Rica) Ulises Segura	1	0	0	1
8	DF	13	(France) Frédéric Brillant	1	0	0	1
8	DF	14	(United States) Nick DeLeon	1	0	0	1
8	MF	21	(United States) Chris Durkin	1	0	0	1
8	FW	32	(Bolivia) Bruno Miranda	1	0	0	1
8	FW	16	(United States) Patrick Mullins	1	0	0	1
8	FW	23	(United States) Ian Harkes	1	0	0	1
8	FW	11	(Jamaica) Darren Mattocks	0	0	1	1

Updated: September 30, 2018

== Awards ==
=== MLS Player of the Week ===
Week	Player	Opponent	Ref.
24	Luciano Acosta	Orlando City SC	
25	Wayne Rooney	Portland Timbers, New England Revolution	
31	Luciano Acosta	Montreal Impact	

=== MLS Goal of the Week ===
Week	Player	Opponent	Ref.
4	Yamil Asad	Columbus Crew	
16	Paul Arriola	Toronto FC	
20	Yamil Asad	Vancouver Whitecaps FC	

=== MLS Team of the Week ===
Week	Player	Pos.	Ref.
3	Luciano Acosta	Bench	
7	Steve Clark	Goalkeeper	
12	Chris Durkin	Midfielder	
12	Luciano Acosta	Bench	
13	Paul Arriola	Bench	
16	Yamil Asad	Midfielder	
16	Paul Arriola	Bench	
20	Paul Arriola	Midfielder	
20	Zoltán Stieber	Bench	
22	Russell Canouse	Midfielder	
23	Luciano Acosta	Bench	
24	Wayne Rooney	Forward	
24	Luciano Acosta	Midfielder	
25	Ben Olsen	Coach	
25	Luciano Acosta	Midfielder	
25	Russell Canouse	Midfielder	
27	Luciano Acosta	Midfielder	
27	Bill Hamid	Goalkeeper	
27	Paul Arriola	Bench	
28	Steve Birnbaum	Defender	
28	Bill Hamid	Bench	
28	Russell Canouse	Bench	
29	Luciano Acosta	Midfielder	
31	Wayne Rooney	Forward	
31	Luciano Acosta	Midfielder	
31	Paul Arriola	Bench	
31	Bill Hamid	Bench	
32	Wayne Rooney	Forward	
33	Yamil Asad	Midfielder	
34	Wayne Rooney	Forward	
34	Luciano Acosta	Midfielder	

== See also ==
- 2018 Richmond Kickers season
