= Joseph Mora =

Costa Rican football player (born 1993)

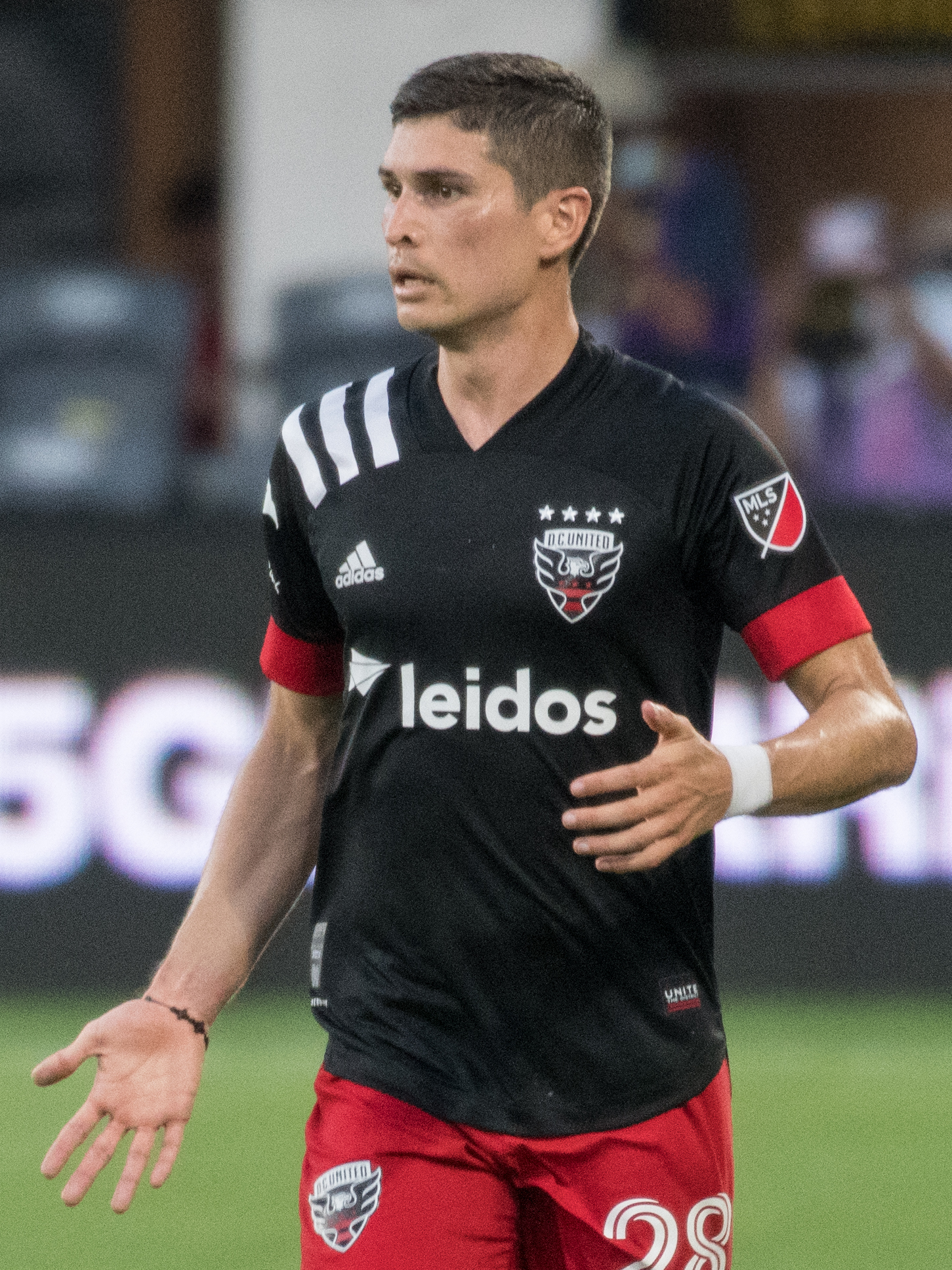
- Mora with D.C. United in 2021

Personal information
- Full name: Joseph Martín Mora Cortéz
- Date of birth: 15 January 1993 (age 33)
- Place of birth: Carrizal, Costa Rica
- Height: 1.75 m (5 ft 9 in)
- Position: Left-back

Team information
- Current team: Deportivo Saprissa
- Number: 5

Youth career
- –2011: Alajuelense

Senior career*
Years	Team	Apps	(Gls)
2011–2012	Belén	15	(1)
2012–2013	Uruguay de Coronado	11	(0)
2013–2015	Belén	41	(0)
2015–2018	Saprissa	73	(1)
2018–2021	D.C. United	97	(0)
2022–2023	Charlotte FC	27	(0)
2024–	Saprissa	75	(2)

International career^{‡}
2009	Costa Rica U17	3	(0)
2011–2013	Costa Rica U20	20	(1)
2014	Costa Rica U21	3	(0)
2011–2015	Costa Rica U22	9	(0)
2015	Costa Rica U23	3	(0)
2018–	Costa Rica	22	(1)
- * Club domestic league appearances and goals as of 2 November 2025 (UTC) ‡ National team caps and goals as of 14 October 2025 (UTC)

Joseph Martín Mora Cortéz (born 15 January 1993) is a Costa Rican professional footballer who plays as a left-back for the Costa Rica national team.

== Club career ==
=== Early career ===
Mora made his senior debut with Belén in Costa Rica, at the end of the 2011 Invierno. He finished the year with 15 appearances, including a run of 11 starts in the Verano tournament. After the season, Mora moved to C.S. Uruguay, who were promoted from the second division. He made 10 appearances in the Invierno as Uruguay finished three points from qualifying for the second stage, but made just one appearance in the Verano and returned to Belén after the season. The 2013–14 season would be his best with Belén, as he made 34 appearances with the club, including 21 out of 22 in the Invierno.

=== Saprissa ===
In advance of the 2015 Verano, Mora was signed by Costa Rican Deportivo Saprissa, who were just coming off a tournament victory in the Invierno. Mora made his debut on March 2 against UCR, and would go on to make 4 appearances in the league that season with Saprissa. He also tallied his first CONCACAF Champions League appearance, coming off the bench against Mexican side Club América at the Estadio Azteca.

Saprissa qualified for the second stage by finishing first in the Verano, but lost to Alajuelense in a reversal of the events which occurred in the Invierno. After the season, Mora was invited to train with Polish club Legia Warsaw, but he remained with Saprissa. Mora was unused by Saprissa the following season until December while he was away with Costa Rica's olympic qualifying team.

He appeared in the club's final two games of the season, and following the suspension center-back Andrés Imperiale due to yellow card accumulation, Mora was given an opportunity to start in the second leg of the semifinal against Herediano. Saprissa lost 2–0, but advanced to the final against Alajuelense. Mora came off the bench in the first leg to replace Imperiale, and Saprissa would go on to win their 32nd league title. An injury early in the following campaign to regular left-back Francisco Calvo opened the door for Mora, and he was given a run of 7 starts by manager Carlos Watson, who was his former manager at Uruguay. Mora was given one more start the rest of the season, but an injury to Calvo allowed Mora to appear in the second stage against Alajuelense. However, Mora picked up his fifth yellow card of the season in the first leg, and was suspended for the second leg as Saprissa bowed out of the competition.

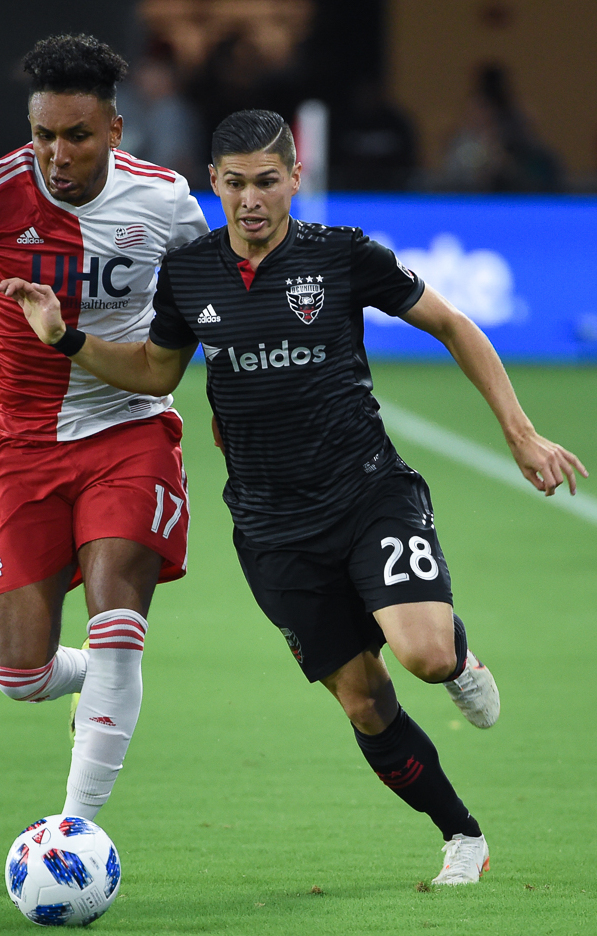
Joseph Mora chasing after a ball against the New England Revolution

Mora appeared in 11 games in the 2016 Invierno, and appeared 4 times in the first season of the league's new format, the quadrangular, which Saprissa won. As regular season champions, Saprissa did not have to play in a two-legged final, and directly won their 33rd league title. Mora also appeared in two of La S's group stage matches in the CONCACAF Champions League, as Saprissa advanced past Portland Timbers of MLS and C.D. Dragón of El Salvador. Following Calvo's departure to Minnesota United, Mora began the 2017 Verano as Saprissa's left-back.

He picked up an injury on February 5 against Alajuelense, but he returned to fitness in time to face CF Pachuca in the quarterfinals of the Champions League on February 22. The first leg finished 0–0, although Saprissa had a claim for a penalty when Mora was taken down in the area by Érick Aguirre Mora would miss the quarterfinal due to injury, and ended up missing the next five league matches before returning on March 24 against UCR. Mora finished with 14 appearances in the first stage, which Saprissa won, and started the first five matches of the quadrangular, picking up an injury against Herediano. He recovered in time for the second leg of the final against Herediano, but was substituted off as Saprissa lost 5–0 on aggregate. Mora would make 14 appearances the following season, including scoring his first goal for the club against Liberia on November 19. He made 5 appearances in the now renamed Clausura, in addition to starting both legs of their Champions League duel with Club América before making his move to the United States.

=== D.C. United ===
Mora was acquired by Major League Soccer side D.C. United on March 7, 2018, joining former Saprissa teammate Ulises Segura, who was signed in December. Interested in Mora earlier in the off-season, United had to wait for Saprissa's Champions League hopes to fade, which happened after they lost the first leg against América 4–0. His touch, athleticism, and attacking prowess all lauded by the club, United were keen to incorporate Mora, and he was inserted as the team's left-back ahead of Oniel Fisher after less than two weeks of training, making his debut on March 17 against Houston Dynamo.

Mora was sent off in his sixth game for the club, coming on May 12 against Real Salt Lake. Following his suspension, Mora was left on the bench by manager Ben Olsen, but was immediately called into action when Nick DeLeon picked up what ended up being a long-term knee injury against Los Angeles FC on May 27. Mora started the team's final 20 games at left-back, as D.C. United surged to a fifth-place finish in the Eastern Conference on the back of their long run of home games at the new Audi Field and their summer acquisition of former England forward Wayne Rooney. D.C. United lost in the first round of the playoffs against Columbus Crew SC on penalties.

On March 31, Joseph's jaw was broken during a game against Orlando City SC. After nearly out for three months, Mora finally returned to the field for D.C. United in a U.S. Open Cup game against the Philadelphia Union on June 12, 2019. After returning to the squad, Mora appeared 16 times in the remaining 17 regular season games, starting in 14 of the games. Mora and D.C. United finished 5th place in the eastern conference, and was set to face Toronto FC in the 2019 MLS Cup Playoffs. Mora started against Toronto and was subbed off for Emmanuel Boateng in the 87th minute. D.C. United lost to Toronto 5–1, ending D.C. United's 2019 season.

In the beginning of the 2020 season, Mora started in the season-opener against the Colorado Rapids. The next week Mora suffered a hamstring injury during a game against Inter Miami. Following the 2021 season, Mora was released by D.C. United.

=== Charlotte FC ===
On 14 December 2021, Mora was selected by Charlotte FC in the 2021 MLS Expansion Draft. Mora was waived by Charlotte on 8 August 2023.

== International career ==
Mora appeared in the 2009 FIFA U-17 World Cup and the 2011 FIFA U-20 World Cup, starting all of the team's matches in both tournaments. He also appeared in the 2011 CONCACAF U-20 Championship which served as the qualifying tournament for the U-20 World Cup. Costa Rica advanced to the final of that tournament against Mexico, and Mora scored the opening goal of the match. Costa Rica conceded a minute later, and Mexico went on to win 3–1.

Mora's third tournament of 2011 would be the Pan American Games, in which Costa Rica finished fourth. Mora played with the under-21 team at the 2013 Central American Games in Costa Rica, as the hosts finished runners-up to Honduras. Mora was not included in the squad for the 2013 CONCACAF U-20 Championship, but did appear in the 2014 Central American and Caribbean Games in Veracruz as Costa Rica went out in the group stage. Mora played in the 2015 Toulon Tournament with Costa Rica, who did not advance out of the group stage. Mora took part in Costa Rica's attempt to qualify for the Olympics in 2016. They advanced out of Central American qualifying zone, but fell in the group stage at the CONCACAF Qualifying Championship.

Having amassed 38 youth caps, Mora was given his first senior call-up for a set of friendlies in November against Chile and Peru. He made his debut against Chile, coming on as a late substitute for Rónald Matarrita.

== Personal life ==
On August 2, 2019, Mora obtained a Green card.

== Career statistics ==
=== Club ===
As of match played 2 November 2020

Appearances and goals by club, season and competition
Club	Season	League			National cup		Continental		Other		Total	
Club	Season	Division	Apps	Goals	Apps	Goals	Apps	Goals	Apps	Goals	Apps	Goals
Belén	2011–12	Liga FPD	15	1	—		—		—		15	0
Uruguay de Coronado	2012–13	Liga FPD	11	0	—		—		—		11	0
Belén	2013–14	Liga FPD	29	0	—		—		—		29	0
Belén	2014–15	Liga FPD	7	0	—		—		—		7	0
Belén	Total		51	0	0	0	0	0	0	0	51	0
Saprissa	2014–15	Liga FPD	4	0	—		1 (Note: Appearance(s) in CONCACAF Champions League)	0	—		5	0
Saprissa	2015–16	Liga FPD	14	0	—		—		—		14	0
Saprissa	2016–17	Liga FPD	35	0	—		3	0	—		38	0
Saprissa	2017–18	Liga FPD	24	1	—		2	0	—		26	1
Saprissa	Total		77	1	0	0	6	0	0	0	83	1
D.C. United	2018	MLS	30	0	2	0	—		—		32	0
D.C. United	2019	MLS	20	0	2	0	—		1 (Note: Appearance(s) in MLS Cup Playoffs)	0	23	0
D.C. United	2020	MLS	21	0	—		—		—		21	0
D.C. United	Total		71	0	4	0	0	0	1	0	76	0
Saprissa	2023–24	Liga FPD	21	1	—		2	0	—		23	1
Saprissa	2024–25	Liga FPD	42	1	—		2	0	6 (Note: Appearance(s) in Central American Cup)	0	50	1
Saprissa	2025–26	Liga FPD	12	1	—		—		3	0	15	1
Saprissa	Total		75	3	—		4	0	9	0	88	3
Career total			285	4	4	0	10	0	10	0	309	4

=== International ===
As of match played 14 October 2025

Appearances and goals by national team and year
National team	Year	Apps	Goals
Costa Rica	2018	2	0
Costa Rica	2019	1	0
Costa Rica	2020	1	0
Costa Rica	2021	2	0
Costa Rica	2024	5	0
Costa Rica	2025	11	1
Total		22	1

Scores and results list Chile's goal tally first, score column indicates score after each Mora goal.

List of international goals scored by Joseph Mora
No.	Date	Venue	Opponent	Score	Result	Competition
1.	7 June 2025	Wildey Turf, Bridgetown, Barbados	Bahamas	0–2	0–8	2026 FIFA World Cup qualification

== Honours ==
Saprissa

- Liga FPD: Apertura 2015, Apertura 2016, Clausura 2018
