= Frédéric Brillant =

French footballer (born 1985)

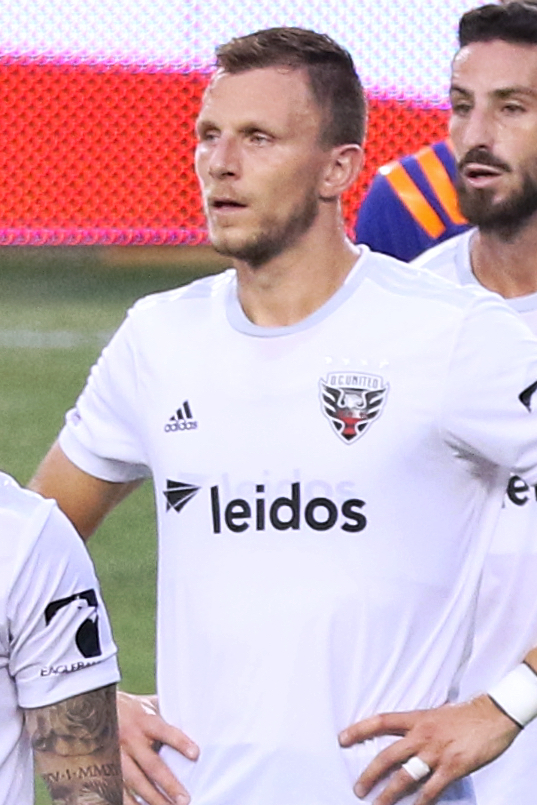
- Brillant with D.C. United in 2018

Personal information
- Full name: Frédéric Brillant
- Date of birth: 26 June 1985 (age 41)
- Place of birth: Sedan, France
- Height: 1.90 m (6 ft 3 in)
- Position: Defender

Youth career
- Sedan

Senior career*
Years	Team	Apps	(Gls)
2005–2010	RE Bertrix	122	(7)
2011–2012	Oostende	32	(6)
2012–2013	Beerschot	31	(1)
2013–2016	Oostende	79	(6)
2016–2017	New York City	54	(2)
2018–2021	D.C. United	99	(5)
Total		417	(27)

Managerial career
- 2022: Loudoun United (assistant)
- 2022–2023: D.C. United (assistant)
- 2024: Utah Royals (assistant)
- 2024: DC Power
- * Club domestic league appearances and goals as of 15 November 2021

Frédéric Brillant (born 26 June 1985) is a French former footballer and coach. He has played most of his career with clubs in Belgium and in the United States.

== Career ==
=== Belgium ===
Brillant started his professional career with RE Bertrix in the lower divisions of Belgium. He then joined second-division side Oostende in 2011. Brillant then made it to the top-flight Belgium league, Belgian First Division A by joining Beerschot in 2012. After his former club, KV Oostende was promoted to the first division, Brillant re-joined Oostende in 2013.

Brillant appeared in 127 games in total for Oostende, and contributed 13 goals and one assist.

=== New York City ===
Brillant was acquired by New York City from the Belgian team Oostende on 28 January 2016 on a free transfer and scored his first MLS goal against Orlando City SC on 29 May 2016. He was released by New York at the end of their 2017 season.

=== D.C. United ===
He was signed to a two-year contract by D.C. United on 10 December 2017. On 1 November 2018, Brillant scored his first goal for D.C. United against the Columbus Crew with a header in the first round of the MLS 2018 Playoffs. Brillant finished his first year for D.C. United with 27 games played, 24 starts and a contribution of one assist. Brillant scored his second goal for D.C. United against Seattle Sounders FC on 22 September 2019. The goal was assisted by Wayne Rooney.

For his consistency with D.C., he was featured MLS's Team of the Week three weeks in a row in 2019.

On 10 December 2019, he signed a two-year contract extension with the club. In 2021, Brillant's playing time began to decline after the acquisition of Brendan Hines-Ike and the rise of Donovan Pines in the starting lineup. Following the 2021 season, Brillant was released by D.C. United.

=== Coaching ===
On 11 January 2022, Brillant announced his retirement from playing and professional football, and would be taking up a role as assistant coach to Loudoun United.

On 22 April 2022 it was announced that Brillant had been hired as an assistant coach for D.C. United, his former club.

On 13 March 2024 Brillant was announced as an assistant coach for the Utah Royals of the NWSL, an expansion side in its inaugural season.

On 20 May 2024, Brillant was announced as the head coach for DC Power FC of the newly-formed USL Super League

Power FC and Brillant parted ways on 27 November 2024, after posting a record of 3 wins, 6 losses, and 4 draws.

== Career statistics ==
=== Club ===
As of match played 8 November 2020

Appearances and goals by club, season and competition
Club	Season	League			National Cup		Playoffs		Other		Total	
Club	Season	Division	Apps	Goals	Apps	Goals	Apps	Goals	Apps	Goals	Apps	Goals
RE Bertrix	2010–11	Belgian Third Division	30	3	1	0	0	0	—		31	3
Oostende	2011–12	Belgian Second Division	33	6	2	0	2	0	—		37	6
Beerschot	2012–13	Belgian First Division	28	1	—		3	0	—		31	1
Oostende	2013–14	Belgian First Division	29	2	1	0	5	1	—		35	3
Oostende	2014–15	Belgian First Division	28	2	2	1	6	1	—		36	4
Oostende	2015–16	Belgian First Division	11	0	1	0	—		—		12	0
Oostende	Total		101	10	6	1	13	2	0	0	120	13
New York City	2016	MLS	31	1	—		2	0	—		33	1
New York City	2017	MLS	23	1	1	0	2	0	—		26	1
New York City	Total		54	2	1	0	4	0	0	0	59	2
D.C. United	2018	MLS	27	0	1	0	1	0	—		29	0
D.C. United	2019	MLS	34	2	2	0	1	0	—		37	2
D.C. United	2020	MLS	16	1	—		1	0	3 (Note: Appearance(s) in MLS is Back Tournament)	1	20	2
D.C. United	Total		77	3	3	0	3	0	3	1	86	4
Career total			290	19	11	1	22	2	3	1	326	23
