= Chris Durkin =

American soccer player (born 2000)

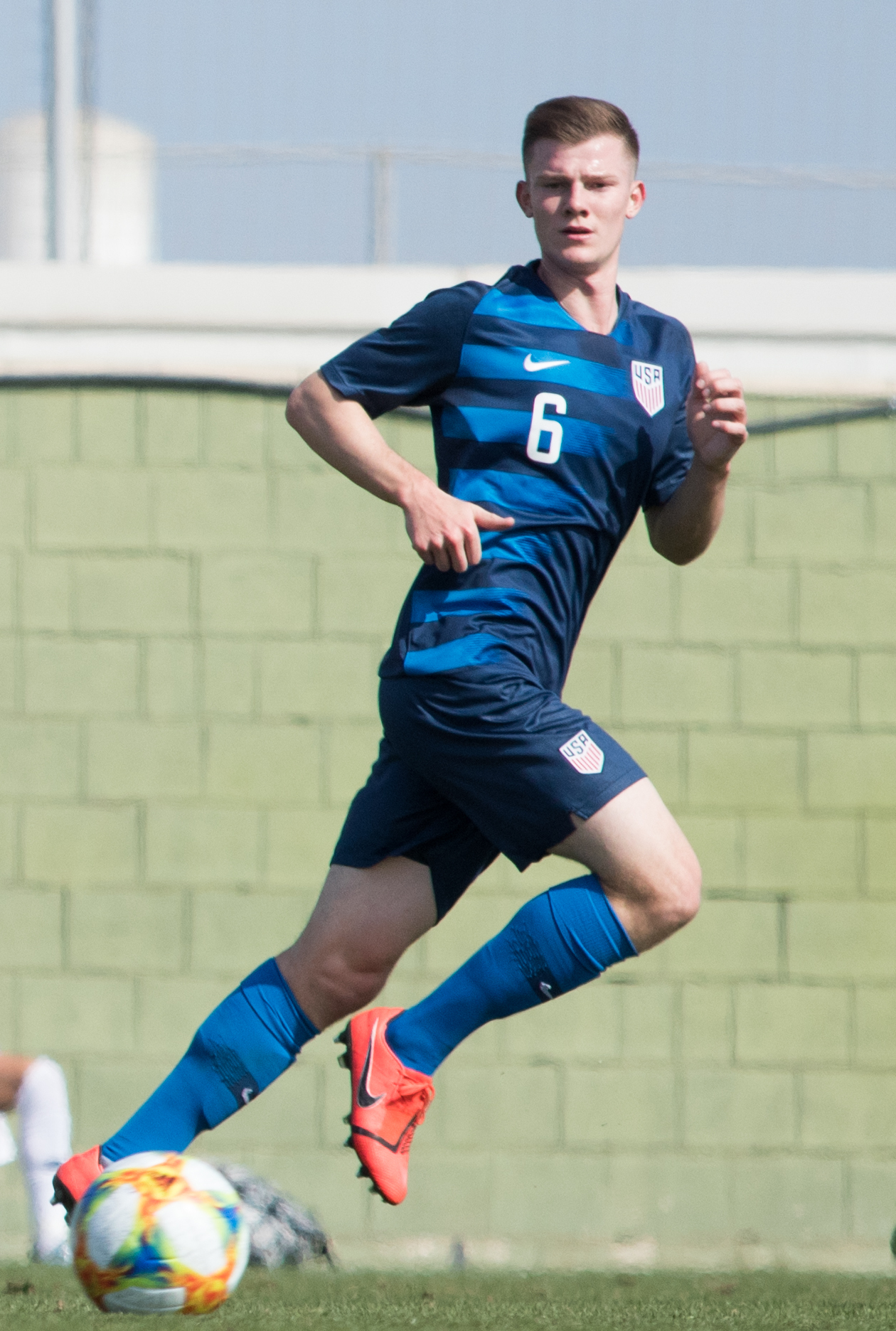
- Durkin with the United States U20 in 2019

Personal information
- Full name: Christopher James Durkin
- Date of birth: February 8, 2000 (age 26)
- Place of birth: Hampton, Virginia, United States
- Height: 6 ft 0 in (1.83 m)
- Position: Defensive midfielder

Team information
- Current team: St. Louis City
- Number: 8

Youth career
- 2008–2013: Richmond Kickers
- 2013–2016: D.C. United

Senior career*
| Years | Team | Apps | (Gls) |
| 2015 | Richmond Kickers | 1 | (0) |
| 2016–2020 | D.C. United | 36 | (1) |
| 2016–2017 | → Richmond Kickers (loan) | 14 | (0) |
| 2019–2020 | → Sint-Truiden (loan) | 13 | (1) |
| 2020–2022 | Sint-Truiden | 55 | (1) |
| 2022–2023 | D.C. United | 60 | (4) |
| 2024– | St. Louis City | 46 | (1) |
| 2025– | St. Louis City 2 | 1 | (0) |

International career
| 2015–2017 | United States U17 | 14 | (2) |
| 2018–2019 | United States U20 | 7 | (0) |
- * Club domestic league appearances and goals as of October 22, 2025

Christopher James Durkin (born February 8, 2000) is an American professional soccer player who plays as a defensive midfielder for Major League Soccer club St. Louis City.

== Professional ==
=== Richmond Kickers ===
After spending time with the youth sides of Richmond Kickers and D.C. United, Durkin signed with United Soccer League side Richmond Kickers on March 27, 2015. He made his professional debut in a friendly match against English Premier League club West Bromwich Albion F.C.

=== D.C. United ===
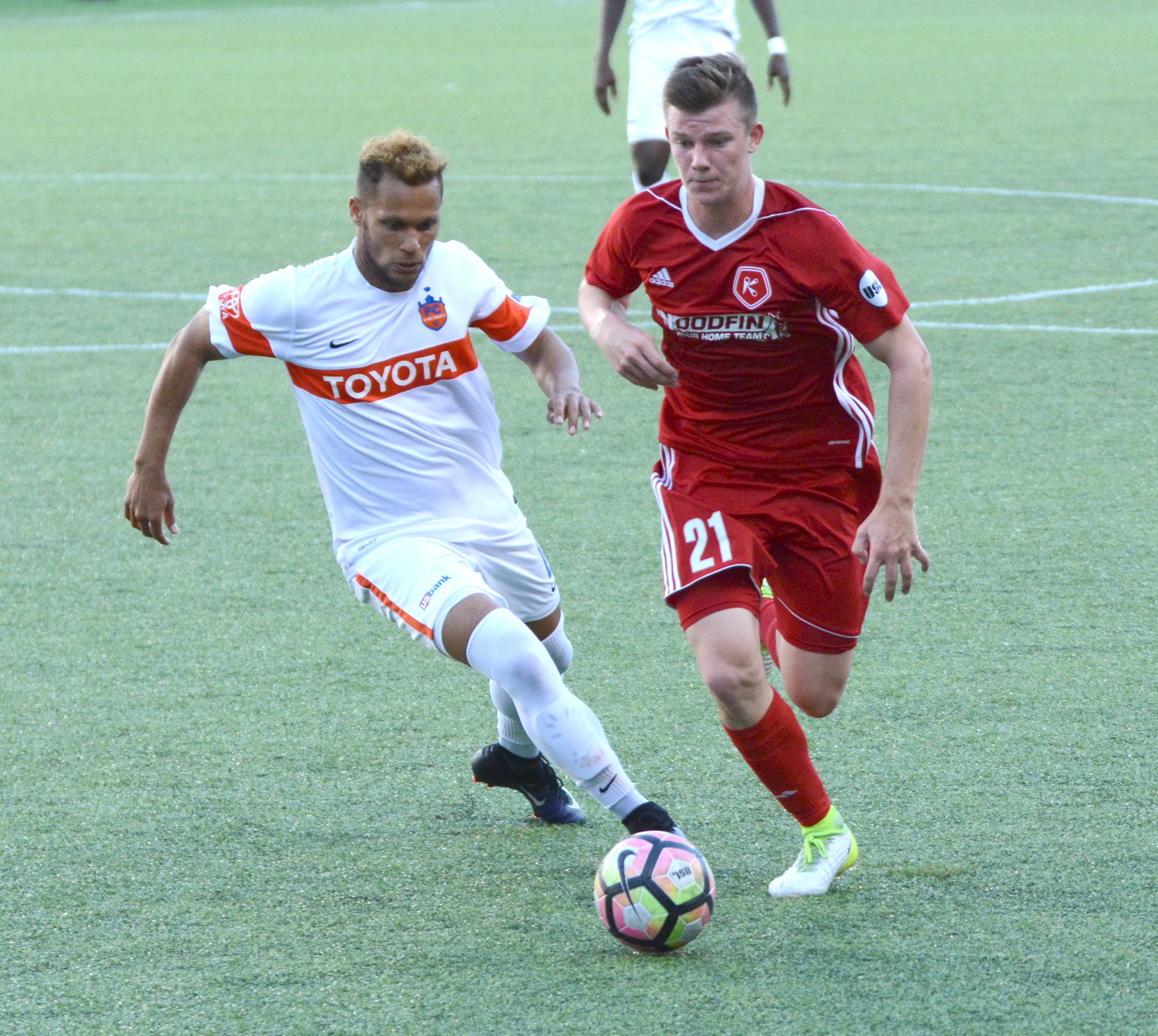
Durkin (right) competing for the ball in a 2017 Richmond Kickers match against FC Cincinnati

On June 14, 2016, D.C. United signed Durkin, making him the sixth homegrown player in D.C. United history and the fifth-youngest homegrown signing in the history of the league (16 years, 127 days). Durkin debuted for D.C. United on June 15, 2016, during a Lamar Hunt U.S. Open Cup fourth round tournament fixture, going 86 minutes against the Fort Lauderdale Strikers.

On March 3, 2018, Durkin made his Major League Soccer debut against Orlando City, coming on in the 73rd minute for Yamil Asad. Just a few weeks later on March 24, 2018, Durkin made his first professional start for United, going the entire 90 minutes in a 3–1 loss against Columbus Crew.

He was ranked #14 in MLSsoccer.com's 2018 22-Under-22 Rankings which identifies the league's top young talents.

On April 13, 2019, Durkin scored his first MLS goal in a start against the Colorado Rapids.

=== Sint-Truiden ===
On August 30, 2019, Durkin officially joined Belgian First Division A side Sint-Truiden on a loan that lasts until June 2020. Durkin debuted for Sint-Truiden in a 2–0 win against Oud-Heverlee Leuven in the Belgian Cup on September 25, 2019.

Durkin earned his first Belgian Pro League start for Sint-Truiden in a 2–1 loss against Club Brugge KV on December 7, 2019. Durkin scored his first goal for Sint-Truiden on February 8, 2020, in a 5–2 win over KAS Eupen. On May 7, 2020, Durkin's move to Sint-Truiden was made permanent for a reported transfer fee of $1.1 million.

=== Return to D.C. United ===
On March 24, 2022, Durkin returned to D.C. United. Houston Dynamo selected his rights with the second spot in the Allocation Order and traded those rights to United in exchange for $325,000 in General Allocation Money as well as the number ten allocation slot. United also paid a reported fee of $600,000 to bring him back to the United States.

After scoring a late equalizer in the club's 2023 week three match against Orlando, Durkin was named to the league's Team of the Matchday.

=== St. Louis City SC ===
On December 12, 2023, St. Louis City SC announced that they had traded 2 players for Chris Durkin.

== International ==
Durkin played for the U.S. Under-17 team at the 2017 CONCACAF U-17 Championship and the 2017 FIFA U-17 World Cup. Prior to the World Cup, Durkin wore the captain's armband for a number of friendly matches as well as in the group stage match against El Salvador in the CONCACAF Championship. Durkin scored his first goal for the U.S. Under-17 team in a group stage match against Jamaica, and again in the U-17 World Cup against the host country of India.

Durkin was named to the roster of the U.S. men's national Under-20 soccer team during the first-ever U.S. Soccer Men's YNT Summit Camp in Lakewood Ranch, Florida from January 2–11, 2018. Born in 2000, Durkin was among five players called up to the U-20 roster (birth year 1999) who were playing one year above their natural age group (U-19).

After being selected for the USMNT U-20 roster for the 2019 FIFA U-20 World Cup, Durkin started and played in the first two group stage matches.

== Statistics ==
=== Club ===
As of October 6, 2024

| Club | Season | League | | | Playoffs | | National cup (Note: Includes U.S. Open Cup, Belgian Cup) | | Continental | | Other | | Total | |
| Club | Season | Division | Apps | Goals | Apps | Goals | Apps | Goals | Apps | Goals | Apps | Goals | Apps | Goals |
|---|---|---|---|---|---|---|---|---|---|---|---|---|---|---|
| Richmond Kickers | 2015 | USL | 1 | 0 | — | | — | | — | | — | | 1 | 0 |
| D.C. United | 2016 | MLS | 0 | 0 | — | | 1 | 0 | — | | — | | 1 | 0 |
| D.C. United | 2017 | MLS | 0 | 0 | — | | 1 | 0 | — | | — | | 1 | 0 |
| D.C. United | 2018 | MLS | 23 | 0 | — | | 2 | 0 | — | | — | | 25 | 0 |
| D.C. United | 2019 | MLS | 13 | 1 | — | | 1 | 0 | — | | — | | 14 | 1 |
| D.C. United | Total | | 36 | 1 | — | | 5 | 0 | — | | — | | 41 | 1 |
| Richmond Kickers (loan) | 2016 | USL | 3 | 0 | — | | — | | — | | — | | 3 | 0 |
| Richmond Kickers (loan) | 2017 | USL | 11 | 0 | — | | — | | — | | — | | 11 | 0 |
| Richmond Kickers (loan) | Total | | 14 | 0 | — | | — | | — | | — | | 14 | 0 |
| Sint-Truiden (loan) | 2019–20 | Belgian Pro League | 13 | 1 | — | | 2 | 0 | — | | — | | 15 | 1 |
| Sint-Truiden | 2020–21 | Belgian Pro League | 28 | 1 | — | | 2 | 0 | — | | — | | 30 | 1 |
| Sint-Truiden | 2021–22 | Belgian Pro League | 27 | 0 | — | | — | | — | | — | | 27 | 0 |
| Sint-Truiden | Total | | 55 | 1 | — | | 2 | 0 | — | | — | | 57 | 1 |
| D.C. United | 2022 | MLS | 29 | 1 | — | | 1 | 0 | — | | — | | 30 | 1 |
| D.C. United | 2023 | MLS | 31 | 3 | — | | 2 | 0 | — | | 3 (Note: Appearances in Leagues Cup) | 0 | 36 | 3 |
| D.C. United | Total | | 60 | 4 | — | | 3 | 0 | — | | 3 | 0 | 66 | 4 |
| St. Louis City | 2024 | MLS | 28 | 1 | — | | — | | 2 (Note: Appearances in CONCACAF Champions Cup) | 0 | 4 | 0 | 34 | 1 |
| St. Louis City | 2025 | MLS | 0 | 0 | 0 | 0 | — | | — | | 0 | 0 | 0 | 0 |
| St. Louis City | Total | | 28 | 1 | 0 | 0 | — | | 2 | 0 | 4 | 0 | 34 | 1 |
| Career total | | | 207 | 8 | 0 | 0 | 12 | 0 | 2 | 0 | 7 | 0 | 228 | 8 |

== Honours ==
St. Louis City SC

- U.S. Open Cup: 2026
