= Paul Arriola =

American soccer player (born 1995)

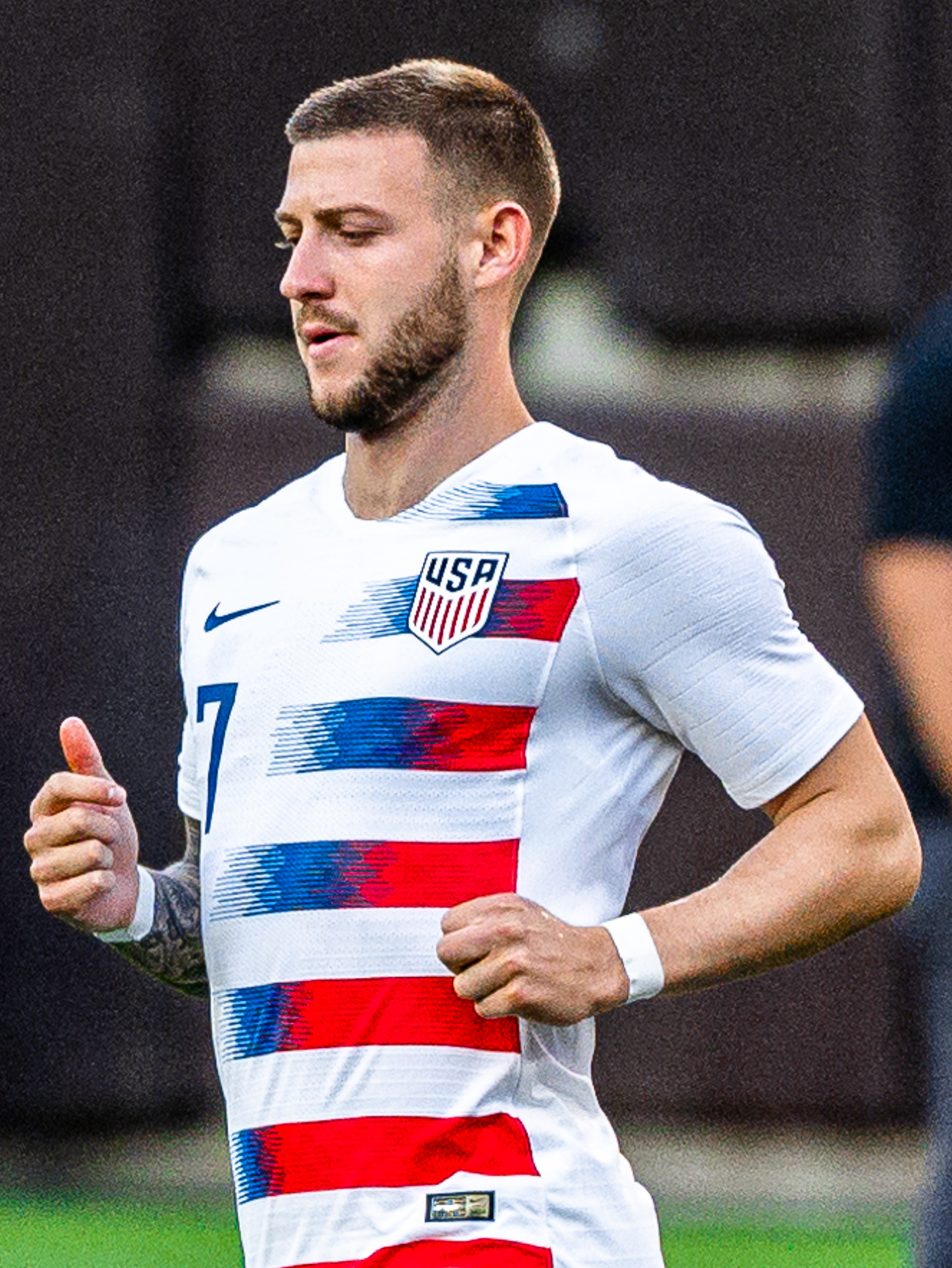
- Arriola with the United States at the 2019 CONCACAF Gold Cup

Personal information
- Full name: Paul Joseph Arriola
- Date of birth: February 5, 1995 (age 31)
- Place of birth: Chula Vista, California, United States
- Height: 5 ft 6 in (1.68 m)
- Position: Winger

Team information
- Current team: Seattle Sounders FC
- Number: 17

Youth career
- 2010–2011: IMG Soccer Academy
- 2011–2012: Arsenal FC (California)
- 2012–2013: LA Galaxy

Senior career*
| Years | Team | Apps | (Gls) |
| 2013–2017 | Tijuana | 80 | (4) |
| 2017–2021 | D.C. United | 89 | (20) |
| 2021 | → Swansea City (loan) | 2 | (0) |
| 2022–2024 | FC Dallas | 85 | (17) |
| 2025– | Seattle Sounders FC | 3 | (0) |

International career^{‡}
| 2010–2011 | United States U17 | 6 | (0) |
| 2012 | United States U18 | 5 | (1) |
| 2014–2015 | United States U20 | 17 | (2) |
| 2016 | United States U23 | 1 | (0) |
| 2016–2023 | United States | 50 | (10) |
Medal record
Representing United States
| Winner | CONCACAF Gold Cup | 2021 |
| Winner | CONCACAF Gold Cup | 2017 |
| Runner-up | CONCACAF Gold Cup | 2019 |
- * Club domestic league appearances and goals as of March 9, 2025 ‡ National team caps and goals as of January 28, 2023

Paul Joseph Arriola (born February 5, 1995) is an American professional soccer player who plays as a winger for Major League Soccer club Seattle Sounders FC.

== Early life ==
Arriola was born in Chula Vista, California, a suburb of San Diego, to Dawn and Art Arriola. Arriola attended Mater Dei Catholic High School in Chula Vista and iHigh Virtual Academy in San Diego. Arriola holds a Mexican passport which he obtained through his great-grandparents who were born there.

== Club career ==
=== Youth ===
Arriola spent years with U.S. Soccer Development Academy club Arsenal FC based in Temecula, California, a club that has produced several successful players including Carlos Bocanegra and Hector Jiménez, before joining the academy of the Los Angeles Galaxy in 2013.

=== Tijuana ===
In December 2012, Arriola was invited to train with Tijuana, after having previously trialed with the club. Following the 2012 season and despite being offered a professional contract by the Galaxy, Arriola opted to sign for Club Tijuana of Liga MX, the highest level of soccer in Mexico. Arriola was part of a string of American-born players to join the Xolos including Edgar Castillo, Herculez Gomez, Joe Corona, and Greg Garza. The Galaxy listed Tijuana's proximity to Arriola's hometown of San Diego, 18 miles, as one factor contributing to his decision to opt for Tijuana over the Galaxy. About his decision, Arriola himself stated, ""I felt that Xolos was the place for me. I love the club, it's my home team and the people down there are wonderful." The decision allowed Arriola to live on the United States side of the border with his family but cross it for training and matches.

Arriola made his debut for the club in a preseason friendly against Club América at Petco Park in San Diego on July 6, 2013. In the 54th minute, Arriola scored to make the score 5–0 in an eventual 5–2 victory for Tijuana. On July 19, 2013, Arriola made his professional league debut in a 3–3 draw with Club Atlas to open the 2013–14 Liga MX season. Arriola was a second-half substitute and assisted on Darío Benedetto's goal only four minutes after entering the match. Just a few days later, Arriola scored his second professional goal in CONCACAF Champions League against C.D. Victoria.

=== D.C. United ===
On August 9, 2017, Arriola signed for Major League Soccer side D.C. United for a club record fee of $3,000,000 plus allocation money for his rights to LA Galaxy. Arriola debuted for United on August 13, 2017, in a 1–0 loss against Real Salt Lake. He scored his first goal for D.C. United in their season finale, and last game in RFK Stadium on October 22, 2017, against the New York Red Bulls. The game ended in a 2–1 loss. He ended his 2017 season with D.C. United with 11 appearances, two assists and only one goal. In the 2018 D.C. United season, Arriola's performances greatly improved. On July 14, 2018, in a 3–1 win against Vancouver Whitecaps, Arriola scored a personal record two goals for United in their inaugural match at Audi Field. He ended the 2018 season with 28 appearances, 7 goals, and 8 assists.

Arriola became a key player at D.C. United. Under Ben Olsen's management, Paul became more flexible in his positioning on the right and started playing both right midfielder and right back.

During a 2020 pre-season game against Orlando City on February 15, 2020, Arriola suffered a serious knee injury. His injury was later revealed as a partially torn ACL. On February 22, D.C. United announced that Arriola was expected to miss the entire 2020 MLS season. On July 27, 2020, Arriola and D.C. United agreed to a multi-year contract extension through the 2023 season and an option for the 2024 season. Arriola returned to the field from his injury in D.C. United's last regular season game which ended in a 2–3 loss against Montreal Impact on November 8, 2020, ending playoff hopes.

==== Loan to Swansea City ====
On February 1, 2021, Arriola moved to Swansea City until the end of the 2020–21 EFL Championship season. He made his debut on February 10, 2021, in a 1–3 loss against Manchester City in the 5th round of the 2020–21 FA Cup. On March 31, 2021, Arriola's loan with Swansea ended after sustaining a quadriceps injury that would sideline him for 4–6 weeks.

=== FC Dallas ===
On January 26, 2022, FC Dallas traded for Arriola in exchange for $1.5 million in General Allocation Money in 2022 and $500,000 in 2023. D.C. United would also retain 30% of any transfer outside of MLS, with an additional $300,000 in General Allocation Money if Arriola reaches certain performance-based metrics.

=== Seattle Sounders FC ===
On January 12, 2025, Arriola moved to Seattle Sounders FC.

== International career ==
Arriola has been part of the United States youth national team set ups and was part of the squad for the 2011 CONCACAF U-17 Championship but did not appear in any matches because of an injury. The United States went on to win the tournament. He made three starts in four matches at the 2011 FIFA U-17 World Cup in Mexico. In 2013, Arriola joined the United States U18 squad for a trip to Europe for friendlies against France and Uruguay. Despite playing for the youth teams of the United States, Arriola applied for Mexican citizenship which would allow him to play as a domestic player in Liga MX rather than occupying one of the five foreign player spots.

Arriola made the United States U20 squad at the 2014 Dallas Cup and 2014 NTC Invitational. Arriola made the United States U20 squad for the 2015 FIFA U-20 World Cup, appearing in four of the team's five matches and scoring a goal in a 4–0 rout of hosts New Zealand in the group stage.

Arriola made the United States U23 squad for the Olympic qualifiers versus Colombia's U23 team. After not playing the first match on March 25, he started and played 45 minutes in the second leg at Toyota Stadium in Frisco, Texas. The United States U23 lost the series 3–2 on aggregate.

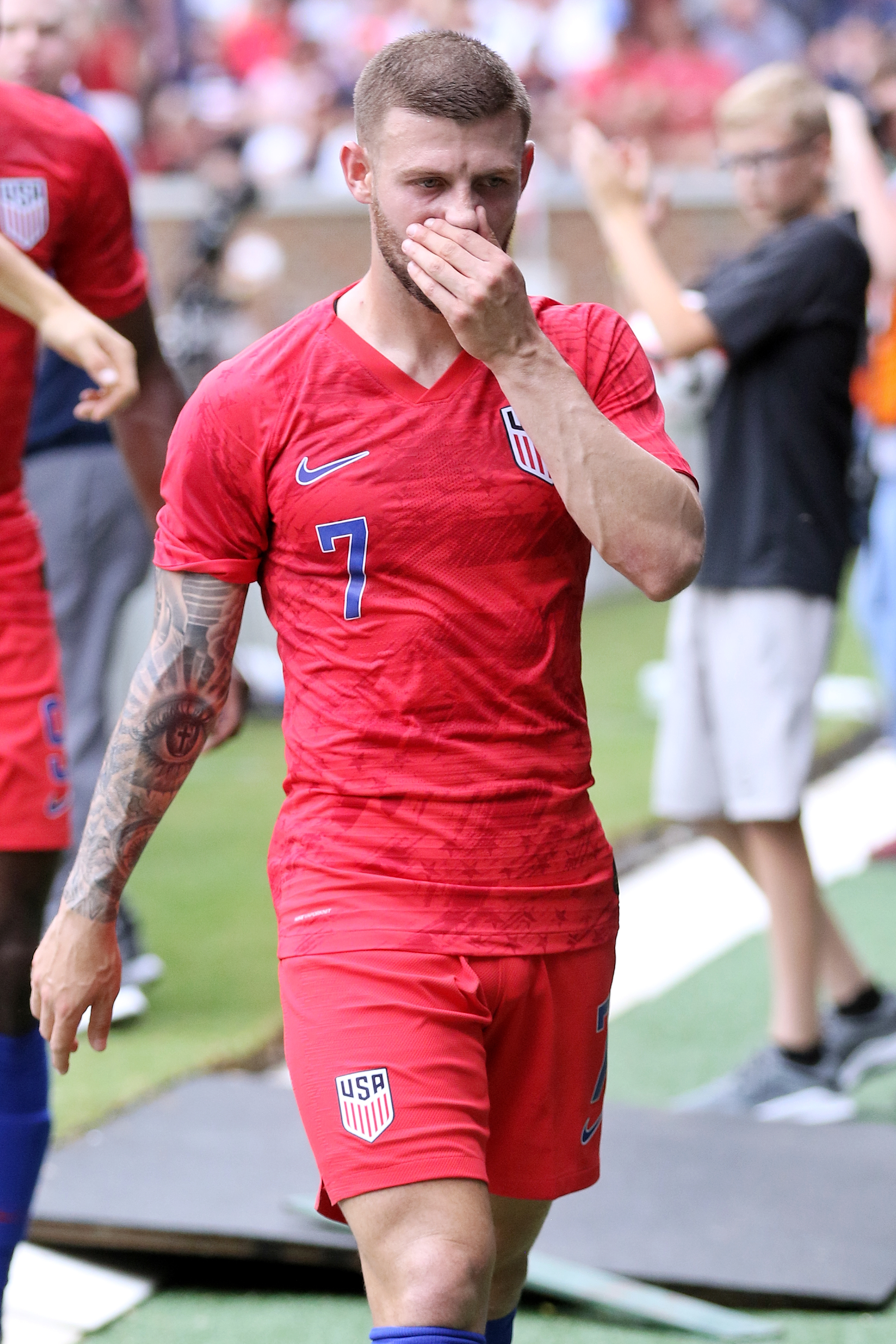
Paul Arriola with the USMNT.

Arriola made his senior team debut on May 22, 2016, against Puerto Rico, scoring his first international goal and notching an assist for a Bobby Wood goal.

Arriola scored his fourth international goal in the opening game of the 2019 CONCACAF Gold Cup against Guyana at Allianz Field in Saint Paul, Minnesota. The goal was assisted by teammate Weston McKennie, his first international assist, and was the team's first goal of the tournament and the first goal scored in a competitive match under the recently appointed coach Gregg Berhalter. In the same match, Arriola had a shot which deflected off a defender before ricocheting off of teammate Gyasi Zardes' face and into the goal and recorded an assist for Tyler Boyd's second goal.

Arriola scored a header in USMNT's penultimate game in 2021-22 Concacaf World Cup qualifying, where the USMNT defeated Panama 5–1, virtually guaranteeing a spot in Qatar. However, he was omitted from the final World Cup squad for Qatar.

== Personal life ==
In October 2018, Arriola's father died from a heart attack. He had flown home right away and missed two matches during the push for an MLS playoff berth.

On January 6, 2023, Arriola married his girlfriend, Akela Banuelos in Rancho Palos Verdes, California.

== Career statistics ==
=== Club ===
As of match played March 11, 2025

Appearances and goals by club, season and competition
| Club | Season | League | | | League cup (Note: Includes Liga MX Playoffs and MLS Cup Playoffs) | | National cup (Note: Includes Copa MX, U.S. Open Cup and FA Cup) | | Continental (Note: Includes CONCACAF Champions Cup and Leagues Cup) | | Total | |
| Club | Season | Division | Apps | Goals | Apps | Goals | Apps | Goals | Apps | Goals | Apps | Goals |
|---|---|---|---|---|---|---|---|---|---|---|---|---|
| Tijuana | 2013–14 | Liga MX | 20 | 1 | — | | — | | 5 | 2 | 25 | 3 |
| Tijuana | 2014–15 | Liga MX | 5 | 0 | — | | 8 | 0 | — | | 13 | 0 |
| Tijuana | 2015–16 | Liga MX | 26 | 1 | — | | 11 | 2 | — | | 37 | 3 |
| Tijuana | 2016–17 | Liga MX | 28 | 2 | 3 | 0 | — | | — | | 31 | 2 |
| Tijuana | 2017–18 | Liga MX | 1 | 0 | — | | 1 | 1 | — | | 2 | 1 |
| Tijuana | Total | | 80 | 4 | 3 | 0 | 20 | 3 | 5 | 2 | 108 | 9 |
| D.C. United | 2017 | Major League Soccer | 11 | 1 | — | | — | | — | | 11 | 1 |
| D.C. United | 2018 | Major League Soccer | 28 | 7 | 1 | 0 | 1 | 0 | — | | 30 | 7 |
| D.C. United | 2019 | Major League Soccer | 29 | 6 | 1 | 0 | — | | — | | 30 | 6 |
| D.C. United | 2020 | Major League Soccer | 1 | 0 | — | | — | | — | | 1 | 0 |
| D.C. United | 2021 | Major League Soccer | 20 | 6 | — | | — | | — | | 20 | 6 |
| D.C. United | Total | | 89 | 20 | 2 | 0 | 1 | 0 | — | | 92 | 20 |
| Swansea City (loan) | 2020–21 | Championship | 2 | 0 | — | | 1 | 0 | — | | 3 | 0 |
| FC Dallas | 2022 | Major League Soccer | 32 | 10 | 2 | 0 | — | | — | | 34 | 10 |
| FC Dallas | 2023 | Major League Soccer | 22 | 2 | 3 | 1 | — | | 3 | 0 | 28 | 3 |
| FC Dallas | 2024 | Major League Soccer | 31 | 5 | 0 | 0 | 1 | 0 | 2 | 0 | 34 | 5 |
| FC Dallas | Total | | 85 | 17 | 5 | 1 | 1 | 0 | 5 | 0 | 96 | 18 |
| Seattle Sounders FC | 2025 | Major League Soccer | 2 | 0 | — | | — | | 4 | 2 | 6 | 2 |
| Career total | | | 258 | 41 | 10 | 1 | 23 | 3 | 14 | 4 | 305 | 49 |

=== International ===
As of match played January 28, 2023

Appearances and goals by national team and year
| National team | Year | Apps | Goals |
|---|---|---|---|
| United States | 2016 | 3 | 2 |
| United States | 2017 | 13 | 0 |
| United States | 2018 | 2 | 0 |
| United States | 2019 | 14 | 3 |
| United States | 2020 | 2 | 1 |
| United States | 2021 | 8 | 2 |
| United States | 2022 | 6 | 2 |
| United States | 2023 | 2 | 0 |
| Total | | 50 | 10 |

==== International goals ====
As of matches played June 10, 2022. United States score listed first, score column indicates score after each Arriola goal.

International goals by date, venue, cap, opponent, score, result and competition
| No. | Date | Venue | Cap | Opponent | Score | Result | Competition |
|---|---|---|---|---|---|---|---|
| 1 | May 22, 2016 | Juan Ramón Loubriel Stadium, Bayamón, Puerto Rico | 1 | Puerto Rico | 3–1 | 3–1 | Friendly |
| 2 | September 6, 2016 | EverBank Field, Jacksonville, United States | 2 | Trinidad and Tobago | 4–0 | 4–0 | 2018 FIFA World Cup qualification |
| 3 | February 2, 2019 | Avaya Stadium, San Jose, United States | 18 | Costa Rica | 2–0 | 2–0 | Friendly |
| 4 | June 18, 2019 | Allianz Field, St. Paul, United States | 25 | Guyana | 1–0 | 4–0 | 2019 CONCACAF Gold Cup |
| 5 | June 22, 2019 | FirstEnergy Stadium, Cleveland, United States | 26 | Trinidad and Tobago | 5–0 | 6–0 | 2019 CONCACAF Gold Cup |
| 6 | December 9, 2020 | Inter Miami CF Stadium, Fort Lauderdale, United States | 34 | El Salvador | 1–0 | 6–0 | Friendly |
| 7 | January 31, 2021 | Exploria Stadium, Orlando, United States | 35 | Trinidad and Tobago | 3–0 | 7–0 | Friendly |
| 8 | January 31, 2021 | Exploria Stadium, Orlando, United States | 35 | Trinidad and Tobago | 4–0 | 7–0 | Friendly |
| 9 | March 27, 2022 | Exploria Stadium, Orlando, United States | 44 | Panama | 2–0 | 5–1 | 2022 FIFA World Cup qualification |
| 10 | June 10, 2022 | Q2 Stadium, Austin, United States | 46 | Grenada | 4–0 | 5–0 | 2022–23 CONCACAF Nations League A |

== Honors ==
United States U17

- CONCACAF U-17 Championship: 2011

United States

- CONCACAF Gold Cup: 2017, 2021

Individual

- MLS All-Star: 2022
- MLS Player of the Month: May 2022
