= Ulises Segura =

Costa Rican football player (born 1993)

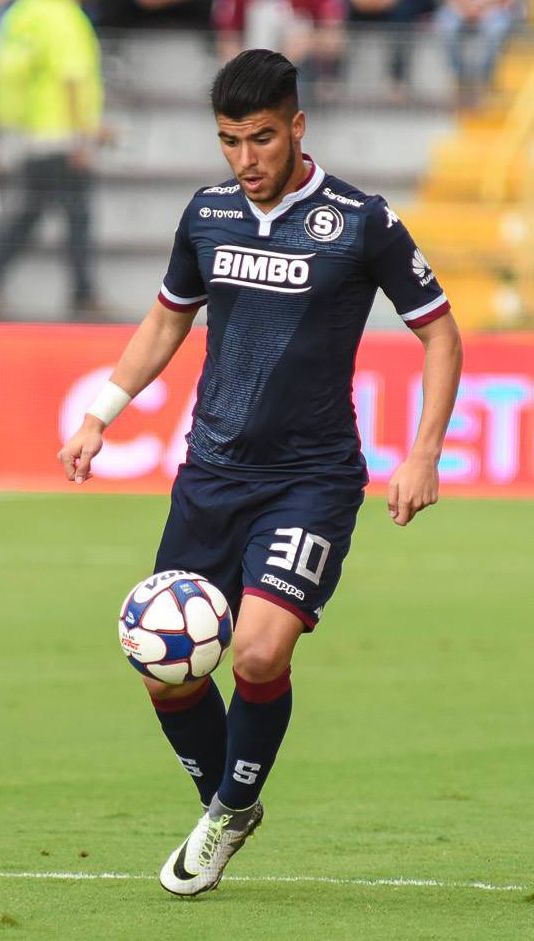
- Segura with Saprissa in 2016

Personal information
- Full name: Ulises Antonio Segura Machado
- Date of birth: 23 June 1993 (age 33)
- Place of birth: Guadalupe, Costa Rica
- Height: 1.83 m (6 ft 0 in)
- Position: Midfielder

Team information
- Current team: Puntarenas
- Number: 30

Senior career*
Years	Team	Apps	(Gls)
2012–2014	Generación Saprissa	25	(2)
2014–2017	Saprissa	115	(14)
2014–2015	→ Uruguay de Coronado (loan)	37	(3)
2018–2020	D.C. United	68	(5)
2021–2022	Austin FC	0	(0)
2022–2025	Saprissa	65	(3)
2025–	Puntarenas	17	(0)

International career^{‡}
2015	Costa Rica U23	6	(0)
2017–2020	Costa Rica	10	(0)
- * Club domestic league appearances and goals as of 13 May 2025 ‡ National team caps and goals as of 1 February 2020

Ulises Antonio Segura Machado (born 23 June 1993) is a Costa Rican professional footballer who plays as a midfielder for Liga FPD club Puntarenas and the Costa Rica national team.

== Career ==
=== Deportivo Saprissa ===
Including his first season with Deportivo Saprissa, Segura already won 3 titles with the club. Segura appeared 126 times for Saprissa and had 15 goals and 6 assists in his time there.

=== CS Uruguay de Coronado ===
Ulises Segura was on loan with Uruguay de Coronado from 2014 to 2015. He scored 3 goals and had 1 assist in his 39 appearances for them.

=== D.C. United ===
Segura was acquired by D.C. United on 21 December 2017. On 15 April 2018, Segura scored his first MLS career goal in a 1–0 win against Columbus Crew SC. Segura scored the goal inside 50 seconds making it the third-fastest goal scored in club history. He finished the 2018 season with 2 goals and one assist in 23 appearances.

In 2019, Segura appeared in 33 games, scored 3 goals and contributed two assists for D.C. United.

=== Austin FC ===
Segura was traded to Austin FC in exchange for $150,000 of General Allocation Money on 13 December 2020, ahead of their inaugural season in 2021. Prior to the start of the season, Segura suffered a left knee injury and underwent osteochondral allograft transplantation surgery, causing him to miss the entire 2021 season. On 25 January 2022, Austin FC announced that it would buyout the remaining portion of Segura's contract freeing up a senior roster spot.

=== International ===
Segura made his first senior international appearance in a Copa Centroamericana match against Belize on 15 January 2017, having played the entire match.

== Career statistics ==
=== Club ===
As of match played 13 September 2020

Appearances and goals by club, season and competition
Club	Season	League			National Cup		Continental		Other		Total	
Club	Season	Division	Apps	Goals	Apps	Goals	Apps	Goals	Apps	Goals	Apps	Goals
Deportivo Saprissa	2013–14	Primera División	2	0	—		—		—		2	0
Deportivo Saprissa	2015–16	Liga FPD	36	1	—		3 (Note: Appearance(s) in CONCACAF Champions League)	0	—		39	1
Deportivo Saprissa	2016–17	Liga FPD	51	8	—		6	1	—		57	9
Deportivo Saprissa	2017–18	Liga FPD	26	5	—		—		—		26	5
Deportivo Saprissa	Club Total		115	14	0	0	9	1	0	0	124	15
Uruguay de Coronado (loan)	2014–15	Primera División	37	3	—		—		—		37	3
Uruguay de Coronado (loan)	Club Total		37	3	0	0	0	0	0	0	37	3
D.C. United	2018	MLS	23	2	—		—		—		23	2
D.C. United	2019	MLS	33	3	2	0	—		1 (Note: Appearance(s) in MLS Cup Playoffs)	0	36	3
D.C. United	2020	MLS	10	0	—		—		—		10	0
D.C. United	Club Total		66	5	2	0	0	0	1	0	69	5
Austin FC	2021	MLS	0	0	—		—		—		0	0
Austin FC	2022	MLS	0	0	—		—		—		0	0
Austin FC	Club Total		0	0	0	0	0	0	0	0	0	0
Career total			218	22	2	0	9	1	1	0	230	23

=== International ===
As of match played 2 January 2020

Appearances and goals by national team and year
National team	Year	Apps	Goals
Costa Rica	2017	6	0
Costa Rica	2018	3	0
Costa Rica	2020	1	0
Total		10	0

== Personal life ==
Segura received his green card in January 2020.

== Honours ==
Saprissa

- Liga FPD: Clausura 2014, Apertura 2015, Apertura 2016
