= Yamil Asad =

Argentine association football player

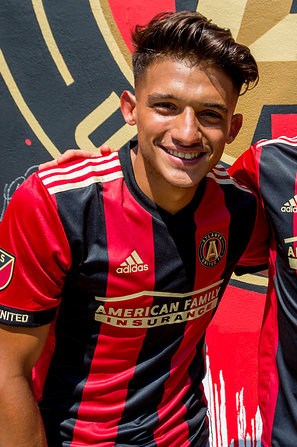
- Asad in 2017

Personal information
- Full name: Yamil Rodrigo Asad
- Date of birth: 27 July 1994 (age 32)
- Place of birth: San Antonio de Padua, Argentina
- Height: 1.77 m (5 ft 10 in)
- Position: Attacking midfielder

Team information
- Current team: Cuiabá
- Number: 7

Youth career
- Vélez Sarsfield

Senior career*
Years	Team	Apps	(Gls)
2013–2019	Vélez Sarsfield	55	(4)
2017	→ Atlanta United (loan)	32	(7)
2018	→ D.C. United (loan)	30	(9)
2020–2021	D.C. United	39	(5)
2022	Universidad Católica	12	(1)
2023	D.C. United	21	(0)
2024	FC Cincinnati	26	(4)
2024	FC Cincinnati 2	1	(0)
2025–	Cuiabá	12	(0)
- * Club domestic league appearances and goals as of 16 April 2026

Yamil Rodrigo Asad (born 27 July 1994) is an Argentine professional footballer who plays as an attacking midfielder for Cuiabá in the Campeonato Brasileiro Série B.

== Club career ==
=== Vélez Sarsfield ===
Asad played youth football and debuted professionally with Vélez Sarsfield under Ricardo Gareca's coaching, entering the field in a 1–2 defeat to Colón in the 2013 Final. Asad was part of the squad that won the 2013 Supercopa Argentina, although he did not play the game.

After Héctor Canteros' departure from the club and Jorge Correa's injury, Asad started playing more regularly for the first team under José Oscar Flores' coaching in the 2014 Argentine Primera División, totaling 14 games (5 as a starter). Under Miguel Ángel Russo's coaching, Asad scored his first professional goal, in a 2–1 victory over Crucero del Norte.

=== Atlanta United ===
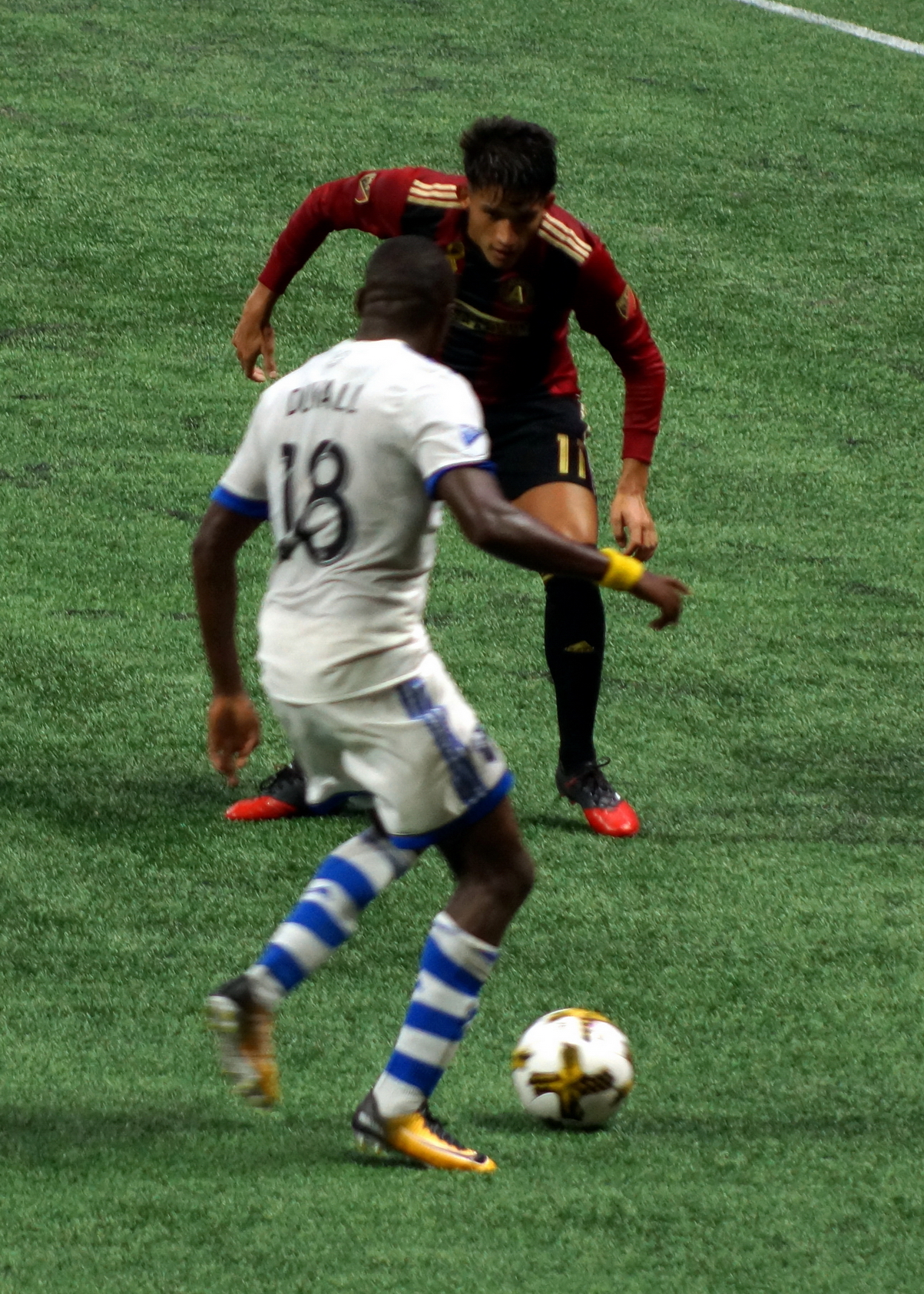
Asad playing for Atlanta United vs Montreal Impact on September 14, 2017.

On 11 January 2017, Asad was loaned to Major League Soccer's Atlanta United FC. He scored the first goal in the team's MLS history, against New York Red Bulls in a 1–2 defeat at home on 5 March 2017. Despite a successful season with Atlanta, the club was unable to agree terms with Vélez Sarsfield on a permanent move and Asad returned to the Argentine club. However, MLS roster rules dictated that Atlanta maintained his rights within MLS.

=== D.C. United ===
In February 2018, a three-way transaction was struck between Vélez Sarsfield, Atlanta United, and D.C. United which resulted in Asad signing on loan for D.C. In the deal, D.C. sent $300,000 in general allocation money and $200,000 in targeted allocation money to Atlanta for Asad's MLS future. At the same time, D.C. reached a loan agreement for 2018 with Vélez Sarsfield which included a purchase option of $700,000 at season's end. In his debut for D.C. United against Orlando City SC on March 3, 2018, Asad scored his first goal for the team in the 32nd minute. Asad scored again in the Audi Field inaugural game against the Vancouver Whitecaps on 14 July 2018. The game ended as a 3–1 win for United. Asad scored 9 goals and contributed 8 assists in 2018 for D.C. United.

D.C. United pursued to permanently sign Asad after the 2018 season, but talks fell and Asad decided to return to Vélez Sarsfield.

=== Return to Vélez Sarsfield ===
Asad decided to return to Vélez Sarsfield in January 2019.

=== Return to D.C. United ===
On 17 September 2019, Asad signed a pre-contract agreement with D.C. United for the 2020 Major League Soccer Season. Asad scored his first goal for D.C. United since his return on 7 March 2020, in a 2–1 win against Inter Miami. Following the 2021 season, Asad was released by D.C. United.

=== FC Cincinnati ===
On 28 March 2024, after several weeks of training with the club, Asad signed a contract with FC Cincinnati, guaranteed through 2024 with a club option for 2025.

== International career ==
Due to his background, he is available to play for either Argentina, Syria and Lebanon.

== Personal life ==
Yamil Asad is the son of former Vélez Sarsfield player Omar Asad, who scored the second goal for Vélez in the 2–0 win over A.C. Milan for the 1994 Intercontinental Cup, the same year of Yamil's birth. He is also great-nephew of former international footballer and manager Julio Asad. Asad was nicknamed "El Turco" due to his Syrian/Lebanese ethnicity.

== Career statistics ==
=== Club ===
As of match played 28 October 2024

Appearances and goals by club, season and competition
Club	Season	League			National Cup		League Cup		Continental		Other		Total	
Club	Season	Div.	Apps	Goals	Apps	Goals	Apps	Goals	Apps	Goals	Apps	Goals	Apps	Goals
Vélez Sarsfield	2012–13	A. Primera División	1	0	—		—		—		—		1	0
Vélez Sarsfield	2013–14	A. Primera División	5	0	5	0	—		—		—		10	0
Vélez Sarsfield	2014	A. Primera División	13	0	1	0	—		1 (Note: Appearance(s) in the Copa Libertadores)	0	—		15	0
Vélez Sarsfield	2015	A. Primera División	24	4	—		—		—		1 (Note: Appearance(s) in Copa Libertadores Playoffs)	0	25	4
Vélez Sarsfield	2016	A. Primera División	9	0	—		—		—		—		9	0
Vélez Sarsfield	2016–17	A. Primera División	2	0	—		—		—		—		2	0
Vélez Sarsfield	2018–19	A. Primera División	1	0	—		—		—		—		1	0
Vélez Sarsfield	Total		55	4	6	0	—		1	0	1	0	63	4
Atlanta United (loan)	2017	Major League Soccer	32	7	—		—		—		1 (Note: Appearance(s) in MLS Cup Playoffs)	0	33	7
D.C. United (loan)	2018	Major League Soccer	30	9	2	0	—		—		1 (Note: Appearance(s) in MLS Cup Playoffs)	0	33	9
D.C. United	2020	Major League Soccer	23	3	—		—		—		—		23	3
D.C. United	2021	Major League Soccer	16	2	—		—		—		—		16	2
D.C. United	Total		39	5	—		—		—		—		39	5
Universidad Católica	2022	C. Primera División	12	1	1	0	—		1	0	—		14	1
D.C. United	2023	Major League Soccer	21	0	2	1	3	0	—		—		26	1
FC Cincinnati	2024	Major League Soccer	23	3	—		3	2	—		3 (Note: Appearance(s) in MLS Cup Playoffs)	1	29	6
FC Cincinnati 2 (loan)	2024	MLS Next Pro	1	0	—		—		—		—		1	0
Career total			213	29	11	1	6	2	2	0	6	1	238	33

== Honours ==
Vélez Sarsfield

- Supercopa Argentina: 2013
