= Chris Odoi-Atsem =

American soccer player (born 1995)

Personal information
- Full name: Chris Odoi-Atsem
- Date of birth: May 28, 1995 (age 31)
- Place of birth: Mitchellville, Maryland, United States
- Height: 5 ft 10 in (1.78 m)
- Position: Defender

Team information
- Current team: Alexandria Reds

Youth career
- 2008–2013: Bethesda SC

College career
Years	Team	Apps	(Gls)
2013–2016	Maryland Terrapins	86	(3)

Senior career*
Years	Team	Apps	(Gls)
2017–2022	D.C. United	57	(1)
2017	→ Richmond Kickers (loan)	1	(0)
2019	→ Loudoun United (loan)	6	(0)
2023–	Alexandria Reds	1	(1)
- * Club domestic league appearances and goals

Chris Odoi-Atsem (born May 28, 1995) is an American soccer player who currently plays for National Premier Soccer League club Alexandria Reds.

== Early life ==
Chris Odoi-Atsem was born and raised in Mitchellville, Maryland and attended Holy Trinity Episcopal Day School and DeMatha Catholic High School. where he played youth soccer for AC Bethesda in the National Capital Soccer League and eventually in the U.S. Soccer Development Academy league. Odi-Atsem was a regular on the team from 2008 until 2013. Odoi-Atsem also played high school soccer for DeMatha Catholic High School, where he helped them win a state championship in 2011.

=== College soccer ===
During the 2013 NCAA Division I men's soccer season, Odoi-Atsem made his college soccer debut, coming on as a sub in 3–3 draw against Stanford in Palo Alto, California on August 30, 2013. On September 8, 2013, Odoi-Atsem scored his first collegiate goal in a 2–3 loss to VCU. He finished his freshman season making 25 appearances, and starting in 20 matches.

Odoi-Atsem earned his first conference honors during his sophomore year at Maryland. Following the end of the regular season, Odoi-Atsem earned First Team All-Big Ten Conference honors. Odoi-Atsem played in and started in all 21 games the Terrapins played during the 2014 season. During his junior year, Odoi-Atsem earned Second Team All-Big Ten Conference honors and made 20 appearances for the Terrapins. As a senior, he was part of a Maryland squad that spent most of the 2016 NCAA Division I men's soccer season ranked first nationally, earning both First Team All-Big Ten honors, and NSCAA First Team All-Midwest Region.

== Professional career ==
Odoi-Atsem was considered one of the top prospects in the 2017 MLS SuperDraft and was selected with the 12th overall pick by D.C. United. On April 30, 2017, Odoi-Atsem made his professional and MLS debut in a 3–1 away win at Atlanta United. Odoi-Atsem came on in the 90th minute for Lloyd Sam and played the final five minutes of stoppage time. On November 28, 2017, his contract option with United was declined. D.C. United re-signed Odoi-Atsem on February 16, 2018.

He returned to the field after his battle with cancer on 29 May 2019, playing 67 minutes in a game against Chicago Fire. Odoi-Astem played with D.C. United's USL affiliate, Loudoun United in 2019.

Odoi-Atsem scored his first goal for D.C. United on October 18, 2020, in a 2–1 win over FC Cincinnati. On January 27, 2021, D.C. United re-signed Odoi-Atsem to a two-year contract with a 2023 option.

Following the 2022 season, his contract option was declined by D.C. United.

In July 2023, Odoi-Atsem made an appearance for National Premier Soccer League side Alexandria Reds. He came on as a 59th-minute substitute and scored the game-winning goal in a 2–1 win away to Annapolis Blues.

== Personal life ==
Odoi-Atsem is of Ghanaian descent through his parents.

In October 2018, Odoi-Atsem was diagnosed with Stage 2 Hodgkin's Lymphoma, effectively ending his 2018 season with D.C. United as he began a chemotherapy regimen at MedStar Georgetown University Hospital. He completed his cancer treatment in January 2019.
