= 2022 D.C. United season =

D.C. United 2022 soccer season

D.C. United
2022 season
- General manager: Lucy Rushton
- Head coach: Hernán Losada (until April 21); Chad Ashton (Interim) (April 22 – July 30); Wayne Rooney (from July 31)
- Stadium: Audi Field
- MLS: Conference: 14th Overall: 28th
- MLS Cup Playoffs: Did not qualify
- U.S. Open Cup: Fourth round
- Top goalscorer: League: Taxiarchis Fountas (12); All: Taxiarchis Fountas (12)
- Highest home attendance: 19,325 (vs FC Cincinnati, October 9, MLS)
- Lowest home attendance: 10,128 (vs Columbus Crew, July 13, MLS)
- Average home league attendance: 16,256
- Biggest win: 3–0, twice
- Biggest defeat: 0–7 (vs Philadelphia (A), July 8, MLS)
Home colors	Away colors

The 2022 season was D.C. United's 27th in existence and their 27th consecutive season in the top division of American soccer, Major League Soccer. In addition to MLS, D.C. United participated in this season's editions of the U.S. Open Cup. United also participated in the Coachella Valley Invitational and the Capital Cup friendly tournaments. The season covered the period from 1 December 2021 to 30 November 2022.

During this season, United had a poor run of form, finishing in last place for the fourth time in franchise history, the third time with Dave Kasper as General Manager or President, and the second time with Jason Levien as owner. During the season, United broke their club record for the most goals conceded during a season (75), largest home loss (6 goals), and largest away loss (7 goals).

During the season, there were several notable departures from United including Paul Arriola, Julian Gressel, Kevin Paredes, and Frédéric Brillant. The club brought in David Ochoa, Christian Benteke, Taxiarchis Fountas, and Martín Rodríguez.

== Club ==
=== Team management ===
Position	Name
Chairman	(United States) Jason Levien
Co-Chairman	(United States) Stephen Kaplan
President of Soccer Operations	(United States) Dave Kasper
General Manager	(England) Lucy Rushton
Technical Director	(England) Stewart Mairs
Head coach	(England) Wayne Rooney
Assistant coach	(United States) Chad Ashton
Assistant coach	(Argentina) Nicolás Frutos
Assistant coach	(France) Frédéric Brillant
Assistant coach	(England) Pete Shuttleworth
Goalkeeping coach	(United States) Diego Restrepo

=== Roster ===
As of August 5, 2022

Squad No.	Name	Nationality	Position(s)	Date of birth (age)	Apps	Goals	Assists	Signed from
Goalkeepers
1	Rafael Romo	(Venezuela)	GK	February 25, 1990 (age 36)	15	0	0	(Belgium) OH Leuven
21	Jon Kempin	(United States)	GK	April 8, 1993 (age 33)	13	0	0	(United States) Columbus Crew
24	Bill Hamid	(United States)	GK	November 25, 1990 (age 35)	297	0	0	(Denmark) Midtjylland
32	David Ochoa	(Mexico)	GK	January 16, 2001 (age 25)	9	0	0	(United States) Real Salt Lake
Defenders
2	Gaoussou Samaké	(Ivory Coast)	LB	November 4, 1997 (age 28)	4	0	0	(Ivory Coast) ASEC Mimosas
3	Chris Odoi-Atsem	(United States)	RB	May 27, 1995 (age 30)	59	1	0	(United States) Maryland Terrapins
4	Brendan Hines-Ike	(United States)	CB	November 30, 1994 (age 31)	33	1	0	(Belgium) Kortrijk
5	Brad Smith	(Australia)	LB	April 9, 1994 (age 32)	16	0	1	(United States) Seattle Sounders FC
14	Andy Najar	(Honduras)	RB	March 16, 1993 (age 33)	136	11	15	(United States) Los Angeles FC
15	Steve Birnbaum	(United States)	CB	January 23, 1991 (age 35)	247	13	6	(United States) California Golden Bears
23	Donovan Pines	(United States)	CB	March 7, 1998 (age 28)	67	3	1	(United States) Maryland Terrapins
33	Jacob Greene	(United States)	LB / RB	March 23, 2003 (age 23)	1	0	0	(United States) D.C. United Academy
45	Matai Akinmboni	(United States)	CB	October 17, 2006 (age 19)	2	0	0	(United States) D.C. United Academy
93	Tony Alfaro	(Mexico)	CB	June 15, 1993 (age 32)	45	1	2	(United States) Reno 1868
97	Sami Guediri	(United States)	LB	August 18, 1997 (age 28)	14	0	0	(United States) Loudoun United
Midfielders
6	Russell Canouse	(United States)	DM	June 11, 1995 (age 30)	113	5	5	(Germany) Hoffenheim
8	Chris Durkin	(United States)	DM	February 8, 2000 (age 26)	71	2	4	(Belgium) Sint-Truiden
12	Drew Skundrich	(United States)	CM	September 17, 1995 (age 30)	41	0	2	(United States) Loudoun United
13	Sofiane Djeffal	(France)	MF	April 19, 1999 (age 27)	28	0	1	(United States) Oregon State Beavers
18	Jeremy Garay	(El Salvador)	MF	April 1, 2003 (age 23)	1	0	0	(United States) D.C. United Academy
25	Jackson Hopkins	(United States)	AM / SS	July 1, 2004 (age 21)	22	0	1	(United States) D.C. United Academy
35	Ted Ku-DiPietro	(United States)	MF	January 28, 2002 (age 24)	12	0	0	(United States) Loudoun United
44	Victor Pálsson	(Iceland)	DM	April 30, 1991 (age 35)	10	0	0	(Germany) Schalke 04
49	Ravel Morrison	(Jamaica)	MF	February 2, 1993 (age 33)	14	2	0	(England) Derby County
77	Martín Rodríguez	(Chile)	MF / LW	August 5, 1994 (age 31)	14	0	1	(Turkey) Altay SK
Forwards
9	Ola Kamara	(Norway)	ST	October 15, 1989 (age 36)	87	37	6	(China) Shenzhen
11	Taxiarchis Fountas	(Greece)	SS	September 4, 1995 (age 30)	21	12	1	(Austria) Rapid Wien
16	Adrien Perez	(United States)	FW	October 13, 1995 (age 30)	19	0	2	(United States) Los Angeles FC
17	Kimarni Smith	(England)	LW	March 14, 1998 (age 28)	22	1	1	(United States) Clemson Tigers
19	Nigel Robertha	(Curaçao)	FW	March 13, 1998 (age 28)	36	6	4	(Bulgaria) Levski Sofia
20	Christian Benteke	(Belgium)	ST	December 3, 1990 (age 35)	7	1	0	(England) Crystal Palace
22	Miguel Berry	(Spain)	ST	September 16, 1997 (age 28)	14	0	0	(United States) Columbus Crew

== Non-competitive ==
=== Preseason exhibitions ===
January 29	Inter Miami CF	0–1	D.C. United	Fort Lauderdale, FL
17:00 EST			Hopkins 58'	Stadium: DRV PNK Stadium; Attendance: Closed-door

February 19	LA Galaxy	2–2	D.C. United	Carson, CA
18:00 EST	Chicharito 26', 74'; Cabral (yellow card) 42'		Birnbaum 14'; Estrada 58'; Liadi (yellow card) 77'	Stadium: Dignity Health Sports Park

==== Coachella Valley Invitational ====
February 10	New York Red Bulls	1–1	D.C. United	Indio, CA
19:00 EST	Barlow 65'	NYRB Tweet; DCU Tweet	Flores 27'	Stadium: Empire Polo Club; Attendance: 0

February 15	Los Angeles FC	0–2	D.C. United	Indio, CA
19:00 EST		Report	9' (pen.); Skundrich 77'	Stadium: Empire Polo Club; Attendance: 0

=== Midseason exhibitions ===
June 1	D.C. United	1–1	Águila	Washington, DC
19:30 EST	Guediri 82'			Stadium: Audi Field

June 7	D.C. United	1–0	Xelajú	Washington, DC
19:30 EST	Houssou (yellow card) 13'; Hope-Gund 16'			Stadium: Audi Field

July 20	D.C. United	2–6	Bayern Munich	Washington, DC
	Pines (yellow card) 38'; Simonsen 54'; Durkin (yellow card) 55'; Djeffal (yellow card) 74'; Ku-DiPietro 83'	Report	Mané 5' (pen.); Sabitzer 12'; Gnabry 44'; De Ligt 47', (yellow card) 71'; Zirkzee 51'; Müller 90+2'	Stadium: Audi Field; Attendance: 20,000; Referee: Matthew Franz

== Competitive ==
=== Major League Soccer ===
==== Standings ====
Pos	Team	Pld	W	L	T	GF	GA	GD	Pts
10	New England Revolution	34	10	12	12	47	50	−3	42
11	Atlanta United FC	34	10	14	10	48	54	−6	40
12	Chicago Fire FC	34	10	15	9	39	48	−9	39
13	Toronto FC (Note: Canadian clubs cannot qualify for the 2023 CONCACAF Champions League through the MLS regular season or playoffs.)	34	9	18	7	49	66	−17	34
14	D.C. United	34	7	21	6	36	71	−35	27

Source: MLS
Rules for classification: 1) points; 2) total wins; 3) total goal differential; 4) total goals scored; 5) fewer disciplinary points; 6) away goal differential; 7) away goals scored; 8) home goals differential; 9) home goals scored; 10) coin toss (2 clubs tied) or drawing of lots (≥3 clubs tied)

==== Results summary ====
Overall								Home						Away					
Pld	W	D	L	GF	GA	GD	Pts	W	D	L	GF	GA	GD	W	D	L	GF	GA	GD
34	7	6	21	23	37	−14	27	4	4	9	13	15	−2	3	2	12	10	22	−12

Last updated: July 12, 2022.
Source: MLS

==== Results by matchday ====
Game Week	1	2	3	4	5	6	7
Stadium	H	A	H	A	H	H	H
Result	W	W	L	L	L	L	W
Position (Conf.)	2	2	4	7	11	14	9
Position (Ovr.)	3	3	7	13	20	25	18

Updated to match(es) played on March 2022. Source: MLS
A = Away; H = Home; W = Win; D = Draw; L = Loss; P = Postponed
Notes: Positions show the situation at the end of the corresponding Game Weeks (GW); not the position at the conclusion of matches or game days

==== Results ====
February 26 1	D.C. United	3–0	Charlotte FC	Washington, DC
18:00 EST	Najar (yellow card) 15'; Estrada 37' (pen.), 45+6'; Kamara 65'; Hines-Ike (yellow card) 85'; Perez (yellow card) 87'	Report	Ortiz (yellow card) 27'	Stadium: Audi Field; Attendance: 16,412; Referee: Victor Rivas

March 5 2	FC Cincinnati	0–1	D.C. United	Cincinnati, OH
18:00 EST	Blackett (yellow card) 90+4'	Report	Nyeman (red card) 80'; B. Smith (yellow card) 90+1'; Kamara 90+8' (pen.)	Stadium: TQL Stadium; Attendance: 22,183; Referee: Pierre-Luc Lauziere

March 12 3	D.C. United	0–2	Chicago Fire FC	Washington, DC
19:30 EST	Najar (yellow card) 21'; Skundrich (yellow card) 45'; Hines-Ike (yellow card) 65'	Report	Ivanov 32'; Giménez (yellow card) 45'; Sekulic (yellow card) 48'; Bornstein 80'; Navarro (yellow card) 86'	Stadium: Audi Field; Attendance: 13,795; Referee: Rubiel Vazquez

March 19 4	Toronto FC	2–1	D.C. United	Toronto, ON
15:00 EDT	Pozuelo 24' (yellow card) 47'; Osorio 53' (yellow card) 55'; O'Neill (yellow card) 77'; MacNaughton (yellow card) 82'	Report	Canouse 10'; Flores (yellow card) 49'; Najar (yellow card) 72'; Yow (yellow card) 83'	Stadium: BMO Field; Attendance: 21,501; Referee: Ramy Touchan

April 2 5	D.C. United	0–1	Atlanta United FC	Washington, DC
19:30 EDT	Canouse (yellow card) 34'; Djeffal (yellow card) 38'	Report	Campbell (yellow card) 33'; Conway (yellow card) 81'; Almada (yellow card) 89'; Moreno 90+4'	Stadium: Audi Field; Attendance: 17,289; Referee: Armando Villarreal

April 16 6	D.C. United	2–3	Austin FC	Washington, DC
19:30 EDT	Kamara 26' 40' (yellow card) 27' (yellow-red card) 45+7'; Robertha (yellow card) 41'; Hopkins (yellow card) 73'; Gressel (yellow card) 78'; Samaké (yellow card) 87'	Report	Ring (yellow card) 35'; Cascante (yellow card) 60'; Pereira (yellow card) 70'; Hoesen 80'; Driussi 85'; Gabrielsen 90'	Stadium: Audi Field; Attendance: 16,840; Referee: Tori Penso

April 23 7	D.C. United	3–2	New England Revolution	Washington, DC
19:30 EDT	Fountas 26', 43'; Gressel (yellow card) 33'; Estrada 39'	Report	Bye 6'; Jones (yellow card) 65'; Buksa 86' (yellow card) 87'; Kessler (yellow card) 89'	Stadium: Audi Field; Attendance: 17,131; Referee: Marcos de Oliveira

April 30 8	Columbus Crew	3–0	D.C. United	Columbus, OH
19:30 EDT	Santos 28'; Etienne 43'; Nagbe 75'	Report	Hines-Ike (yellow card) 36'; Birnbaum (yellow card) 45+1'	Stadium: Lower.com Field; Attendance: 19,402; Referee: Timothy Ford

May 7 9	D.C. United	2–0	Houston Dynamo FC	Washington, DC
19:30 EDT	Fountas 35', 43'; Canouse (yellow card) 55'; Durkin (yellow card) 90+3'	Report	Quintero (yellow card) 45+4'; Carrasquilla (yellow card) 87'; Rodríguez (yellow card) 90+3'	Stadium: Audi Field; Attendance: 15,194; Referee: Jon Freemon

May 14 10	Inter Miami CF	2–2	D.C. United	Fort Lauderdale, FL
5:00 p.m. EDT				Stadium: DRV PNK Stadium

May 18 11	D.C. United	0–2	New York City FC	Washington, DC
4:30 p.m. EDT	Romo (yellow card) 19'	Report	Callens 6'; Rodríguez (yellow card) 36'; Castellanos 45+5' (pen.) (yellow card) 63'; Zelalem (yellow card) 90+4'	Stadium: Audi Field; Attendance: 16,072; Referee: Chris Penso

May 21 12	D.C. United	2–2	Toronto FC	Washington, DC
1:00 p.m. EDT	Flores 7'; Hines-Ike (yellow card) 16'; Alfaro (yellow card) 23'; Estrada 56'; Smith (yellow card) 84'; Durkin (yellow card) 90+3'	Report	Salcedo (yellow card) 10'; Akinola 36'; Jiménez (yellow card) 45+1'; Osorio (yellow card) 80' (goal) 89'	Stadium: Audi Field; Attendance: 18,320; Referee: Ismir Pekmic

May 28 13	New York Red Bulls	4–1	D.C. United	Harrison, NJ
4:00 p.m. EDT	Klimala (yellow card) 50'; Luquinhas 54', 58'; Morgan 63'; Fernandez (yellow card) 78'; Afaro 90' (o.g.)	Report	Hines-Ike (yellow card) 27'; Djeffal (yellow card) 42'; Kamara 87'	Stadium: Red Bull Arena; Attendance: 13,678; Referee: Allen Chapman

June 18 14	Chicago Fire	1–0	D.C. United	Chicago, IL
5:00 p.m. EDT	F. Navarro (yellow card) 30'; Herbers 78', (yellow card) 87'	Report	Pines (yellow card) 33'; Najar (yellow card) 72'	Stadium: Soldier Field; Attendance: 17,650; Referee: Nima Saghafi

June 25 15	D.C. United	1–3	Nashville SC	Washington, DC
2:00 p.m. EDT	Najar (yellow card) 21'; Fountas 59'; Birnbaum (yellow card) 63'	Report	Lovitz 6' (yellow card) 26'; Mukhtar 45+1' 50'; Zimmerman (yellow card) 54'; Romney (yellow card) 60'; Anunga (yellow card) 84'; Haakenson (yellow card) 90+2'	Stadium: Audi Field; Attendance: 19,325; Referee: Lukasz Szpala

July 4 16	Orlando City SC	3–5	D.C. United	Orlando, FL
4:00 p.m. EDT	Schlegel (yellow card) 50'; Torres 57'; Kara 66'; Silva 80' (pen.)	Report	Fountas 5' 8' 51'; Smith 74'; Robertha (yellow card) 89' (goal) 90+6'	Stadium: Exploria Stadium; Attendance: 16; Referee: Allen Chapman

July 8 17	Philadelphia Union	7–0	D.C. United	Chester, PA
4:30 p.m. EDT	Bedoya 9', 37'; Carranza 22', 25', 72'; Uhre 45+2', 59'	Report	Birnbaum (yellow card) 36'; Odoi-Atsem (yellow card) 69'	Stadium: Subaru Park; Attendance: 19,007; Referee: Ted Unkel

July 13 18	D.C. United	2–2	Columbus Crew	Washington, DC
5:00 p.m. EDT	Odoi-Atsem (yellow card) 22'; Skundrich (yellow card) 45+3'; Fountas 80'; Kamara 90+2'	Report	Hernández 62', 81'; Room (yellow card) 72'; Pedro Santos (yellow card) 75'	Stadium: Audi Field; Attendance: 10,128; Referee: Rosendo Mendoza

July 16 19	Minnesota United FC	2–0	D.C. United	Saint Paul, MN
5:00 p.m. EDT	Reynoso 13' 50'	Report	Guediri (yellow card) 79'	Stadium: Allianz Field; Attendance: 19,718; Referee: Jair Marrufo

July 23 20	D.C. United	1–2	CF Montréal	Washington, DC
5:00 p.m. EDT	Hopkins (yellow card) 45+4'; Odoi-Atsem (yellow card) 49'; Birnbaum 56', (yellow card) 81'	Report	Quioto 1', 35'; Corbo (yellow card) 5'; Johnston (yellow card) 55'	Stadium: Audi Field; Attendance: 15,734; Referee: Rubiel Vazquez

July 31 21	D.C. United	2–1	Orlando City	Washington, DC
5:00 p.m. EDT	Djeffal (yellow card) 8'; Durkin 90+1'; Fountas 90+5'	Report	Urso 9'; Moutinho (yellow card) 69'; Michel (yellow card) 88'	Stadium: Audi Field; Attendance: 15,805; Referee: Armando Villarreal

August 3 22	Charlotte FC	3–0	D.C. United	Charlotte, NC
4:00 p.m. EDT	Birnbaum 13' (o.g.); Swiderski 64'; McNeill 67'	Report	Canouse (yellow card) 27'	Stadium: Bank of America Stadium; Attendance: 31,520; Referee: Guido Gonzales Jr.

August 6 23	D.C. United	0–0	New York Red Bulls	Washington, DC
4:30 p.m. EDT	Fountas (yellow card) 58'	Report	S. Nealis (yellow card) 90+2'	Stadium: Audi Field; Attendance: 16,258; Referee: Pierre-Luc Lauziere

August 13 24	New England Revolution	1–0	D.C. United	Foxborough, MA
4:30 p.m. EDT	Gil 18'	Report	Pálsson (yellow card) 81'; Hopkins (yellow card) 84'	Stadium: Gillette Stadium; Attendance: 24,240; Referee: Malik Badawi

August 16 25	Los Angeles FC	1–0	D.C. United	Los Angeles, CA
7:30 p.m. EDT	Opoku 67'; Escobar (yellow card) 89'	Report	Hopkins (yellow card) 28'; Najar (yellow card) 43'; Morrison (yellow card) 44'; Birnbaum (yellow card) 50' (yellow-red card) 60'; Ochoa (yellow card) 59'	Stadium: Banc of California Stadium; Attendance: 22,063; Referee: Ramy Touchan

August 20 26	D.C. United	0–6	Philadelphia Union	Washington, DC
4:30 p.m. EDT		Report	Uhre 37'; Gazdag 45+2' (pen.); Carranza 47', 70', 74'; Burke 79'	Stadium: Audi Field; Attendance: 17,941; Referee: Ted Unkel

August 28 27	Atlanta United	3–2	D.C. United	Atlanta, GA
1:00 p.m. EDT	Purata (yellow card) 18' (goal) 70'; Franco 49'; Martínez 62'	Report	Morrison 47'; Kamara 55'	Stadium: Mercedes-Benz Stadium; Attendance: 42,561; Referee: Nima Saghafi

August 31 28	New York City FC	1–2	D.C. United	Harrison, NJ
20:00 EDT	Héber 27'; Acevedo (yellow card) 56'; Amundsen (yellow card) 62'; Latinovich (yellow card) 69'	Report	Odoi-Atsem (yellow card) 22'; Kamara 24'; Rodríguez (yellow card) 25'; Birnbaum 57'; Fletcher (yellow card) 90+3'	Stadium: Red Bull Arena; Attendance: 8,113; Referee: Ismir Pekmic
Note: The match was originally scheduled for April 9 with the originally venue at Citi Field which was rescheduled to August 29 in order to allow NYCFC to prepare for the CONCACAF Champions League semifinals. The venue was also switched over to Red Bull Arena as it was the only venue available at the time.

September 4 29	D.C. United	0–0	Colorado Rapids	Washington, DC
19:30 EDT	Birnbaum (yellow card) 57'	Report	Zardes (yellow card) 74'; Rubio (yellow card) 84'; Beitashour (yellow card) 90+5'	Stadium: Audi Field; Attendance: 16,502; Referee: Tori Penso

September 10 30	Real Salt Lake	0–0	D.C. United	Sandy, UT
TBD EDT	Silva (yellow card) 66'; Herrera (yellow card) 89'	Report	Durkin (yellow card) 27'; Akinmboni (yellow card) 40'; Ochoa (yellow card) 61'	Stadium: Rio Tinto Stadium; Attendance: 20,487; Referee: Kevin Broadley

September 13 31	Sporting Kansas City	3–0	D.C. United	Kansas City, KS
TBD EDT	Espinoza (yellow card) 29'; Shelton 34'; Voloder 70'; Sallói 87'	Report	Morrison (yellow card) 31'; Benteke (yellow card) 63'; Smith (yellow card) 73'	Stadium: Children's Mercy Park; Attendance: 15,106; Referee: Rosendo Mendoza

September 18 32	D.C. United	2–3	Inter Miami	Washington, DC
2:00 p.m. EDT	Benteke 22'; Durkin (yellow card) 43'; Fountas 58' (yellow card) 62'	Report	Campana 39', 53'; Lowe (yellow card) 62'; Gregore (yellow card) 68'; Higuaín 90+4'; Vassilev (yellow card) 90+9'	Stadium: Audi Field; Attendance: 14,284; Referee: Ismail Elfath

October 1 33	CF Montréal	1–0	D.C. United	Montréal, QC
4:30 p.m. EDT	Pines 41' (o.g.)	Report	Hopkins (yellow card) 51'; Pines (red card) 79'; Benteke (yellow card) 90+4'	Stadium: Stade Saputo; Attendance: 19,619; Referee: Ramy Touchan

October 9 34	D.C. United	2–5	FC Cincinnati	Washington, DC
TBD EDT	Morrison 26'; Birnbaum (yellow card) 45+2'; Fletcher 47'	Report	Acosta 6'; Brenner 8', 24', 37'; Vazquez 53'; Barreal (yellow card) 61'	Stadium: Audi Field; Attendance: 19,325; Referee: Timothy Ford

=== U.S. Open Cup ===
April 19 Third round	Flower City Union (NISA) (New York (state))	0–3	(Washington, D.C.) D.C. United (MLS)	Rochester, NY
19:30 EDT	Ortega (yellow card) 85'	Report	Kamara 73', 86' (pen.); Robertha 81'	Stadium: Marina Auto Stadium; Attendance: 556; Referee: Luis Arroyo

May 10 Fourth round	D.C. United (MLS) (Washington, D.C.)	0–3	(New Jersey) New York Red Bulls (MLS)	Washington, DC
19:30 EDT	Smith (yellow card) 42'; Alfaro (yellow card) 46'; Skundrich (yellow card) 77'	Report	Luquinhas 45+3'; Tolkin 48'; Yearwood (yellow card) 58'; Ryan 68'; Pendant (yellow card) 74'; Harper (yellow card) 76'	Stadium: Audi Field; Attendance: 8,920; Referee: Matthew Franz

== Transfers ==
=== Transfers in ===
Date	Position	No.	Name	From	Fee/notes	Ref.
November 22, 2021	DF	2	(Ivory Coast) Gaoussou Samaké	(Ivory Coast) ASEC Mimosas	Signed through 2023, team options for 2024-25	
January 4, 2022	MF	4	(United States) Brendan Hines-Ike	(Belgium) Kortrijk	Loan option exercised	
January 13, 2022	MF	35	(United States) Ted Ku-DiPietro	(United States) Loudoun United	Homegrown contract through 2023, team options for 2024-2025	
January 24, 2022	DF	20	(United States) Hayden Sargis	(United States) Sacramento Republic	Signed through 2024, team options for 2025-26 $25,000 to Sacramento, plus bonuses at certain benchmarks.	
January 27, 2022	DF	5	(Australia) Brad Smith	(United States) Seattle Sounders FC	$750,000 GAM, with 10% sell-on fee	
January 27, 2022	FW	11	(Greece) Taxiarchis Fountas	(Austria) Rapid Wien	Designated Player through 2024 with club option for 2025.	
February 25, 2022	MF	13	(France) Sofiane Djeffal	(United States) Oregon State Beavers	MLS SuperDraft Pick	
March 24, 2022	MF	8	(United States) Chris Durkin	(Belgium) Sint-Truiden	$600,000 fee to Sint-Truiden, $200,000 GAM to Houston Dynamo for MLS rights	
April 13, 2022	MF	25	(United States) Jackson Hopkins	(United States) D.C. United Academy	Homegrown Player	
April 27, 2022	GK	1	(Venezuela) Rafael Romo	(Belgium) OH Leuven		
June 23, 2022	MF	77	(Chile) Martín Rodríguez	(Turkey) Altay SK	Signed through 2024, team option for 2025	
July 13, 2022	DF	97	(United States) Sami Guediri	(United States) Loudoun United		
July 20, 2022	FW	22	(Spain) Miguel Berry	(United States) Columbus Crew		
July 21, 2022	MF	49	(Jamaica) Ravel Morrison	(England) Derby County	Signed through 2023, with 2024 team option	
July 21, 2022	MF	44	(Iceland) Victor Pálsson	(Germany) Schalke 04	Designated Player, signed through 2024, club option for 2025	
July 29, 2022	GK	32	(Mexico) David Ochoa	(United States) Real Salt Lake	$75,000 GAM, plus up to $300,000 GAM in 2023; 25% sell-on fee for transfer outside MLS; Homegrown Player	
August 5, 2022	FW	20	(Belgium) Christian Benteke	(England) Crystal Palace	Designated Player, signed through 2024, club option for 2025	
August 30, 2022	FW	26	(United States) Kristian Fletcher	(United States) Loudoun United	Precontract (effective January 1, 2023) through 2025, club option for 2026; Homegrown Player	
August 31, 2022	DF	45	(United States) Matai Akinmboni	(United States) D.C. United Academy	Homegrown Player, signed through 2025, club options for 2026-27	

=== Transfers out ===
Date	Position	No.	Name	To	Fee/notes	Ref.
November 29, 2021	FW	32	(Argentina) Ramón Ábila	(Argentina) Boca Juniors	End of loan	
November 29, 2021	FW	20	(Venezuela) Jovanny Bolívar	(Venezuela) Deportivo La Guaira	End of loan	
November 29, 2021	MF	11	(Argentina) Yamil Asad	(Chile) Universidad Católica	Option declined	
November 29, 2021	FW	29	(Peru) Yordy Reyna	(United States) Charlotte FC	Option declined	
November 29, 2021	DF	28	(Costa Rica) Joseph Mora	(United States) Charlotte FC	Option declined, selected in 2021 MLS Expansion Draft	
November 29, 2021	DF	35	(United States) Michael DeShields	(United States) New England Revolution II	Option declined	
November 29, 2021	GK	1	(United States) Chris Seitz	N/A	Option declined, retired	
November 29, 2021	MF	18	(Brazil) Felipe	(United States) Austin FC	End of contract	
November 29, 2021	DF	13	(France) Frédéric Brillant	N/A	End of contract, retired	
January 8, 2022	FW	50	(Estonia) Erik Sorga	(Sweden) IFK Göteborg	€450,000	
January 26, 2022	MF	7	(United States) Paul Arriola	(United States) FC Dallas	$2,000,000 GAM	
January 28, 2022	DF	30	(United States) Kevin Paredes	(Germany) Wolfsburg	$7,350,000	
February 22, 2022	MF	5	(Venezuela) Júnior Moreno	(United States) FC Cincinnati	$250,000 GAM, plus up to $175,000 GAM if benchmarks are hit	
June 23, 2022	FW	10	(Peru) Edison Flores	(Mexico) Atlas	Undisclosed	
July 4, 2022	FW	22	(United States) Griffin Yow	(Belgium) Westerlo	$100,000, 35% sell-on fee and additional cash	
July 15, 2022	MF	31	(Germany) Julian Gressel	(Canada) Vancouver Whitecaps FC	$400,000 GAM (up to $900,000 through 2024)	
August 29, 2022	MF	27	(United States) Moses Nyeman	(Belgium) Beveren	$350,000, 25% sell-on fee	

=== Loan in ===
No.	Pos.	Player	Loaned from	Start	End	Source
7	FW	(Ecuador) Michael Estrada	(Mexico) Deportivo Toluca	February 8, 2022	August 11, 2022	
24	MF	(United States) Azaad Liadi	(United States) Loudoun United	February 26, 2022	March 2, 2022	

=== Loan out ===
No.	Pos.	Player	Loaned to	Start	End	Source
21	GK	(United States) Jon Kempin	(United States) San Diego Loyal	June 10, 2022	June 17, 2022	
30	DF	(United States) Hayden Sargis	(United States) Phoenix Rising FC	September 8, 2022	December 31, 2022	

=== MLS SuperDraft picks ===
2022 D.C. United SuperDraft Picks
Round	Selection	Player	Position	College	Status
2	36	(France) Sofiane Djeffal	MF	Oregon State	Signed to First Team roster
2	41	(United States) Alex Nagy	FW	Vermont	Returned to school
3	69	(Norway) Skage Simonsen	MF	SMU	Signed with Loudoun United FC

== Statistics ==
=== Appearances and goals ===
Numbers after plus-sign(+) denote appearances as a substitute.

No.	Pos	Nat	Player	Total		MLS		U.S. Open Cup		MLS Cup	
No.	Pos	Nat	Player	Apps	Goals	Apps	Goals	Apps	Goals	Apps	Goals
1	GK	(Venezuela) VEN	Rafael Romo	15	0	13+1	0	1+0	0	0+0	0
2	DF	(Ivory Coast) CIV	Gaoussou Samaké	4	0	1+2	0	1+0	0	0+0	0
3	DF	(United States) USA	Chris Odoi-Atsem	20	0	8+12	0	0	0	0+0	0
4	DF	(United States) USA	Brendan Hines-Ike	20	0	20+0	0	0	0	0+0	0
5	DF	(Australia) AUS	Brad Smith	16	0	14+2	0	0	0	0+0	0
6	MF	(United States) USA	Russell Canouse	18	1	14+4	1	0	0	0+0	0
8	MF	(United States) USA	Chris Durkin	30	1	24+5	1	1+0	0	0+0	0
9	FW	(Norway) NOR	Ola Kamara	31	11	15+15	9	1+0	2	0+0	0
11	MF	(Greece) GRE	Taxiarchis Fountas	21	12	17+4	12	0	0	0+0	0
12	MF	(United States) USA	Drew Skundrich	21	0	9+10	0	2+0	0	0+0	0
13	MF	(France) FRA	Sofiane Djeffal	28	0	19+9	0	0	0	0+0	0
14	DF	(Honduras) HON	Andy Najar	23	0	20+3	0	0	0	0+0	0
15	DF	(United States) USA	Steve Birnbaum	32	2	32+0	2	0	0	0+0	0
16	FW	(United States) USA	Adrien Perez	3	0	1+2	0	0	0	0+0	0
17	FW	(England) ENG	Kimarni Smith	19	1	2+15	1	1+1	0	0+0	0
18	MF	(El Salvador) SLV	Jeremy Garay	1	0	0	0	0+1	0	0+0	0
19	FW	(Curaçao) CUW	Nigel Robertha	18	2	5+12	1	0+1	1	0+0	0
20	FW	(Belgium) BEL	Christian Benteke	7	1	6+1	1	0+0	0	0+0	0
21	GK	(United States) USA	Jon Kempin	3	0	2+0	0	1+0	0	0+0	0
22	FW	(Spain) ESP	Miguel Berry	16	0	8+6	0	2+0	0	0+0	0
23	DF	(United States) USA	Donovan Pines	23	0	16+5	0	1+1	0	0+0	0
24	FW	(United States) USA	Azaad Liadi	2	0	0+1	0	1+0	0	0+0	0
25	FW	(United States) USA	Jackson Hopkins	22	0	11+10	0	1+0	0	0+0	0
28	GK	(United States) USA	Bill Hamid	10	0	10+0	0	0	0	0+0	0
30	DF	(United States) USA	Hayden Sargis	2	0	0	0	1+1	0	0+0	0
32	GK	(Mexico) MEX	David Ochoa	9	0	9+0	0	0+0	0	0+0	0
33	MF	(United States) USA	Jacob Greene	1	0	0	0	1+0	0	0+0	0
35	MF	(United States) USA	Ted Ku-DiPietro	12	0	2+8	0	1+1	0	0+0	0
40	MF	(United States) USA	Tyler Freeman	1	0	0	0	0+1	0	0+0	0
44	MF	(Iceland) ISL	Victor Pálsson	10	0	10+0	0	0+0	0	0+0	0
45	DF	(United States) USA	Matai Akinmboni	2	0	2+0	0	0+0	0	0+0	0
49	MF	(Jamaica) JAM	Ravel Morrison	14	2	11+3	2	0+0	0	0+0	0
50	GK	(Mexico) MEX	Luis Zamudio	0	0	0	0	0	0	0+0	0
65	MF	(Ivory Coast) CIV	Nanan Houssou	1	0	0+0	0	0+1	0	0+0	0
77	MF	(Chile) CHI	Martín Rodríguez	14	0	10+4	0	0+0	0	0+0	0
87	DF	(United States) USA	Rio Hope-Gund	1	0	0+0	0	1+0	0	0+0	0
93	DF	(Mexico) MEX	Tony Alfaro	19	0	9+9	0	1+0	0	0+0	0
97	MF	(Algeria) ALG	Sami Guediri	14	0	10+3	0	1+0	0	0+0	0
Players who left during the season
7	FW	(Ecuador) ECU	Michael Estrada	17	4	11+5	4	1+0	0	0+0	0
10	MF	(Peru) PER	Edison Flores	13	1	11+1	1	1+0	0	0+0	0
22	MF	(United States) USA	Griffin Yow	9	0	3+4	0	2+0	0	0+0	0
27	MF	(Liberia) LBR	Moses Nyeman	2	0	2+0	0	0	0	0+0	0
31	MF	(Germany) GER	Julian Gressel	17	0	16+1	0	0	0	0+0	0
Total				36	39	34	36	2	3	0	0

- Last updated: November 1, 2022
- Source: Team Stats

=== Top scorers ===
Rank	Position	No.	Name	MLS	U.S. Open Cup	MLS Cup	Total
1	MF	11	(Greece) Taxiarchis Fountas	12	0	0	12
2	FW	9	(Norway) Ola Kamara	9	2	0	11
3	FW	7	(Ecuador) Michael Estrada	4	0	0	4
4	DF	15	(United States) Steve Birnbaum	2	0	0	2
4	MF	49	(Jamaica) Ravel Morrison	2	0	0	2
4	FW	19	(Curaçao) Nigel Robertha	1	1	0	2
7	FW	20	(Belgium) Christian Benteke	1	0	0	1
7	MF	6	(United States) Russell Canouse	1	0	0	1
7	MF	8	(United States) Chris Durkin	1	0	0	1
7	FW	26	(United States) Kristian Fletcher	1	0	0	1
7	MF	10	(Peru) Edison Flores	1	0	0	1
7	FW	17	(England) Kimarni Smith	1	0	0	1
Total				35	3	0	38

- Last updated: October 10, 2022
- Source: Team Stats

=== Top assists ===
Rank	Position	No.	Name	MLS	U.S. Open Cup	MLS Cup	Total
1	MF	31	(Germany) Julian Gressel	7	0	0	7
2	MF	8	(United States) Chris Durkin	6	0	0	6
3	FW	7	(Ecuador) Michael Estrada	4	0	0	4
4	MF	11	(Greece) Taxiarchis Fountas	3	0	0	3
4	FW	19	(Curaçao) Nigel Robertha	3	0	0	3
4	FW	77	(Chile) Martín Rodríguez	3	0	0	3
4	FW	17	(England) Kimarni Smith	3	0	0	3
8	DF	14	(Honduras) Andy Najar	2	0	0	2
8	MF	12	(United States) Drew Skundrich	2	0	0	2
8	FW	9	(Norway) Ola Kamara	1	1	0	2
11	DF	93	(Mexico) Tony Alfaro	1	0	0	1
11	MF	6	(United States) Russell Canouse	1	0	0	1
11	MF	13	(France) Sofiane Djeffal	1	0	0	1
11	DF	4	(United States) Brendan Hines-Ike	1	0	0	1
11	MF	25	(United States) Jackson Hopkins	1	0	0	1
11	DF	23	(United States) Donovan Pines	1	0	0	1
11	DF	5	(Australia) Brad Smith	1	0	0	1
Total				40	1	0	41

- Last updated: October 22, 2022
- Source: Team Stats

=== Disciplinary record ===
No.	Pos.	Player	MLS			U.S. Open Cup			MLS Cup			Total		
No.	Pos.	Player	Booked	(yellow card) (yellow-red card)	Sent off (straight red)	Booked	(yellow card) (yellow-red card)	Sent off (straight red)	Booked	(yellow card) (yellow-red card)	Sent off (straight red)	Booked	(yellow card) (yellow-red card)	Sent off (straight red)
4	DF	(United States) Brendan Hines-Ike	1	0	0	0	0	0	0	0	0	1	0	0
5	DF	(Australia) Brad Smith	1	0	0	0	0	0	0	0	0	1	0	0
11	FW	(Ecuador) Michael Estrada	1	0	0	0	0	0	0	0	0	1	0	0
14	DF	(Honduras) Andy Najar	1	0	0	0	0	0	0	0	0	1	0	0
16	FW	(United States) Adrien Perez	1	0	0	0	0	0	0	0	0	1	0	0
27	MF	(Liberia) Moses Nyeman	0	0	1	0	0	0	0	0	0	0	0	1
Total			5	0	1	0	0	0	0	0	0	5	0	1

- Last updated: March 6, 2022
- Source: Team Stats

=== Clean sheets ===
No.	Name	MLS	US Open Cup	MLS Cup	Total	Games
1	Rafael Romo	1	0	0	1	14
21	Jon Kempin	0	1	0	1	4
28	Bill Hamid	2	0	0	2	10
32	David Ochoa	2	0	0	2	9

- Last updated: November 1, 2022
- Source: Goalkeeping Stats

== See also ==
- 2022 Loudoun United FC season
