= 2021 D.C. United season =

D.C. United
2021 season
- General manager: Dave Kasper (until April 14); Lucy Rushton (from April 14)
- Head coach: Hernán Losada
- Stadium: Audi Field
- MLS: Conference: 8th Overall: 16th
- MLS Cup Playoffs: Did not qualify
- U.S. Open Cup: Canceled
- Atlantic Cup: Winners
- Capital Cup: Winners
- Top goalscorer: League: Ola Kamara (19); All: Ola Kamara (19)
- Highest home attendance: 18,034 (10/16 v. NSH)
- Lowest home attendance: 3,935 (5/13 v. CHI)
- Average home league attendance: 12,791
- Biggest win: DC 7–1 TOR (7/3)
- Biggest defeat: NYCFC 6–0 DC (10/23)
Home colors	Away colors

The 2021 D.C. United season was the club's 26th season of existence, and their 26th consecutive season playing in Major League Soccer, the top flight of American soccer. Due to the COVID-19 pandemic and its ongoing vaccination efforts, the season began on April 17, 2021 (about six weeks later than normal) and ended on November 7, 2021. Despite winning against Toronto FC on the last match of the regular season, the team did not qualify playoffs, making it their second consecutive season in which D.C. United did not qualify for the playoffs. It was the first time since 2011, that United did not qualify for the playoffs in consecutive seasons.

Beyond MLS play, D.C. United would have participated in the 2021 U.S. Open Cup, which was initially to begin on May 4, before again being delayed by about six weeks and then ultimately being canceled in July due to the COVID-19 pandemic.

== Background ==
=== Offseason ===
The 2021 season was the first season since 2010 where Ben Olsen was not the club's head coach, as he was fired before the end of the 2020 season while Chad Ashton filled in as the interim head coach. After the 2020 season ended, the team began interviewing multiple candidates for the vacancy. Among the candidates included Ashton, former New York Red Bulls manager Chris Armas, former USWNT coach Jill Ellis, Columbus Crew assistant coach and former LA Galaxy assistant Ezra Hendrickson, and Seattle Sounders FC assistant coach Gonzalo Pineda. However, the team was either unable or unwilling to hire any of those candidates for undisclosed reasons. After a couple months of interviews and expanding the search to Europe, D.C. United officially announced the signing of former Argentine player and current head coach of Beerschot, Hernán Losada, on January 18, 2021.

On the player front, D.C. United declined options on six different players, letting their deals expire. The team also traded Ulises Segura to expansion side Austin FC for cash considerations. Meanwhile, the team signed D.C. United Academy and Loudoun United defender Jacob Greene to a Homegrown Contract. Later, the team picked up forward Adrien Perez from LAFC in the MLS Re-Entry Draft, and acquired Jon Kempin from Columbus to add depth to their goalkeeping corps in exchange for their third-round pick in the 2021 MLS SuperDraft. D.C. added a few more players during the offseason, signing both of their first-round picks in the SuperDraft (Kimarni Smith and Michael DeShields) to first-team deals and later adding Dutch forward Nigel Robertha. In addition, the team took in two players on loan: American defender Brendan Hines-Ike from KV Kortrijk in Belgium, and Venezuelan forward Jovanny Bolívar from Deportivo La Guaira.

With multiple players injured or recovering from injury during the preseason, D.C. signed two additional defenders just before the season-opening match: the veteran and former DCU Academy graduate Andy Najar, and Mexican defender Tony Alfaro, and put them both on the gameday roster.

=== MLS Season ===
With multiple prospective starters on the injury list or not match-fit to Losada's liking, Losada was forced to be creative with his opening day lineup. Among those decisions: Chris Seitz was given the start in goal, Alfaro started at CB despite being signed only a few days prior, and Erik Sorga was given the starting job as the main striker. DC fell behind early as their opponents, NYCFC, got the first goal 15 minutes into the match. Shortly after that, DC woke up and scored a pair of goals from outside the box, with Hines-Ike and Canouse each scoring a goal before the end of the first half. DC would end up winning their first match of the season 2–1. The match was also notable for giving Robertha and Perez their first minutes in a D.C. United jersey, along with Najar's return to the field for D.C. since leaving in 2013, as they were subbed in late into the match.

The following match against the New England Revolution used the same starting lineup, but it turned into a grinding affair with neither team really able to pull ahead. The only action was Hines-Ike accidentally deflecting a Revolution cross into his own net to give DC their first loss of the season, 1–0.

== Management team ==
Position	Name
Chairman	(United States) Jason Levien
Co-Chairman	(United States) Stephen Kaplan
General Manager	(United States) Dave Kasper
Technical Director	(England) Stewart Mairs
Head coach	(Argentina) Hernán Losada
Assistant coach	(Argentina) Nicolás Frutos
Assistant coach	(North Macedonia) Oka Nikolov
Assistant coach	(United States) Chad Ashton
Goalkeeping coach	(United States) Zach Thornton

== Roster ==
Squad No.	Name	Nationality	Position(s)	Date of birth (age)	Apps	Goals	Assists	Signed from
Goalkeepers
1	Chris Seitz	(United States)	GK	March 12, 1987 (age 39)	8	0	0	(United States) Houston Dynamo
21	Jon Kempin	(United States)	GK	April 8, 1993 (age 33)	0	0	0	(United States) Columbus Crew
24	Bill Hamid	(United States)	GK	November 25, 1990 (age 35)	238	0	0	(Denmark) Midtjylland
Defenders
3	Chris Odoi-Atsem	(United States)	RB	May 27, 1995 (age 31)	30	1	0	(United States) Maryland Terrapins
4	Brendan Hines-Ike	(United States)	CB	November 30, 1994 (age 31)	1	1	0	(Belgium) KV Kortrijk (loan)
13	Frédéric Brillant	(France)	CB	June 26, 1985 (age 41)	67	3	4	(United States) New York City FC
14	Andy Najar	(Honduras)	RB	March 16, 1993 (age 33)	83	10	11	(United States) Los Angeles FC
15	Steve Birnbaum	(United States)	CB	January 23, 1991 (age 35)	163	8	3	(United States) California Golden Bears
23	Donovan Pines	(United States)	CB	March 7, 1998 (age 28)	10	0	0	(United States) Maryland Terrapins
28	Joseph Mora	(Costa Rica)	LB	January 15, 1993 (age 33)	51	0	3	(Costa Rica) Saprissa
33	Jacob Greene	(United States)	LB / RB	March 23, 2003 (age 23)	0	0	0	(United States) D.C. United Academy
35	Michael DeShields	(Trinidad and Tobago)	CB	April 23, 1998 (age 28)	0	0	0	(United States) Wake Forest Demon Deacons
93	Tony Alfaro	(Mexico)	CB	June 15, 1993 (age 33)	1	0	0	(United States) Reno 1868
Midfielders
5	Júnior Moreno	(Venezuela)	DM	July 20, 1993 (age 33)	50	0	5	(Venezuela) Zulia
6	Russell Canouse	(United States)	DM	June 11, 1995 (age 31)	57	2	2	(Germany) TSG 1899 Hoffenheim
7	Paul Arriola	(United States)	RM	February 5, 1995 (age 31)	68	14	12	(Mexico) Tijuana
10	Edison Flores	(Peru)	AM / LW	May 14, 1994 (age 32)	14	0	4	(Mexico) Monarcas Morelia
11	Yamil Asad	(Argentina)	LM / LW	July 24, 1994 (age 32)	55	12	7	(Argentina) Vélez Sarsfield
12	Drew Skundrich	(United States)	CM	September 17, 1995 (age 31)	0	0	0	(United States) Loudoun United
18	Felipe	(Brazil)	CM	September 30, 1990 (age 35)	17	0	1	(Canada) Vancouver Whitecaps FC
27	Moses Nyeman	(United States)	CM	November 5, 2003 (age 22)	11	0	0	(United States) D.C. United Academy
30	Kevin Paredes	(United States)	MF	May 7, 2003 (age 23)	17	0	1	(United States) D.C. United Academy
31	Julian Gressel	(Germany)	RM	December 16, 1993 (age 32)	23	2	0	(United States) Atlanta United FC
	Jeremy Garay	(El Salvador)	MF	April 1, 2003 (age 23)	0	0	0	(United States) D.C. United Academy
Forwards
9	Ola Kamara	(Norway)	ST	October 15, 1989 (age 36)	27	7	0	(China) Shenzhen
16	Adrien Perez	(United States)	FW	October 13, 1995 (age 30)	1	0	0	(United States) Los Angeles FC
17	Kimarni Smith	(England)	FW	March 14, 1998 (age 28)	0	0	0	(United States) Clemson Tigers
19	Nigel Robertha	(Curaçao)	FW	March 13, 1998 (age 28)	1	0	0	(Bulgaria) Levski Sofia
20	Jovanny Bolívar	(Venezuela)	FW	December 16, 2001 (age 24)	0	0	0	(Venezuela) Deportivo La Guaira (loan)
22	Griffin Yow	(United States)	FW	September 25, 2002 (age 23)	12	2	0	(United States) D.C. United Academy
29	Yordy Reyna	(Peru)	ST	September 17, 1993 (age 33)	5	0	0	(Canada) Vancouver Whitecaps FC
32	Ramón Ábila	(Argentina)	ST	October 14, 1989 (age 36)	0	0	0	(Argentina) Boca Juniors (loan) (Note: Though acquired off MLS waivers from Minnesota United FC, Abila's acquisition is considered an extension of his current loan agreement between Boca Juniors and MLS, as DC United paid $200,000 of the loan fee to Boca Juniors to complete the transfer.)

== Transfers ==
=== In ===
Date	Position	No.	Name	From	Fee/notes	Ref.
November 25, 2020	DF	33	(United States) Jacob Greene	(United States) D.C. United Academy	Homegrown Player	
January 6, 2021	FW	16	(United States) Adrien Perez	(United States) Los Angeles FC	2020 MLS Re-Entry Draft	
January 8, 2021	GK	21	(United States) Jon Kempin	(United States) Columbus Crew	Traded for third round pick in the 2021 MLS SuperDraft	
February 5, 2021	DF	35	(Trinidad and Tobago) Michael DeShields	(United States) Wake Forest Demon Deacons	Signed from the 2021 MLS SuperDraft	
March 8, 2021	FW	17	(England) Kimarni Smith	(United States) Clemson Tigers	Signed from the 2021 MLS SuperDraft	
March 23, 2021	FW	19	(Curaçao) Nigel Robertha	(Bulgaria) Levski Sofia		
April 15, 2021	DF	14	(Honduras) Andy Najar	(United States) Los Angeles FC		
April 15, 2021	DF	93	(Mexico) Tony Alfaro	(United States) Reno 1868		
May 12, 2021	MF	12	(United States) Drew Skundrich	(United States) Loudoun United	2021 guaranteed, 2022–23 team options	
July 2, 2021	MF		(El Salvador) Jeremy Garay	(United States) D.C. United Academy	Homegrown Player	

=== Out ===
Date	Position	No.	Name	To	Fee/notes	Ref.
November 30, 2020	MF	25	(Ghana) Mohammed Abu	(Norway) Vålerenga	End of loan	
November 30, 2020	GK	36	(United States) Earl Edwards Jr.	(United States) New England Revolution	Option Declined	
November 30, 2020	DF	91	(Jamaica) Oniel Fisher	(United States) L.A. Galaxy	Option Declined	
November 30, 2020	FW	20	(Venezuela) Gelmin Rivas	(Iraq) Al-Shorta	Option Declined	
November 30, 2020	DF	44	(Sweden) Axel Sjöberg	(United States) San Antonio FC	Option Declined	
December 13, 2020	MF	8	(Costa Rica) Ulises Segura	(United States) Austin FC	$150,000 GAM	

=== Loan in ===
No.	Pos.	Player	Loaned from	Start	End	Source
4	DF	(United States) Brendan Hines-Ike	(Belgium) Kortrijk	March 10, 2021	December 31, 2021	
20	FW	(Venezuela) Jovanny Bolívar	(Venezuela) Guaira	March 10, 2021	December 31, 2021	
32	FW	(Argentina) Ramón Ábila	(Argentina) Boca Juniors	August 12, 2021	December 31, 2021	

=== Loan out ===
No.	Pos.	Player	Loaned to	Start	End	Source
35	DF	(Trinidad and Tobago) Michael DeShields	(United States) Loudoun United	May 1, 2021	October 30, 2021	
17	FW	(England) Kimarni Smith	(United States) Loudoun United	June 25, 2021	October 30, 2021	
50	FW	(Estonia) Erik Sorga	(Netherlands) VVV-Venlo	August 12, 2021	December 31, 2021	

=== MLS SuperDraft picks ===
2021 D.C. United SuperDraft Picks
Round	Selection	Player	Position	College	Status
1	4	(England) Kimarni Smith	FW	Clemson	Signed to first team
1	5	(Trinidad and Tobago) Michael DeShields	DF	Wake Forest	Signed to first team
2	32	(United States) Logan Panchot	MF/DF	Stanford	Signed with Loudoun United FC

== Non-competitive ==
=== Preseason ===
March 20	D.C. United	1–1	Greenville Triumph SC	Cary
14:00 EST	Smith 29'	Report	McLean 27'	Stadium: WakeMed Soccer Park; Attendance: 0

March 26	D.C. United	5–1	Loudoun United FC	Washington
15:00 EST	Kamara 19'; Brillant 30'; Unsigned Player 72'; Unsigned Player 88'; Unsigned Player 90'	Report	Amoustapha 84'	Stadium: Audi Field; Attendance: 0

March 31	Philadelphia Union	2–0	D.C. United	Chester
3:00 pm	Fontana 3', 37'; Bedoya (yellow card) 74'	Report	Moreno (yellow card) 67'	Stadium: Subaru Park; Attendance: 0

April 4	D.C. United	1–2	New York City FC	Chester
15:00 EST	Smith 29' (Flores); Moreno (red card) 44'	Report	Castellanos 25' (Þórarinsson), (red card) 44'; Jasson 50'	Stadium: Power Training Complex; Attendance: 0

April 10	New York Red Bulls	1–1	D.C. United	Harrison
13:00 EST	63' (pen.)		Sorga 52'	Stadium: Red Bull Arena; Attendance: 0

=== Midseason friendlies ===
July 7 Capital Cup first leg	D.C. United	1–0	Alajuelense	Washington
20:00 EDT	Felipe 86'	Report		Stadium: Audi Field; Attendance: 6,000

July 11 Capital Cup second leg	Alajuelense	0–1 (0–2 agg.)	D.C. United	Washington
20:00 EDT		Report	Bolívar 68'	Stadium: Audi Field; Attendance: 5,000

July 11	D.C. United	—	Puebla	Washington
20:00 EDT				Stadium: Audi Field
Note: Match cancelled after Club Puebla withdrew due to COVID-19 protocols.

July 14	D.C. United	1–0	Alianza	Washington
20:30 EDT	Ferrin 72'	Report		Stadium: Audi Field; Attendance: 3,192

== Competitive ==
=== Major League Soccer ===
==== Standings ====
===== Eastern Conference =====
Pos	Team	Pld	W	L	T	GF	GA	GD	Pts	Qualification
6	Orlando City SC	34	13	9	12	50	48	+2	51	Qualification for the playoffs first round
7	New York Red Bulls	34	13	12	9	39	33	+6	48	Qualification for the playoffs first round
8	D.C. United	34	14	15	5	56	54	+2	47	
9	Columbus Crew	34	13	13	8	46	45	+1	47	
10	CF Montréal (Note: Canadian clubs cannot qualify for the 2022 CONCACAF Champions League through the MLS regular season or playoffs.)	34	12	12	10	46	44	+2	46	Qualification for the CONCACAF Champions League (Note: As 2021 Canadian Championship winners)

Source: MLS
Rules for classification: 1) points; 2) total wins; 3) total goal differential; 4) total goals scored; 5) fewer disciplinary points; 6) away goal differential; 7) away goals scored; 8) home goals differential; 9) home goals scored; 10) coin toss (2 clubs tied) or drawing of lots (≥3 clubs tied)

===== Overall table =====
Pos	Team	Pld	W	L	T	GF	GA	GD	Pts	Qualification
14	New York Red Bulls	34	13	12	9	39	33	+6	48	
15	LA Galaxy	34	13	12	9	50	54	−4	48	
16	D.C. United	34	14	15	5	56	54	+2	47	
17	Columbus Crew	34	13	13	8	46	45	+1	47	
18	CF Montréal (V)	34	12	12	10	46	44	+2	46	Qualification for the 2022 CONCACAF Champions League (Note: As 2021 Canadian Championship winners (CAN1))

Source: MLS
Rules for classification: 1) points; 2) total wins; 3) total goal differential; 4) total goals scored; 5) fewer disciplinary points; 6) away goal differential; 7) away goals scored; 8) home goals differential; 9) home goals scored; 10) coin toss (2 clubs tied) or drawing of lots (≥3 clubs tied)
(V) Canadian Championship winner

==== Results summary ====
Overall								Home						Away					
Pld	Pts	W	L	T	GF	GA	GD	W	L	T	GF	GA	GD	W	L	T	GF	GA	GD
22	30	9	10	3	35	32	+3	7	3	0	18	8	+10	2	7	3	17	24	−7

Pld = Matches played; Pts = Points; W = Matches won; T = Matches tied; L = Matches lost; GF = Goals for; GA = Goals against; GD = Goal difference

==== Results by round ====
Round	1	2	3	4	5	6	7	8	9	10	11	12	13	14	15	16	17	18	19	20	21	22	23	24
Stadium	H	A	A	A	H	H	H	A	H	A	A	H	A	A	H	A	A	H	A	A	H	H	A	
Result	W	L	L	L	W	L	L	W	W	D	L	W	L	D	W	D	W	W	L	L	L	W	D	

Source: D.C. United schedule
A = Away; H = Home; W = Win; D = Draw; L = Loss

==== Match results ====
April 17 1	D.C. United	2–1	New York City FC	Washington, D.C.
20:00 EDT	Brillant (yellow card) 9'; Hines-Ike 39'; Canouse 44'; Gressel (yellow card) 77'	Report	Castellanos 15', (yellow card) 74'; Tinnerholm (yellow card) 82'	Stadium: Audi Field; Attendance: 4,500; Referee: Ted Unkel

April 24 2	New England Revolution	1–0	D.C. United	Foxborough
20:00 EDT	Traustason (yellow card) 32'; Hines-Ike 48' (o.g.); Kaptoum (yellow card) 60'; Farrell (yellow card) 80'; Buksa (yellow card) 89'	Report	Canouse (yellow card) 25'; Moreno (yellow card) 58'; Hines-Ike (yellow card) 90+4'	Stadium: Gillette Stadium; Attendance: 8,000

May 1 3	San Jose Earthquakes	4–1	D.C. United	San Jose
22:00 EDT	López 1', (yellow card) 69'; Cowell 26'; Marie (yellow card) 35'; Yueill 43', 85'; Remedi (yellow card) 88'	Report	Alfaro (yellow card) 18', (goal) 31'; Nyeman (yellow card) 68'	Stadium: Earthquakes Stadium; Attendance: 3,600

May 8 4	Columbus Crew	3–1	D.C. United	Columbus
13:30 EDT	Zelarayán 20'; Afful (yellow card) 29'; Williams (yellow card) 30'; Francis (yellow card) 58'; Brillant 63' (o.g.); Alfaro 83' (o.g.)	Report	Asad (yellow card) 42'; Kamara 82'	Stadium: Historic Crew Stadium; Attendance: 5,180

May 13 5	D.C. United	1–0	Chicago Fire FC	Washington, D.C.
20:00 EDT	Hines-Ike (yellow card) 4'; Flores 7'; Gressel (yellow card) 47'	Report	Omsberg (yellow card) 19'; Frankowski (yellow card) 52'; Herbers (yellow card) 64'	Stadium: Audi Field; Attendance: 3,935

May 16 6	D.C. United	0–1	Orlando City SC	Washington, D.C.
20:00 EDT	Hines-Ike (yellow card) 42'; Brillant (yellow card) 90+7'	Report	Pereyra 7'; Moutinho (yellow card) 61'; Pereyra (yellow card) 69'; Mueller (yellow card) 90+3'; Nani (yellow card) 90+5'	Stadium: Audi Field; Attendance: 5,280; Referee: Alex Chilowicz

May 23 7	D.C. United	0–1	Philadelphia Union	Washington, D.C.
19:00 EDT		Report	Przybyłko 45+1'; Martínez (yellow card) 65'; Blake (yellow card) 90+5'	Stadium: Audi Field; Attendance: 6,200; Referee: Tim Ford

May 29 8	Inter Miami CF	0–3	D.C. United	Fort Lauderdale
20:00 EDT	Figal (yellow card) 52'	Report	Kamara 15', 71'; Arriola 21' (yellow card) 52'; Paredes (yellow card) 52'; Hines-Ike (yellow card) 90+2'	Stadium: DRV PNK Stadium; Attendance: 15,945; Referee: Armando Villarreal

June 19 9	D.C. United	1–0	Inter Miami CF	Washington, D.C.
20:00 EDT	Paredes (yellow card) 25'; Felipe (yellow card) 37'; Kamara 72' (pen.)	Report	Makoun (yellow card) 23'; Carranza (yellow card) 37'; Gregore (yellow card) 47' (yellow-red card) 56'	Stadium: Audi Field; Attendance: 15,500; Referee: Fotis Bazakos

June 23 10	CF Montréal	0–0	D.C. United	Fort Lauderdale
19:30 EDT	Bassong (yellow card) 35' (yellow-red card) 45'	Report		Stadium: DRV PNK Stadium; Attendance: 0
Note: Due to COVID-19 travel restrictions, the match is expected to take place at DRV PNK Stadium in Fort Lauderdale, Florida. CF Montréal will play as the home team for this match.

June 27 11	New York City FC	2–1	D.C. United	Harrison, New Jersey
18:00 EDT	Parks 84'; Andrade 90+5'	Report	Robertha 9' (yellow card) 70'; Mora (yellow card) 52'; Najar (yellow card) 78'	Stadium: Red Bull Arena; Attendance: 4,533; Referee: Robert Sibiga
Note: The match was played at Red Bull Arena instead of Yankee Stadium due to scheduling conflicts. New York City FC played as the home team.

July 3 12	D.C. United	7–1	Toronto FC	Washington, D.C.
17:30 EDT	Paredes 2'; Robertha 8'; Priso 21' (o.g.); Gressel (yellow card) 57'; Arriola 71'; Kamara 81'; Asad 85'; Yow 90'	Report	Gonzalez (yellow card) 35'; Akinola 39'; Osorio (yellow card) 45+2'; Zavaleta (yellow card) 75' (yellow-red card) 78'	Stadium: Audi Field; Attendance: 14,000; Referee: Lukasz Szpala

July 17 13	Philadelphia Union	2–1	D.C. United	Chester
19:30 EDT	Santos 10'; Martínez (yellow card) 22'; Przybyłko 83'	Report	Asad (yellow card) 27', (goal) 51' (pen.); Reyna (yellow card) 45+1'	Stadium: Subaru Park; Attendance: 16,821; Referee: Alex Chilowicz
Note: The match was suspended before 9:30 PM ET at the 87th minute due to inclement weather. The match later resumed at 11:20 PM ET.

July 21 14	Chicago Fire	2–2	D.C. United	Chicago
20:00 EDT	Giménez 32', (yellow card) 62'; Najar 61' (o.g.); Medrán (yellow card) 65'	Report	Najar (yellow card) 55'; Paredes 82'; Skundrich (yellow card) 84'; Kamara 87' (pen.)	Stadium: Soldier Field; Attendance: 8,306; Referee: Marcos de Oliveira

July 25 15	D.C. United	1–0	New York Red Bulls	Washington, D.C.
20:00 EDT	Alfaro (yellow card) 12'; Kamara 27'; Brillant (yellow card) 87'; Hamid (yellow card) 90+6'	Report	Fábio (yellow card) 46'; Klimala (yellow card) 69'; Edwards (yellow card) 80'; Cásseres Jr. (yellow card) 83'	Stadium: Audi Field; Attendance: 15,912; Referee: Alan Kelly

July 31 16	FC Cincinnati	0–0	D.C. United	Cincinnati
19:30 EDT	Gyau (yellow card) 36'; Acosta (yellow card) 60'; Hagglund (yellow card) 64'	Report	Moreno (yellow card) 15'; Mora (yellow card) 41' (yellow-red card) 90+2'; Nyeman (red card) 52'; Reyna (yellow card) 72'	Stadium: West End Stadium; Attendance: 25,060; Referee: Rosendo Mendoza

August 4 17	Columbus Crew	2–4	D.C. United	Columbus
19:30 EDT	Keita (yellow card) 24'; Etienne (yellow card) 30'; Mensah (yellow card) 45+1'; Molino 65'; Zelarayán 71'	Report	Kamara 19', 45+3' (pen.); Reyna 40', 74'; Alfaro (yellow card) 66'	Stadium: Lower.com Field; Attendance: 18,398; Referee: Victor Rivas

August 8 18	D.C. United	2–1	CF Montréal	Washington, D.C.
20:00 EDT	Najar 40'; Kamara 54'	Report	Waterman (yellow card) 3'; Brault-Guillard 16'; Miller (yellow card) 57'	Stadium: Audi Field; Attendance: 14,169; Referee: Marcos de Oliveira

August 15 19	Nashville SC	5–2	D.C. United	Nashville
19:00 EDT	Sapong 14', 31'; Mukhtar 37'; Muyl 80', 87' (pen.)	Report	Brillant 3'; Kamara 41'	Stadium: Nissan Stadium; Attendance: 20,022; Referee: Drew Fischer

August 18 20	New England Revolution	3–2	D.C. United	Foxborough
19:00 EDT	Traustason (yellow card) 33' (yellow-red card) 72'; Kaptoum (yellow card) 42'; McNamara 49'; Buchanan 53'; DeLaGarza (yellow card) 60'; Jones 85'	Report	Arriola 10'; Asad (yellow card) 32'; Birnbaum (yellow card) 78'; Ábila 90+6'	Stadium: Gillette Stadium; Attendance: 11,419; Referee: Ted Unkel

August 21 21	D.C. United	1–2	Atlanta United FC	Washington, D.C.
20:00 EDT	Alfaro (yellow card) 50'; Reyna 54'; Canouse (yellow card) 58'; J. Moreno (yellow card) 73'; Gressel (yellow card) 75'	Report	Martínez 25'; Bello (yellow card) 29'; M. Moreno 82'	Stadium: Audi Field; Attendance: 17,180; Referee: Nima Saghafi

August 28 22	D.C. United	3–1	Philadelphia Union	Washington, D.C.
20:00 EDT	Kamara 36' (pen.); Reyna 49'; Najar (yellow card) 55'; Ábila 90+5'	Report	Birnbaum 22' (o.g.); Elliott (yellow card) 59'	Stadium: Audi Field; Attendance: 16,593; Referee: Rubiel Vazquez

September 11 23	New York Red Bulls	1–1	D.C. United	Harrison, NJ
19:00 EDT	Yearwood 5'; Nealis (yellow card) 44'; Edwards (yellow card) 75'	Report	Kamara 44' (pen.); Skundrich (yellow card) 50'	Stadium: Red Bull Arena; Referee: Robert Sibiga

September 15 24	D.C. United	3–0	Chicago Fire	Washington, D.C.
20:00 EDT	Kamara 9' (pen.), 35' (pen.), 44'; Pines (yellow card) 12'; Gressel (yellow card) 53'	Report	Terán (yellow card) 7'; Giménez (yellow card) 11'	Stadium: Audi Field; Attendance: 13,524; Referee: David Gantar

September 18 25	Atlanta United	3–2	D.C. United	Atlanta
15:30 EDT	Barco 18'; Martínez 64'; Franco (yellow card) 65'; Araújo (yellow card) 81'; Bello 87'	Report	Brillant (yellow card) 27'; J. Moreno (yellow card) 34'; Paredes (yellow card) 50'; Felipe 75'; Alfaro (yellow card) 77'; Flores 90+4'	Stadium: Mercedes-Benz Stadium; Attendance: 42,608; Referee: Joseph Dickerson

September 25 26	D.C. United	4–2	FC Cincinnati	Washington, D.C.
19:30 EDT	Arriola 7', 41'; Birnbaum 21'; Hamid (yellow card) 34'; Robertha 72'	Report	Vázquez 80'; Acosta 84'	Stadium: Audi Field; Attendance: 16,069; Referee: Chris Penso

September 29 27	D.C. United	3–1	Minnesota United FC	Washington, D.C.
20:00 EDT	Kamara 23'; Gressel 45'; Birnbaum (yellow card) 59'; Arriola (yellow card) 66'; Moreno 85'	Report	Hayes (yellow card) 18'; Dibassy 40'; Trapp (yellow card) 43'; Kallman (yellow card) 79'; Gasper (yellow card) 88'	Stadium: Audi Field; Attendance: 12,262; Referee: Ramy Touchan

October 2 28	Orlando City	2–1	D.C. United	Orlando
19:30 EDT	Jansson 17'; Dike 90+7'	Report	Gressel 6'; Vázquez (yellow card) 20'; Canouse (yellow card) 67'; Hamid (yellow card) 90+5'	Stadium: Exploria Stadium; Attendance: 16,848; Referee: Guido Gonzales Jr.

October 16 29	D.C. United	0–0	Nashville SC	Washington, D.C.
19:30 EDT	Canouse (yellow card) 33'; Mora (yellow card) 46'	Report	Mukhtar (yellow card) 62'; McCarty (yellow card) 90+4'	Stadium: Audi Field; Attendance: 18,034; Referee: Ismail Elfath

October 20 30	D.C. United	2–3	New England Revolution	Washington, D.C.
20:00 EDT	Felipe (yellow card) 18'; Robertha 53'; Ábila 90+3'	Report	Polster (yellow card) 45'; Buksa 61'; Gil 64'; Bou 79'	Stadium: Audi Field; Attendance: 13,387; Referee: Nima Saghafi

October 23 31	New York City FC	6–0	D.C. United	Harrison
19:30 EDT	Andrade 1'; Castellanos 7', 11'; Sands (yellow card) 33'; Moralez 43'; Callens 52'; Medina 74'	Report	Canouse (yellow card) 3'; Birnbaum (yellow card) 54'	Stadium: Red Bull Arena; Referee: Joseph Dickerson

October 27 32	D.C. United	1–0	New York Red Bulls	Washington, D.C.
20:00 EDT	Paredes 9'; Moreno (yellow card) 36'; Najar (yellow card) 64'	Report		Stadium: Audi Field; Attendance: 14,109; Referee: Rubiel Vazquez

October 30 33	D.C. United	1–3	Columbus Crew	Washington, D.C.
19:30 EDT	Arriola 3', (yellow card) 32'; Felipe (yellow card) 79'	Report	Valenzuela (yellow card) 42'; Zelarayán 45' (pen.), 76'; Santos 66'	Stadium: Audi Field; Attendance: 16,787; Referee: Drew Fischer

November 7 34	Toronto FC	1–3	D.C. United	Toronto
15:30 PM EST	Laryea 18'; Dwyer (yellow card) 74'	Report	Birnbaum 13', (yellow card) 90'; Kamara 30' (pen.), 36'; Felipe (yellow card) 65'; Pines (yellow card) 76'; Mora (yellow card) 85'	Stadium: BMO Field; Attendance: 11,166; Referee: Marcos de Oliveira

=== U.S. Open Cup ===
The U.S. Open Cup was canceled due to the COVID-19 pandemic for a second consecutive year.

== Statistics ==
=== Appearances and goals ===
Numbers after plus–sign (+) denote appearances as a substitute.

No.	Pos	Nat	Player	Total		MLS		MLS Cup		Capital Cup	
No.	Pos	Nat	Player	Apps	Goals	Apps	Goals	Apps	Goals	Apps	Goals
1	GK	(United States) USA	Chris Seitz	5	0	4+0	0	0	0	0+1	0
3	DF	(United States) USA	Chris Odoi-Atsem	2	0	1+1	0	0	0	0	0
4	DF	(United States) USA	Brendan Hines-Ike	11	1	11+0	1	0	0	0	0
5	MF	(Venezuela) VEN	Júnior Moreno	19	0	19+0	0	0	0	0	0
6	MF	(United States) USA	Russell Canouse	14	1	14+0	1	0	0	0	0
7	MF	(United States) USA	Paul Arriola	14	3	13+1	3	0	0	0	0
8	MF	(Brazil) BRA	Felipe Martins	21	2	5+15	1	0	0	1+0	1
9	FW	(Norway) NOR	Ola Kamara	19	16	13+6	16	0	0	0	0
10	MF	(Peru) PER	Edison Flores	13	2	10+3	2	0	0	0	0
11	MF	(Argentina) ARG	Yamil Asad	18	2	8+8	2	0	0	2+0	0
12	MF	(United States) USA	Drew Skundrich	14	0	8+6	0	0	0	0	0
13	DF	(France) FRA	Frédéric Brillant	20	1	14+4	1	0	0	2+0	0
14	DF	(Honduras) HON	Andy Najar	19	1	16+3	1	0	0	0	0
15	DF	(United States) USA	Steve Birnbaum	14	0	9+3	0	0	0	2+0	0
16	FW	(United States) USA	Adrien Perez	13	0	9+4	0	0	0	0	0
17	FW	(England) ENG	Kimarni Smith	4	0	1+2	0	0	0	0+1	0
18	MF	(United States) USA	Nicky Downs	1	0	0	0	0	0	0+1	0
19	FW	(Curaçao) CUW	Nigel Robertha	10	2	4+5	2	0	0	1+0	0
20	FW	(Venezuela) VEN	Jovanny Bolívar	1	1	0	0	0	0	1+0	1
21	GK	(United States) USA	Jon Kempin	12	0	9+1	0	0	0	2+0	0
22	FW	(United States) USA	Griffin Yow	11	1	1+8	1	0	0	2+0	0
23	DF	(United States) USA	Donovan Pines	9	0	8+1	0	0	0	0	0
24	GK	(United States) USA	Bill Hamid	12	0	12+0	0	0	0	0	0
26	DF	(Ivory Coast) CIV	Gaoussou Samaké	1	0	0	0	0	0	1+0	0
27	MF	(Liberia) LBR	Moses Nyeman	19	0	10+8	0	0	0	1+0	0
28	DF	(Costa Rica) CRC	Joseph Mora	21	0	13+6	0	0	0	2+0	0
29	FW	(Peru) PER	Yordy Reyna	15	4	6+8	4	0	0	1+0	0
30	MF	(United States) USA	Kevin Paredes	18	2	14+4	2	0	0	0	0
31	MF	(Germany) GER	Julian Gressel	25	0	22+3	0	0	0	0	0
32	FW	(Argentina) ARG	Ramón Ábila	6	2	0+6	2	0	0	0	0
33	DF	(United States) USA	Jacob Greene	2	0	0	0	0	0	1+1	0
35	DF	(Trinidad and Tobago) TTO	Michael DeShields	0	0	0	0	0	0	0	0
39	MF	(Ivory Coast) CIV	Nanan Houssou	2	0	0	0	0	0	0+2	0
41	FW	(Niger) NIG	Kairou Amoustapha	1	0	0	0	0	0	0+1	0
50	FW	(Estonia) EST	Erik Sorga	4	0	2+2	0	0	0	0	0
51	DF	(El Salvador) ESA	Allexon Saravia	1	0	0	0	0	0	0+1	0
93	DF	(Mexico) MEX	Tony Alfaro	22	0	18+3	0	0	0	1+0	0

- Last updated: September 22, 2021
- Source: Soccerway

=== Top scorers ===
Rank	Position	Number	Name	MLS	MLS Cup	Total
1	FW	9	Ola Kamara	16	0	16
2	FW	29	Yordy Reyna	4	0	4
3	MF	7	Paul Arriola	3	0	3
4	MF	10	Edison Flores	2	0	2
4	MF	11	Yamil Asad	2	0	2
4	FW	19	Nigel Robertha	2	0	2
4	MF	30	Kevin Paredes	2	0	2
4	FW	32	Ramón Ábila	2	0	2
9	DF	4	Brendan Hines-Ike	1	0	1
9	MF	6	Russell Canouse	1	0	1
9	DF	13	Frédéric Brillant	1	0	1
9	DF	14	Andy Najar	1	0	1
9	FW	22	Griffin Yow	1	0	1
9	MF	8	Felipe Martins	1	0	1

=== Top assists ===
Rank	Position	Number	Name	MLS	MLS Cup	Total
1	MF	31	Julian Gressel	5	0	5
2	FW	9	Ola Kamara	3	0	3
2	DF	14	Andy Najar	3	0	3
4	MF	7	Paul Arriola	2	0	2
4	MF	10	Edison Flores	2	0	2
4	MF	5	Júnior Moreno	2	0	2
4	FW	16	Adrien Perez	2	0	2
8	FW	29	Yordy Reyna	1	0	1
8	MF	11	Yamil Asad	1	0	1
8	MF	6	Russell Canouse	1	0	1
8	MF	8	Felipe Martins	1	0	1
8	FW	22	Griffin Yow	1	0	1
8	DF	93	Tony Alfaro	1	0	1
8	MF	12	Drew Skundrich	1	0	1
8	MF	27	Moses Nyeman	1	0	1

=== Disciplinary record ===
No.	Pos.	Player	MLS			MLS Cup			U.S. Open Cup			Total		
No.	Pos.	Player	Booked	(yellow card) (yellow-red card)	Sent off (straight red)	Booked	(yellow card) (yellow-red card)	Sent off (straight red)	Booked	(yellow card) (yellow-red card)	Sent off (straight red)	Booked	(yellow card) (yellow-red card)	Sent off (straight red)

== Awards ==
Awards will be announced as the season begins.
