= José Alfaro =

José Alfaro may refer to:

- José Alfaro (boxer) (born 1983), Nicaraguan boxer
- José Alfaro (footballer) (born 2000), Costa Rican footballer
- José Miguel Alfaro Rodríguez (1940–2013), vice president of Costa Rica
- Tony Alfaro (José Antonio Alfaro) (born 1993), Mexican footballer
