= Felipe Martins =

Felipe Martins may refer to:

- Felipe Martins (footballer, born September 1990), Felipe Campanholi Martins, Brazilian football midfielder
- Felipe Martins (footballer, born November 1990), Felipe Santos Martins, Brazilian football striker

== See also ==
- Felipe Trevizan (born 1987), Felipe Trevizan Martins, Brazilian football centre-back
