= Donovan Pines =

American soccer player

Personal information
- Full name: Donovan Cameron Pines
- Date of birth: March 7, 1998 (age 28)
- Place of birth: Clarksville, Maryland, United States
- Height: 6 ft 5 in (1.96 m)
- Position: Center-back

Team information
- Current team: Grazer AK
- Number: 2

Youth career
- 2014–2016: D.C. United

College career
Years	Team	Apps	(Gls)
2016–2018	Maryland Terrapins	56	(3)

Senior career*
Years	Team	Apps	(Gls)
2019–2023	D.C. United	86	(6)
2019	→ Loudoun United (loan)	6	(0)
2024–2025	Barnsley	28	(4)
2025–	Grazer AK	30	(1)

International career^{‡}
2019	United States U23	2	(0)
2021	United States	2	(0)
Medal record
Representing United States
Winner	CONCACAF Gold Cup	2021
- * Club domestic league appearances and goals as of June 10, 2026 ‡ National team caps and goals as of February 14, 2024

Donovan Cameron Pines (born March 7, 1998) is an American professional soccer player who plays as a center-back for Austrian Bundesliga club Grazer AK.

== Club career ==
Pines played soccer for River Hill High School before attending University of Maryland College Park. Pines played three years of college soccer for the Terrapins and was a starter all three years at Maryland where he made 56 appearances, and scored 3 goals. At the end of the 2016 NCAA Division I men's soccer season, he was honored with Big Ten All-Freshman Team recognition. He was named to the All-Big Ten Second Team his sophomore year, before having a breakout season his junior year. Concluding the 2018 NCAA Division I men's soccer season, he was part of the national championship-winning Maryland team. Individually, Pines was named to the All-Big Ten First Team, the Top Drawer Soccer Best XI, as well as the College Cup All-Tournament Team.

Concluding the 2018 NCAA soccer season, Pines was linked to several European clubs, but ultimately signed a homegrown contract with D.C. United on January 18, 2019.

Ahead of the 2019 USL Championship season, Pines went on a season-long loan to D.C. United's reserve side, Loudoun United FC. Pines made his professional soccer debut on March 9, 2019, for Loudoun United in a 0–2 loss to Nashville SC. Pines played the entire match.

Pines made his Major League Soccer debut with D.C. United on April 13, 2019, against the Colorado Rapids at Dick's Sporting Goods Park. He played the full 90 minutes and recorded an assist to Luciano Acosta in a 3–2 win over the Rapids. On April 28, 2019, in a game against Minnesota United, Pines scored what would've been his first goal for D.C. United but it was disallowed by VAR due to a foul during the play. In early May, Pines sprained a ligament in his knee after a 3–1 win against the Columbus Crew. He returned from his injury on June 26, 2019.

Pines scored his first MLS goal in a 2–2 draw against the Philadelphia Union on October 14, 2020. He scored his second goal for United just four days later in a 2–1 win over FC Cincinnati.

In January 2024 he signed for English club Barnsley. He departed the club at the end of the 2024–25 season.

On 4 August 2025, Pines joined Austrian Bundesliga club Grazer AK on a one-year deal.

== International career ==
Pines made his senior debut for the United States on July 15, 2021, when he was subbed on in the 79th minute of a 6–1 win over Martinique in the group stage of the 2021 CONCACAF Gold Cup.

== Career statistics ==
=== Club ===
As of match played March 22, 2025

Appearances and goals by club, season and competition
Club	Season	League			National cup (Note: Includes U.S. Open Cup, FA Cup)		League cup (Note: Includes EFL Cup)		Other		Total	
Club	Season	Division	Apps	Goals	Apps	Goals	Apps	Goals	Apps	Goals	Apps	Goals
D.C. United	2019	MLS	10	0	0	0	–		0	0	10	0
D.C. United	2020	MLS	16	3	0	0	–		0	0	16	3
D.C. United	2021	MLS	18	0	0	0	–		0	0	18	0
D.C. United	2022	MLS	21	0	2	0	–		0	0	23	0
D.C. United	2023	MLS	22	3	1	0	–		3 (Note: Appearances in Leagues Cup)	0	26	3
D.C. United	Total		87	6	3	0	–		3	0	93	6
Loudoun United (loan)	2019	USL	6	0	0	0	–		0	0	6	0
Barnsley	2023–24	EFL League One	4	2	0	0	0	0	0	0	4	2
Barnsley	2024–25	EFL League One	24	2	0	0	2	1	1 (Note: Appearances in EFL Trophy)	0	27	3
Barnsley	Total		28	4	0	0	2	1	1	0	31	5
Career total			121	10	3	0	2	1	4	0	130	11

=== International ===
As of match played July 17, 2021

Appearances and goals by national team and year
National team	Year	Apps	Goals
United States	2021	2	0
Total		2	0

== Honors ==
Maryland Terrapins

- NCAA Division I men's soccer tournament: 2018

United States

- CONCACAF Gold Cup: 2021

Individual

- 2018 College Cup All-Tournament Team
- 2018 United Soccer Coaches Second Team All-American
- 2018 Top Drawer Soccer Best XI First Team
- 2018 United Soccer Coaches First Team All-Region
- 2018 All-Big Ten First Team
- 2017 All-Big Ten Second Team
- Top Drawer Soccer National Team of the Week (9/25/17)
- 2016 Big Ten All-Freshman Team
