= Moses Nyeman =

American soccer player (born 2003)

Personal information
- Full name: Moses Blessing Nyeman
- Date of birth: November 5, 2003 (age 23)
- Place of birth: Monrovia, Liberia
- Height: 5 ft 5 in (1.65 m)
- Position: Midfielder

Team information
- Current team: Columbus Crew 2
- Number: 33

Youth career
- 2015–2019: D.C. United

Senior career*
| Years | Team | Apps | (Gls) |
| 2019–2022 | Loudoun United | 18 | (2) |
| 2019–2022 | D.C. United | 32 | (0) |
| 2022–2023 | Beveren | 0 | (0) |
| 2023 | → Real Salt Lake (loan) | 2 | (0) |
| 2023 | → Real Monarchs (loan) | 16 | (1) |
| 2024 | Minnesota United | 4 | (0) |
| 2024 | Minnesota United 2 | 17 | (0) |
| 2025 | Loudoun United | 16 | (1) |
| 2026– | Columbus Crew 2 | 14 | (0) |

International career^{‡}
| 2019 | United States U16 | 5 | (1) |
| 2019 | United States U17 | 3 | (2) |
- * Club domestic league appearances and goals as of October 8, 2026 ‡ National team caps and goals as of November 16, 2019

Moses Blessing Nyeman (born November 5, 2003) is a professional soccer player who plays as a midfielder for MLS Next Pro club Columbus Crew 2. Born in Liberia, he has represented the United States at youth level.

== Club career ==
=== Professional ===
Nyeman scored his first professional goal against Louisville City FC on July 29, 2019, for Loudoun United in the USL Championship.

On October 3, 2019, Nyeman signed with MLS club D.C. United. In doing so, he became the 13th homegrown player to be signed by D.C. United and, at age 15, the second youngest signing in club history. He continued to play for Loudoun United for the remainder of the 2019–20 season. During the MLS and USL offseason, he trained with Borussia Dortmund's U-19 team.

Nyeman made his MLS debut for D.C. United on August 29, 2020, in a 1–4 loss against the Philadelphia Union. He made his first start for the team on September 27, 2020, in a 0–2 loss against the New England Revolution.

On August 31, 2022, Nyeman joined Belgian Challenger Pro League side S.K. Beveren on a two-year deal for an undisclosed fee.

On February 20, 2023, Nyeman was loaned to Real Salt Lake for the 2023 MLS season.

On January 25, 2024, Nyeman made the permanent move to Minnesota United on a three-year deal.

Nyeman returned to Loudoun United, signing a one-year deal with the USL Championship side on January 29, 2025. Nyeman was released by Loudoun following their 2025 season.

On February 7, 2026, Nyeman signed with Columbus Crew 2 for the 2026 MLS Next Pro season.

== International career ==
Nyeman is eligible to represent both his native Liberia and the United States. He has represented the United States at the under-16 level several times, but never in an official match.

== Career statistics ==
=== Club ===
As of match played June 21, 2023

Appearances and goals by club, season and competition
| Club | Season | League | | | National cup | | Continental | | Other | | Total | |
| Club | Season | Division | Apps | Goals | Apps | Goals | Apps | Goals | Apps | Goals | Apps | Goals |
|---|---|---|---|---|---|---|---|---|---|---|---|---|
| Loudoun United | 2019 | USL | 15 | 1 | — | | — | | — | | 15 | 1 |
| Loudoun United | 2020 | USL | 1 | 0 | — | | — | | — | | 1 | 0 |
| Loudoun United | 2022 | USL | 2 | 1 | — | | — | | — | | 2 | 1 |
| Loudoun United | Total | | 18 | 2 | — | | — | | — | | 18 | 2 |
| D.C. United | 2020 | MLS | 11 | 0 | — | | — | | — | | 11 | 0 |
| D.C. United | 2021 | MLS | 19 | 0 | — | | — | | — | | 19 | 0 |
| D.C. United | 2022 | MLS | 2 | 0 | — | | — | | — | | 2 | 0 |
| D.C. United | Total | | 32 | 0 | — | | — | | — | | 32 | 0 |
| Beveren | 2022–23 | Challenger Pro League | 0 | 0 | — | | — | | — | | 0 | 0 |
| Real Salt Lake (loan) | 2023 | MLS | 2 | 0 | — | | — | | — | | 2 | 0 |
| Real Monarchs (loan) | 2023 | MLS Next Pro | 16 | 1 | — | | — | | — | | 16 | 1 |
| Career total | | | 68 | 3 | 0 | 0 | 0 | 0 | 0 | 0 | 68 | 3 |
