= Adrien Perez (soccer) =

American soccer player (born 1995)

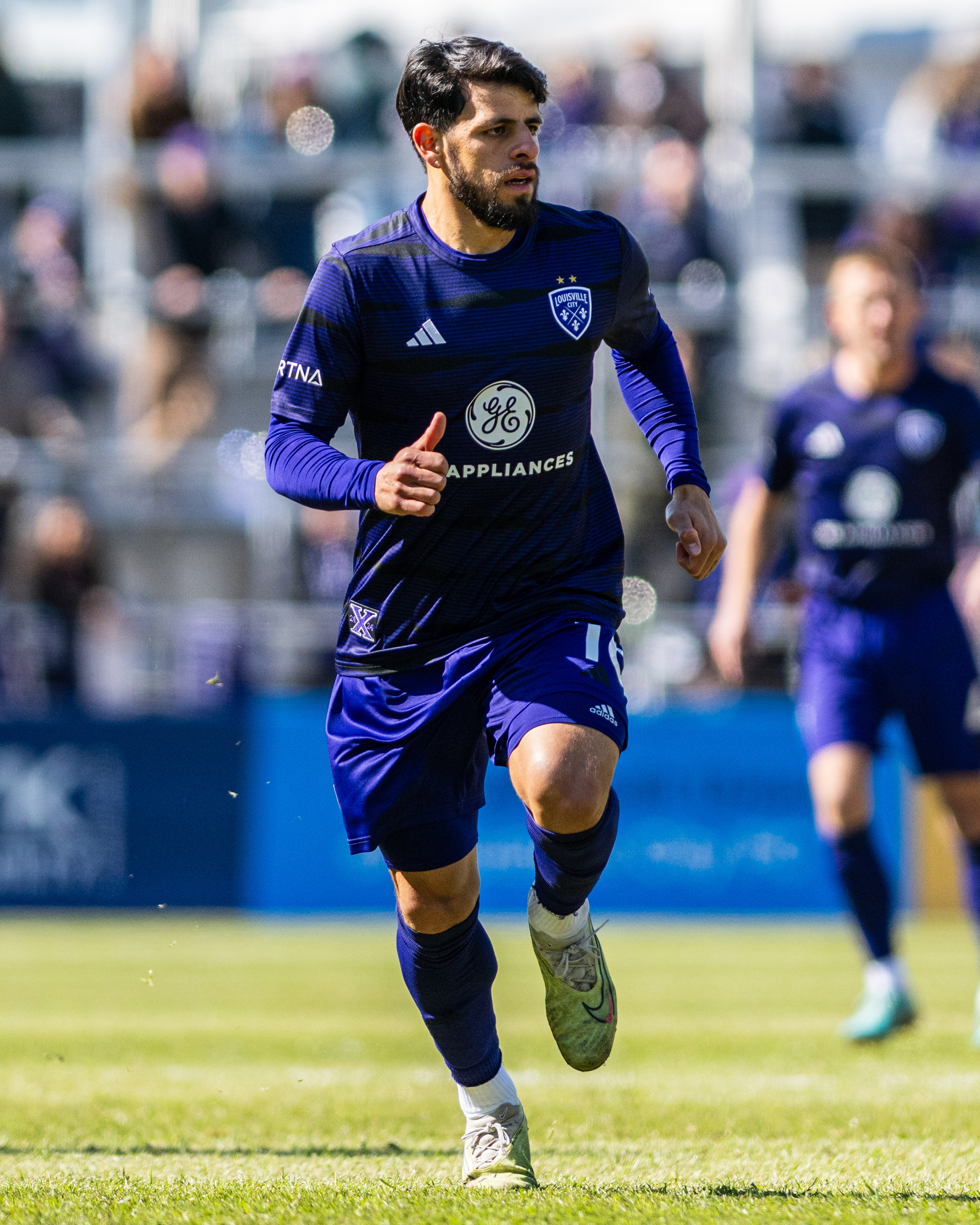
- Adrien Perez playing for Louisville City FC in 2024

Personal information
- Full name: Adrien Alfredo Perez
- Date of birth: October 13, 1995 (age 31)
- Place of birth: Los Angeles, California, United States
- Height: 1.84 m (6 ft 0 in)
- Position: Forward

Team information
- Current team: Colorado Springs Switchbacks
- Number: 10

College career
Years	Team	Apps	(Gls)
2013–2016	Loyola Marymount Lions	63	(21)

Senior career*
Years	Team	Apps	(Gls)
2014	Los Angeles Misioneros	1	(1)
2015	Portland Timbers U23s	6	(0)
2016	FC Golden State Force	4	(1)
2018	FC Golden State Force	3	(1)
2019–2020	Los Angeles FC	21	(1)
2021–2022	D.C. United	20	(0)
2023	San Diego Loyal	31	(10)
2024–2025	Louisville City	45	(5)
2026–	Colorado Springs Switchbacks	27	(6)
- * Club domestic league appearances and goals as of November 7, 2026

Adrien Alfredo Perez (born October 13, 1995) is an American professional soccer player who plays as a forward for USL Championship side Colorado Springs Switchbacks FC.

== Career ==
Perez spent two seasons in the Major Arena Soccer League for the Ontario Fury, where he was leading all MASL players in goals. He was called into LAFC training camp early in 2019, and in April 2019 he signed for Los Angeles FC in Major League Soccer. He was released by Los Angeles following their 2020 season.

Perez was selected by D.C. United in the 2020 MLS re-entry draft. He officially joined the club on January 6, 2021. In a match against the Philadelphia Union on July 17, 2021, Perez sustained a foot injury. Following the 2022 season, his contract option was declined by D.C. United.

On December 5, 2022, Perez returned to the Empire Strykers.

On February 28, 2023, Perez signed with USL Championship side San Diego Loyal.

On December 20, 2023, Perez signed with USL Championship club Louisville City FC. Following the end of the 2025 season, Perez was released by Louisville.

In January 2026, Perez signed a with Colorado Springs Switchbacks FC in the USL Championship through the 2027 season.

== Career statistics ==
=== Club ===
As of match played March 1, 2024

Appearances and goals by club, season and competition
Club	Season	League			National cup		Continental		Other		Total	
Club	Season	Division	Apps	Goals	Apps	Goals	Apps	Goals	Apps	Goals	Apps	Goals
FC Golden State Force	2016	USL PDL	4	1	—		—		—		4	1
FC Golden State Force	2018	USL PDL	3	1	1	0	—		—		4	1
FC Golden State Force	Total		7	2	1	0	—		—		8	2
Los Angeles FC	2019	MLS	12	1	—		—		1 (Note: Appearance(s) in MLS Cup Playoffs)	0	13	1
Los Angeles FC	2020	MLS	9	0	—		2 (Note: Appearance(s) in CONCACAF Champions League)	0	1	0	12	0
Los Angeles FC	Total		21	1	—		2	0	2	0	25	1
D.C. United	2021	MLS	17	0	—		—		—		17	0
D.C. United	2022	MLS	3	0	—		—		—		3	0
D.C. United	Total		20	0	0	0	0	0	0	0	20	0
San Diego Loyal	2023	USL	31	10	2	0	—		—		31	10
San Diego Loyal	Total		31	10	2	0	—		—		31	10
Career total			79	13	3	0	2	0	2	0	84	13
