= Nigel Robertha =

Dutch footballer (born 1998)

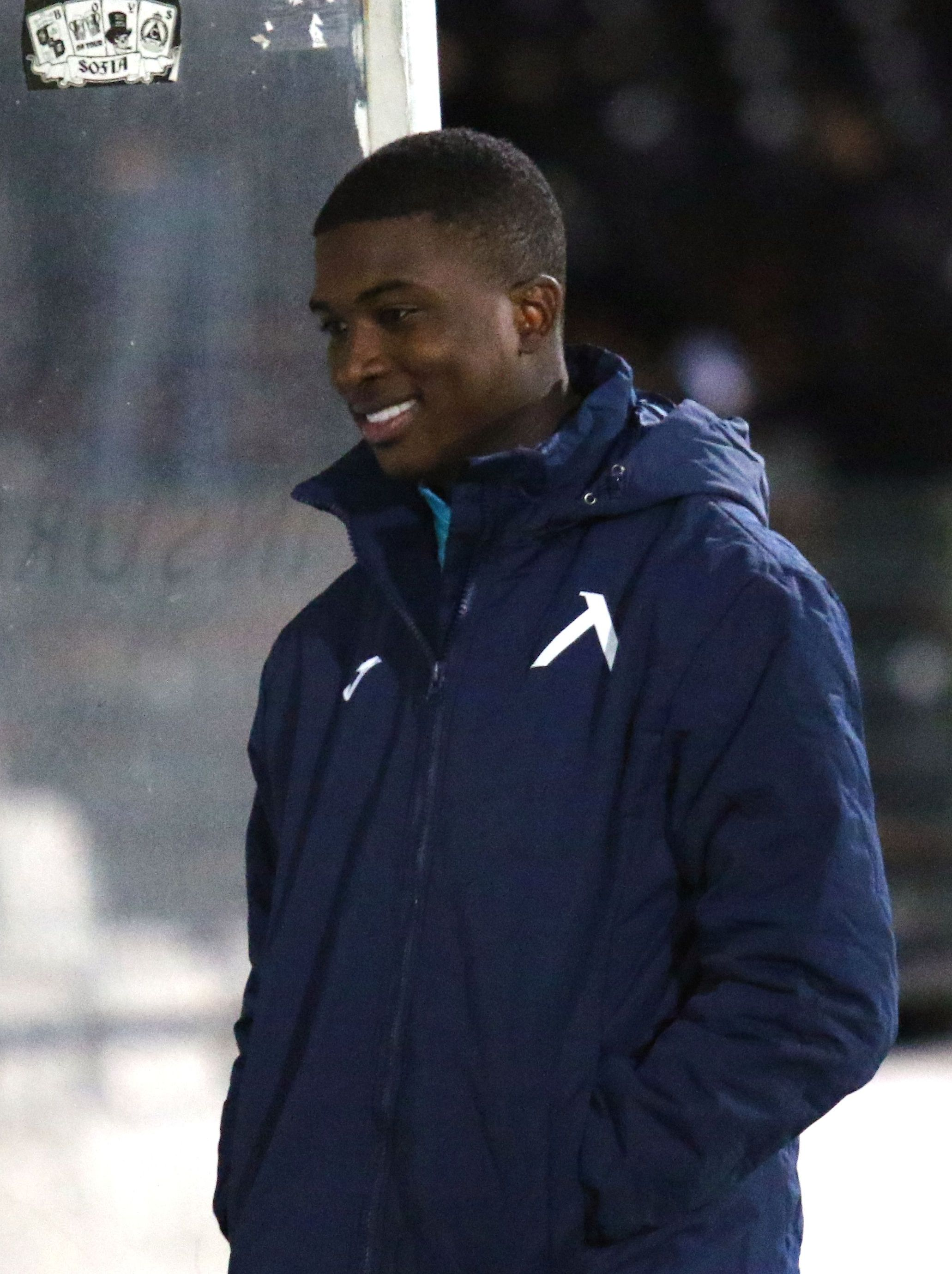
- Robertha with Levski Sofia

Personal information
- Full name: Nigel Benjamin Robertha
- Date of birth: 13 February 1998 (age 28)
- Place of birth: Vlaardingen, Netherlands
- Height: 1.85 m (6 ft 1 in)
- Position: Forward

Team information
- Current team: Sliema Wanderers
- Number: 9

Youth career
- –2009: EBOH
- 2009–2016: Feyenoord

Senior career*
Years	Team	Apps	(Gls)
2016–2017	Feyenoord	1	(0)
2017–2019	SC Cambuur	42	(12)
2019–2021	Levski Sofia	38	(17)
2021–2023	D.C. United	45	(6)
2024	Ittihad Kalba	2	(0)
2024	AEL Limassol	11	(1)
2025	Spartak Subotica	13	(4)
2026	Sliema Wanderers	3	(1)

International career
2013	Netherlands U15	2	(0)
2013–2014	Netherlands U16	5	(2)
2014–2016	Netherlands U17	12	(1)
2015–2016	Netherlands U18	3	(0)
- * Club domestic league appearances and goals as of 5 september 2026

Nigel Benjamin Robertha (born 13 February 1998) is a Dutch professional footballer who plays as a forward for Sliema Wanderers. He has represented the Netherlands at the under-17 and under-18 levels.

== Club career ==
=== Feyenoord ===
Having progressed through the academy at Feyenoord, Robertha was handed his first professional contract with the club on 25 June 2015. He made his senior debut on 1 May 2016, being brought on by manager Giovanni van Bronckhorst in the 71st minute to replace Anass Achahbar in a 1–0 Eredivisie win over Willem II. At the end of the season he featured in Feyenoord's 10–0 win over VV Lyra in an exhibition match, scoring his first goal for the club. On 8 July he was one of five youth players promoted to the senior squad permanently. He failed to make an appearance for the senior side the following season, however, due in part to a hamstring tear he suffered during the course of the campaign.

=== Cambuur ===
On 5 July 2017, Robertha signed a two-year deal with Eerste Divisie side Cambuur as a free agent. He made his debut for the club on 18 August, coming on as a substitute in a 2–1 loss to Ajax II. The following month, he netted his first competitive goal when he scored in a 5–1 KNVB Cup win over Helmond Sport. He scored his first league goals on 12 January 2018, netting a brace in a 3–2 win over De Graafschap.

=== Levski Sofia ===
On 24 July 2019, Robertha signed a three-year deal with Bulgarian First League side Levski Sofia. On 3 March 2021, he scored his first hattrick for the club in a 3–1 win over Beroe in the Round of 16 of the Bulgarian Cup.

=== D.C. United ===
On 25 March 2021, Robertha moved to MLS side D.C. United on a deal until 2023, with a club option for a further year. On 17 April 2021, Robertha made his debut in United's 2021 season opener against New York City, where his side won 2–1. On 27 June, Robertha scored his first goal for his new club, netting the opener in an eventual 2–1 loss to New York City.

=== Ittihad Kalba ===
In April 2024, Robertha moved to the United Arab Emirates, signing for Ittihad Kalba. He made two league appearances for the club.

=== AEL Limassol ===
In August 2024, Robertha joined Cypriot First Division club AEL Limassol. He made 11 league appearances and scored one goal for the club.

=== Spartak Subotica ===
On January 12, 2025, he joined Serbian club FK Spartak Subotica.

=== Sliema Wanderers ===
On 29 July 2026, Robertha signed for Maltese Premier League club Sliema Wanderers.

== International career ==
Born in the Netherlands, Robertha is a youth international for the country. In June 2021, he was called up to the preliminary squad for the Curaçao national team for the 2021 CONCACAF Gold Cup.

== Career statistics ==
=== Club ===
As of 24 December 2024

Appearances and goals by club, season and competition
Club	Season	League			National Cup		Continental		Other		Total	
Club	Season	League	Apps	Goals	Apps	Goals	Apps	Goals	Apps	Goals	Apps	Goals
Feyenoord	2015–16	Eredivisie	1	0	0	0	—		—		1	0
Feyenoord	2016–17	Eredivisie	0	0	0	0	—		0	0	0	0
Feyenoord	Total		1	0	0	0	—		0	0	1	0
Cambuur	2017–18	Eerste Divisie	12	5	4	2	—		1 (Note: Appearances in Eredivisie play-offs)	0	17	7
Cambuur	2018–19	Eerste Divisie	30	7	2	1	—		4	1	36	9
Cambuur	Total		42	12	6	3	—		5	1	53	16
Levski Sofia	2019–20	First League	19	11	4	0	1	0	—		24	11
Levski Sofia	2020–21	First League	19	6	2	3	—		—		21	9
Levski Sofia	Total		38	17	6	3	1	0	—		45	20
D.C. United	2021	MLS	18	4	—		—		—		18	4
D.C. United	2022	MLS	17	1	1	1	—		—		18	2
D.C. United	2023	MLS	10	1	1	0	—		—		11	1
D.C. United	Total		45	6	2	1	—		—		47	7
Kalba	2023–24	UAE Pro League	2	0	1	0	—		—		3	0
AEL Limassol	2024–25	Cypriot First Division	11	1	0	0	—		—		11	1
Career total			134	36	15	7	1	0	5	1	155	44
