= Brendan Hines-Ike =

American soccer player (born 1994)

Personal information
- Full name: Brendan Daniel Hines-Ike
- Date of birth: November 30, 1994 (age 31)
- Place of birth: Denver, Colorado, United States
- Height: 6 ft 1 in (1.85 m)
- Position: Defender

Team information
- Current team: Austin FC
- Number: 4

Youth career
- 2011–2012: Chivas USA

College career
Years	Team	Apps	(Gls)
2012–2014	Creighton Bluejays	50	(2)
2015	South Florida Bulls	20	(2)

Senior career*
Years	Team	Apps	(Gls)
2014	Ocean City Nor'easters	9	(1)
2016–2018	Örebro SK	59	(2)
2018–2021	KV Kortrijk	48	(1)
2021	→ D.C. United (loan)	13	(1)
2022–2023	D.C. United	32	(0)
2024–	Austin FC	85	(4)
- * Club domestic league appearances and goals as of 19:42, November 8, 2026 (UTC)

Brendan Daniel Hines-Ike (born November 30, 1994) is an American professional soccer player who plays as a defender for Major League Soccer club Austin FC.

== Youth and college ==
Hines-Ike started out playing as a forward when he was a kid. He played for his local club named Chivas Denver and credits many of his early successes to them. After playing for two more different clubs he was recruited to join his older brother in the youth ranks of Major League Soccer side Chivas USA. Hines-Ike played for the Chivas USA U-18 team from 2011 to 2012, as team captain he led the team with 25 matches started, playing the most minutes on the squad. Hines-Ike signed a pro deal after playing for Chivas USA youth academy and college thereafter.

Hines-Ike then went on to play in college where he spent three years with Creighton Bluejays going to one College Cup and one Elite Eight. Hines-Ike trained with MLS Club Chivas USA Reserves and first team during summer offseason as well as captained Chivas USA U-23 PDL team. Selected as one of two team captains to start the season at USF, the 21-year-old started all 20 games in his first and only season as a Bull. He was named to the American Athletic Conference First Team, recording two goals on the season. In 2013, he was also named to the All-Big East Second Team while at Creighton. From there he went on to play one season with South Florida Bulls before signing with Swedish Allsvenskan club Örebro SK before the start of the 2016 Allsvenskan season.

== Club career ==
=== Örebro SK ===
After signing a four-year contract with Örebro, Hines-Ike was drafted by the Montreal Impact in the third round of the 2016 MLS SuperDraft. Hines-Ike made his full professional debut in the Allsvenskan against Djurgården on April 3, 2016. Hines-Ike scored his first professional goal in the 69th minute in a 3:2 win against Hammarby IF. On October 2, 2016, Hines-Ike recorded his first professional assist in a loss against Djurgården.

=== K.V. Kortrijk ===
In July 2018, Hines-Ike was transferred to K.V. Kortrijk. The fee was reportedly set at $750,000, making it the biggest sale in the history of Örebro SK and biggest purchase of KV Kortrijk's. On August 25, 2018, Hines-Ike recorded his first Jupiler Pro League assist for K.V. Kortrijk in the 9th minute against RSC Charleroi. On September 2, 2018, Hines-Ike recorded his first multi-assist game against KRC Genk tallying two assists. On April 2, 2019, Hines-Ike recorded his first career Jupiler Pro League playoff goal scoring in the 57th minute against Waasland-Beveren.

=== D.C. United ===
On March 8, 2021, Hines-Ike joined Major League Soccer club D.C. United on loan for the 2021 season. In his MLS debut, Hines-Ike scored in the 2–1 win over New York City FC.

On January 4, 2022, D.C. United made Hines-Ike's move to the club permanent for around $800,000. He played for two seasons with D.C., before his contract option was declined following the 2023 season.

=== Austin FC ===
On February 14, 2024, Austin FC signed Hines-Ike as a free agent to a one-year deal, with an option for a second year. Hines-Ike played in 28 games scoring 2 goals and being named Austin FC’s 2024 Defender of the Year.

== International career ==
Hines-Ike played in five United States men's national under-18 soccer team training camps throughout the 2011–12 season. Hines-Ike is in the process of obtaining an Irish passport as his grandparents were Irish. The Football Association of Ireland are interested in him.

== Career statistics ==
As of match played November 7, 2026

Appearances and goals by club, season and competition
Club	Season	League			National cup (Note: Includes Svenska Cupen, Belgian Cup, U.S. Open Cup)		Continental		Other		Total	
Club	Season	Division	Apps	Goals	Apps	Goals	Apps	Goals	Apps	Goals	Apps	Goals
Örebro SK	2016	Allsvenskan	17	1	1	1	—		—		18	2
Örebro SK	2017	Allsvenskan	29	1	0	0	—		—		29	1
Örebro SK	2018	Allsvenskan	13	0	5	1	—		—		18	1
Örebro SK	Total		59	2	11	2	—		—		70	4
K.V. Kortrijk	2018–19	Belgian Pro League	25	1	3	0	—		—		28	1
K.V. Kortrijk	2019–20	Belgian Pro League	15	0	1	0	—		—		16	0
K.V. Kortrijk	2020–21	Belgian Pro League	8	0	1	0	—		—		9	0
K.V. Kortrijk	Total		48	1	5	0	—		—		53	1
D.C. United (loan)	2021	MLS	13	1	0	0	—		0	0	13	1
D.C. United	2022	MLS	20	0	0	0	—		0	0	20	0
D.C. United	2023	MLS	12	0	1	0	—		3 (Note: Appearances in Leagues Cup)	0	16	0
D.C. United	D.C. United total		45	1	1	0	—		3	0	49	1
Austin FC	2024	MLS	28	2	—		—		3	0	31	2
Austin FC	2025	MLS	31	0	4	0	—		2 (Note: Appearances in MLS Cup playoffs)	0	37	0
Austin FC	2026	MLS	26	2	1	0	—		4	0	31	2
Austin FC	Total		85	4	5	0	—		9	0	99	4
Career total			237	8	22	2	0	0	12	0	271	10
