= Capital Cup (soccer) =

The Capital Cup is a friendly association football tournament held in July hosted by Major League Soccer club D.C. United at their stadium Audi Field. It is contested by clubs from CONCACAF nations.

The inaugural tournament was held in 2021, but was only a two-legged aggregate series between two clubs, as two other teams withdrew due to the COVID-19 pandemic. The second edition featured three teams and utilized a round-robin format. D.C. United won both editions.

== 2021 ==
In the first year of the tournament, two of the four invitees—Alianza and Puebla—withdrew due to the COVID-19 pandemic.

2021 Capital Cup
Tournament details
- Host country: United States
- Dates: July 7–11
- Teams: 2 (from 2 countries)
- Venue(s): Audi Field; Washington, D.C.

Final positions
- Champions: (United States) D.C. United (1st title)
- Runners-up: (Costa Rica) Alajuelense

Tournament statistics
- Matches played: 2
- Goals scored: 2 (1 per match)
- Top scorer: Tied (1)

Pos	Team	Pld	W	D	L	GF	GA	GD	Pts	Qualification
1	(United States) D.C. United	2	2	0	0	2	0	+2	6	Champions
2	(Costa Rica) Alajuelense	2	0	0	2	0	2	−2	0	
3	(El Salvador) Alianza	0	0	0	0	0	0	0	0	Withdrew
4	(Mexico) Puebla	0	0	0	0	0	0	0	0	Withdrew

Source: NBC
July 7, 2021
20:30 EDT (UTC−4)

D.C. United (United States)	1–0	(Costa Rica) Alajuelense
Felipe 86'	Report

Audi Field, Washington
Attendance: 6,000
July 11, 2021
20:30 EDT (UTC−4)

Alajuelense (Costa Rica)	0–1	(United States) D.C. United
	Report	Bolívar 68'

Audi Field, Washington
Attendance: 5,000

== 2022 ==
2022 Capital Cup
Tournament details
- Host country: United States
- Dates: June 1–7
- Teams: 3 (from 3 countries)
- Venue(s): Audi Field; Washington, D.C.

Final positions
- Champions: (United States) D.C. United (2nd title)
- Runners-up: (Guatemala) Xelajú

Tournament statistics
- Matches played: 3
- Goals scored: 4 (1.33 per match)
- Top scorer: (United States) Sami Guediri (2 goals)

Pos	Team	Pld	W	D	L	GF	GA	GD	Pts	Qualification
1	(United States) D.C. United	2	1	1	0	0	0	0	4	Champions
2	(Guatemala) Xelajú	2	1	0	1	0	0	0	3	
3	(El Salvador) Águila	2	0	1	1	0	0	0	1	

Source: DCUnited.com
June 1, 2022

D.C. United (United States)	1–1	(El Salvador) Águila
Guediri 82'		Medrano 31'

Audi Field, Washington
June 4, 2022

Águila (El Salvador)	0–1	(Guatemala) Xelajú
		Cardoza 53'

Audi Field, Washington
June 7, 2022

Xelajú (Guatemala)	0–1	(United States) D.C. United
		Guediri 16'

Audi Field, Washington
