= Griffin Yow =

American soccer player (born 2002)

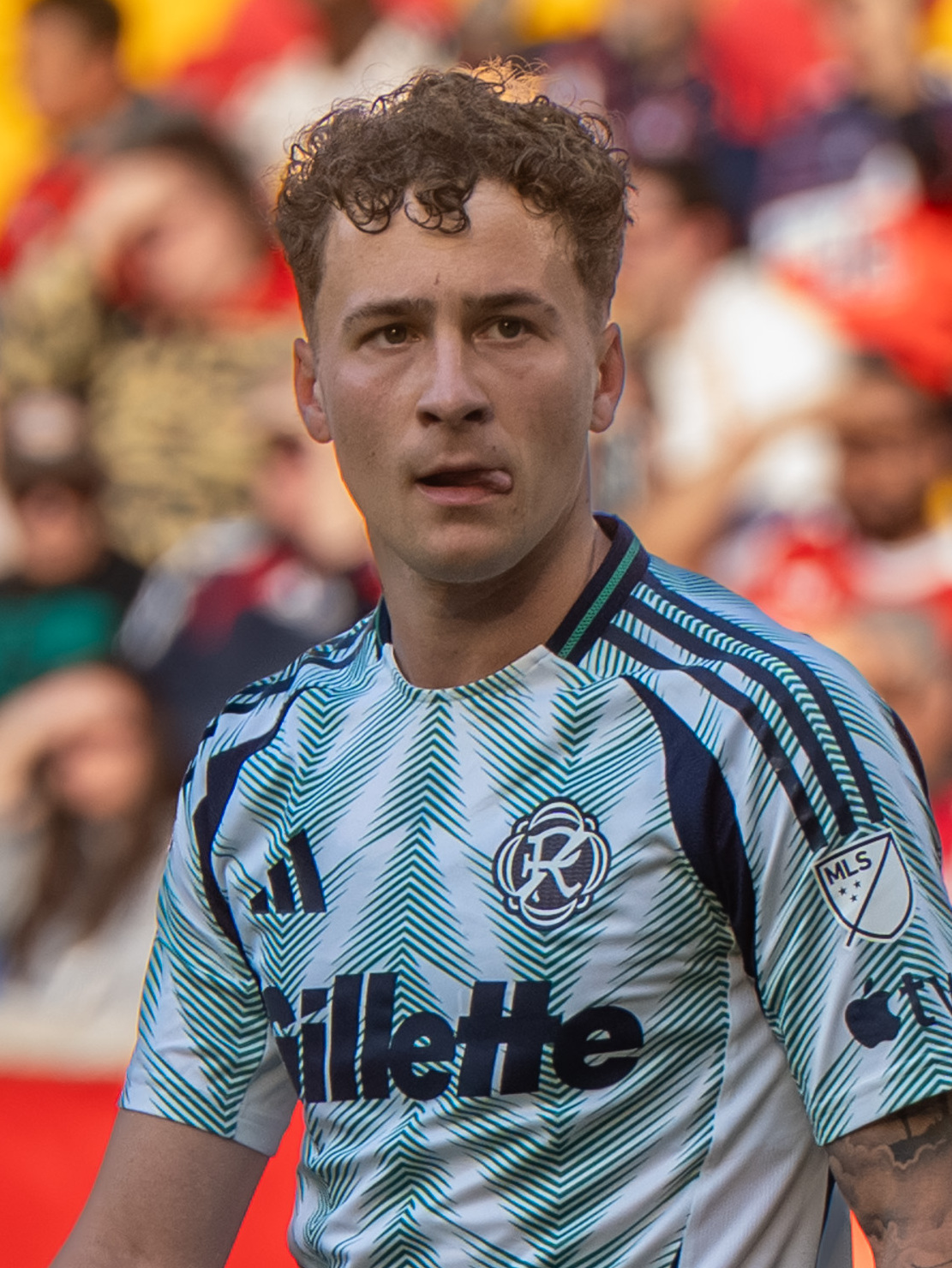
- Yow with the New England Revolution in 2026

Personal information
- Full name: Griffin McDorman Yow
- Date of birth: September 25, 2002 (age 24)
- Place of birth: Clifton, Virginia, United States
- Height: 5 ft 9 in (1.75 m)
- Position: Winger

Team information
- Current team: New England Revolution
- Number: 7

Youth career
- 2016–2017: Virginia Development Academy
- 2017–2019: D.C. United

Senior career*
Years	Team	Apps	(Gls)
2019–2022	Loudoun United	18	(3)
2019–2022	D.C. United	32	(3)
2022–2026	Westerlo	82	(18)
2026–	New England Revolution	14	(1)

International career^{‡}
2018–2019	United States U17	12	(7)
2024	United States U23	7	(1)
- * Club domestic league appearances and goals as of July 23, 2026 ‡ National team caps and goals as of August 2, 2024

Griffin McDorman Yow (born September 25, 2002) is an American professional soccer player who plays as a winger for Major League Soccer club New England Revolution.

== Club career ==
=== D.C. United ===
Yow joined the D.C. United academy in 2017 and found himself engaging in training sessions with the first team at the age of 15. By 2019, Yow had withdrawn from high school and enrolled in online programs, electing to forego a collegiate soccer career in favor of professional opportunities in the sport.

Shortly thereafter, Yow made his professional debut with the club's USL Championship affiliate Loudoun United, and the following week scored the first goal in club history against Memphis 901 FC.

On March 19, 2019, he became the 12th homegrown player to be signed with D.C. United. Yow made his professional debut with D.C. United in the 90th minute replacing Paul Arriola against New York City FC on April 21, 2019. This cameo made him the youngest player to appear in Major League Soccer during the 2019 season.

Yow scored his first non-competitive goal for D.C. United in a friendly against Real Betis on May 22, 2019, on an assist from Wayne Rooney. Yow made his first start with D.C. United on July 4, 2019, against FC Dallas, playing 58 minutes in a 0–2 loss. On September 19, 2020, Yow scored his first Major League Soccer goal against Toronto FC, equalizing the game 2–2.

Following his departure from the club, Yow stated that he "didn't feel valued" at times during his stint with the team, owing to a lack of minutes and perceived on-field progress. Yow made no more than a dozen league appearances in any of his four seasons with the club between 2019 and 2022.

=== Westerlo ===
On July 4, 2022, Yow was sold by D.C. United to recently promoted Westerlo. After a quiet season in which he made just five league appearances, Yow broke into the starting eleven in October 2023 after a knee injury forced him to miss the start of the 2023–24 campaign.

He enjoyed a hot start to the season, scoring three goals and tallying two assists in his first 10 games. At the end of the year, Yow had registered 29 appearances across all competitions, scoring seven times.

=== New England Revolution ===
On January 20, 2026, Yow signed with the New England Revolution of Major League Soccer, re-joining his former coach Marko Mitrović. On March 16, 2026, Yow scored his first goal for New England against FC Cincinnati in their 6–1 win.

== International career ==
Yow has appeared for the United States under-17 team, scoring his first goal against Brazil's under-17 team in a friendly tournament. In October 2019, he was named to the squad for the 2019 FIFA U-17 World Cup in Brazil.

In March 2024, Yow was called up to the United States under-23 team ahead of friendlies against Guinea and France. That summer, Yow was selected to play in the 2024 Summer Olympics, appearing in all of the team's group stage matches as well as their 4–0 loss to Morocco in the quarterfinals.

== Career statistics ==
=== Club ===
As of match played April 11, 2025

Appearances and goals by club, season and competition
Club	Season	League			National cup (Note: Includes U.S. Open Cup, Belgian Cup)		Continental		Other		Total	
Club	Season	Division	Apps	Goals	Apps	Goals	Apps	Goals	Apps	Goals	Apps	Goals
Loudoun United	2019	USL	15	3	—		—		—		15	3
Loudoun United	2021	USL	1	0	—		—		—		1	0
Loudoun United	2022	USL	2	0	—		—		—		2	0
Loudoun United	Total		18	3	—		—		—		18	3
D.C. United	2019	MLS	2	0	2	0	—		—		4	0
D.C. United	2020	MLS	12	2	—		—		—		12	2
D.C. United	2021	MLS	11	1	—		—		—		11	1
D.C. United	2022	MLS	7	0	2	0	—		—		9	0
D.C. United	Total		32	3	4	0	—		—		36	3
Westerlo	2022–23	Belgian Pro League	5	0	—		—		—		5	0
Westerlo	2023–24	Belgian Pro League	28	7	1	0	—		—		29	7
Westerlo	2024–25	Belgian Pro League	27	6	2	0	—		—		29	6
Westerlo	Total		60	13	3	0	—		—		63	13
New England Revolution	2026	Major League Soccer	3	1	—		—		—		3	1
New England Revolution	Total		3	1	—	—	—		—		3	1
New England Revolution	Career total		113	20	7	0	0	0	0	0	117	19
