= Júnior Moreno =

Venezuelan footballer (born 1993)

Junior Moreno
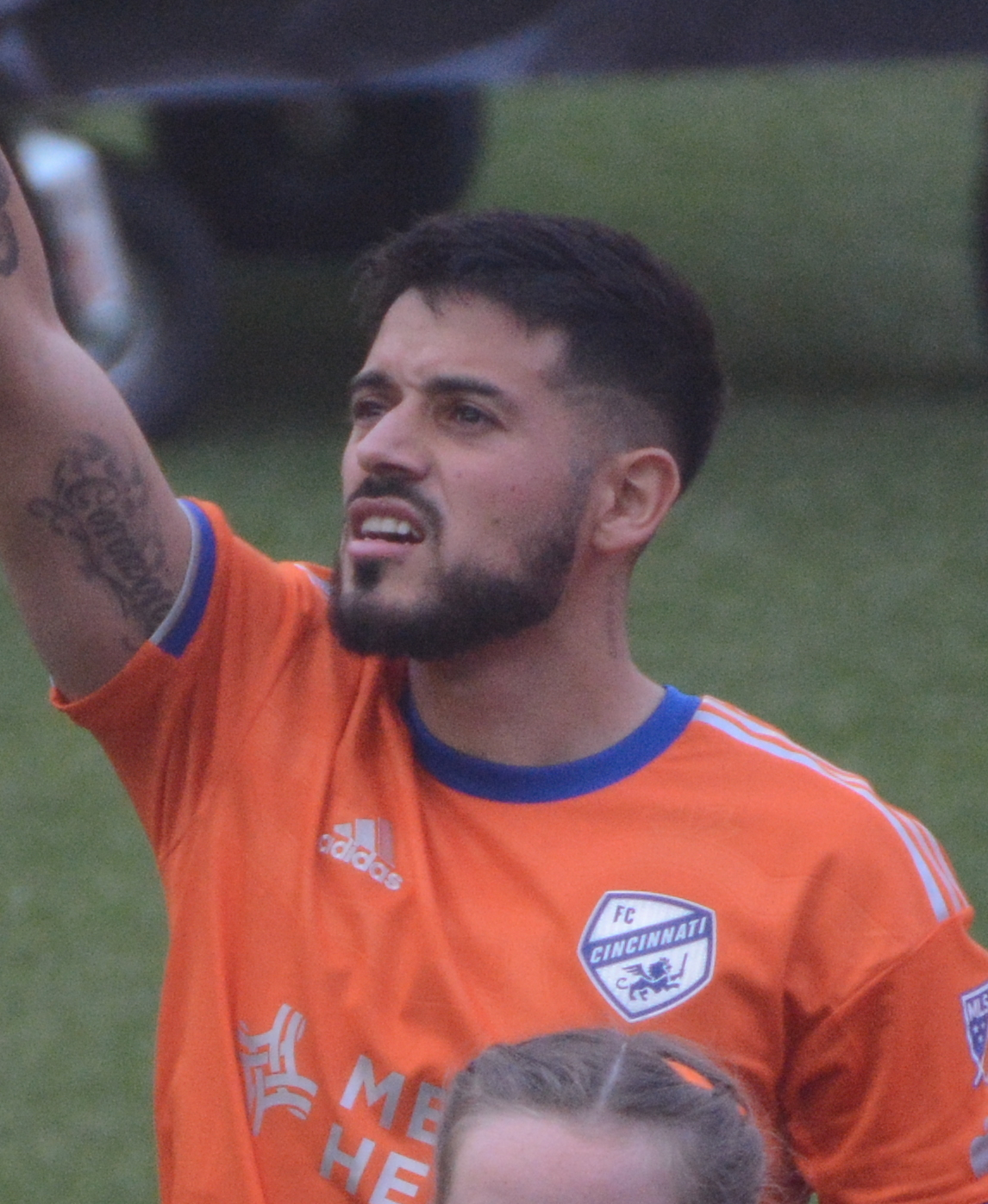
- Moreno with FC Cincinnati in 2023

Personal information
- Full name: Junior Leonardo Moreno Borrero
- Date of birth: 20 July 1993 (age 33)
- Place of birth: San Cristóbal, Venezuela
- Height: 1.75 m (5 ft 9 in)
- Position: Midfielder

Team information
- Current team: Academia Puerto Cabello

Senior career*
Years	Team	Apps	(Gls)
2012–2015	Deportivo Lara	43	(1)
2015–2017	Zulia	94	(4)
2018–2021	D.C. United	98	(1)
2022–2023	FC Cincinnati	56	(6)
2024	Al-Hazem	14	(0)
2024	Houston Dynamo	2	(0)
2025	Gimnasia LP	3	(0)
2026-	Academia Puerto Cabello	1	(0)

International career^{‡}
2017–	Venezuela	40	(1)
- * Club domestic league appearances and goals as of 17:56, 5 February 2025 (UTC) ‡ National team caps and goals as of 20:48, 22 November 2023 (UTC)

Junior Leonardo Moreno Borrero (born 20 July 1993), is a Venezuelan professional footballer as a midfielder who plays for Academia Puerto Cabello.

== Professional career ==
=== Zulia FC ===
In June 2015, Moreno moved to Zulia FC from ACD Lara after a couple successful seasons Moreno won the 2016 Copa Venezuela with Zulia. He was team captain for Zulia during his last season.

=== D.C. United ===
On 2 January 2018, Moreno signed with MLS side D.C. United. Moreno debuted for United on 3 March 2018, in a 1–1 tie against Orlando City. Moreno played 20 games and contributed 2 assists for United in 2018. Statistically, Moreno is considered one of the best defensive midfielders in MLS. Moreno finished his 2019 season with 29 appearances, which he started in all of them, and provided 3 assists.

Moreno scored his first MLS goal in the 85th minute of the 3–1 win over Minnesota United on 29 September 2021.

=== FC Cincinnati ===
On 25 February 2022, FC Cincinnati signed Moreno for the 2022 MLS season with an option for 2023.

=== Al-Hazem ===
On 10 February 2024, Moreno joined Saudi Pro League club Al-Hazem on a free transfer.

=== Houston Dynamo ===
On 17 September 2024, Moreno returned to the United States, joining MLS side Houston Dynamo on a three month deal. On 7 November 2024, his contract option was declined by Houston following their 2024 season.

=== Gimnasia LP ===
On 27 January 2025, Moreno joined Argentine Primera División side Gimnasia LP, signing a contract until the end of the year.

== International career ==
Moreno was born in Venezuela, and is of Argentine descent. Moreno made his debut for the Venezuela national football team in a friendly 1–1 draw with the United States, wherein he assisted Venezuela's goal. Moreno played in the 2019 Copa América for Venezuela.

== Career statistics ==
=== Club ===
As of match played 2 December 2023

Appearances and goals by club, season and competition
Club	Season	League			National cup (Note: Appearance(s) in Copa Venezuela and U.S. Open Cup)		Continental		Other		Total	
Club	Season	Division	Apps	Goals	Apps	Goals	Apps	Goals	Apps	Goals	Apps	Goals
ACD Lara	2012–13	Venezuelan Primera División	8	0	—		—		—		6	0
ACD Lara	2013–14	Venezuelan Primera División	6	0	—		1 (Note: Appearance(s) in Copa Libertadores)	0	—		7	0
ACD Lara	2014–15	Venezuelan Primera División	29	1	—		—		—		29	1
ACD Lara	Total		43	1	0	0	1	0	0	0	44	1
Zulia	2015	Venezuelan Primera División	21	1	—		—		—		21	1
Zulia	2016	Venezuelan Primera División	43	1	7	1	—		—		50	2
Zulia	2017	Venezuelan Primera División	30	2	2	0	6	0	—		38	2
Zulia	Total		94	4	9	1	6	0	0	0	109	5
D.C. United	2018	MLS	20	0	2	0	—		1 (Note: Appearance(s) in MLS Cup Playoffs)	0	23	0
D.C. United	2019	MLS	29	0	—		—		1	0	30	0
D.C. United	2020	MLS	20	0	—		—		—		20	0
D.C. United	2021	MLS	29	1	—		—		—		29	1
Total			98	1	2	0	0	0	2	0	102	1
FC Cincinnati	2022	MLS	27	2	2	0	1 (Note: Appearance(s) in Leagues Cup)	0	2	0	23	0
FC Cincinnati	2023	MLS	29	4	4	0	3	0	4	0	30	0
Total			56	6	6	0	4	0	6	0	72	6
Career total			291	12	17	1	11	0	8	0	327	13

=== International ===
As of match played 22 November 2023

Appearances and goals by national team and year
National team	Year	Apps	Goals
Venezuela	2017	5	1
Venezuela	2018	5	0
Venezuela	2019	10	0
Venezuela	2020	2	0
Venezuela	2021	12	0
Venezuela	2022	1	0
Venezuela	2023	5	0
Total		40	1

=== International goals ===
Scores and results list Moreno's goal tally first.

No	Date	Venue	Opponent	Score	Result	Competition
1.	8 June 2017	FAU Stadium, Boca Raton, United States	Ecuador	1–1	1–1	Friendly

== Honours ==
Zulia F.C.

- Venezuelan Primera División
  - Runners-up: (2016)
  - Torneo Clausura: (2016)
- Copa Venezuela: 2016

FC Cincinnati

- Supporters' Shield: 2023

== Personal life ==
Moreno's father, Carlos Horacio Moreno, is an Argentine former footballer and coach, and his brothers Carlos Moreno and Marcelo Moreno are also footballers. In January 2020, Moreno received his green card.
