= Dave Kasper =

American soccer player

Personal information
- Place of birth: Bridgeville, Pennsylvania, U.S.
- Positions: Forward; midfielder

Youth career
- Pittsburgh Beadling

College career
Years	Team	Apps	(Gls)
1983–1987	Maryland Terrapins		

Senior career*
Years	Team	Apps	(Gls)
1988–1990	Milwaukee Wave (indoor)	50	(8)
1994	Pittsburgh Stingers (indoor)	18	(7)

Managerial career
- 1995–1997: Duquesne Dukes
- * Club domestic league appearances and goals

Dave Kasper is an American retired soccer player and former sporting director for D.C. United. Kasper worked with D.C. United in their front office from late 2001 to late 2023 in various capacities.

== Playing career ==
Kasper grew up in the Pittsburgh area playing for Pittsburgh Beadling. He graduated from Chartiers Valley High School. He attended the University of Maryland, playing for the Terrapins soccer team from 1983 to 1987. He graduated with a bachelor's degree in marketing. In 1988, the Los Angeles Lazers selected Kasper in the Major Indoor Soccer League draft, but did not sign him. He turned professional that year with the Milwaukee Wave of the American Indoor Soccer Association. He spent two seasons with the Wave. In 1994, Kasper signed with the expansion Pittsburgh Stingers of the Continental Indoor Soccer League. The Stingers released him on June 29, 1995.

== Coaching career ==
Kasper coached the Upper St. Clair High School boys team. He also coached the Sewickley Academy soccer team from 1991 to 1994, compiling a 38–17–3 record. He also coached the Beadling U-17 team. In April 1994, Duquesne University hired him as the school's first soccer coach. However, the team did not play its first season until 1995. He had a 15–31–7 record over three seasons.

== Executive career ==
On March 16, 1998, Kasper became the vice-president and general manager of the Pittsburgh Riverhounds. In January 2001, Kasper became the director of business development for the New England Revolution of Major League Soccer. On December 20, 2001, D.C. United hired Kasper as the team's technical director. He remained in that position until September 20, 2007, when he became D.C. United's general manager.

Kasper remained the club's general manager until April 14, 2021, when he was promoted to sporting director, while Lucy Rushton was named general manager. In 2023, Kasper was relived of his sporting director duties, but remained with the club as a senior consultant.
