= Felipe Martins (footballer, born November 1990) =

Brazilian footballer

Personal information
- Full name: Felipe Santos Martins
- Date of birth: 12 November 1990 (age 35)
- Place of birth: Guarulhos, Brazil
- Height: 1.85 m (6 ft 1 in)
- Position: Striker

Senior career*
Years	Team	Apps	(Gls)
2010	Campo Mourão		
2011–2014	Alcanenense	28	(4)
2011–2012	→ União de Leiria (loan)	21	(1)
2014–2015	Vila Real	25	(14)
2015–2016	Desportivo Aves	25	(1)
2016–2018	Vizela	6	(1)
2018	PSMS Medan	16	(4)
2019	Hoang Anh Gia Lai	10	(3)
2019	PSMS Medan	0	(0)
2020–2021	Song Lam Nghe An	9	(3)
- * Club domestic league appearances and goals as of 6 July 2019

Felipe Santos Martins (born 12 November 1990) is a Brazilian football player who last played for Song Lam Nghe An.

== Club career ==
He made his professional debut in the Segunda Liga for Desportivo Aves on 8 August 2015 in a game against Sporting Covilhã.
