= Kimarni Smith =

English footballer

Personal information
- Date of birth: 14 March 1998 (age 28)
- Place of birth: Nottingham, England
- Height: 6 ft 1 in (1.85 m)
- Position: Forward

Youth career
- –2014: Basford United

College career
Years	Team	Apps	(Gls)
2018–2020	Clemson Tigers	63	(26)

Senior career*
Years	Team	Apps	(Gls)
2014–2016	Basford United		
2016–2018	Sheffield United	0	(0)
2017	→ Gainsborough Trinity (loan)	2	(0)
2019	Greenville FC	6	(1)
2021–2022	D.C. United	20	(1)
2021–2022	→ Loudoun United (loan)	29	(3)
2023	San Antonio FC	10	(0)
2023	Crown Legacy FC	8	(0)
2024	Spokane Velocity	19	(0)
2025	One Knoxville	15	(0)
- * Club domestic league appearances and goals as of 20:15, 1 November 2025 (UTC)

Kimarni Smith (born 14 March 1998) is an English footballer.

== Career ==
=== Basford United ===
Smith played with the Nottingham-based Southern Football League side Basford United's academy as a youngster, as well as appearing for the club's first team during their 2014–15 season.

=== Sheffield United ===
Ahead of a 1 January 2016 move, Smith signed a professional contract with Sheffield United on 6 December 2015. Whilst with Sheffield United, Smith had a brief loan stint with National League North side Gainsborough Trinity in January 2017.

=== College & amateur ===
Following his release from Sheffield United in the summer of 2018, Smith moved to the United States to play college soccer at Clemson University. Whilst at Clemson, Smith scored 26 goals and tallied 11 assists in 63 appearances for the Tigers. Honours earned at Clemson included Second-team All-America, First-team All-South Region, and First-team All-ACC in 2019, and First-team All-ACC in 2020.

During the 2019 season, Smith also played with National Premier Soccer League side Greenville FC, making six appearances and scoring a single goal.

=== D.C. United ===
On 21 January 2021, Smith was selected 4th overall in the 2021 MLS SuperDraft by D.C. United. He officially signed with the club on 8 March 2021. He made his debut on 24 April 2021, appearing as a 70th-minute substitute in a 1–0 loss to New England Revolution.

On 25 June 2021, Smith was loaned to D.C. United's USL Championship affiliate side Loudoun United. Following the 2022 season, his contract option was declined by D.C. United.

== Possible return to the UK with Radford FC ==
Kimarni played as a trialist for United Counties North side Radford, during July 2026, sparking speculation that he is returning to the United Kingdom and his home city of Nottingham.
