= Sami Guediri =

American soccer player (born 1997)

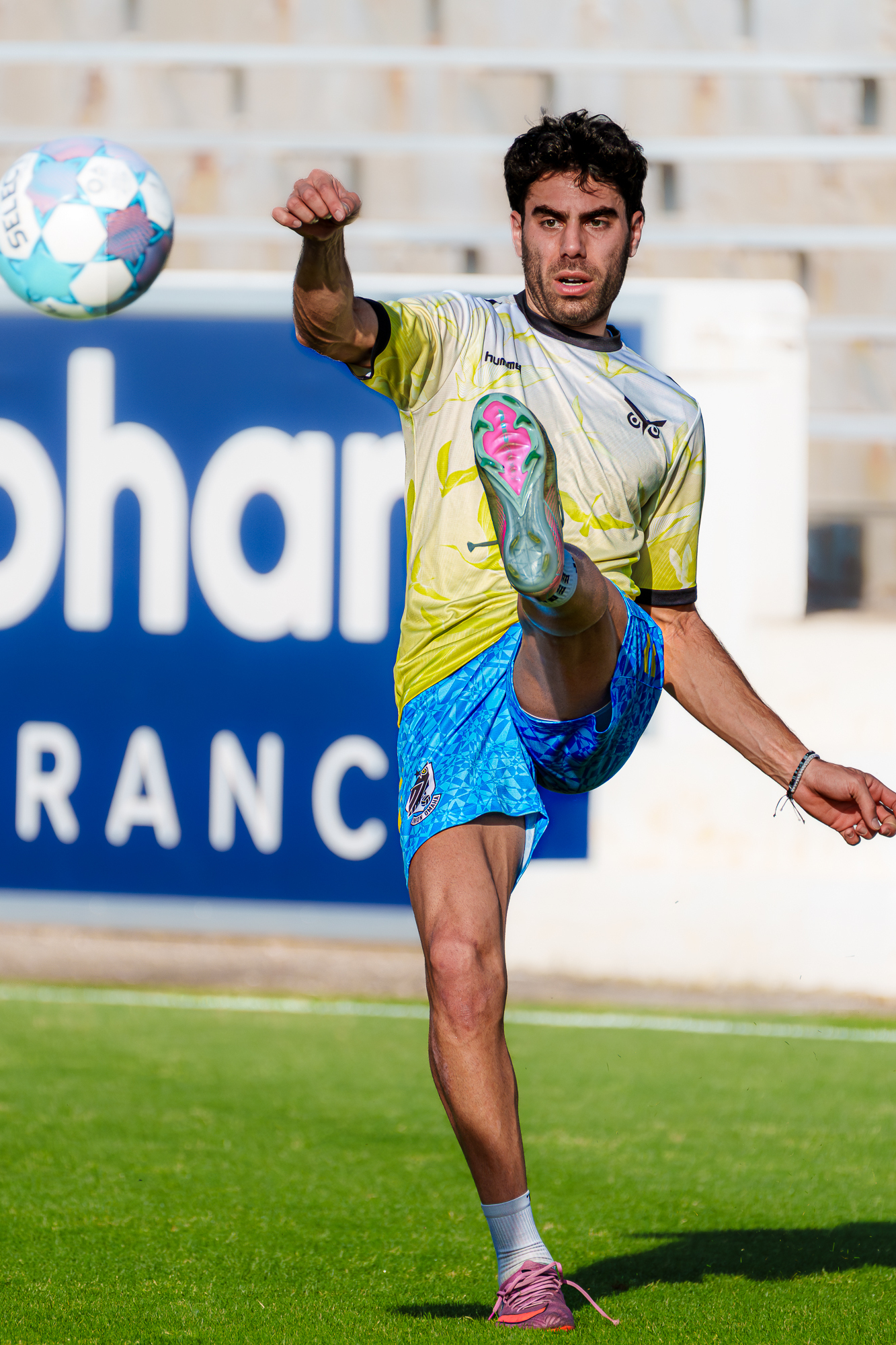
- Guediri with Union Omaha in 2026

Personal information
- Full name: Sami Guediri
- Date of birth: August 18, 1997 (age 29)
- Place of birth: Boca Raton, Florida, United States
- Height: 5 ft 11 in (1.80 m)
- Positions: Defender; defensive midfielder

Team information
- Current team: Union Omaha
- Number: 6

Senior career*
Years	Team	Apps	(Gls)
2017	VfL Alfter	1	(0)
2018	SIMA Águilas	11	(1)
2019	Greenville Triumph	17	(0)
2020–2021	Fort Lauderdale CF	18	(0)
2021	Inter Miami	10	(0)
2022	Loudoun United	9	(1)
2022	→ D.C. United (loan)	3	(0)
2022	D.C. United	10	(0)
2022	→ Loudoun United (loan)	4	(1)
2023–2024	ES Sétif	20	(0)
2025	Monterey Bay FC	16	(0)
2026–	Union Omaha	27	(0)
- * Club domestic league appearances and goals as of October 31, 2026

Sami Guediri (Arabic: سامي غديري; born 18 August 1997) is an American professional soccer player who plays as a midfielder for Union Omaha in USL League One.

== Club career ==
In 2023, he joined ES Sétif. Guediri departed Monterey Bay FC as a free agent following the 2025 season.

== Personal life ==
Guediri was born in the United States to Algerian-American father and American mother.
