= José Alfaro (footballer) =

Costa Rican football player (born 2000)

Personal information
- Full name: José Rodolfo Alfaro Vargas
- Date of birth: 18 March 2000 (age 26)
- Place of birth: Grecia, Grecia, Costa Rica
- Height: 1.73 m (5 ft 8 in)
- Position: Midfielder

Team information
- Current team: Pérez Zeledón

Youth career
- Carmelita

Senior career*
Years	Team	Apps	(Gls)
2016–2021	Carmelita	27	(1)
2019–2020	→ Saprissa (loan)	16	(5)
2020–2021	→ Grecia	10	(1)
2022–2023	Escorpiones de Belén		
2023	→ Guadalupe (loan)	10	(0)
2023-	Pérez Zeledón	1	(0)

International career
2019–	Costa Rica	1	(0)
- * Club domestic league appearances and goals as of 19:49, 3 October 2023 (UTC)

José Rodolfo Alfaro Vargas (born 18 March 2000) is a Costa Rican professional footballer who plays as a midfielder for Pérez Zeledón.

== Career ==
Alfaro made his league debut for A.D. Carmelita on 5 March 2017 against Saprissa appearing as a substitute as a 16-year-old. 2 years later he joined Saprissa on loan following Carmelita's relegation with the deal going through on 3 June 2019. He made his debut for Saprissa on 20 July 2019 against the defending champions A.D. San Carlos. He scored for his first goal for Saprissa in October 2019 in a 6–0 win over Limón F.C. He was part of the team that triumphed in the 2019 CONCACAF League winning the final against F.C. Motagua of Honduras. He signed for Guadalupe F.C. in December 2022.

== International career ==
Alfaro made his debut for the senior Costa Rica national team at the Avaya Stadium on 2 February 2019 against the United States.
