= Tony Alfaro =

Mexican footballer (born 1993)

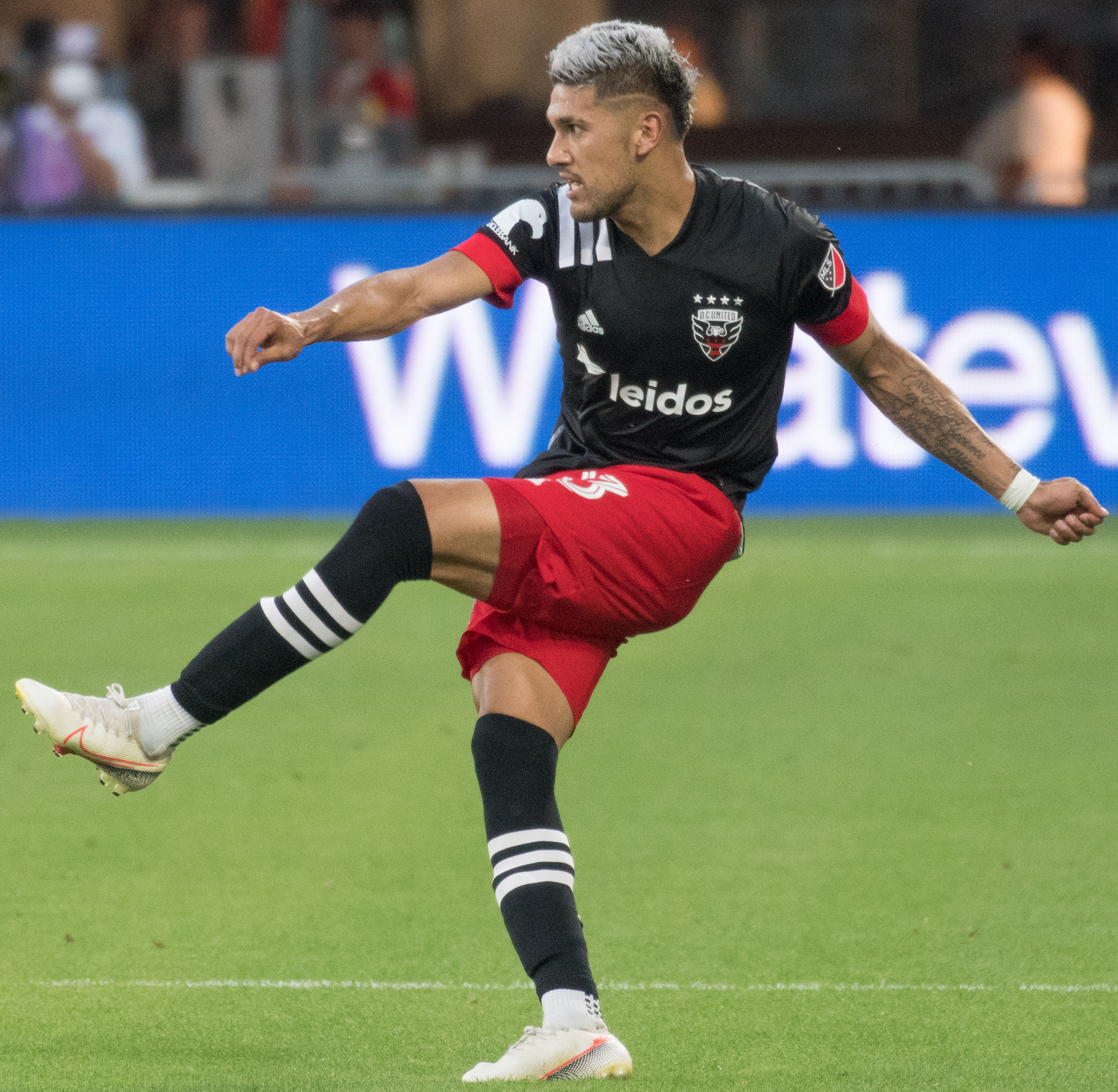
- Alfaro with D.C. United in 2021

Personal information
- Full name: José Antonio Alfaro Vázquez
- Date of birth: 15 June 1993 (age 33)
- Place of birth: Puruándiro, Michoacán, Mexico
- Height: 1.88 m (6 ft 2 in)
- Position: Defender

Team information
- Current team: El Paso Locomotive
- Number: 93

College career
Years	Team	Apps	(Gls)
2011–2015	Cal State Dominguez Hills Toros	75	(10)

Senior career*
Years	Team	Apps	(Gls)
2014	Ventura County Fusion	10	(3)
2016–2018	Seattle Sounders FC	25	(0)
2016–2018	→ Seattle Sounders 2 (loan)	37	(2)
2019	Guadalajara	1	(0)
2019	→ Zacatepec (loan)	11	(0)
2020	Reno 1868	10	(0)
2021–2022	D.C. United	43	(1)
2022–2023	New York City	6	(0)
2023	LA Galaxy	6	(0)
2024–	El Paso Locomotive	68	(2)
- * Club domestic league appearances and goals as of 21:08, 8 November 2026 (UTC)

José Antonio "Tony" Alfaro Vázquez (born 15 June 1993) is a Mexican professional footballer who plays as a defender for USL Championship club El Paso Locomotive.

== Early career ==
Alfaro spent his entire college career at California State University, Dominguez Hills. He made a total of 75 appearances for the Toros and tallied 10 goals and six assists.

He also played in the Premier Development League for Ventura County Fusion.

== Professional career ==
=== Seattle Sounders ===
On 14 January 2016, Alfaro was selected in the second round (27th overall) of the 2016 MLS SuperDraft by Seattle Sounders FC. He signed a professional contract with the club two months later.

On 25 March 2016, Alfaro made his professional debut for USL affiliate club Seattle Sounders FC 2 in a match against Sacramento Republic and conceded a penalty in the 62nd minute. Sacramento would convert their PK and win 1–0.

On 28 May 2016, Alfaro made his first-team debut for Seattle Sounders FC as a substitute for injured captain Brad Evans in the team's 1–2 loss against the New England Revolution.

On 4 March 2018, Alfaro received a red card in the 83rd minute, as the Sounders lost its opening game of the 2018 season 1–0 to recent expansion team Los Angeles.

=== Guadalajara ===
In December 2018, Alfaro passed a trial with C.D. Guadalajara and was signed as a free agent. He spent time on loan with Zacatepec in 2019.

=== Reno 1868 ===
On 31 January 2020, Alfaro signed with USL Championship side Reno 1868 FC. Reno folded their team on November 6, 2020, due to the financial impact of the COVID-19 pandemic.

=== D.C. United ===
On 16 April 2021, Alfaro returned to Major League Soccer, signing with D.C. United. The next day, Alfaro debuted for the team in the 2–1 win over New York City. Alfaro scored his first MLS career goal on 1 May 2021, in a 1–4 loss against the San Jose Earthquakes. Following the 2022 season, his contract option was declined by D.C. United.

=== New York City FC ===
On 22 December 2022, Alfaro signed a contract through 2023, with an option to extend for the 2024 Major League Soccer season with New York City.

=== LA Galaxy ===
Alfaro was traded to MLS side LA Galaxy on 11 July 2023 in exchange for $125,000 of General Allocation Money.

=== El Paso Locomotive FC ===
Alfaro signed with USL Championship club El Paso Locomotive on 15 December 2023.

== Honours ==
Seattle Sounders FC

- MLS Cup: 2016
