= Jovanny Bolívar =

Venezuelan footballer (born 2001)

Personal information
- Full name: Jovanny David Bolívar Alvarado
- Date of birth: 16 December 2001 (age 24)
- Place of birth: Acarigua, Venezuela
- Height: 1.76 m (5 ft 9 1/2 in)
- Position: Forward

Team information
- Current team: Kalamata (on loan from Albacete)
- Number: 9

Youth career
- Deportivo La Guaira

Senior career*
Years	Team	Apps	(Gls)
2019–2022	Deportivo La Guaira	62	(22)
2021	→ D.C. United (loan)	0	(0)
2021	→ Loudoun United (loan)	19	(6)
2023–	Albacete	9	(1)
2023–2024	→ Huesca (loan)	19	(0)
2024–2025	→ Kolos Kovalivka (loan)	20	(3)
2025	→ La Equidad (loan)	14	(1)
2026	→ Universidad Central (loan)	15	(7)
2026–	→ Kalamata (loan)	8	(3)

International career^{‡}
2025–	Venezuela	4	(0)
- * Club domestic league appearances and goals as of 10 November 2026 ‡ National team caps and goals as of 6 October 2026

Jovanny David Bolívar Alvarado (born 16 December 2001) is a Venezuelan professional footballer who plays as a forward for Super League Greece club Kalamata, on loan from Albacete Balompié, and the Venezuela national team.

== Club career ==
On 9 March 2021, Bolívar joined D.C. United on a one-year loan with an option for a permanent transfer. He was later loaned again to D.C. United's reserve team, Loudoun United. Bolívar scored his first goal for Loudoun on 29 May 2021, securing a 1–0 win over New Mexico United.

On 11 January 2023, Bolívar signed a five-and-a-half-year contract with Spanish Segunda División side Albacete Balompié. On 1 September, he moved to fellow league team SD Huesca on a one-year loan deal.

On 10 July 2025, after another loan at Ukrainian Premier League side FC Kolos Kovalivka, Bolívar returned to South America after joining La Equidad also on loan.

== International career ==
Bolívar was called up to the Venezuela national team for a set of friendlies in October 2025.

== Career statistics ==
=== Club ===
As of 20 September 2026.

Club	Season	League			Cup		Continental		Other		Total	
Club	Season	Division	Apps	Goals	Apps	Goals	Apps	Goals	Apps	Goals	Apps	Goals
Deportivo La Guaira	2019	Venezuelan Primera División	9	0	1	0	1 (Note: Appearances in the Copa Libertadores)	0	—		11	0
Deportivo La Guaira	2020	Venezuelan Primera División	18	4	—		—		—		18	4
Deportivo La Guaira	2021	Venezuelan Primera División	0	0	—		—		—		0	0
Deportivo La Guaira	2022	Venezuelan Primera División	35	18	—		8 (Note: Appearances in the Copa Sudamericana)	0	—		43	18
Deportivo La Guaira	Total		62	22	1	0	9	0	—		72	22
D.C. United (loan)	2021	MLS	0	0	—		—		—		0	0
Loudoun United (loan)	2021	USL Championship	19	6	—		—		—		19	6
Albacete	2022-23	Segunda División	7	1	—		—		1 (Note: Appearances in the Segunda División play-offs)	0	8	1
Albacete	2023-24	Segunda División	1	0	—		—		—		1	0
Albacete	Total		8	1	—		—		1	0	9	1
Huesca (loan)	2023-24	Segunda División	19	3	3	0	—		—		22	3
Kolos Kovalivka (loan)	2024–25	Ukrainian Premier League	20	3	—		—		—		20	3
La Equidad (loan)	2025	Liga DIMAYOR	14	1	—		—		—		14	1
Universidad Central (loan)	2026	Liga FUTVE	8	5	—		—		—		8	5
Kalamata (loan)	2026–27	Super League Greece	4	2	3	2	—		—		7	4
Career total			154	43	7	2	9	0	1	0	171	45

=== International ===
As of match played 6 October 2026

Appearances and goals by national team and year
National team	Year	Apps	Goals
Venezuela	2025	1	0
Venezuela	2026	3	0
Total		4	0
