= 2019 D.C. United season =

D.C. United
2019 season
- General manager: Dave Kasper
- Head coach: Ben Olsen
- Stadium: Audi Field
- MLS: Conference: 5th Overall: 10th
- MLS Cup Playoffs: First round
- U.S. Open Cup: Round of 16
- Top goalscorer: League: Wayne Rooney (11); All: Wayne Rooney (13)
- Highest home attendance: 20,600
- Lowest home attendance: 12,521
- Average home league attendance: 18,244
- Biggest win: 5–0 (March 16 vs. Real Salt Lake)
- Biggest defeat: 0–4 (April 6 vs. LAFC); 1–5 (August 4 vs. Philadelphia)
Home colors	Away colors

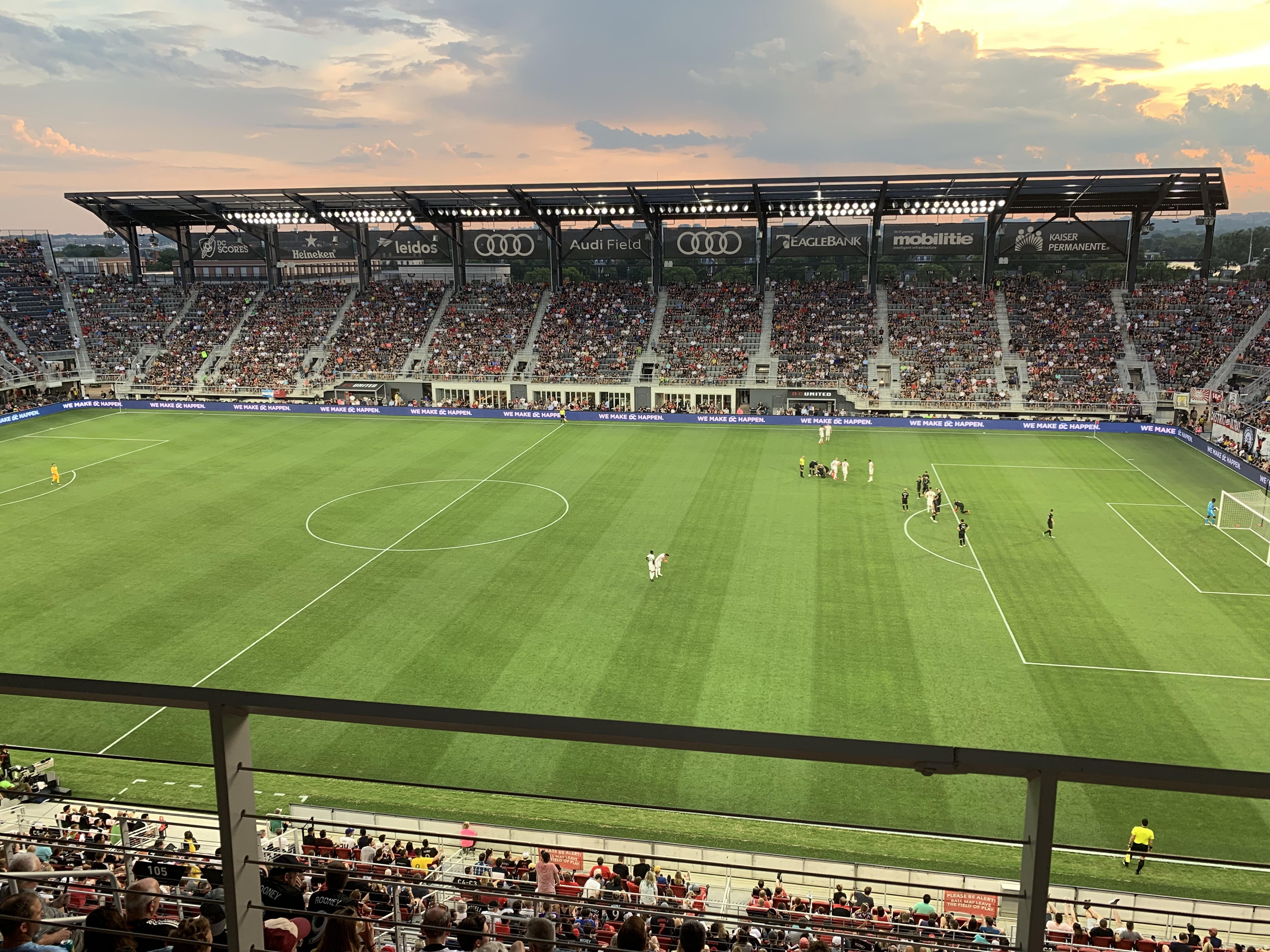
June 29 home match vs. Toronto FC

The 2019 D.C. United season was D.C. United's 24th season of existence, and their 24th in Major League Soccer, the top flight of American soccer. The campaign was the club's first full season playing in Audi Field. Previously, United spent 2018 split between the Maryland SoccerPlex, Navy-Marine Corps Memorial Stadium, and Audi Field.

United finished the season in an upper-mid table position, finishing in 5th place out of 12 in the Eastern Conference, and 10th place out of 24 across the entire league. Outside of MLS, United competed in the 2019 U.S. Open Cup, where they were eliminated in the fifth round, and the 2019 MLS Cup Playoffs, where they were eliminated in the first round.

The 2019 season was also team captain, Wayne Rooney's, final year for United, where he finished the campaign with 11 goals in MLS play and 13 goals across all competitions. As of 2026, this is the most recent season United qualified for the playoffs.

== Review ==
=== Off season ===
The off-season began with D.C. United announcing that they would not pick up options or renew a number of contracts for players on the 2018 roster, including striker Darren Mattocks, one of the team's leading scorers in 2018. Homegrown midfielder Ian Harkes was allowed to seek a spot with a club that would offer more playing time. Defender Taylor Kemp announced his retirement. The team let long-time defender Nick DeLeon go, and he found his way to Toronto FC. Despite interest in returning Yamil Asad, the club was unable to work out an extension of his loan, or a complete transfer. Veteran defender Kofi Opare moved on to a new club, Travis Worra retired, and David Ousted was released to free up cap space and in international roster spot.

In Asad's stead, the team made a loan deal for Lucas Rodriguez, a young attacker from Argentina. Rodriguez was joined by another Argentinean, Leonardo Jara, a right back, who also came on a loan from Boca Juniors. The 2019 MLS SuperDraft brought D.C. United a fullback from Creighton University, Akeem Ward. The team signed two homegrown players, defender Donovan Pines, and midfielder Antonio Bustamante. The club also added veteran depth in goal, with Chris Seitz and Earl Edwards, Jr. As the pre-season neared an end, the team also was able to pick up some depth when Atlanta United F.C. released veteran Chris McCann to free up cap space. The final preseason move brought D.C. a back-up striker, MLS veteran Quincy Amarikwa.

The biggest news of the off-season was a move that did not happen. On the last day of the European transfer window, G.M. Dave Kasper flew to Paris along with Luciano Acosta, to try and complete a transfer to the leading Ligue 1 team, Paris St-Germain F.C. Reportedly the sides were just too far apart on the money involved to consummate the deal. This meant that Acosta entered the season on the final year of his deal with D.C. United.

=== Early season ===
D.C. United began the new season on a cold and rainy night at Audi Field. United opened the season with a 2–0 victory over the defending MLS Cup champions Atlanta United FC. Paul Arriola opened the scoring on the final kick of the half, assisted by Luciano Acosta on a corner kick by Wayne Rooney. In the second half, Lucho Acosta hit a knuckling shot that eluded Atlanta's goalkeeper, Brad Guzan. The team next traveled to New York City to play on NYCFC's famously small pitch.

If it looked as if the team hadn't quite found its stride offensively in the first two matches, any concerns evaporated when the team returned to Audi Field. The visitors were Real Salt Lake and former D.C. United goalkeeper, Nick Rimando, making a farewell tour in his final M.L.S. season. United were merciless in a 5–0 thrashing of the visitors. Captain Wayne Rooney tallied his first-ever MLS hat-trick, putting United out in from 3–0. Rooney had a PK, and a chip over the goalie, in the first half with Leonardo Jara getting his first assist. In the second half, Rooney finished off a pretty combination, with Junior Moreno getting the assist. With RSL down to 9 men, United poured it on. A golazo by Lucas Rodriguez on a corner kick served by Rooney was the newcomer's first goal for the club, and Ulises Segura finished off the scoring. United topped the Eastern Conference, with 7 points from 3 games and not a single goal allowed. A bye week the following week was not totally uneventful, as United signed its 3rd Homegrown player of the year, 16-year old forward Griffin Yow.

On the heels of a great performance by Toronto FC in the debut of their new Designated Player Alejandro Pozuelo, D.C. knew they had to get points in a road game in Orlando to maintain their top position in the Eastern Conference. Steven Birnbaum opened the scoring in the 6th minute heading in a Wayne Rooney corner kick. In the 30th minute, Rooney drew a foul in the opposite corner during the 30th minute. Facing a very sharp angle, Rooney nonetheless was able to bend the ball into the far corner to give the visitors a two-goal lead. D.C. would need that cushion to withstand a furious Orlando rally. Substitute Chris Mueller delivered a cross to the head of Dom Dwyer and Hamid was helpless to keep Dwyer's header out of the goal. It was the first goal D.C. had allowed in the 2019 season, coming 2/3 of the way through the 4th match. Mueller continued to shred the D.C. defense and nearly tied the match in the dying minutes when his header went off the post. The win left D.C. ahead of Columbus in the table, on goals, but with a game in hand on the Crew. However, Toronto trailed by only one point, with a game in hand themselves on D.C. Unfortunately, starting left back Joseph Mora suffered a first-half injury in a collision. Mora would undergo surgery later for a broken jaw, a loss which highlighted the team's lack of depth, including at the fullback position.

A sellout crowd turned out n a Saturday afternoon match at Audi Field, expecting a thrilling, competitive match from the teams topping the Eastern and Western Conference tables, but LAFC quickly ran D.C. off the pitch. Despite Hamid saving an early penalty shot, the visitors took advantage of sloppy midfield play by D.C. to turn turnovers into 3 first-half goals. In the second half, things went from bad to worse as Rooney was red-carded for a rash challenge after turning the ball over. L.A. finished with the man advantage and a 4–0 victory on the strength of a hat-trick by Diego Rossi. It was a difficult start to a busy, taxing 3 games in 8 days stretch and losing Rooney to the red card promised to add additional stresses in the team's next match 3 days later, against Montreal Impact. United began the match against Montreal without More (injury) and Rooney (red card suspension), and finished the game in worse shape thanks to injuries suffered by the two fullbacks who had started the match, Chris McCann and Leonardo Jara. Without Mora, United seemed unable to attack down either wing, and without Rooney, every effort to try to pierce the center of the Montreal defense ended in futility. United was unable to put a single shot on goal, but still managed a scoreless draw thanks to more sterling goaltending by Hamid.

D.C. fielded a new formation and three young Homegrown players making their first starts of the season for a road match in the altitude of Colorado Rapids home field. Things got off to a rough start as the Rapids' Benny Feilhaber was left unmarked on a corner kick and beat Hamid to put the home team in the lead. D.C. finally broke through with Acosta scoring on a blast from about 12 yards, assisted by a slight header touch-on by Donovan Pines getting his first minutes in an MLS match. That goal ended a 245-minute goal-scoring drought for D.C.U., and opened the floodgates. Three minutes later, Lucas Rodriguez set-up Chris Durkin for a blast across goalie Tim Howard and inside the far post. It was Durkin's first MLS goal, coming in his first start of the year. Five minutes later, "Titi" Rodriguez did the business all by himself, picking up a loose ball, charging through the Rapids' defense and then touching it past Howard to put the visitors up 3–1 before halftime. Colorado pulled one back in the 66th minute, as Feilhaber found the head of a poorly marked Kei Kamara. Frantically defending the last half-hour, United fended off a furious assault, requiring a headed stop on the line by Birnbaum. Despite recent struggles, the three points for the win moved D.C. United back to the top of the Eastern Conference table, though high-scoring Toronto F.C. was only 4 points back with 2 games in hand.

An interesting phenomenon began to take shape, as United continued to struggle at home while getting results on the road. United never really threatened the NYCFC goal in a 2–0 home loss, but got the three points with their first win in over a decade in Columbus, a 1–0 victory, secured by a first-half free kick goal by Rooney. Thanks to inconsistent result by other Eastern Conference teams, D.C. remained atop the conference table, as they headed on the road, for the first-ever match in newly opened Allianz Field against Minnesota United FC. Early on, it appeared the run of good road play would continue. D.C. dominated the early play and appeared to take the lead on want would have been Donovan Pines' first MLS goal, heading in a Rooney service. However, video review resulted in the goal being disallowed, controversially, for a possible interference by Brillant. The home team turned the pitch their way in the second half, and Hamid was finally beaten in the 82nd minute when a cross into the box was directed past him. The goal secured Minnesota's historic first win in their new stadium and it continued to expose D.C.'s offensive shortcomings. Over a stretch of 6 games in 21 days, D.C. was shut out in 4 of the last 6 games, and in one of the two others, they got one goal on a Rooney free kick. During those 6 games, their only goals in the run of play were 3 goals in an 8-minute stretch in Colorado.

As injuries continued to pile up for defenders, D.C. worked out a complicated exchange with F.C. Dallas to bring in fullback Marquinhos Pedroso, but Jara returned from a groin injury in time to start at home against Columbus Crew. The run of bad fortune seemed to be continuing when Acosta ran into the referee, and the resulting turnover sent the Crew on a fast break and an early goal. However, the goal was eventually wiped out after a check of the Video Assistant Replay (VAR). Shortly after the game resumed, D.C, won a free kick, which produced their own goal as Acosta pounced on a loose ball in the box to give D.C. its first goal and lead in 3 games. A check of VAR confirmed the goal. Then, in the last minute of first half stoppage time, another check of VAR led to a handball call and a penalty kick for D.C. Rooney scored the PK to put D.C. up 2–0. In the 61st minute, Jara took the ball away from an opponent at midfield and sped toward the goal. He attempted a back heel to Arriola and, though Jara didn't make good contact, Arriola was able to beat the defense to the ball and shot to the far corner of the goal to put the home side up 3–0, with no need to resort to the video replay. In the 76th minute, the Crew spoiled the shutout for DC, or really, Hamid spoiled it for himself. A corner kick was curling in just under the crossbar, but Hamid had the attempt well covered. Nonetheless, he let the ball slip between his hands and into the goal. United held on for a 3–1 win that might have been a too flattering scoreline, but still a welcome result for a team that had been shutout in the two preceding games. With a third of the season behind them, the team was tied with the Philadelphia Union for 1st place in the conference table, with Toronto F.C. 4 points behind but holding 3 games in hand.

=== Midseason ===
D.C. United went into the middle third of the season, still struggling with an ever-growing list of injured. Rookie Donovan Pines had been ruled out for a month due to a knee ligament injury suffered in the win over Columbus. Recent signing Marquinhos Pedroso was forced into the starting lineup at left back, as D.C. kicked off a stretch of 3 games in 7 days, beginning with a Sunday evening match against Sporting KC at Audi Field. The visitors were struggling through even more injuries than D.C., bringing only 13 field players, but fought D.C. to a standstill until Arriola broke through with a curler for the game's only goal in the 79th minute. The victory meant D.C. kept pace with the Philadelphia Union as the teams remained tied for first place in the Eastern Conference.

Following the win over Sporting KC, United travelled for two road games to close the tough 3 games in seven days stretch, and the lineup was out under further pressure when Junior Moreno left to be with his Venezuelan family after the sudden passing of his father. Coach Olsen put together a midweek lineup that was a throwback to the good/bad old days of Bennyball, trying to rest as much of his best XI as possible. Akeem Ward made his first MLS appearance, starting at left back, while Jalen Robinson started on the other side. Durkin made a rare start before heading to join the United States Under-20 World Cup team, and Zoltan Stieber and Quincy Amarikwa led the attack, such as it was. Toronto F.C. allowed a couple of chances early on, but then launched an almost ceaseless assault on the D.C. goal. Hamid turned away 12 shots, and but only 2 of the 35 shots Toronto produced really threatened the goal. Hamid and Brillant together denied their former teammate Nick DeLeon and Jordan Hamilton put the rebound onto the crossbar. In the end, D.C. had to be quite pleased with a point in a scoreless draw.

Playing on short rest, with a very short roster, and on the road at Houston, D.C. United probably shouldn't have expected a result, but hopes rose when the second half began with a quick goal by Rooney to put the visitors in the lead. After the game passed the hour mark, the match went sour for D.C., surrendering two goals in two minutes. To make matters worse, Arriola took a straight red card in the 85th minute, and faced a two-game ban. The following week D.C. hoped to get back on the winning track with a road game against a New England Revolution side which was between managers, with Bruce Arena preparing to take over. First, a midweek exhibition against Spanish side Real Betis provided playing time for younger players. Despite losing the exhibition, fans celebrated homegrown Griffin Yow's first goal for the senior side. On the weekend, United and the Revolution played an uneventful first half. The Revolution went down a man in the second half when goalie Matt Turner took a straight red for a reckless challenge against Rooney. However, United failed to take advantage, and 5 minutes later it was the Revolution that struck, with Juan Agudelo putting the short-handed home team in the lead. United's sputtering offense wasn't helped by the man advantage, but a VAR decision to award D.C. a penalty kick in stoppage time, enabled the team to salvage a point on Rooney's ensuing PK goal. D.C. continued to lead Philadelphia in the table, but the Union had a game-in-hand, trailing by just one point, with a suddenly charging New York Red Bulls just off the pace.

Returning home for two games and missing a suspended Arriola, United made a couple of changes to the lineup, with Segura in Arriola's slot, and Chris Odoi-Atsem making his first start in a personal comeback from lymphoma. After Segura missed an early chance, the Chicago Fire responded with a free-kick goal by long-time D.C. nemesis C.J. Sapong on a terrific service from Nicolás Gaitán. The Fire went up 2–0 when a long-range shot was deflected by Moreno, leaving Hamid unable to stop it. Despite being badly outplayed, United seemed to have stunned the Fire with two quick goals before half-time. The first was a goal by a charging Segura set-up by Rooney. The second effort, coming in stoppage-time came when Acosta sent Rodriguez in on goal. Rodriguez' shot was stopped, but the ball seemed to pop back up to Rodriguez as he passed the goalie, and Rodriguez finished the play. However, the goal was disallowed for a handball after VAR review. Strong goalkeeping by Hamid kept DC in the game, and a long ball by Jara found Segura, who finished for his second goal of the game. United seemed to have completed the comeback when Acosta put the team in the lead, heading a Jara cross. However, the Fire salvaged a draw in stoppage time, when Bastian Schweinsteiger played the ball into the box with an overhead bicycle kick that found the head of Francisco Calvo, who deflected it past the onrushing Hamid. A draw was probably a fair result, but the referees' organization, PRO, later advised that VAR should have overruled the goal call for offside. The dropped points definitely deflated the emotions of the crowd and team after the impressive comeback seemed to have secured a win for the home team.

In the final match before a two-week break for the 2019 CONCACAF Gold Cup, D.C. were bossed around the pitch for much of the first half. An early injury to Canouse forced a formation switch which the visiting San Jose Earthquakes kept exploiting until M.L.S. all-time leading scorer Chris Wondolowski headed a ball off the post to take a 1–0 lead. United were outshot 17–3 in the half, but really turned the match around in the second half, before finally evening the score when Acosta finished the rebound off a shot by Jara. A second consecutive home draw significantly impacted United's standing as they trailed 3 other Eastern Conference teams, at least in points per game.

During the Gold Cup break, D.C. United opened its 2019 U.S. Open Cup campaign, playing its first-ever Open Cup match in Audi Field, against a familiar Cup foe, Philadelphia Union. Despite no upcoming MLS match, D.C. had to field a very makeshift lineup. Joseph Mora made his return from a broken jaw injury, but Jara was forced to play in defensive midfield for the first time, because the top 3 at the position were all unavailable, either for international duty, injury or card suspension. He was joined in the midfield by Antonio Bustamante, a homegrown signing getting his first action for D.C. United in a competitive match. The teams were scoreless through 90 minutes and the first overtime period. However, as rain had begun to pour down over the field, the visiting Union side broke through with what seemed a sure game-winner in the 113th minute. However, substitute Chris McCann drew United back even with a header off of a Rooney corner kick in the 118th minute, and Lucho Acosta drew a penalty in the box in the final minute. Rooney finished the penalty kick to win the match and send D.C. through to the next round, where they would host NYCFC.

In their Round of 16 match in the 2019 U.S. Open Cup, D.C. missed a great chance when Rooney's shot hit the post in the first minute. The visitors dominated the next half-hour, but against the run of play, United struck when a long ball from Segura found Rooney, who took it off his chest and beat NYCFC's goalie to give D.C. a lead in the 32nd minute. The lead vanished six minutes later when the central defense lost track of the visitor's striker, Alexandru Mitriță, who collected a pass over the defense and beat United keeper, Chris Seitz to draw even. Two and half minutes later, Rodriguez was knocked over and dispossessed. With no foul called, the visitors went quickly on the attack and struck to take a lead they never gave back. D.C. went out of the Open Cup with a 2–1 home loss.

After the short break for international play, MLS play resumed, with D.C. United having two home games in 4 nights. Due to ongoing tournaments, D.C. was still without two starting midfielders, Arriola and Moreno. In a midweek match versus Orlando City SC, D.C. didn't create a lot of chances, but gained 3 points with a 1–0 win, secured when Wayne Rooney caught Orlando goalkeeper Brian Rowe far off his line, and chipped for a goal from beyond the midfield stripe. An apparent second-half goal by Segura was ruled offside by VAR, but D.C. was able to keep yet another clean sheet. The win proved somewhat costly, as Mora's return to MLS play from his broken jaw was cut short because he suffered an ankle sprain likely to keep him out for weeks. Mora's absence created additional issues for Head Coach Ben Olsen, who didn't have a lot of great options at fullback and midfield. He chose to give Zoltan Stieber a start on the wing, despite speculation that he would soon be sold on in the summer window. McCann got the start at left back. Those moves proved fateful in the 19th minute, when Toronto FC midfielder Richie Laryea was able to get around Stieber along the end line and past McCann to set-up Nick DeLeon for an easy tap=in to give the visitors an early lead. It was an emphatic moment for DeLeon in his return to Audi Field, suiting up against his former D.C. United side for the first time. That goal nearly lasted to the final whistle, but VAR found a foul when Frédéric Brillant was tackled inside the box in the 90th minute. Rooney coolly scored the penalty kick to give United a 1–1 draw, and second place in the Eastern Conference table, one point off of Philadelphia Union's pace.

The poor run of form continued in a July Fourth match on the road against FC Dallas. The home team opened the scoring in the 6th minute, and made it 2–0 in the 65th minute. That ended the scoring, but things went from bad to worse for D.C. United when Acosta picked up a red card as he clumsily attempted to step over a fallen opponent. Acosta had only come on as a sub in the 58th minute, and his absence in a home match the following weekend was going to make it hard for the team to find chances even on the home pitch. The schedule didn't do D.C. any favor, as former head coach Bruce Arena returned to D.C. unbeaten in 7 games since taking over the helm of New England Revolution. Playing a new formation in Acosta's absence, United was out of sorts defensively and fell behind 2–0, before Jara restored some order, finishing on a cross from Arriola just before halftime. It was Jara's first goal for the club. In the second half, United began to figure things out, and Rodriguez drew a foul that left the Revolution playing a man down for the remainder. D.C. gained a point with an 86th-minute equalizer, as Quincy Amarikwa also got his first goal for D.C., with an acrobatic volley to score on a Wayne Rooney free kick service.

A compressed two-game road trip began against cellar-dwelling expansion side FC Cincinnati, and it proved to be a coming out party for Titi Rodriguez, who scored the team's first two goals and assisted Arriola on the fourth in a 4–1 drubbing of the home side, whose only goal came on penalty kick for a highly dubious handball call on the preceding free kick. The third goal was a masterwork engineered by Jara, who intercepted a pass, sidestepped a defender, and sent a long ball to Rooney that split the defense, and set up Rooney for an elegant finish that gave the team a two-goal lead, only 10 minutes after the team had lost their early lead. It was a convincing win, coming without Acosta who was still on suspension and without Hamid, who sat after violating a team rule. It was only the team's second win in a ten-game stretch, but a much-needed confidence boost going into a match in Atlanta, against a red hot Atlanta United F.C.

D.C. went to Atlanta as big underdogs, and the task didn't get any easier as Rooney was left out of the lineup. Still, for nearly 90 minutes, it seemed United's bunkering strategy might earn a point. Atlanta had better than 70 percent of the possession, but United arguably had the better arguments for goals, failing to convert on several counter-attacking runs. Atlanta's best chance had come when Josef Martinez drew penalty call in the second half, but Martinez missed the penalty kick. Atlanta finally broke through in the 89th minute, with a tap-in header by Pity Martinez. Josef Martinez added a second goal on a breakaway in stoppage time. The loss meant D.C. slipped to 3rd place in the standings, behind Atlanta, but D.C also had fewer points per game than the two New York area teams, both of which had games in hand. New England and Toronto were rising quickly, and Montreal received good news as Ignacio Piatti played for the first time in 2 months. As D.C. United headed into the final third of its schedule, even a place in the top 7 and a playoff position hardly seemed a sure thing.

=== Late season ===
United made a couple of personnel moves, signing former University of Maryland star Gordon Wild, and releasing their own top pick, Akeem Ward to make room. In addition, D.C. and Zoltan Stieber agreed on terms for a mutual release of his contract. With only 11 games left in the season, United didn't look like favorites to win many of the remaining games. A visit to the lowly Chicago Fire might have been the best chance to win on the road, and Olsen finally had his best XI available. Still, he chose to continue to use the 3 centerback set he had been employing before out of need. Surprisingly, he left Mora on the bench, to start Rodriguez and Jara as wingbacks. The set-up never really threatened the Chicago goal. D.C. was only able to secure a road draw thanks to Hamid's usual strong goalkeeping and some surprising defensive brilliance from Brillant, whose interventions denied three certain goal-scoring opportunities. Meanwhile, Montreal, led by a healthy Piatti, posted a convincing 4–0 over Philadelphia, 4–1 win by New England, and some brilliance by a healthy Jozy Altidore led Toronto to a victory.

Although D.C. United still sat in third place, the week's results left the fan base wondering if the team would be able to qualify for the playoffs. The release of Steiber opened up an international player slot and perhaps some cap space to go abroad to find someone to boost the attack. The team was also giving a trial to former U.S.A. international, Jose Francisco Torres. Still, the team pondered its options, making no moves other than releasing McCann. With Canouse injured, the team was now down to central midfielders, neither of whom would finish the next match, at home against Philadelphia. United fell behind early thanks to Pines turnover that led to a Union goal by Alejandro Bedoya. Then Durkin went down with an injury. In the 40th minute, Moreno was issued a red card for a last man foul in the box. Though the Union failed to convert the spot kick, they did dd a goal just before halftime. The lead grew to 3–0 in the second half, before Brillant knocked in a loose ball to get United's only goal in a match that would end up a 5–1 drubbing by the conference-leading Philadelphia Union.

With Durkin joining Canouse among the ranks of the injured, D.C. urgently needed mores midfield strength, along with a striker up top. In the end, D.C. made a flurry of moves at the transfer deadline, adding former Crew and Galaxy striker Ola Kamara and trading for long-time nemesis midfielder Felipe Martins and L.A. Galaxy winger Emmanuel Boateng. This all came on the heels of an announcement that Wayne Rooney would return to English football at the end of the MLS season.

Due to an illness, Rooney wasn't fit to make the pitch for the Sunday night home match against Zlatan Ibrahimovic and L.A. Galaxy. Olsen also kept Lucho Acosta out of the starting lineup, which left a sell-out crowd expecting another thrashing by a more potent visiting club. Ibrahimovic would set a league record for most shots by a player in one game, but he was unable to convert any of the shots into goals. D.C. surprised everyone, thanks to the usual great goaltending by Hamid, a goal line clearance by Rodriguez, good central midfield play by Martins and Jara filling in for the team's usual starters, and goals by Arriola and Rodriguez, sandwiching the lone Galaxy score. The surprising win left United clinging to 3rd place in the standings.

United needed an injection of coincidence, which seemed to come with Rooney's return to the lineup. On a trip to Vancouver, United enjoyed the better of possession and the number of chances, but the team failed to convert, whereas Vancouver Whitecaps FC did finish a chance in the 18th minute and held on for a 1–0 win. A midweek rivalry match at home against New York Red Bulls didn't go much better. The visitors took the lead in the 6th minute after a defensive miscue. Then, Rooney was shown a red card for an off-the-ball incident as players jockeyed for position as D.C. defended a corner kick. United caught a break when a NYRB was shown a second yellow for a foul just before halftime. Ola Kamara notched his first goal in a D.C. United uniform with a stunning curler in the 55th minute and momentum seemed to be heading in the home side's direction. However, a very dubious penalty was called against D.C. just 3 minutes later (and no video review was ordered). The resulting successful spot kick was the difference in a crucial home loss against a team battling with D.C. for playoff position. Without Rooney in the lineup, D.C. lost its third straight match in a road match against Philadelphia Union. Once again, the Union simply ran D.C off the pitch, on the strength of 3 first-half goals. Acosta pulled one back in the second half, but the 3–1 loss left D.C. on the precipice of falling out of playoff position.

With Rooney again out of the lineup, United didn't figure to feature much offense in a trip to Montreal, but the team showed unusual clinical finishing in a 3–0 road win. Kamara scored first as free kick deflected through the defensive wall and provided the new D.C. striker with a straightforward chance, with only a helpless goalie to beat. Arriola scored a few minutes later on a breakaway, when a Hamid kick deflected into his path. Finally, Kamara finished off a well-worked corner kick with a header, assisted by Brillant and Martins. The win left the team with a decent chance of securing a home playoff match over their final four matches.

A week later, D.C. notched a second consecutive road win, with one of the more unlikely results of the season, a 1–0 win in Portland, over Portland Timbers. D.C. took the lead on an own goal coming on what seemed an otherwise harmless cross by Segura into the box, with no D.C. player in position to finish. D.C. probably deserved a second goal in the 38th minute, as a Rooney corner kick ricocheted off a pair of Timbers players including the goalie, and appeared to have crossed the line, before being cleared by former D.C. United academy player Eryk Williamson. A television replay appeared to show a goal, but VAR did not have that angle, and upheld the on-field no goal decision, relying on a different angle which was at best unclear if the entire ball had cleared the line. Portland controlled 2/3 of the possession, with most of the second half being played in D.C.'s defensive third, but were unable to find the tying goal, having struck the frame of the goal on several shots. With only 3 games left in their schedule, the result appeared to solidify D.C.'s playoff prospects. The team remained even with Toronto in a race for 4th place and the final home-field advantage spot in the opening round, but Toronto held a tie-breaking edge with a better goal differential.

Thanks to results for other teams on Saturday, United came into a Sunday night home match against Seattle Sounders FC knowing they had already qualified for the playoffs, but in a three-way struggle to gain home field in the opening round. Toronto had squandered a rare chance to gain a road win against the league-leading LAFC, surrendering a penalty kick in stoppage time. D.C. capitalize on the opportunity, playing perhaps their most complete match since their 5–0 rout of Real Salt Lake in the third match of the season, over six months earlier. Titi Rodriguez gave D.C. an early lead when he collected a deflection in the 18-yard box and drilled a shot into the corner of the goal. In the second half, a Rooney free kick found Brillant, who tapped in for the clinching goal. The win left United in 4th place, just one point on top of New York Red Bulls, ahead of a crucial match in Red Bull Arena. Unsurprisingly, D.C. United was satisfied with a bunkering strategy against the Red Bulls. Thanks to a goal-line clearance by Brillant and a spectacular save by Hamid, the team secured a scoreless draw and held on to the 4th spot in the Eastern Conference, heading into the final weekend. Unfortunately, Rooney would once again be sidelined in the final match, thanks to a suspension for yellow-card accumulation.

On the final day of the regular season, United's position was boosted by Montreal Impact taking an early 2–0 lead over the Red Bulls, but when Toronto F.C. went ahead of Columbus Crew, D.C. still needed a win against the league's worst team FC Cincinnati to gain the home-field advantage in the opening playoff match. That result seemed all but inevitable when two Cincinnati players were ejected late in the first half. D.C. United apparently scored on the restart, but the goal was overturned by video review. Over the final 55 minutes of play, despite the two-man advantage, D.C. was unable to score. As a result, D.C. ended the season tied with Toronto in the table but moved into 5th place because Toronto had a +5 goal differential, one goal better than D.C's +4 goal differential, which served to highlight the significance of several officiating errors that had deprived D.C. of deserved goals.

=== MLS Cup Playoffs ===
DC United traveled to Toronto for their opening round match in the 2019 MLS Cup Playoffs, where they seemed to destined to end their season and end the Wayne Rooney and Luciano Acosta era. D.C. did trail for an hour after surrendering a goal on the 35th minute, but a stoppage time goal by Titi Rodriguez in the second half stunned the home side, giving the visitors new life. The Extra Time period showed just how cruel the game can be though. D.C. United's defense suffered an epic collapse, surrendering 4 goals in the overtime period, ending the season with a 5–1 loss.

== Non-competitive ==
=== Preseason exhibitions ===
February 2, 2019	D.C. United	1–0	Bethlehem Steel FC	Clearwater, FL
16:00 EST	Kadono 57'	Report		Stadium: Joe DiMaggio Sports Complex

February 7, 2019	D.C. United	1–1	FC Cincinnati	Bradenton, FL
19:00 EST	Acosta 21'	Report	Albadawi 81'	Stadium: IMG Academy

February 16, 2019	Tampa Bay Rowdies	0–1	D.C. United	St. Petersburg, FL
19:30 EST	Diakité (yellow card) 47'	Report	Acosta (yellow card) 3'; Arriola 33'	Stadium: Al Lang Stadium

February 20, 2019	D.C. United	1–2	Philadelphia Union	Clearwater, FL
16:00 EST	Rooney 23'	Report	Burke (yellow card) 31', (goal) 74'; Fabián 60'	Stadium: Joe DiMaggio Sports Complex

February 23, 2019	D.C. United	0–3	Montreal Impact	St. Petersburg, FL
19:00 EST		Report	Piatti 8'; Urruti 78'; Choinière (yellow card) 88', (goal) 90+1'	Stadium: Al Lang Stadium

=== Midseason exhibitions ===
May 22, 2019	D.C. United	2–5	Real Betis	Washington D.C.
20:00 EST	Yow 47'; Amarikwa 69'	Report	Loren 16'; León 37'; Robles (yellow card) 52'; Joaquín 64'; Bartra 72' (pen.); Rober 76'	Stadium: Audi Field

July 24, 2019	D.C. United	1–8	Marseille	Washington D.C.
20:00 EST	Amarikwa 44'	Report	Strootman 28'; Radonjić 48'; Lopez 52', 57'; Sarr 55', 85'; Chabrolle 83'; Khaoui 89'	Stadium: Audi Field

September 4, 2019	D.C. United	1–1	Puebla	Washington D.C.
	Amarikwa 4'	Report	Callega 75'	Stadium: Audi Field

=== Postseason exhibitions ===
November 15, 2019	D.C. United	4–2	Bermuda	Saint Croix, U.S. Virgin Islands
18:00 EDT	Kamara 7'; Wild 28'; Yow 49', 65'	Report	Lewis 36'; Bascome 45+1'	Stadium: Bethlehem Soccer Stadium

== Competitive ==
=== MLS ===
March 3, 2019 1	D.C. United	2–0	Atlanta United FC	Washington, D.C.
18:30 EST	Arriola 45+2'; Acosta 58'	Report	Ambrose (yellow card) 53'; Larentowicz (yellow card) 83'	Stadium: Audi Field; Attendance: 16,942; Referee: Jair Marrufo

March 10, 2019 2	New York City FC	0–0	D.C. United	New York, New York
15:00 EDT	Chanot (yellow card) 27'	Report	Jara (yellow card) 57'; Mora (yellow card) 73'	Stadium: Yankee Stadium; Attendance: 24,361; Referee: Nima Saghafi

March 16, 2019 3	D.C. United	5–0	Real Salt Lake	Washington, D.C.
20:00 EDT	Rooney 34' (pen.), 41', 65'; Canouse (yellow card) 37'; Moreno (yellow card) 57'; Rodríguez (yellow card) 71' (goal) 76'; Segura 80'	Report	Silva (yellow card) 32' (yellow-red card) 67'; Savarino (red card) 45+3'; Saucedo (yellow card) 70'; Baird (yellow card) 78'	Stadium: Audi Field; Attendance: 17,190; Referee: David Gantar

March 31, 2019 4	Orlando City SC	1–2	D.C. United	Orlando, Florida
18:30 EDT	Sané (yellow card) 29'; Dwyer 63'	Report	Birnbaum 6'; Rooney 30'; Brillant (yellow card) 67'	Stadium: Orlando City Stadium; Attendance: 22,481; Referee: Armando Villarreal

April 6, 2019 5	D.C. United	0–4	Los Angeles FC	Washington, D.C.
14:30 EST	Rooney (red card) 52'; Moreno (yellow card) 54'; Brillant (yellow card) 64'; Rodriguez (yellow card) 89'	Report	Vela 16'; Rossi 27', 32', 76'	Stadium: Audi Field; Attendance: 20,600; Referee: Robert Sibiga

April 9, 2019 6	D.C. United	0–0	Montreal Impact	Washington, D.C.
20:00 EST	Arriola (yellow card) 27'; Jara (yellow card) 40'	Report	Shome (yellow card) 49'; Taïder (yellow card) 62'	Stadium: Audi Field; Attendance: 18,116; Referee: Chris Penso

April 13, 2019 7	Colorado Rapids	2–3	D.C. United	Commerce City, Colorado
21:00 EST	Feilhaber 11'; Price (yellow card) 36'; Kamara (yellow card) 49', (goal) 66'; Acosta (yellow card) 82'	Report	Acosta 35'; Durkin 38'; Rodríguez 43'; Birnbaum (yellow card) 76'	Stadium: Dick's Sporting Goods Park; Attendance: 15,094; Referee: Ted Unkel

April 21, 2019 8	D.C. United	0–2	New York City FC	Washington, D.C.
16:00 EST	Durkin (yellow card) 44'; Jara (yellow card) 45+3'; Arriola (yellow card) 90+1'	Report	Mitriță 35'; Lewis (yellow card) 48'; Ofori (yellow card) 52'; Héber 56'; Moralez (yellow card) 77'; Medina (yellow card) 90'; Johnson (yellow card) 90+4'	Stadium: Audi Field; Attendance: 18,004; Referee: Allen Chapman

April 24, 2019 9	Columbus Crew	0–1	D.C. United	Columbus, Ohio
19:30 EST	Jo. Williams (yellow card) 25'; Jiménez (yellow card) 69'	Report	Birnbaum (yellow card) 4'; Rooney 27'; Rodríguez (yellow card) 80'	Stadium: Mapfre Stadium; Attendance: 10,169; Referee: Ismail Elfath

April 28, 2019 10	Minnesota United FC	1–0	D.C. United	Saint Paul, Minnesota
13:30 EST	Métanire (yellow card) 19'; Rodríguez 82'	Report	Birnbaum (yellow card) 45'	Stadium: Allianz Field; Attendance: 19,620; Referee: Nima Saghafi

May 4, 2019 11	D.C. United	3–1	Columbus Crew	Washington, D.C.
20:00 EST	Acosta 27'; Rooney 45+4' (pen.); Moreno (yellow card) 53'; Arriola 61'	Report	Trapp (yellow card) 26'; Higuaín (yellow card) 45+4'; Hamid 75' (o.g.)	Stadium: Audi Field; Attendance: 16,687; Referee: Ted Unkel

May 12, 2019 12	D.C. United	1–0	Sporting Kansas City	Washington, D.C.
19:00 EST	Brillant (yellow card) 45'; Arriola 78'	Report	Sallói (yellow card) 11'	Stadium: Audi Field; Attendance: 12,521; Referee: Alan Kelly

May 15, 2019 13	Toronto FC	0–0	D.C. United	Toronto, Ontario
20:00 EST	Morrow (yellow card) 82'	Report	Segura (yellow card) 61'	Stadium: BMO Field; Attendance: 26,116; Referee: Drew Fischer

May 18, 2019 14	Houston Dynamo	2–1	D.C. United	Houston, Texas
20:30 EST	Martínez (yellow card) 38'; Rodríguez 67'; McNamara 68'; Struna (yellow card) 90+5'	Report	Rooney 46'; Canouse (yellow card) 76'; Arriola (red card) 85'	Stadium: BBVA Compass Stadium; Attendance: 15,811; Referee: Rubiel Vazquez

May 25, 2019 15	New England Revolution	1–1	D.C. United	Foxborough, Massachusetts
19:30 EST	Penilla (yellow card) 45' Farrell (yellow card) 53'; Turner (red card) 56'; Agudelo 61' Bunbury (yellow card) 65'	Report	Rooney 90' (pen.)	Stadium: Gillette Stadium; Attendance: 20,131; Referee: David Gantar

May 29, 2019 16	D.C. United	3–3	Chicago Fire	Washington, D.C.
20:00 EST	Segura 43', 61'; Canouse (yellow card) 49'; Acosta 81'	Report	Sapong 12'; Mihailovic 14'; Frankowski (yellow card) 62'; Calvo 90+2'	Stadium: Audi Field; Attendance: 14,201; Referee: Armando Villarreal

June 1, 2019 17	D.C. United	1–1	San Jose Earthquakes	Washington, D.C.
20:00 EST	Acosta 67'; Brillant (yellow card) 90+3'; Rooney (yellow card) 90+8'; Arriola (yellow card) 90+9'	Report	Chris Wondolowski 37'; Valeri Qazaishvili (yellow card) 66'; Harold Cummings (yellow card) 85'; Nick Lima (yellow card) 90+2'	Stadium: Audi Field; Attendance: 18,002; Referee: Ramy Touchan

June 26, 2019 18	D.C. United	1–0	Orlando City SC	Washington, D.C.
20:00 EST	Rooney 10'; Rodríguez (yellow card) 90'	Report	Ruan (yellow card) 27'; Kljestan (yellow card) 89'	Stadium: Audi Field; Referee: Alex Chilowicz

June 29, 2019 19	D.C. United	1–1	Toronto FC	Washington, D.C.
20:00 EST	Brilliant (yellow card) 53'; Rooney 90+2' (pen.)	Report	DeLeon 18' (yellow card) 87'; Laryea (yellow card) 42'; Chapman (yellow card) 65'	Stadium: Audi Field; Attendance: 18,854; Referee: Robert Sibiga

July 4, 2019 20	FC Dallas	2–0	D.C. United	Frisco, Texas
21:00 EST	Mosquera 6'; Hedges (yellow card) 22'; Hollingshead (yellow card) 35'; Badji 65'	Report	Rooney (yellow card) 33'; Canouse (yellow card) 46'; Acosta (red card) 73'; Amarikwa (yellow card) 90+7'	Stadium: Toyota Stadium; Attendance: 19,096; Referee: Nima Saghafi

July 12, 2019 21	D.C. United	2–2	New England Revolution	Washington, D.C.
19:00 EST	Jara (yellow card) 37', (goal) 43'; Arriola (yellow card) 40'; Birnbaum (yellow card) 67'; Amarikwa 86'	Report	Bunbury 4'; J. Caicedo (yellow card) 23'; Gil 32'; Zahibo (yellow card) 49' (yellow-red card) 63'; L. Caicedo (yellow card) 81'; Turner (yellow card) 83'	Stadium: Audi Field; Attendance: 18,903; Referee: Ted Unkel

July 18, 2019 22	FC Cincinnati	1–4	D.C. United	Cincinnati, Ohio
20:00 EST	Waston (yellow card) 15'; Ledesma 54' (pen.); Bertone (yellow card) 61'	Report	Birnbaum (yellow card) 32'; Rodríguez 42', 59'; Rooney (yellow card) 54', (goal) 64'; Canouse (yellow card) 70'; Arriola (yellow card) 54', (goal) 73'	Stadium: Nippert Stadium; Attendance: 28,774; Referee: Baldomero Toledo

July 21, 2019 23	Atlanta United FC	2–0	D.C. United	Atlanta, Georgia
16:00 EST	González Pirez (yellow card) 81'; P. Martínez 89'; J. Martínez 90+2'	Report		Stadium: Mercedes-Benz Stadium; Attendance: 44,405; Referee: Allen Chapman

July 27, 2019 24	Chicago Fire SC	0–0	D.C. United	Bridgeview, Illinois
20:00 EST	Sapong (yellow card) 54'; Kappelhof (yellow card) 58'	Report	Pines (yellow card) 69'	Stadium: SeatGeek Stadium; Attendance: 18,232; Referee: Kevin Stott

August 4, 2019 25	D.C. United	1–5	Philadelphia Union	Washington, D.C.
19:30 EST	Moreno (red card) 40'; Brillant 54'	Report	Bedoya 3', (yellow card) 31'; Medunjanin (yellow card) 25'; Fabián (yellow card) 42', (goal) 45+2', 70'; Przybylko 52'; Collin (yellow card) 53'; Picault 90'	Stadium: Audi Field; Attendance: 18,697; Referee: Armando Villarreal

August 11, 2019 26	D.C. United	2–1	LA Galaxy	Washington, D.C.
19:30 EST	Arriola 28'; Rodríguez 73'; Amarikwa (yellow card) 75'	Report	F. Álvarez 48'	Stadium: Audi Field; Attendance: 20,006; Referee: Alan Kelly

August 17, 2019 27	Vancouver Whitecaps FC	1–0	D.C. United	Vancouver, British Columbia
22:00 EST	Reyna 18'; Teibert (yellow card) 53'; Rose (yellow card) 69'; Crépeau (yellow card) 90+6'; Hwang (yellow card) 90+7'	Report	Rodríguez (yellow card) 14'	Stadium: BC Place; Attendance: 22,120; Referee: Timothy Ford

August 21, 2019 28	D.C. United	1–2	New York Red Bulls	Washington, D.C.
20:00 EST	Rooney (red card) 24'; Kamara 55'	Report	Kaku 6'; Tarek (red card) 45+3'; Royer 59' (pen.)	Stadium: Audi Field; Attendance: 18,302; Referee: Ismail Elfath

August 24, 2019 29	Philadelphia Union	3–1	D.C. United	Chester, Pennsylvania
19:30 EST	Przybylko 5'; Aaronson 16'; Ilsinho 36'; Bedoya (yellow card) 73'	Report	Arriola (yellow card) 21'; Acosta 56'; Jara (yellow card) 90+3'	Stadium: Talen Energy Stadium; Attendance: 18,781; Referee: Chris Penso

August 31, 2019 30	Montreal Impact	0–3	D.C. United	Montreal, Quebec
19:30 EST	Camacho (yellow card) 18'; Urruti (yellow card) 56'	Report	Kamara 20', 32'; Mora (yellow card) 21'; Arriola 23'	Stadium: Stade Saputo; Attendance: 18,285; Referee: Allen Chapman

September 15, 2019 31	Portland Timbers	0–1	D.C. United	Portland, Oregon
15:30 EST	Williamson (yellow card) 46'	Report	Tuiloma 24' (o.g.); Rooney (yellow card) 64'	Stadium: Providence Park; Attendance: 25,218; Referee: Drew Fischer

September 22, 2019 32	D.C. United	2–0	Seattle Sounders FC	Washington, D.C.
20:00 EST	Rodríguez 14'; Brillant 54'	Report	Leerdam (yellow card) 53'	Stadium: Audi Field; Attendance: 18,489; Referee: Alan Kelly

September 29, 2019 33	New York Red Bulls	0–0	D.C. United	Harrison, New Jersey
17:00 EST				Stadium: Red Bull Arena; Attendance: 20,118

October 6, 2019 34	D.C. United	0–0	FC Cincinnati	Washington, D.C.
16:00 EST				Stadium: Audi Field; Attendance: 18,732

=== MLS Cup ===
October 19, 2019 First round	Toronto FC	5–1 (a.e.t.)	D.C. United	Toronto, Ontario
18:00 EST	Delgado 32', (yellow card) 72'; Osorio (yellow card) 40', (goal) 95', 103'; Laryea 93'; Morrow (yellow card) 102'; DeLeon 105+1'	Report; Boxscore	Rodríguez 90+3'; Jara (yellow card) 109'; Arriola (yellow card) 112' (yellow-red card) 118'	Stadium: BMO Field; Attendance: 25,331; Referee: Allen Chapman

=== U.S. Open Cup ===
June 12, 2019 Fourth round	D.C. United	2–1 (a.e.t.)	Philadelphia Union	Washington D.C.
19:00 EST	Robinson (yellow card) 68'; Rodríguez (yellow card) 83'; McCann 118'; Rooney 120' (pen.)	Report	Bedoya (yellow card) 95'; McKenzie (yellow card) 96'; Fontana 113'; Ilsinho (yellow card) 115'	Stadium: Audi Field; Referee: Marcos de Oliveira

June 19, 2019 Fifth round	D.C. United	1–2	NYCFC	Washington D.C.
19:00 EST	Rooney 32'; Robinson (yellow card) 55'; Acosta (yellow card) 69'; Rodríguez (yellow card) 76'	Report	Mitriță 38'; Tajouri-Shradi 41'	Stadium: Audi Field; Referee: Fotis Bazakos

== Squad information ==
As of September 21, 2019.

No.	Name	Nat	Position	Since	Date of birth (age)	Signed from	Games	Goals
Goalkeepers
1	Chris Seitz	(United States)	GK	2019	March 12, 1987 (aged 31)	(United States) Houston Dynamo	1	0
24	Bill Hamid	(United States)	GK	2018	November 25, 1990 (aged 28)	(Denmark) Midtjylland (loan)	238	0
36	Earl Edwards Jr.	(United States)	GK	2019	January 24, 1992 (aged 27)	(United States) Orlando City	0	0
Defenders
3	Chris Odoi-Atsem	(United States)	RB	2017	May 28, 1995 (aged 23)	(United States) Maryland Terrapins	13	0
6	Marquinhos Pedroso	(Brazil)	LB	2019	October 4, 1993 (aged 25)	(United States) FC Dallas	4	0
13	Frédéric Brillant	(France)	CB	2017	June 26, 1985 (aged 33)	(United States) New York City FC	59	1
15	Steve Birnbaum	(United States)	CB	2014	January 23, 1991 (aged 28)	(United States) California Golden Bears	167	8
20	Jalen Robinson	(United States)	CB	2014	May 8, 1994 (aged 24)	(United States) Wake Forest Demon Deacons	26	0
23	Donovan Pines	(United States)	DF	2019	March 7, 1998 (aged 20)	(United States) Maryland Terrapins	10	0
28	Joseph Mora	(Costa Rica)	LB	2018	January 15, 1993 (aged 26)	(Costa Rica) Saprissa	48	0
29	Leonardo Jara	(Argentina)	RB	2019	May 20, 1991 (aged 27)	(Argentina) Boca Juniors (loan)	28	1
91	Oniel Fisher	(Jamaica)	RB / LB	2018	November 22, 1991 (aged 27)	(United States) Seattle Sounders	25	1
Midfielders
4	Russell Canouse	(United States)	CM	2017	June 11, 1995 (aged 23)	(Germany) TSG 1899 Hoffenheim	54	1
5	Júnior Moreno	(Venezuela)	DM	2018	July 20, 1993 (aged 25)	(Venezuela) Zulia	47	0
7	Paul Arriola	(United States)	RM / RF	2017	February 5, 1995 (aged 24)	(Mexico) Tijuana	66	14
8	Ulises Segura	(Costa Rica)	CM	2017	June 23, 1993 (aged 25)	(Costa Rica) Saprissa	54	5
10	Luciano Acosta	(Argentina)	AM	2016	May 31, 1994 (aged 24)	(Argentina) Boca Juniors	125	24
11	Lucas Rodríguez	(Argentina)	AM	2019	April 27, 1997 (aged 21)	(Argentina) Estudiantes (loan)	30	5
17	Emmanuel Boateng	(Ghana)	LM / SS	2019	January 17, 1994 (aged 25)	(United States) LA Galaxy	2	0
18	Felipe	(Brazil)	CM	2019	September 30, 1990 (aged 28)	(Canada) Vancouver Whitecaps	6	0
19	Gordon Wild	(Germany)	AM / SS	2019	October 16, 1995 (aged 23)	(United States) Atlanta United	0	0
26	Antonio Bustamante	(United States)	MF / FW	2019	June 20, 1997 (aged 21)	(United States) William & Mary Tribe	0	0
Forwards
9	Wayne Rooney (c)	(England)	CF	2018	October 24, 1985 (aged 33)	(England) Everton	47	23
14	Ola Kamara	(Norway)	CF	2019	October 15, 1989 (aged 29)	(China) Shenzhen	4	3
22	Griffin Yow	(United States)	FW	2019	September 25, 2002 (aged 16)	(United States) D.C. United Academy	2	0
25	Quincy Amarikwa	(United States)	CF	2019	October 29, 1987 (aged 31)	(Canada) Montreal Impact	20	1

== Statistics ==
=== Appearances and goals ===
No.	Pos.	Player	MLS			US Open Cup			MLS Cup			Total		
No.	Pos.	Player	Apps	Goals	Asst.	Apps	Goals	Asst.	Apps	Goals	Asst.	Apps	Goals	Asst.
1	GK	Chris Seitz	1	0	0	2	0	0	0	0	0	3	0	0
3	DF	Chris Odoi-Atsem	1+2	0	0	0	0	0	0	0	0	3	0	0
4	MF	Russell Canouse	22+1	0	0	0+1	0	0	0	0	0	24	0	0
5	MF	Júnior Moreno	26	0	3	0	0	0	0	0	0	26	0	3
6	DF	Marquinhos Pedroso	3+1	0	0	0	0	0	0	0	0	4	0	0
7	MF	Paul Arriola	25+1	6	2	0	0	0	0	0	0	26	6	2
8	MF	Ulises Segura	16+14	3	2	2	0	0	0	0	0	31	3	2
9	FW	Wayne Rooney	25+1	11	7	2	2	1	0	0	0	28	13	8
10	MF	Luciano Acosta	22+6	6	2	2	0	0	0	0	0	30	6	2
11	MF	Lucas Rodríguez	28+2	5	3	2	0	0	0	0	0	32	5	3
13	DF	Frédéric Brillant	30+1	1	2	2	0	0	0	0	0	33	1	2
14	FW	Ola Kamara	3+1	3	0	0	0	0	0	0	0	4	3	0
15	DF	Steve Birnbaum	31	1	1	2	0	0	0	0	0	33	1	1
17	MF	Emmanuel Boateng	0+2	0	0	0	0	0	0	0	0	2	0	0
18	MF	Felipe	6	0	1	0	0	0	0	0	0	6	0	1
19	MF	Gordon Wild	0	0	0	0	0	0	0	0	0	0	0	0
20	DF	Jalen Robinson	5+5	0	0	1+1	0	0	0	0	0	12	0	0
21	MF	Chris Durkin	7+6	1	0	1	0	0	0	0	0	14	1	0
22	FW	Griffin Yow	1+1	0	0	0+2	0	0	0	0	0	4	0	0
23	DF	Donovan Pines	9+1	0	1	0	0	0	0	0	0	10	0	1
24	GK	Bill Hamid	30	0	0	0	0	0	0	0	0	30	0	0
25	FW	Quincy Amarikwa	2+18	1	1	0+1	0	0	0	0	0	21	1	1
26	FW	Antonio Bustamante	0	0	0	2	0	0	0	0	0	2	0	0
28	DF	Joseph Mora	15+2	0	0	2	0	0	0	0	0	19	0	0
29	DF	Leonardo Jara	25+3	1	5	2	0	0	0	0	0	30	1	5
36	GK	Earl Edwards Jr.	0	0	0	0	0	0	0	0	0	0	0	0
91	DF	Oniel Fisher	0	0	0	0	0	0	0	0	0	0	0	0
Players who left the club during the season
16	MF	Chris McCann	4+2	0	0	0+1	1	0	0	0	0	7	1	0
18	MF	Zoltán Stieber	3+6	0	0	0	0	0	0	0	0	9	0	0

=== Discipline ===
No.	Pos.	Player	MLS		US Open Cup		MLS Cup		Total	
No.	Pos.	Player	Yellow card	Red card	Yellow card	Red card	Yellow card	Red card	Yellow card	Red card
1	GK	Chris Seitz	0	0	0	0	0	0	0	0
3	DF	Chris Odoi-Atsem	0	0	0	0	0	0	0	0
4	MF	Russell Canouse	5	0	0	0	0	0	5	0
5	MF	Júnior Moreno	3	1	0	0	0	0	3	1
6	DF	Marquinhos Pedroso	0	0	0	0	0	0	0	0
7	MF	Paul Arriola	6	1	0	0	0	0	6	1
8	MF	Ulises Segura	1	0	0	0	0	0	1	0
9	FW	Wayne Rooney	4	2	0	0	0	0	4	2
10	MF	Luciano Acosta	0	1	1	0	0	0	1	1
11	MF	Lucas Rodriguez	5	0	2	0	0	0	7	0
13	DF	Frédéric Brillant	5	0	0	0	0	0	5	0
14	FW	Ola Kamara	0	0	0	0	0	0	0	0
15	DF	Steve Birnbaum	5	0	0	0	0	0	5	0
17	MF	Emmanuel Boateng	0	0	0	0	0	0	0	0
18	MF	Felipe	1	0	0	0	0	0	1	0
19	MF	Gordon Wild	0	0	0	0	0	0	0	0
20	DF	Jalen Robinson	0	0	2	0	0	0	2	0
21	MF	Chris Durkin	1	0	0	0	0	0	1	0
22	FW	Griffin Yow	0	0	0	0	0	0	0	0
23	DF	Donovan Pines	1	0	0	0	0	0	1	0
24	GK	Bill Hamid	0	0	0	0	0	0	0	0
25	FW	Quincy Amarikwa	3	0	0	0	0	0	3	0
26	FW	Antonio Bustamante	0	0	0	0	0	0	0	0
28	DF	Joseph Mora	2	0	0	0	0	0	2	0
29	DF	Leonardo Jara	5	0	0	0	0	0	5	0
36	GK	Earl Edwards Jr.	0	0	0	0	0	0	0	0
91	DF	Oniel Fisher	0	0	0	0	0	0	0	0
Players who left the club during the season
16	DF	Chris McCann	0	0	0	0	0	0	0	0
18	MF	Zoltán Stieber	0	0	0	0	0	0	0	0

=== Summary ===
Competition	P	W	D	L	GF	GA	Yellow card	Red card
Major League Soccer	31	12	9	10	40	38	53	5
MLS Cup	1	0	1	0	1	5	3	1
U.S. Open Cup	2	1	0	1	3	3	5	0
Total	34	13	10	11	44	46	61	6

== Awards ==
No.	Pos.	Player	Award	Source

== Transfers and loans ==
=== Transfers in ===
No.	Pos.	Player	From	Date	Notes/Fee	Source
Winter 2018–19
36	GK	(United States) Earl Edwards Jr.	(United States) Orlando City	December 19, 2018	Traded for second-round pick in 2019 MLS SuperDraft	
11	MF	(Argentina) Lucas Rodríguez	(Argentina) Estudiantes	December 31, 2018	Loan, $50,000 GAM to Atlanta United FC for discovery rights.	
1	GK	(United States) Chris Seitz	(United States) Houston Dynamo	January 11, 2019	Acquired in three-team trade that included swapping picks in the 2020 MLS SuperDraft with the New England Revolution	
26	MF	(United States) Antonio Bustamante	(United States) William & Mary Tribe	January 21, 2019	Homegrown/Academy signing	
23	DF	(United States) Donovan Pines	(United States) Maryland Terrapins	January 23, 2019	Homegrown/Academy signing	
29	DF	(Argentina) Leonardo Jara	(Argentina) Boca Juniors	January 28, 2019	One-year loan with buyout option	
30	DF	(United States) Akeem Ward	(United States) Creighton Bluejays	January 31, 2019	Signed from draft	
25	FW	(United States) Quincy Amarikwa	(Canada) Montreal Impact	February 11, 2019	Signed as free agent	
16	DF	(Republic of Ireland) Chris McCann	(United States) Atlanta United FC	February 12, 2019	Waivers	
22	FW	(United States) Griffin Yow	(United States) D.C. United Academy	March 19, 2019	Homegrown/Academy signing	
6	DF	(Brazil) Marquinhos Pedroso	(United States) FC Dallas	May 3, 2019	Waivers	
Summer 2019
33	MF	(Germany) Gordon Wild	(United States) Atlanta United FC	July 24, 2019	Waivers	
18	MF	(Brazil) Felipe	(Canada) Vancouver Whitecaps FC	August 6, 2019	International Roster Spot and $75,000 of 2020 TAM to Vancouver Whitecaps	
17	MF	(Ghana) Emmanuel Boateng	(United States) LA Galaxy	August 7, 2019	$250,000 TAM to LA Galaxy	
14	FW	(Norway) Ola Kamara	(China) Shenzhen F.C.	August 7, 2019	$2.5M to Shenzhen, $200,000 GAM (split evenly between 2019 and 2020) to Colorado Rapids for Allocation Ranking slot	
	MF	(Argentina) Yamil Asad	(Argentina) Vélez Sarsfield	September 17, 2019	Pre-contract for 2020 season	
	MF	(United States) Moses Nyeman	(United States) D.C. United Academy	October 3, 2019	Homegrown/Academy signing	

=== MLS SuperDraft picks ===
2019 D.C. United SuperDraft Picks
Round	Selection	Player	Position	College	Status
1	14	(United States) Akeem Ward	DF	Creighton	Signed to First Team roster
3	62	(Cape Verde) Geo Alves	MF	Vermont	Released
3	72	(Japan) Shinya Kadono	MF	California	Signed to Loudoun United FC

=== Loan out ===
No.	Pos.	Player	Loaned To	Start	End	Source
21	MF	(United States) Chris Durkin	(Belgium) Sint-Truiden	August 30, 2019	June 30, 2020	

=== Transfers out ===
No.	Pos.	Player	To	Date	Notes/Fee	Source
Winter 2018–19
2	DF	(United States) Taylor Kemp	N/A	November 7, 2018	Retired	
6	DF	(United States) Kofi Opare	(United States) Colorado Rapids	November 28, 2018	Option Declined	
12	DF	(United States) Kevin Ellis	(United States) Kansas City Comets	November 28, 2018	Option Declined	
27	DF	(Lithuania) Vytas	(Lithuania) FK Sūduva	November 28, 2018	Option Declined	
25	MF	(United States) Jared Jeffrey	N/A	November 28, 2018	Retired	
29	FW	(Jamaica) Dane Kelly	(United States) Indy Eleven	November 28, 2018	Option Declined	
11	FW	(Jamaica) Darren Mattocks	(United States) FC Cincinnati	November 28, 2018	2018 MLS Expansion Draft	
23	MF	(United States) Ian Harkes	(Scotland) Dundee United	November 28, 2018	Option Declined	
32	FW	(Bolivia) Bruno Miranda	Universidad de Chile	November 28, 2018	End of loan	
48	GK	(United States) Travis Worra	N/A	November 28, 2018	Released, Retired	
14	MF	(United States) Nick DeLeon	(Canada) Toronto FC	December 14, 2018	MLS Re-Entry Draft	
22	MF	(Argentina) Yamil Asad	(Argentina) Vélez Sarsfield	January 13, 2019	End of loan	
1	GK	(Denmark) David Ousted	(United States) Chicago Fire	January 27, 2019	Waived	
Summer 2019
30	DF	(United States) Akeem Ward	(United States) Birmingham Legion	July 24, 2019	Waived	
18	AM	(Hungary) Zoltán Stieber	(Hungary) Zalaegerszegi TE	July 26, 2019	Mutual Termination	
16	DF	(Republic of Ireland) Chris McCann		July 31, 2019	Mutual Termination	

== See also ==
- 2019 Loudoun United FC season
