= Luciano Acosta =

Argentine footballer (born 1994)

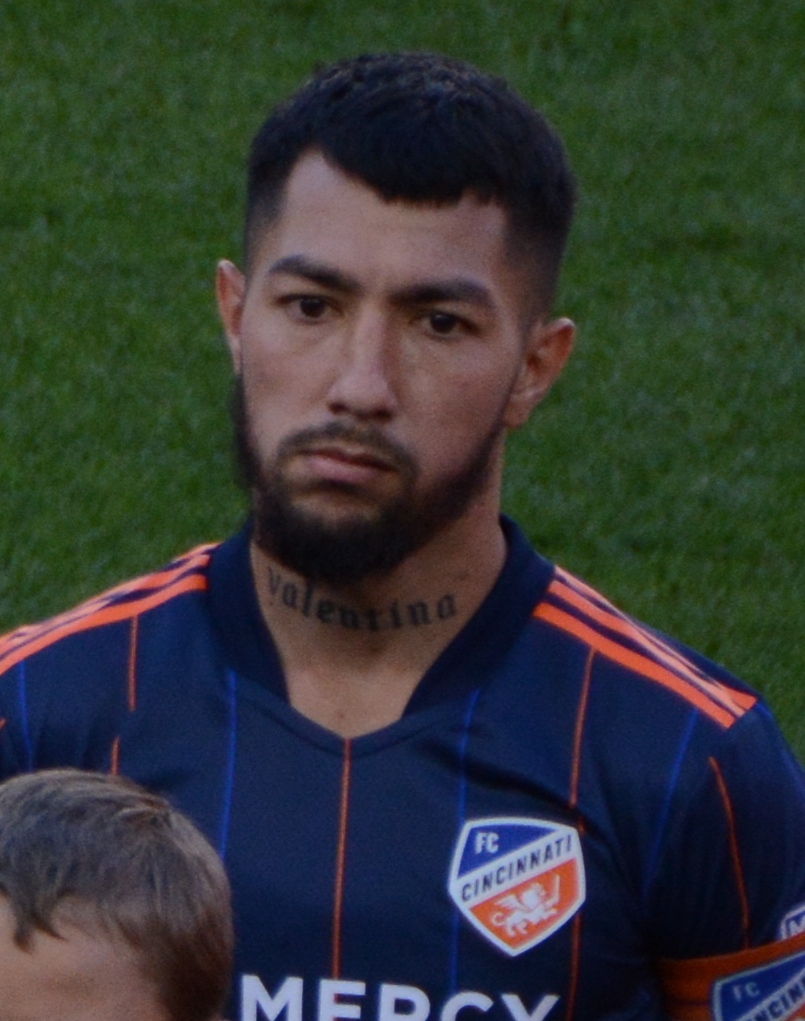
- Acosta with FC Cincinnati in 2022

Personal information
- Full name: Luciano Federico Acosta
- Date of birth: 31 May 1994 (age 32)
- Place of birth: Buenos Aires, Argentina
- Height: 1.60 m (5 ft 3 in)
- Position: Attacking midfielder

Team information
- Current team: Fluminense
- Number: 32

Youth career
- Comunicaciones
- 2007–2014: Boca Juniors

Senior career*
Years	Team	Apps	(Gls)
2014–2016	Boca Juniors	25	(2)
2015	→ Estudiantes (loan)	27	(1)
2016	→ D.C. United (loan)	31	(3)
2017–2019	D.C. United	95	(21)
2020–2021	Atlas	33	(3)
2021–2024	FC Cincinnati	125	(48)
2025	FC Dallas	21	(5)
2025–	Fluminense	27	(4)
- * Club domestic league appearances and goals as of 3 February 2026

Luciano Federico "Lucho" Acosta (born 31 May 1994) is an Argentine professional footballer who plays as an attacking midfielder for Campeonato Brasileiro Série A club Fluminense.

Acosta began his professional career with Boca Juniors and later moved to the United States. There, he played for Major League Soccer clubs D.C. United, FC Cincinnati, and FC Dallas from 2016 to 2025.

== Career ==
=== Boca Juniors ===
Acosta joined the youth ranks of the "Xeneize" club at the age of 14, after a brief stint at Club Comunicaciones. From a very young age, he faced growth issues, similar to those encountered by the successful footballer Lionel Messi. Acosta once mentioned that a medical professional told him that he would no longer grow, but he persevered by accepting his short stature.

In the youth divisions, he was for a considerable time a substitute for the current Roma player, Leandro Paredes, who at that time was regarded as the club's top youth prospect. As both played in the same position, Acosta's debut was delayed by a few years.

==== 2013–14 Argentine Primera División season ====
He would play another match, this time against Belgrano de Córdoba at home, in a game without an audience due to incidents that occurred during the 2013 Torneo Inicial. In this match, he came on as a substitute for Nahuel Zarate in the 72nd minute of the second half and scored his first goal in the top flight. However, his team would lose the match 3–2.

He played his third consecutive match as a first-division footballer, again in the same tournament, against Atlético Rafaela, where he started the match. He played his fourth match, his second consecutive one as a starter, against Estudiantes de La Plata, in a 1–0 victory for his team, where he stood out as one of the top performers of the match. He played two more matches from the start, which included a loss to Vélez in round 5 and a home victory against Olimpo, where he delivered a notable performance.

His next match was against Racing Club at El Cilindro, where his team secured a victory. In that match, he came on as a substitute and helped Boca Juniors score the winning goal.

In the next game, he started again and delivered another good performance, assisting on Emmanuel Gigliotti's goal, which gave his team a short lead.The match ended in a draw. He played another match as a starter against Quilmes.

In round 10, Boca Juniors faced River Plate, where Acosta came on in the 66th minute as a substitute for Juan Sánchez Miño, but his team lost 2–1. In the next match against Rosario Central, which ended in a 2–1 defeat, he came on as a substitute in the 72nd minute. In the following round, a 3–0 win against Godoy Cruz, he remained on the bench without playing. He returned to action in the next match, coming on as a substitute for Federico Bravo. In the subsequent 0–0 draw against San Lorenzo de Almagro, he came on in the 77th minute for Hernan Grana.

He returned to the starting lineup in round 15, in an away match against Club Atlético Tigre, where he played the full 90 minutes in a 0–1 victory for his team.

For round 16, the coach decided to start Juan Manuel Martínez, so Acosta returned to the bench but came on as a substitute and won a penalty, which Emmanuel Gigliotti converted in a 4–2 victory over Arsenal de Sarandí.

He found himself on the bench again for the matches against Club Atlético All Boys and Club Atlético Lanús. He returned to the starting lineup for the final match of the tournament, an away match against Gimnasia y Esgrima de La Plata, where he scored the goal that secured his team's victory.

This concluded his first tournament as a professional, appearing in 17 matches, alternating between starting and substitute roles, recording 2 goals and 1 assist.

=== D.C. United ===
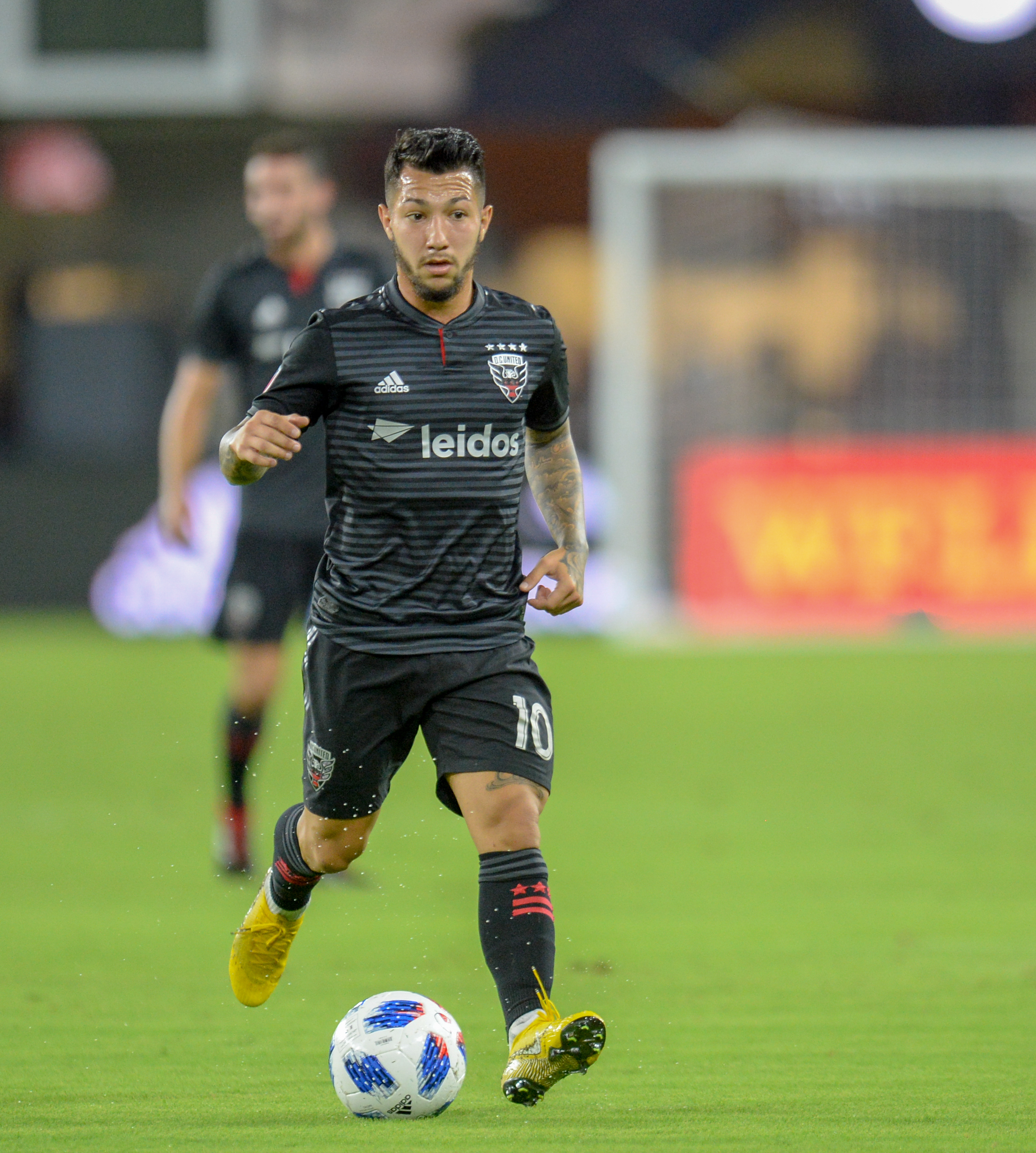
Acosta with D.C. United in 2018

In 2016, Acosta went on a season-long loan to D.C. United of Major League Soccer. Acosta made his competitive debut on in a CONCACAF Champions League quarterfinal match against Queretaro. He scored his first goal for D.C. United in the 86th minute of a league game against the New England Revolution on 23 April.

After the 2016 season, D.C. United purchased Acosta's contract outright for a club record fee. He scored his first professional hat-trick on 13 August 2018 when playing for D.C. United against Orlando City and the match ended 3–2 in favor of D.C. United. On 21 October 2018, Acosta provided an assist for Wayne Rooney following an outstanding dribble, and also scored himself in a 3–1 win over New York City FC which secured a play-off spot in the MLS Cup for D.C. United.

Since Wayne Rooney's arrival to D.C. United, Luciano and Wayne developed a good chemistry together in the field and provided goals and assists to each other. D.C. United fans nicknamed their duo "Luchoroo".

Before the 2019 season, Acosta was reported to be close to signing for Paris Saint-Germain F.C. Sources said the offer to D.C. United was under US$10 million and Acosta was scheduled to arrive at Paris for his medical. In the 2019 season, Acosta's form was declining, and was starting to get pushed out of the first team. After the 2019 season, Acosta's contract with D.C. United ended. He played his last game for D.C. on 19 October 2019, in a MLS playoff game against Toronto FC. On 12 November 2019, Acosta told an Argentine radio channel, 'La Mano de Dios', that former D.C. teammate Wayne Rooney told him he wanted to bring him to Derby County, where Rooney was going to become player-coach in 2020. Acosta left D.C. United at the end of the 2019 season when his contract expired.

=== Atlas ===
On 19 December 2019, it was announced that Acosta would join Liga MX side Atlas on 1 January 2020. Acosta scored his first goal for Atlas against Tijuana on 31 January 2020.

=== FC Cincinnati ===
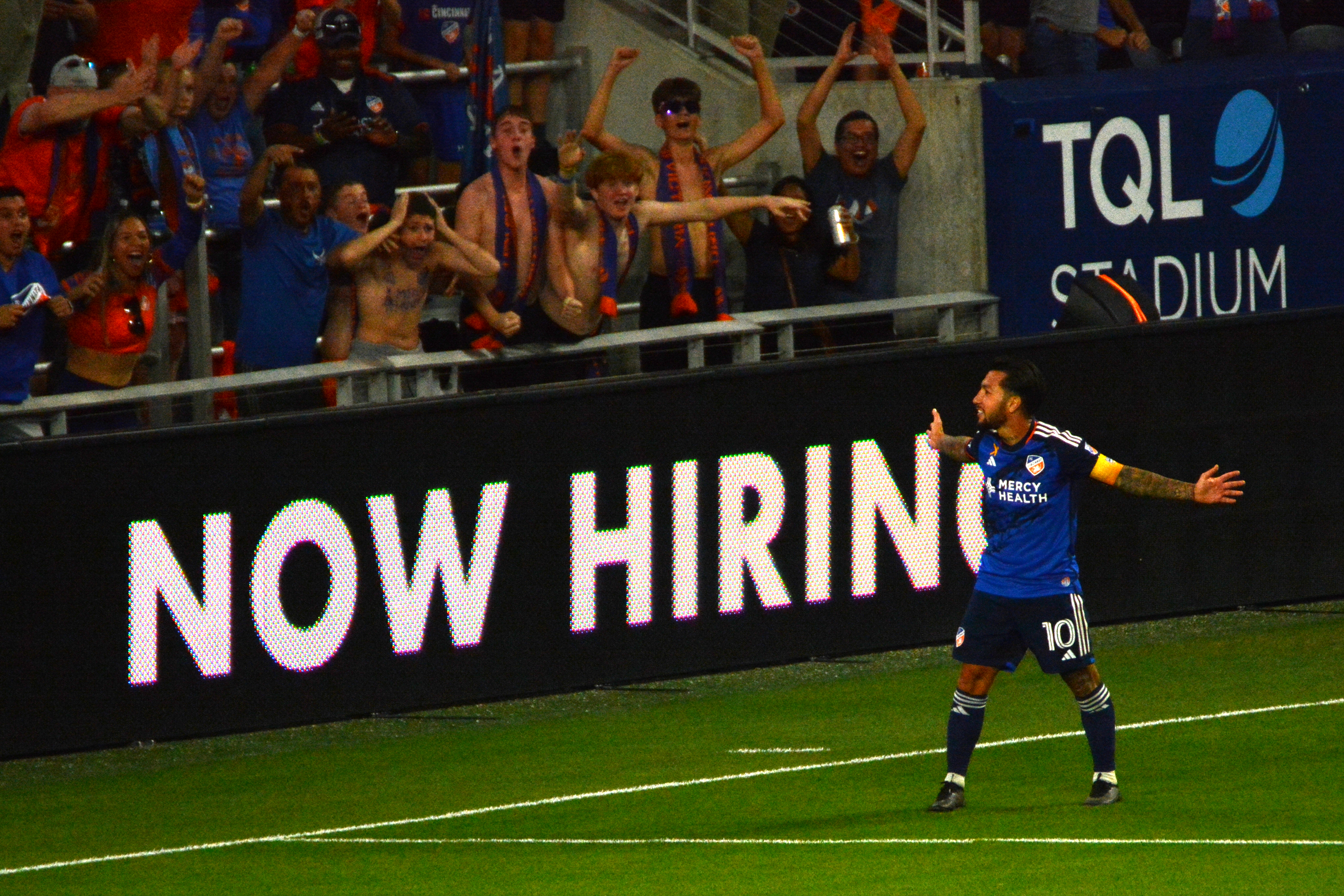
Acosta celebrates after scoring a goal in September 2023.

On 17 March 2021, Acosta returned to Major League Soccer, joining FC Cincinnati on a three-year deal as a designated player. FC Cincinnati acquired his MLS rights from D.C. United in exchange for $250,000 in General Allocation Money plus potential future incentives. He made his debut for the club on 17 April 2021 in their opener against Nashville SC. He scored in the 8th minute as FC Cincinnati drew 2–2 away.

Acosta blossomed into a star in Cincinnati; he won the MLS MVP for the 2023 season (scoring a career-high 17 goals) and was an MLS Best XI selection in three of his four seasons as an FC Cincinnati player. He led the “Orange and Blue” to their first MLS Cup playoffs in the club's MLS history, and was a main catalyst in the team's Supporters' Shield-winning campaign in 2023.

=== FC Dallas ===
On 11 February 2025, FC Dallas acquired Acosta for $5 million in a transfer with FC Cincinnati.

=== Fluminense ===
On 8 August 2025, Acosta was purchased by Fluminense for a reported $4 million plus add-ons. Lucho made his debut for the Brazilian side on 12 August, coming on as a substitute in a 2–1 Copa Sudamericana win over América de Cali. His first goal for the Tricolor came in a 2–4 loss against Red Bull Bragantino in the Brasileirão.

== Personal life ==
Acosta holds a U.S. green card, which qualifies him as a domestic player for MLS roster purposes.

== Career statistics ==
As of match played 14 December 2025

Appearances and goals by club, season and competition
Club	Season	League			National cup		Continental		Other		Total	
Club	Season	Division	Apps	Goals	Apps	Goals	Apps	Goals	Apps	Goals	Apps	Goals
Boca Juniors	2013–14	Argentine Primera División	16	2	—		—		—		16	2
Boca Juniors	2014	Argentine Primera División	9	0	—		3 (Note: Appearances in Copa Sudamericana)	0	—		12	0
Boca Juniors	Total		25	2	—		3	0	—		28	2
Estudiantes (loan)	2015	Argentine Primera División	27	1	4	0	7 (Note: Appearances in Copa Libertadores)	1	—		38	2
D.C. United (loan)	2016	MLS	31	3	1	0	2 (Note: Appearances in CONCACAF Champions League/Cup)	0	1 (Note: Appearances in MLS Cup playoffs)	0	35	3
D.C. United	2017	MLS	31	5	1	0	—		—		32	5
D.C. United	2018	MLS	33	10	2	1	—		1	0	36	11
D.C. United	2019	MLS	31	6	2	0	—		1	0	34	6
D.C. United	Total		126	24	6	1	2	0	3	0	137	25
Atlas	2019–20	Liga MX	10	1	—		—		—		10	1
Atlas	2020–21	Liga MX	23	2	—		—		—		23	2
Atlas	Total		33	3	—		—		—		33	3
FC Cincinnati	2021	MLS	31	7	—		—		—		31	7
FC Cincinnati	2022	MLS	30	10	2	0	—		2	1	34	11
FC Cincinnati	2023	MLS	32	17	5	1	—		7 (Note: Three appearances and one goal in Leagues Cup, four appearances and two goals in MLS Cup playoffs)	3	44	21
FC Cincinnati	2024	MLS	32	14	—		4	1	5 (Note: Two appearances in Leagues Cup, three appearances in MLS Cup playoffs)	0	41	15
FC Cincinnati	Total		125	48	7	1	4	1	14	4	150	54
FC Dallas	2025	MLS	21	5	2	2	—		0	0	23	7
Fluminense	2025	Série A	16	3	4	0	3 (Note: Appearances in Copa Sudamericana)	0	—		23	3
Career total			373	86	23	4	19	2	17	4	432	96

== Honours ==
FC Cincinnati

- Supporters' Shield: 2023

Individual

- MLS Most Valuable Player: 2023
- MLS top assist provider: 2022
- MLS Best XI: 2018, 2022, 2023, 2024
- MLS All-Star: 2022, 2023, 2024
- MLS Player of the Month: September 2018, June 2022, July 2023, August 2023, May 2024
- MLS Goal of the Year: 2023
- Campeonato Carioca Team of the year: 2026
