= Chris McCann =

Irish footballer (born 1987)

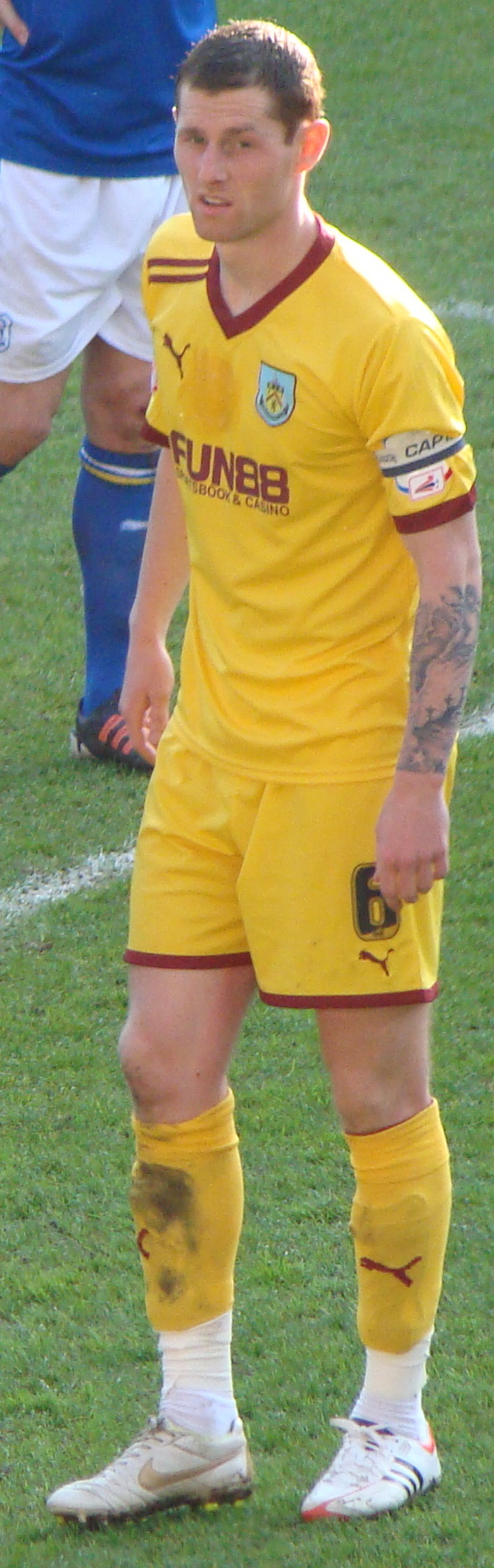
- McCann playing for Burnley in 2012

Personal information
- Full name: Christopher John McCann
- Date of birth: 21 July 1987 (age 39)
- Place of birth: Dublin, Ireland
- Height: 6 ft 1 in (1.85 m)
- Positions: Midfielder; left-back

Youth career
- –2004: Home Farm
- 2004–2005: Burnley

Senior career*
| Years | Team | Apps | (Gls) |
| 2005–2013 | Burnley | 238 | (27) |
| 2013–2016 | Wigan Athletic | 82 | (8) |
| 2016–2019 | Atlanta United | 48 | (1) |
| 2016 | → Coventry City (loan) | 13 | (1) |
| 2019 | D.C. United | 6 | (0) |
| 2019–2020 | Oldham Athletic | 16 | (0) |
| 2021–2022 | Shamrock Rovers | 37 | (0) |
| 2023 | Burton Albion | 3 | (0) |
| 2023–2025 | 1874 Northwich | 34 | (0) |
| Total | | 477 | (37) |

International career
| 2006 | Republic of Ireland U19 | 1 | (0) |
- * Club domestic league appearances and goals

Christopher John McCann (born 21 July 1987) is an Irish former professional footballer who played as a midfielder.

== Club career ==
=== Burnley ===
McCann was born in Dublin, County Dublin. He was brought over to Lancashire from the Irish club Home Farm, alongside Martin Reilly after going on a trial at Burnley earlier this year. McCann progressed through the youth system at Burnley in the 2004–05 season, reaching the Alliance Cup northern final in a losing effort.

McCann was promoted to the first team by manager Steve Cotterill in the 2005–06 pre–season matches. He made his senior debut in the 2005–06 season, coming onto the pitch as an early substitute in the 4–0 win against Coventry City on 13 August 2005. McCann scored his first senior goal on 27 September 2005, in the 3–0 win against Ipswich Town. McCann then became involved in the first team, with his playing time coming from the substitute bench. He then scored his second goal of the season, in a 1–1 draw against Queens Park Rangers on 2 January 2006. The next day on 3 January 2006, McCann signed his first professional contract with Burnley on a three-and-a-half-year contract. Following this, he said his target "was too cement a place in the club's first team". For the rest of the 2005–06 season, McCann fulfilled his target, making number of starts for Burnley. This resulted in him earning seven awards at the club's award ceremony, including the Young Player of the Year award. At the end of the 2005–06 season, he made twenty–seven appearances and scoring two times in all competitions.

Ahead of the 2006–07 season, manager Cotterill believed that players like McCann could be move to bigger clubs if the price was right. He started the 2006–07 season in the first-team squad, appearing in the first four league matches for Burnley. However, McCann was reverted to the substitutes' bench after a few games as he sought to confirm his potential at Championship level. McCann made his first start in three months against Ipswich Town on 4 November 2006 and scored the winning goal, in a 1–0 win. After the match, manager Cotterill praised his performance, saying: "I thought he was immaculate. I told them but I just thought he could do it and low and behold he didn't let me down and he certainly didn't let himself down." However, injuries saw McCann pressed into action as an emergency left-back and he took these opportunities – re-establishing himself in the first-team line-up. Three weeks later on 25 November 2006, McCann scored his second goal of the season, in a 2–1 loss against Birmingham City. He added two more goals throughout February, coming against Queens Park Rangers and Wolverhampton Wanderers. On 13 March 2007, McCann signed a three–year contract with the club, keeping him until 2010. A month later on 23 April 2007, he scored another winning goal, in a 3–2 win against West Bromwich Albion. After the match, McCann said he dedicated the goal to James O'Connor, who suffered heads to heads clash with Paul McShane and had to be substituted. For his performance, McCann won the Young Player of the Year award for the second time in a row. At the end of the 2006–07 season, he went on to make forty appearances and scoring five times in all competitions. Reflecting on his performance, Andy Lochhead said about McCann's performance, saying: "A good, young up and coming player who has seemed to improve as the season's gone on. He is versatile, has shown improvement all the time and is getting stronger and developing more. He's level headed, which is important because youngsters have got to keep their feet on the ground."

Ahead of the 2007–08 season, McCann said that his aim to secure a regular first team place in effort to rebuild his career, with manager Cotterill intended to help him to "further his development" at Burnley. He started the first seven matches of the season for the club, playing in the midfield position. McCann scored his first goal of the season, in a 2–0 win against Sheffield Wednesday on 18 September 2007. After the match, he were among four Burnley's players to be praised by manager Cotterill. However, in a follow–up match against Bristol City, McCann suffered a hamstring injury when he was fouled under a challenge and was substituted in the 20th-minute substitute, as Burnley drew 2–2. After being sidelined for two weeks, he returned to the starting line–up and played 45 minutes before being substituted, in a 2–1 loss against Cardiff City on 6 October 2007. Following his return from injury, McCann said it was time for him to grow up and be a man, due to reaching maturity. He then regained his first team place in the midfield position. Three weeks later on 27 October 2007, McCann scored his second goal of the season, in a 2–1 loss against Southampton. His third goal of the season came on 1 December 2007, in a 3–1 win against Charlton Athletic. Following the appointment of Owen Coyle as the Burnley's manager, he re-iterated his desire to keep McCann amid to the January transfer window and believed in his potential on "reaching to the very top". In a match against Preston North End on 15 December 2007, he scored an equalising goal in the 62nd minute to make it 2–2, but was sent–off two minutes later "for a two-footed challenge on Sean St Ledger", as the club went on to lose 3–2. After serving a three match suspension, McCann returned to the starting line–up, in a 3–0 loss against Blackpool on 1 January 2008. The beginning of 2008 saw the player sidelined on three occasions, due to suspension and injuries. Despite this, he returned and scored his fifth goal of the season, in a 2–0 win against Coventry City on 26 February 2008. His performance throughout the 2007–08 season was praised by Coyle, describing him as "the outstanding player on the pitch", while McCann, himself, praised him in return for giving him confidence, as well as, acknowledging his improvements. At the end of the 2007–08 season, he went on to make thirty–seven appearances and scoring five times in all competitions.

Ahead of 2008–09 season, McCann was linked with a possible move to a Premier League club, but stayed at Burnley, as he aimed to set a new target on scoring goals. His first goal of the season came on 26 August 2008 against Oldham Athletic in the second round of the League Cup, in a 3–0 win. Since the start of the 2008–09 season, McCann fully established himself in the first team, playing in the midfield position, as he considered to be "his most important season yet". McCann made his 100th league appearances for the club, in a 0–0 draw against Plymouth Argyle on 30 August 2008. Between 27 September 2008 and 18 October 2008, he contributed to assisting two goals, winning both matches against Preston North End and Watford, followed up by scoring two goals in the next two matches against Reading and Birmingham City. This led to manager Coyle commenting about McCann's progress is getting stronger and believed that he will make an impact in the league. However, in early–December, McCann suffered an illness that saw him miss two matches; where up until his illness, he started every matches since the start of the 2008–09 season. Two months prior to his illness, McCann previously suffered an injury that almost made him miss a match but he quickly recovered. McCann made his return to the starting line–up against Southampton on 13 December 2008 and helped Burnley win 3–2. Two weeks later on 26 December 2008 in a match against Barnsley, he scored the equalising goal, but then scored an own goal, which was a winning for the opposition team, as the club went on to lose 2–1. Since returning from his illness, McCann regained his first team place for the rest of the 2008–09 season. He scored his fifth goal of the season against Tottenham Hostpur in the League Cup semi-final, equalising the tie on aggregate making it 4–4 late on, and although Burnley went on to win the match 3–2 on the night, the tie finished 6–4 to Spurs on aggregate after late goals in extra time from Jermain Defoe and Roman Pavlyuchenko. McCann added two more goals in February, coming against Wolverhampton Wanderers and Sheffield Wednesday. His eighth goal of the season came on 4 April 2009, in a 1–1 draw against Derby County. He then played a part in Burnley's play off campaign which saw them promoted to the Premier League after victories over Reading, and a 1–0 Football League Championship play-off final win over Sheffield United at Wembley Stadium. McCann started the match and played 27 minute before being replaced by Joey Guðjónsson, due to injury. At the end of the 2008–09 season, he went on to make fifty–eight appearances and scoring eight times in all competitions.

With Burnley playing in the Premier League for the 2009–10 season, manager Coyle successfully predicted that McCann is destined and capable to play in top–flight football. Amid to his future at Burnley, he was in talks over a new contract by the club. On 13 August 2009, McCann officially signed a two–year contract extension with Burnley, keeping him until 2011. Two days later, he began his debut Barclays Premier League season in the opening game of the season against Stoke City and started the whole game, in a 2–0 loss. McCann, however, suffered an unfortunate knee injury and subsequent surgery to his cruciate following the game against Sunderland at Turf Moor. The injury sidelined the midfielder until December 2009 at the earliest. He spent the rest of the year, regaining his fitness following his return from injury. McCann made his return to the starting line–up against Reading in the fourth round of the FA Cup, as the club loss 1–0. In his second match back from injury, however, he picked up a second injury that ruled him out for the rest of the season. At the end of the 2009–10 season, McCann made eight appearances in all competitions.

Following Burnley's relegation from the Premier League, McCann returned to the team and played in Burnley's first three pre-season friendlies against Bury, Oldham Athletic and the first game of Burnley's tour of Singapore in which he was taken off with a knee injury. McCann played no further part in Burnley's pre-season and in the week before the Clarets season opener against Nottingham Forest, news broke that the midfielder was a doubt for this game and would be sent to see a specialist. Shortly after, it was announced that he would be out for six months after undergoing his knee surgery. McCann spent seven months recovery from his knee injury before returning to training fully in March. He made his first appearance for the club in eight months, appearing in the Burnley's reserve match, in a 3–1 win against Morecambe's reserve on 5 April 2011. While making progress on his return, McCann was offered a new contract by the club. Two weeks later on 23 April 2011, he made his first league appearance of the season against Derby County and scored his first goal for Burnley in two years, in a 4–2 win (the goal also earned him the club's goal of the season). On the last game of the season against Cardiff City, McCann captained the club for the first time in his Burnley's career, in a 1–1 draw. He went on to finish the 2010–11 season, making four appearances and scoring once in all competitions. On 30 June 2011, McCann signed a two–year contract extension with the club, keeping him until 2013.

Ahead of the 2011–12 season, McCann was named captain of Burnley by manager Eddie Howe following Graham Alexander's departure. In the club's first two matches in the League Cup, he set up a goal for Jay Rodriguez, who scored a hat–trick, in a 6–3 win against Burton Albion, which was followed up by scoring his first goal of the season, in a 3–2 win against Barnet. A month later on 27 September 2011, McCann scored his second goal of the season, in a 5–1 win against Nottingham Forest. His start of his reign as Burnley's captain started off badly, due to the club's struggling form, leading to supporters expressed concern over his responsibility as captain. But he soon received a backing from the former captain and teammate Graham Alexander. McCann then scored three goals in two matches between 29 November 2011 and 3 December 2011, scoring twice against Ipswich Town and once against West Ham United. Two weeks later on 17 December 2011, he made his 200th appearances for Burnley against Brighton & Hove Albion and helped the club win 1–0. However, during a 3–1 loss against Millwall on 25 February 2012, McCann suffered a hamstring injury and was substituted in the 39th minutes. But he quickly recovered from his hamstring injury and returned to the starting line–up, in a 3–2 loss against Watford on 3 March 2012. Throughout the 2011–12 season, McCann regained his first team place for Burnley, playing in the midfielder position while on a captain duty and played in every league matches, making fifty–one appearances and scoring five times in all competitions. Reflecting on the 2011–12 season as the club's captain, he acknowledged the "inconsistent" and "sloppy performances" on Burnley's form, but "neverthesless exceeded his expectations".

Ahead of the 2012–13 season, McCann was replaced as captain by new signing Jason Shackell. He later felt relieved to be replaced as captain, citing "it feels like a weight has been lifted" and his own concentration on the game. McCann scored his first goal of the season, in a 3–1 win against Port Vale in the first round of the League Cup. With his contract expiring at the end of the 2012–13 season, Burnley began opening talks with the player over a new contract. Two weeks later on 15 September 2012, he scored his second goal of the season, as well as, setting up one of the goals, in a 5–2 win against Peterborough United. McCann started in every matches for the club until he suffered an injury during a 2–2 draw against Millwall on 29 September 2012, resulting in him missing one match. McCann scored on his return from injury, as Burnley loss 4–3 against Crystal Palace on 6 October 2012. Two weeks later on 23 October 2012, he scored the winning goal, in a 4–3 win against Bristol City. However, McCann found himself out of the first team, due to injuries and suspension that saw him miss one match once a month between November and March. Despite this, he continued to be regain his first team place in the centre–midfield position. McCann finished the 2012–13 season, making forty–three appearances and scoring five times in all competitions.

With his contract expiring at the end of the 2012–13 season, McCann's future at Burnley was uncertain. McCann said he was happy to stay at the club. On 19 February 2013, Burnley's manager Sean Dyche revealed that he's interested to open talks with McCann over a new contract. Amid to the contract talks, he was linked with a loan move to Blackpool, but Burnley rejected the bid for him. As a months of uncertainty, it was more likely that McCann would be leaving the club, with no talks over a new contract has started. It was announced on 21 May 2013 that he would be leaving Burnley, ending his eight years association with the club.

=== Wigan Athletic ===
On 26 June 2013, McCann agreed to join Wigan Athletic following the expiry of his contract with Burnley at the end of the month, reuniting with former Burnley manager Owen Coyle. Two years prior, he was linked with a move to Bolton Wanderers, where Coyle was managing at the time. But Coyle did not opted to sign McCann and instead signed Darren Pratley. Upon joining the club, he was given a number seven shirt.

McCann made his Wigan Athletic debut, coming on as a 70th minutes substitute, in a 4–0 win against Barnsley in the opening game of the season. A month later on 19 September 2013, he made his European debut in a UEFA Europa League match against Zulte Waregem, as the club drew 0–0. On 12 December 2013, McCann received his first red card in a Wigan Athletic's shirt for second bookable offence, in a 2–1 loss against NK Maribor. Nine days later on 21 December 2013, he scored first goal for the club, in a 2–1 win against Reading. McCann scored his second goal of the season, in a 2–1 win against Cardiff City in the fifth round of the FA Cup, which was followed–up, in a 2–1 win against Brighton & Hove Albion. However, he suffered "a multiple fracture of his right knee cap" after colliding with Micah Richards, in a 2–1 win against Manchester City on 9 March 2014, and was out for the rest of the 2014–15 season. In his first season at Wigan Athletic, McCann found his playing time, coming from the substitute bench but went on to make thirty–nine appearances and scoring three times in all competitions.

The start of the 2014–15 season saw McCann continue to rehabilitate from his injury before making his return in Wigan Athletic's reserve match against Everton's reserve in a behind closed doors friendly match, playing only 60 minute. He made his first appearance of the 2014–15 season, coming on as a 84th-minute substitute, in a 1–0 loss against Brighton & Hove Albion on 4 November 2014. Three weeks later on 29 November 2014, McCann scored his first goal of the season, in a 2–1 loss against Sheffield Wednesday. Two weeks later on 13 December 2014, he scored his second goal of the season, in a 2–1 loss against Watford. However, McCann found himself out of the first team, with injuries and being placed on the substitute bench reduced his playing time. At the end of the 2014–15 season, which saw the club relegated to League One, he finished his second season with Wigan Athletic, making eighteen appearances and scoring two times in all competitions.

The start of the 2015–16 season saw McCann rotate in playing both defender and midfield positions. He scored his first goal of the season, in a 3–2 loss against Port Vale on 12 September 2015. By late–September, McCann began to play in the centre–back position. This last until on 28 November 2015 when he suffered a groin injury during a match against Southend United and was substituted in the 42nd minute, as Wigan Athletic drew 0–0. After missing two matches, McCann made his return from injury, coming on as a 67th-minute substitute, in a 3–1 win against Fleetwood Town on 28 December 2015. Two weeks later on 12 January 2016, he scored his second goal of the season, in a 3–3 draw against Sheffield United. After missing one match due to a toe injury, McCann returned to the starting line–up, playing in a right–back position, in a 1–1 draw against Crewe Alexandra on 23 January 2016. He began to play in the right–back position on four occasions until being suspended for two matches. After serving a two match suspension, McCann returned to the starting line–up, playing in the right–midfield position, against Swindon Town and set up the club's first goal of the game, in a 4–1 win on 25 March 2016. Since returning from suspension, he soon found himself placed on the substitute bench following the new signing of Stephen Warnock. But McCann found himself on the score sheet when he first score, coming against Southend United, in a 4–1 win. In a follow–up match against Blackpool, McCann scored the opener and then set up two goals, in a 4–0 win, which saw Wigan Athletic promoted to the Championship and ending the season as champions. At the end of the 2015–16 season, he made forty appearances and scoring four times in all competitions. Following this, McCann was offered a new contract by the club.

=== Atlanta United ===
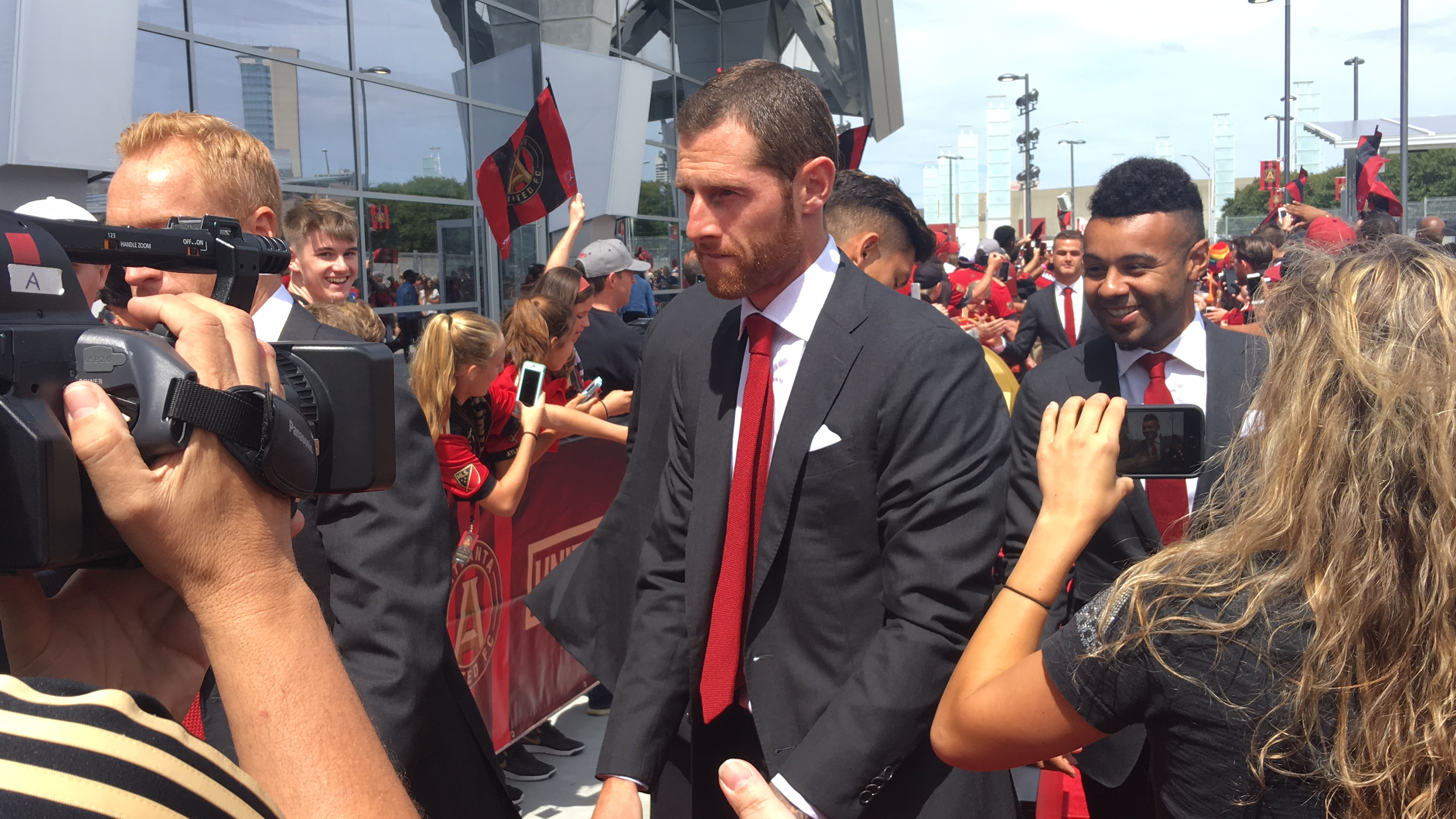
McCann at an Atlanta United's event in 2018.

On 6 July 2016, it was announced that McCann would join Atlanta United for their inaugural season in 2017. He went out on loan between the time of his signing and the beginning of the 2017 MLS season.

McCann made his debut for the club, coming on as a 77th-minute substitute, in a 6–1 victory over fellow MLS newcomers Minnesota United FC on 12 March 2017. However, he found his playing time, coming from the substitute bench. Following the injury of Greg Garza, McCann began to play in the left–back position for the rest of the 2017 season. However, during a 3–2 loss against Minnesota United FC on 4 October 2017, he suffered an injury and was substituted in the 44th minute that saw him miss one match. At the end of the 2017 season, he went on to make twenty–six appearances in all competitions.

At the start of the 2018 season, McCann began playing in both the midfield position and centre–back position. He then scored his first goal for Atlanta United from a header, in a 2–2 draw against New York City on 15 April 2018. However, McCann suffered a hamstring injury that saw him miss four matches. On 31 May 2018, he made his return from injury, starting the whole game, in a 1–1 draw against New England Revolution. However, his return was short–lived when McCann suffered a hamstring injury during a 1–1 draw against Philadelphia Union on 3 June 2018 and missed five matches as a result. On 8 July 2018, he made his return from injury, coming on as a 73rd-minute substitute, in a 2–0 win against Philadelphia Union. Since his return from injury, McCann regained his first team place, playing in the left–back position. However, he found himself out on three occasions towards the end of the 2018 season, due to injuries and suspension. Despite this, McCann made an appearance in the MLS Cup final against Portland Timbers, coming on as a late substitute, in a 2–0 win the tournament. At the end of the 2018 season, he made twenty–four appearances and scoring once in all competitions.

On 9 February 2019, McCann was waived by Atlanta United.

==== Loan to Coventry City ====
On 2 August 2016, McCann joined Coventry City on loan until the start of the 2017 Major League Soccer campaign.

He made his debut for the club, starting the whole game, in a 0–0 draw against Bury in the opening game of the season. However, in a match against Fleetwood Town on 3 September 2016, McCann suffered an injury and was substituted in the 38th minute, as Coventry City loss 2–0. On 28 September 2016, he made his return from injury, starting the whole game, in a 2–2 draw against AFC Wimbledon. In a follow–up match against Port Vale, McCann scored his first goal for the club, in a 2–0 win. His return was short–lived when he suffered a hamstring injury and was substituted in the 16th minute, in a 2–0 win against Rochdale. On 4 December 2016, McCann made his return from injury, starting a match and played 77 minutes before being substituted, in a 3–1 loss against Cambridge United in the second round of the FA Cup. On 31 December 2016, his loan spell with Coventry City ended and returned to Atlanta United.

=== D.C. United ===
McCann signed with D.C. United on 12 February 2019.

He made his debut for the club, starting the match and played 75 minutes before being substituted, in a 2–1 win against Orlando City on 31 March 2019. During a 0–0 against Montreal Impact on 9 April 2019, however, McCann suffered a muscle injury and was substituted in the 56th minute. On 16 May 2019, he made his return from injury, starting a match and played 62 minutes before being substituted, in a 0–0 draw against Toronto FC. On 12 June 2019, McCann scored his first goal for D.C. United from a header against the Philadelphia Union in the U.S. Open Cup.

D.C. United and McCann mutually parted ways on 31 July 2019. By the time he left the club, McCann made seven appearances and scoring once in all competitions.

=== Oldham Athletic ===
McCann signed with Oldham Athletic on 18 October 2019 on a short-term deal.

He made his debut for the club the next day 19 October 2019, starting the whole game, in a 1–0 defeat against Macclesfield Town. McCann then captained Oldman Athletic twice between 10 November 2019 and 13 November 2019, both in a cup competitions. In early–January, however, he suffered a knock that saw him out for a month. While rehabilitating his injury, McCann signed a contract with the club, keeping him until the end of the 2019–20 season. He made his return from injury, coming on as a late substitute, in a 3–0 win against Bradford City on 1 February 2020. Following his return, McCann received handful of starts for Oldham Athletic until the season came to a premature end due to the global pandemic COVID-19. At the end of the 2019–20 season, he made nineteen appearances in all competitions. On 1 July 2020, McCann was among nine players to be released by the club.

=== Shamrock Rovers ===
On 14 December 2020, McCann signed for the League of Ireland champions Shamrock Rovers. Upon joining the club, he said that his aim of joining Shamrock Rovers was to win trophies.

He made his debut for the club, starting the whole game, against Dundalk in the President of Ireland's Cup, losing 5–4 on penalties following a 1–1 draw. Since joining Shamrock Rovers, McCann became a first team regular, playing in the defensive midfield position. However, his first season at the club was plagued with injuries and suspension that saw his playing time reduced. Despite this, he started the match against Finn Harps on 29 October 2021 and helped the club win 3–0 to win the league for the second time in a row. At the end of the 2021 season, McCann made twenty–seven appearances in all competitions.

At the start of the 2022 season, McCann appeared as an unused substitute bench in the President of Ireland's Cup against St Patrick's Athletic, as Shamrock Rovers won 5–4 to win the match following a 1–1 draw throughout extra time. He found his second season at the club reduced, due to being on the substitute bench. However, McCann also faced his own injury concerns along the way. Despite this, his contributions in the 2022 season saw Shamrock Rovers win the league for the third consecutive time. When the 2022 season finished, McCann made twenty–two appearances in all competitions. On 2 December 2022, he was released by the club after they decided against offering him a new contract.

=== Burton Albion ===
On 4 February 2023, McCann moved back to England when he joined Burton Albion for the rest of the 2022–23 season.

McCann made his debut on the same day against Fleetwood Town and played 76 minutes before being substituted, in a 3–2 win. In his third appearance against Bristol Rovers on 18 February 2023, he suffered a knock and was substituted in the 25th minute, as the club won 2–1. After the match, manager Dino Maamria revealed that McCann suffered both a concussion and a calf injury. Even after returning from injury, McCann never played for Burton Albion again, as he made three appearances in all competitions. Following this, McCann was released by the club.

=== 1874 Northwich ===
On 25 November 2023, 1874 Northwich of the Northern Premier League Division One West announced the signing of McCann. He made his debut on the same day, in a 2–1 loss against Avro.

== Coaching career ==
On 17 December 2024, he was appointed as Lead Youth Development Phase (YDP) Coach at EFL League Two side Salford City.

== International career ==
McCann has represented the Republic of Ireland at under-17, under-18 and under-19 level.

He was first called up to the Republic of Ireland U21s for the matches against Montenegro and Bulgaria on 16 and 20 November 2007 for the 2009 European U21 Championship qualifiers. On the wake of his call-up Ireland U21 manager, Don Givens, stated that "Chris has been involved with Ireland at other age levels but this is his first call-up to the Under-21 panel. He is a good player and deserves a chance at this level". McCann was selected in the squad for the 1–0 defeat to Montenegro in Podgorica. However, he had to withdraw due to an injury. This was unexpected news as he has played the week before against Preston North End after he had miss three games with a groin injury.

McCann was again named on the bench for the second match against Bulgaria but opted out of the squad two hours prior to kick-off claiming it was a waste of his time being there. Don Givens criticised McCann saying, "I can never understand anybody that doesn't want to pull on the green shirt". He also added that this event could hinder McCann's future international career, "Will I pick him again? Would you?". Ireland went on to win the match in Athlone regardless of McCann's actions through a 90th-minute winner from the Watford midfielder John-Joe O'Toole. However, Givens later apologised for his criticism, "I take it back, its nice to see Chris developing into a player of true class". Despite smoothing things over with Givens, he was never called up to the under-21s again.

Since that event, McCann has stated his desire on three occasions to play for the full national side and hoped that his form for his club side could push him into Giovanni Trapattoni's squad, but this never happened.

== Personal ==
McCann is close friends with teammate Kyle Lafferty. Growing up, he supported Manchester United and idolised Andy Cole, who was his teammate at Burnley. On 11 June 2016, McCann married Gaynor Boult and together, they have two children.

McCann earned his U.S. green card in February 2017. This status also qualifies him as a domestic player for MLS roster purposes. He lived in the United States for three years before moving back to England, due to his wife unable to settle in the country following the birth of their second child.

== Career statistics ==
As of match played 10 February 2024

Appearances and goals by club, season and competition
| Club | Season | League | | | National cup | | League cup | | Continental | | Other | | Total | |
| Club | Season | Division | Apps | Goals | Apps | Goals | Apps | Goals | Apps | Goals | Apps | Goals | Apps | Goals |
|---|---|---|---|---|---|---|---|---|---|---|---|---|---|---|
| Burnley | 2005–06 | Championship | 23 | 2 | 1 | 0 | 3 | 0 | — | | — | | 27 | 2 |
| Burnley | 2006–07 | Championship | 38 | 5 | 1 | 0 | 1 | 0 | — | | — | | 40 | 5 |
| Burnley | 2007–08 | Championship | 35 | 5 | 1 | 0 | 1 | 0 | — | | — | | 37 | 5 |
| Burnley | 2008–09 | Championship | 44 | 6 | 4 | 0 | 7 | 2 | — | | 3 (Note: Appearances in 2009 Football League play-offs) | 0 | 58 | 8 |
| Burnley | 2009–10 | Premier League | 7 | 0 | 1 | 0 | 0 | 0 | — | | — | | 8 | 0 |
| Burnley | 2010–11 | Championship | 4 | 1 | 0 | 0 | 0 | 0 | — | | — | | 4 | 1 |
| Burnley | 2011–12 | Championship | 46 | 4 | 1 | 0 | 4 | 1 | — | | — | | 51 | 5 |
| Burnley | 2012–13 | Championship | 41 | 4 | 0 | 0 | 2 | 1 | — | | — | | 43 | 5 |
| Burnley | Total | | 238 | 27 | 9 | 0 | 18 | 4 | — | | 3 | 0 | 268 | 31 |
| Wigan Athletic | 2013–14 | Championship | 27 | 2 | 5 | 1 | 1 | 0 | 5 (Note: Appearance in UEFA Europa League) | 0 | 1 (Note: Appearance in FA Community Shield) | 0 | 39 | 3 |
| Wigan Athletic | 2014–15 | Championship | 17 | 2 | 1 | 0 | 0 | 0 | — | | — | | 18 | 2 |
| Wigan Athletic | 2015–16 | League One | 38 | 4 | 1 | 0 | 0 | 0 | — | | 1 (Note: Appearance(s) in Football League/EFL Trophy) | 0 | 40 | 4 |
| Wigan Athletic | Total | | 82 | 8 | 7 | 1 | 1 | 0 | 5 | 0 | 2 | 0 | 97 | 9 |
| Atlanta United | 2017 | MLS | 24 | 0 | 2 | 0 | — | | — | | — | | 26 | 0 |
| Atlanta United | 2018 | MLS | 24 | 1 | 0 | 0 | — | | — | | — | | 24 | 1 |
| Atlanta United | Total | | 48 | 1 | 2 | 0 | — | | — | | — | | 50 | 1 |
| Coventry City (loan) | 2016–17 | League One | 13 | 1 | 1 | 0 | 1 | 0 | — | | 3 | 0 | 18 | 1 |
| D.C. United | 2019 | MLS | 6 | 0 | 1 | 1 | — | | — | | — | | 7 | 1 |
| Oldham Athletic | 2019–20 | League Two | 16 | 0 | 2 | 0 | 0 | 0 | — | | 1 | 0 | 19 | 0 |
| Shamrock Rovers | 2021 | League of Ireland Premier Division | 24 | 0 | 1 | 0 | — | | 1 (Note: Appearance in UEFA Europa Conference League) | 0 | 1 (Note: Appearance in President of Ireland's Cup) | 0 | 27 | 0 |
| Shamrock Rovers | 2022 | League of Ireland Premier Division | 13 | 0 | 1 | 0 | — | | 8 (Note: Four appearances in UEFA Champions League; one appearance in UEFA Europa League; three appearances in UEFA Europa Conference League) | 0 | 0 | 0 | 22 | 0 |
| Shamrock Rovers | Total | | 37 | 0 | 2 | 0 | — | | 9 | 0 | 1 | 0 | 49 | 0 |
| Burton Albion | 2022–23 | League One | 3 | 0 | — | | — | | — | | — | | 3 | 0 |
| 1874 Northwich | 2023–24 | Northern Premier League Division One West | 10 | 0 | — | | — | | — | | — | | 10 | 0 |
| Career total | | | 453 | 37 | 24 | 2 | 20 | 4 | 14 | 0 | 10 | 0 | 521 | 43 |

== Honours ==
Burnley

- Football League Championship play-offs: 2009

Wigan Athletic

- Football League One: 2015–16

Atlanta United

- MLS Cup: 2018

Shamrock Rovers

- League of Ireland Premier Division: 2021, 2022
- President of Ireland's Cup: 2022
