= Russell Canouse =

American soccer player (born 1995)

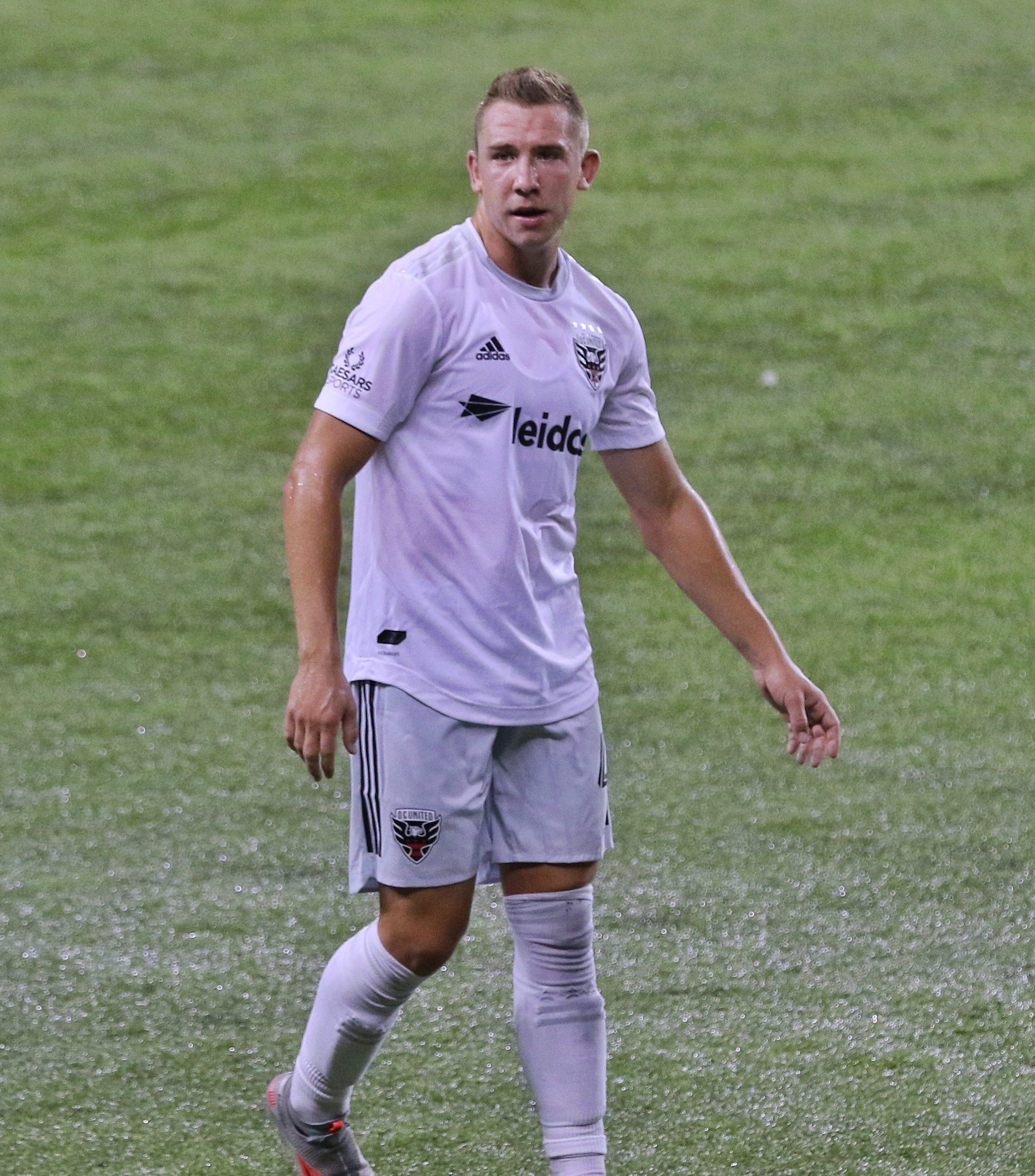
- Canouse with D.C. United in 2020

Personal information
- Full name: Russell Canouse
- Date of birth: June 11, 1995 (age 31)
- Place of birth: Lancaster, Pennsylvania, U.S.
- Height: 5 ft 10 in (1.78 m)
- Position: Midfielder

Youth career
- 2007–2008: PA Classics
- 2009–2010: New York Red Bulls
- 2011–2013: TSG 1899 Hoffenheim

Senior career*
Years	Team	Apps	(Gls)
2013–2016	TSG 1899 Hoffenheim II	51	(1)
2016–2017	TSG 1899 Hoffenheim	1	(0)
2016–2017	→ VfL Bochum (loan)	20	(1)
2017–2024	D.C. United	139	(5)

International career^{‡}
2013–2015	United States U20	15	(0)
- * Club domestic league appearances and goals as of October 29, 2024 ‡ National team caps and goals as of May 24, 2017

Russell Canouse (born June 11, 1995) is an American professional soccer player who plays as a midfielder.

== Club career ==
=== Europe ===
Canouse joined the New York Red Bulls youth academy as a teenager, before moving to Germany to pursue professional opportunities there. He made his debut for German team TSG 1899 Hoffenheim first-team on March 12, 2016, coming-on as a substitute in a Bundesliga game against VfL Wolfsburg. Canouse spent the 2016–17 season on loan at VfL Bochum.

=== D.C. United ===
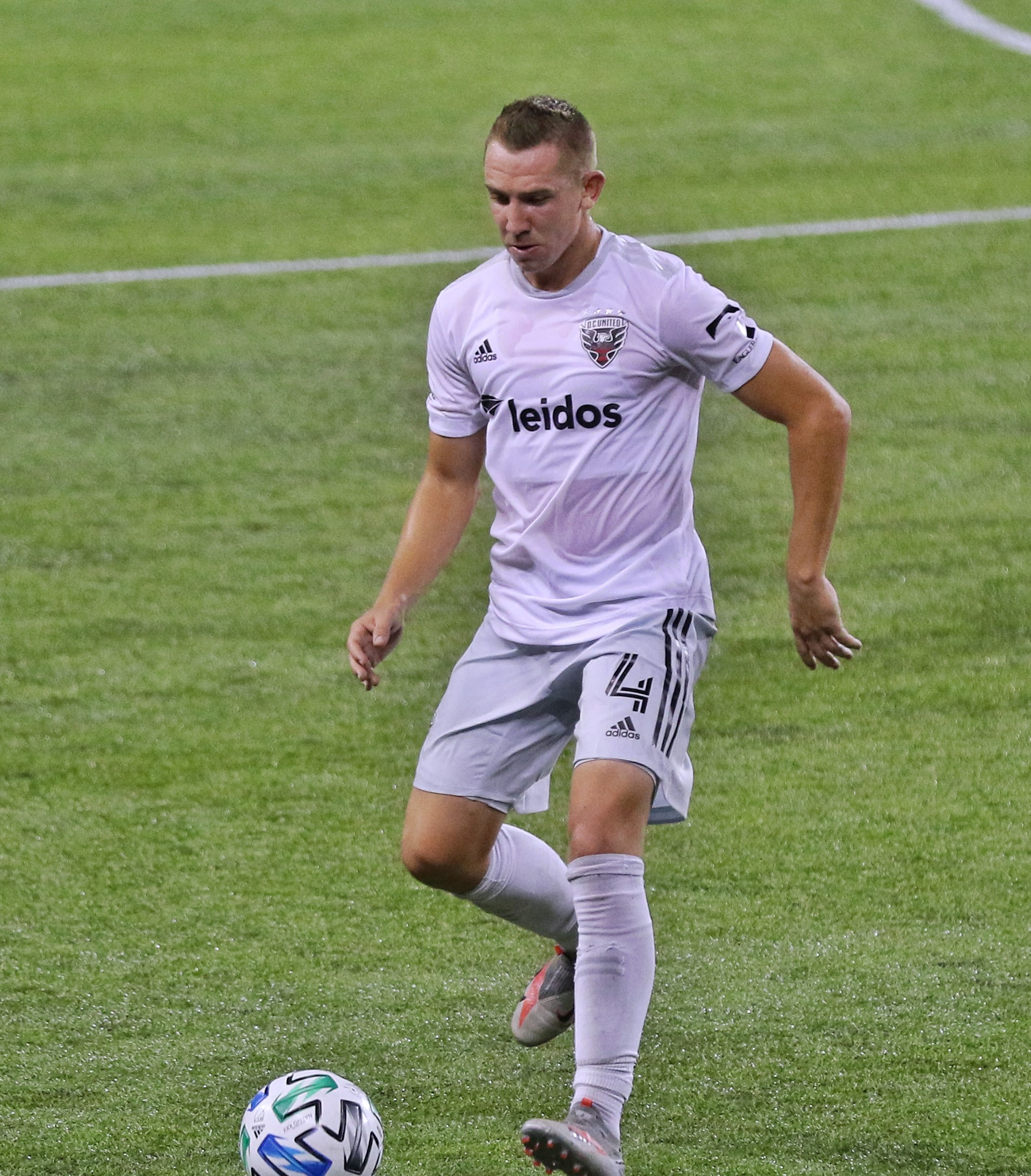
Canouse playing for D.C. United on Aug. 21, 2020

Canouse joined D.C. United of Major League Soccer in August 2017. He built a relationship with Patrick Mullins and provided him an assist against New York Red Bulls on September 27, 2017

On October 13, 2018, Canouse scored his first D.C United goal in the 86th minute against FC Dallas in a 1–0 win, putting D.C. above the playoff line.

On July 27, 2019, Canouse got injured with a collapsed lung, and was expected to be out for 3–6 weeks. After out for over a month, he came back from injury, starting against the Montreal Impact on August 31, 2019. He played as a right-back during the game, a position not familiar to Canouse, but he performed well and helped DC win 3–0 over Montreal. It was reported that 2nd Bundesliga team, Dynamo Dresden, was interested in Canouse in December 2019.

Canouse scored his second goal for United on February 29, 2020, in D.C. United's 2020 season home opener. The next week he signed a three-year contract extension with D.C. United.

D.C. United declined his contract option following their 2024 season.

== International ==
Canouse played with the U.S. national under-20 team. He captained the side at the 2015 CONCACAF under-20 Championship. He was then named to the U.S. roster for the under-20 World Cup, but had to withdraw due to injury.

On January 8, 2018, Canouse received a call-up for the United States men's national soccer team for a friendly against Bosnia and Herzegovina.

== Personal life ==
Canouse is married to Erika Canouse. Canouse has a half brother named Kyle Oster. Oster is a high quality educator and coach in Lancaster, PA. Canouse is also an officially licensed realtor with Keller Williams and is on the Next Move | Nation's Capital team which is part of the Next Move Network.

== Statistics ==
As of September 14, 2024

Club	Season	League			National cup		Other		Total	
Club	Season	Division	Apps	Goals	Apps	Goals	Apps	Goals	Apps	Goals
TSG 1899 Hoffenheim II	2013–14	Regionalliga Südwest	0	0	—		—		0	0
TSG 1899 Hoffenheim II	2014–15	Regionalliga Südwest	25	0	—		—		25	0
TSG 1899 Hoffenheim II	2015–16	Regionalliga Südwest	26	1	—		—		26	1
TSG 1899 Hoffenheim II	Total		51	1	—		—		51	1
TSG 1899 Hoffenheim	2015–16	Bundesliga	1	0	—		—		1	0
VfL Bochum	2016–17	2. Bundesliga	20	1	—		—		20	1
D.C. United	2017	MLS	10	0	—		—		10	0
D.C. United	2018	MLS	20	1	—		1 (Note: Appearance(s) in MLS Cup Playoffs)	0	21	1
D.C. United	2019	MLS	26	0	1	0	1	0	28	0
D.C. United	2020	MLS	15	2	—		—		15	2
D.C. United	2021	MLS	21	1	—		—		21	1
D.C. United	2022	MLS	18	1	—		—		18	1
D.C. United	2023	MLS	27	0	0	0	—		27	0
D.C. United	2024	MLS	2	0	0	0	—		2	0
D.C. United	Total		139	5	1	0	2	0	142	5
Career total			211	7	1	0	2	0	214	7
