= Lucas Rodríguez (footballer, born 1997) =

Argentine footballer

Personal information
- Full name: Lucas Ariel Rodríguez
- Date of birth: 27 April 1997 (age 29)
- Place of birth: Buenos Aires, Argentina
- Height: 1.70 m (5 ft 7 in)
- Positions: Winger; attacking midfielder

Youth career
- –2015: Estudiantes

Senior career*
Years	Team	Apps	(Gls)
2015–2021	Estudiantes	103	(8)
2019	→ D.C. United (loan)	33	(6)
2021–2026	Tijuana	85	(13)
2024–2026	→ Querétaro (loan)	49	(4)
- * Club domestic league appearances and goals as of 00:19, 1 February 2026 (UTC)

Lucas Ariel Rodríguez (born 27 April 1997) is an Argentine professional footballer who plays as a winger or an attacking midfielder for Liga MX club Tijuana.

== Club career ==
=== Estudiantes ===
Rodríguez is a youth exponent from Estudiantes. On 11 July 2015, he made his first-team debut in a league game against San Martín de San Juan in a 0–0 home draw. He replaced Carlos Auzqui after 78 minutes.

==== Loan to D.C. United ====
On 31 December 2018, Rodríguez signed with MLS side D.C. United on a one-year loan. He scored his first goal for DC against Real Salt Lake on 16 March 2019. He was known to be consistent and was a usual starter. In his 2019 MLS regular season, he played 33 games, scored 6 goals, and contributed 3 assists. In Round 1 of the 2019 MLS Cup Playoffs, Rodríguez scored a stoppage time equalizer against Toronto FC to extend the game into extra time. D.C. would go on to lose the game 1–5, ending their 2019 season. After Rodríguez's loan expired, D.C. negotiated for his return, but were unable to permanently sign Rodríguez from Estudiantes.

=== Tijuana ===
On 20 June 2021, Rodríguez joined Liga MX club, Tijuana.

=== Querátaro ===
On 30 June 2024, Rodríguez joined Querétaro.

== Career statistics ==
As of 9 March 2026

Appearances and goals by club, season and competition
Club	Season	League			Cup		League Cup (Note: Includes Copa de la Liga Profesional)		Continental (Note: Includes Copa Sudamericana and Copa Libertadores)		Other (Note: Includes Copa de la Superliga and Leagues Cup)		Total	
Club	Season	Division	Apps	Goals	Apps	Goals	Apps	Goals	Apps	Goals	Apps	Goals	Apps	Goals
Estudiantes	2015	Argentine Primera División	11	3	1	0	—		—		—		12	3
Estudiantes	2016	Argentine Primera División	10	0	1	1	—		2	0	—		13	1
Estudiantes	2016–17	Argentine Primera División	26	3	1	1	—		4	0	—		31	4
Estudiantes	2017–18	Argentine Primera División	22	1	3	1	—		4	1	—		29	3
Estudiantes	2018–19	Argentine Primera División	15	0	0	0	—		8	1	—		23	1
Estudiantes	2019–20	Argentine Primera División	7	0	0	0	9	1	—		—		16	1
Estudiantes	2020–21	Argentine Primera División	0	0	0	0	10	1	—		1	0	11	1
Estudiantes	Total		91	7	6	3	19	2	10	2	1	0	127	14
D.C. United (loan)	2019	Major League Soccer	34	7	2	0	—		—		—		36	7
Tijuana	2021–22	Liga MX	28	4	—		—		—		—		28	4
Tijuana	2022–23	Liga MX	28	6	—		—		—		—		28	6
Tijuana	2023–24	Liga MX	29	3	—		—		—		2	0	31	3
Tijuana	Total		59	13	0	0	0	0	0	0	2	0	61	13
Querétaro	2024–25	Liga MX	29	2	—		—		—		2	0	31	2
Querétaro	2025–26	Liga MX	23	2	—		—		—		2	0	25	2
Querétaro	Total		52	4	0	0	0	0	0	0	4	0	56	4
Career total			236	31	8	3	19	2	10	2	7	0	280	38

== International career ==
Rodríguez previously played for the Argentina national U-17 football team. On 25 September 2019 Rodríguez was called up to the Argentina national under-23 football team for friendlies against Mexico on 9 and 14 October.17
