= Antonio Bustamante =

Bolivian-American footballer (born 1997)

Personal information
- Date of birth: June 20, 1997 (age 29)
- Place of birth: Fairfax, Virginia, United States
- Height: 1.70 m (5 ft 7 in)
- Position: Midfielder

Youth career
- 2012–2015: D.C. United

College career
Years	Team	Apps	(Gls)
2015–2018	William & Mary Tribe	68	(34)

Senior career*
Years	Team	Apps	(Gls)
2019	D.C. United	0	(0)
2019	→ Loudoun United (loan)	26	(5)
2020	Blooming	0	(0)
2020–2021	Náutico	2	(0)
2021–2022	Thisted	40	(7)
2023	B.93	15	(0)
2024	Aurora	25	(6)

International career^{‡}
2020	Bolivia U23	4	(0)
2020	Bolivia	2	(0)
- * Club domestic league appearances and goals as of 31 December 2024 ‡ National team caps and goals as of 10 October 2020

Antonio Bustamante (born June 20, 1997) is a Bolivian footballer who plays as a midfielder. Born in the United States, Bustamante represents the Bolivia national team.

== Career ==
=== D.C. United ===
On January 21, 2019, Antonio signed a homegrown contract with D.C. United. Antonio had his first start for D.C. against the Philadelphia Union on June 12, 2019, in a U.S. Open Cup match. After the 2019 season, D.C. United did not exercise Bustamante's contract option.

==== Loudoun United ====
Bustamante was loaned to D.C. United's USL team, Loudoun United before their inaugural season. Bustamante was rewarded Man of the Match after scoring one goal and assisting a goal against Louisville City FC on July 28, 2019. He played 2,133 minutes in his one season with Loudoun.

=== Club Blooming ===
Bustamante joined Club Blooming in March 2020.

=== Club Náutico Capibaribe ===
In 2020, Bustamante was loaned out to Club Náutico Capibaribe.

=== Thisted FC ===
On 11 September 2021, Bustamante joined Danish 2nd Division club Thisted FC. Bustamente left the Danish club at the end of 2022.

=== B.93 ===
On transfer deadline day, 31 January 2023, Bustamante joined another Danish 2nd Division club, B.93.

== International career ==
Bustamante was called up by César Farías to play with the Bolivia national under-23 football team in the 2020 CONMEBOL Pre-Olympic Tournament. Bustamante made his first international appearance as a substitute in the 60th minute of the opening match against Paraguay's own U23 side.

On 9 October 2020, Bustamante debuted for the senior Bolivia national team in a 5–0 2022 FIFA World Cup qualification defeat to Brazil.
