= 2019 MLS Cup playoffs =

2019 edition of the MLS playoffs

Tournament details
- Country: United States; Canada
- Dates: October 19 – November 10
- Teams: 14

Final positions
- Champions: Seattle Sounders FC (2nd title)
- Runners-up: Toronto FC
- Semifinalists: Atlanta United FC; Los Angeles FC

Tournament statistics
- Matches played: 13
- Goals scored: 53 (4.08 per match)
- Attendance: 442,476 (34,037 per match)
- Top goal scorer(s): (Peru) Raúl Ruidíaz (4 goals)

The 2019 MLS Cup playoffs (branded as the Audi 2019 MLS Cup Playoffs for sponsorship reasons) was the post-season championship of Major League Soccer (MLS), the top soccer league in the United States and Canada. It was the 24th edition of the MLS Cup playoffs, the tournament culminating at the end of the 2019 regular season. The playoffs began on October 19, 2019, and concluded with MLS Cup 2019 on November 10.

The playoffs were contested by fourteen teams under a new format, with the top seven teams from both conferences qualifying based on their regular season performances. All rounds used single-elimination matches that were hosted by the higher remaining seed, and no rounds would be re-seeded unlike previous years. As a result, the playoffs were played over a 23-day period without interruptions from an international break, as was previously the case.

The first round (October 19–20) featured the second through seventh-seeded teams in each conference playing each other, with the first-placed teams in each conference receiving a bye. The winners of the first round advanced to the conference semifinals (October 23–24) along with the first-placed team from each conference. The winners of the conference semifinals then advanced to the conference finals (October 29–30) for an MLS Cup berth.

Atlanta United FC were the defending MLS Cup champions, having won their first title in 2018, but were eliminated by Toronto FC in the conference finals. The 2019 regular season Supporters' Shield champions were Los Angeles FC, but they were also eliminated in the conference finals, by Seattle Sounders FC. For the first time in league history, the four conference finalists were all expansion teams and did not feature any of the ten original teams from the inaugural season.

Seattle hosted MLS Cup 2019 at CenturyLink Field in Seattle, Washington, and defeated Toronto FC 3–1 for their second title, in what was the two sides' third meeting in MLS Cup across the last four seasons.

== Qualified teams ==
Eastern Conference

- Atlanta United FC
- D.C. United
- New England Revolution
- New York City FC
- New York Red Bulls
- Philadelphia Union
- Toronto FC

Western Conference

- FC Dallas
- LA Galaxy
- Los Angeles FC
- Minnesota United FC
- Portland Timbers
- Real Salt Lake
- Seattle Sounders FC

== Conference standings ==
The top seven teams from each conference advanced to the MLS Cup playoffs, with the top team in each conference receiving a first-round bye. Background colors denote playoff teams.

Eastern Conference

2019 MLS Eastern Conference standings
Pos	Team	Pld	Pts
1	New York City FC	34	64
2	Atlanta United FC	34	58
3	Philadelphia Union	34	55
4	Toronto FC	34	50
5	D.C. United	34	50
6	New York Red Bulls	34	48
7	New England Revolution	34	45
8	Chicago Fire	34	42
9	Montreal Impact	34	41
10	Columbus Crew SC	34	38
11	Orlando City SC	34	37
12	FC Cincinnati	34	24

Source: MLS

Western Conference

2019 MLS Western Conference standings
Pos	Team	Pld	Pts
1	Los Angeles FC	34	72
2	Seattle Sounders FC	34	56
3	Real Salt Lake	34	53
4	Minnesota United FC	34	53
5	LA Galaxy	34	51
6	Portland Timbers	34	49
7	FC Dallas	34	48
8	San Jose Earthquakes	34	44
9	Colorado Rapids	34	42
10	Houston Dynamo	34	40
11	Sporting Kansas City	34	38
12	Vancouver Whitecaps FC	34	34

Source: MLS

== Bracket ==
First round October 19–20	Conference semifinals October 23–24
E1	New York City FC	1
E4	Toronto FC	2
E4	Toronto FC (a.e.t.)	5
E5	D.C. United	1
Eastern Conference
E2	Atlanta United FC	1
E7	New England Revolution	0
E2	Atlanta United FC	2
E3	Philadelphia Union	0
E3	Philadelphia Union (a.e.t.)	4
E6	New York Red Bulls	3
W1	Los Angeles FC	5
W5	LA Galaxy	3
W4	Minnesota United FC	1
W5	LA Galaxy	2
Western Conference
W2	Seattle Sounders FC (a.e.t.)	4
W7	FC Dallas	3
W2	Seattle Sounders FC	2
W3	Real Salt Lake	0
W3	Real Salt Lake	2
W6	Portland Timbers	1

Conference finals October 29–30
E4	Toronto FC	2
E2	Atlanta United FC	1
W1	Los Angeles FC	1
W2	Seattle Sounders FC	3

MLS Cup; November 10
E4	Toronto FC	1
W2	Seattle Sounders FC	3

Note: The higher seeded team hosted matches, with the MLS Cup host determined by overall points.
Source: 2019 MLS Cup Playoffs Bracket

== First round ==
=== Eastern Conference ===
In the opening match of the playoffs, defending champions Atlanta United FC hosted the New England Revolution in a rematch of the final regular season match they played two weeks prior. The match was scoreless through the first half and after half-time until a formation change and substitutions by Atlanta manager Frank de Boer allowed the hosts to score. Defender Franco Escobar finished a through ball from Ezequiel Barco with a one-time shot in the 70th minute, which gave Atlanta the 1–0 victory.

Fourth-seeded Toronto FC hosted the fifth seed, D.C. United, at BMO Field in the second Eastern Conference playoffs match. Toronto took a lead in the first half through a goalkeeping error by Bill Hamid that resulted in a successful chance for Mark Delgado, but D.C. equalized in second half stoppage time with a sequence on a Wayne Rooney corner kick that ended with a goal for Lucas Rodríguez. Toronto scored four unanswered goals in extra time, advancing with a 5–1 victory, with two goals from Jonathan Osorio and one apiece from Richie Laryea and Nick DeLeon.

The Philadelphia Union hosted the New York Red Bulls on the following day and fell behind with a 3–1 halftime lead for the visitors, who took advantage of mistakes by goalkeeper Andre Blake. The Union responded with two unanswered goals in the second half to tie the match at full time. In first half stoppage time during extra time, substitute Marco Fabián scored from a chipped shot that gave the Union a 4–3 win, their first playoffs victory.

October 19
1:00 pm EDT

Atlanta United FC	1–0	New England Revolution
Escobar 70'	Report

Mercedes-Benz Stadium, Atlanta, Georgia
Attendance: 66,114
Referee: Kevin Stott

October 19
6:00 pm EDT

Toronto FC	5–1 (a.e.t.)	D.C. United
Delgado 32'; Laryea 93'; Osorio 95', 103'; DeLeon 105+1'	Report	Rodríguez 90+3'

BMO Field, Toronto, Ontario
Attendance: 25,331
Referee: Allen Chapman

October 20
3:00 pm EDT

Philadelphia Union	4–3 (a.e.t.)	New York Red Bulls
Bedoya 30'; Elliott 52'; Picault 78'; Fabián 105+1'	Report	Sims 6'; Parker 24'; Barlow 45+4'

Talen Energy Stadium, Chester, Pennsylvania
Attendance: 18,530
Referee: Chris Penso

=== Western Conference ===
October 19
12:30 pm PDT

Seattle Sounders FC	4–3 (a.e.t.)	FC Dallas
Ruidíaz 18'; Morris 22', 74', 113'	Report	Cannon 39'; Hedges 64'; Acosta 82'

CenturyLink Field, Seattle, Washington
Attendance: 37,722
Referee: Nima Saghafi

October 19
8:00 pm MDT

Real Salt Lake	2–1	Portland Timbers
Kreilach 28'; Savarino 87'	Report	Asprilla 47'

Rio Tinto Stadium, Sandy, Utah
Attendance: 17,452
Referee: Ismail Elfath

October 20
7:30 pm CDT

Minnesota United FC	1–2	LA Galaxy
Greguš 87'	Report	Lletget 71'; Dos Santos 75'

Allianz Field, Saint Paul, Minnesota
Attendance: 19,939
Referee: Ted Unkel

== Conference semifinals ==
=== Eastern Conference ===
October 23
7:00 pm EDT

New York City FC	1–2	Toronto FC
Tajouri-Shradi 69'	Report	Pozuelo 47', 90' (pen.)

Citi Field (Note: New York City FC hosted their Eastern Conference semifinal playoff match at Citi Field in New York City. Yankee Stadium was not available due to the New York Yankees advancing to the 2019 American League Championship Series.), New York City, New York
Attendance: 19,829
Referee: Jair Marrufo

October 24
7:30 pm EDT

Atlanta United FC	2–0	Philadelphia Union
Gressel 10'; J. Martínez 80'	Report

Mercedes-Benz Stadium, Atlanta, Georgia
Attendance: 41,507
Referee: Ismail Elfath

=== Western Conference ===
October 23
7:00 pm PDT

Seattle Sounders FC	2–0	Real Salt Lake
Svensson 64'; Lodeiro 81'	Report

CenturyLink Field, Seattle, Washington
Attendance: 37,722
Referee: Alan Kelly

October 24
7:30 pm PDT

Los Angeles FC	5–3	LA Galaxy
Vela 16', 40'; Rossi 66'; Diomande 68', 80'	Report	Pavón 41'; Ibrahimović 55'; Feltscher 77'

Banc of California Stadium, Los Angeles, California
Attendance: 22,902
Referee: Kevin Stott

== Conference finals ==
=== Eastern Conference ===
October 30
8:00 pm EDT

Atlanta United FC	1–2	Toronto FC
Gressel 4'	Report	Benezet 14'; DeLeon 78'

Mercedes-Benz Stadium, Atlanta, Georgia
Attendance: 44,055
Referee: Alan Kelly

=== Western Conference ===
October 29
7:00 pm PDT

Los Angeles FC	1–3	Seattle Sounders FC
Atuesta 17'	Report	Ruidíaz 22', 64'; Lodeiro 26'

Banc of California Stadium, Los Angeles, California
Attendance: 22,099
Referee: Jair Marrufo

== MLS Cup 2019 ==
November 10, 2019
12:00 p.m. PST

Seattle Sounders FC	3–1	Toronto FC
Leerdam 57'; Rodríguez 76'; Ruidíaz 90'	Report	Altidore 90+3'

CenturyLink Field, Seattle, Washington
Attendance: 69,274
Referee: Allen Chapman

== Top goalscorers ==
There were 53 goals scored in 13 matches, with an average of 4.08 goals per match.

Rank	Player	Club	Goals
1	(Peru) Raúl Ruidíaz	Seattle Sounders FC	4
2	(United States) Jordan Morris	Seattle Sounders FC	3
3	(United States) Nick DeLeon	Toronto FC	2
3	(Norway) Adama Diomande	Los Angeles FC	2
3	(Germany) Julian Gressel	Atlanta United FC	2
3	(Uruguay) Nicolás Lodeiro	Seattle Sounders FC	2
3	(Canada) Jonathan Osorio	Toronto FC	2
3	(Spain) Alejandro Pozuelo	Toronto FC	2
3	(Mexico) Carlos Vela	Los Angeles FC	2
