= 2019 Atlanta United FC season =

Atlanta United FC
2019 season
- Owner: Arthur Blank
- President: Darren Eales
- Head coach: Frank de Boer
- Stadium: Mercedes-Benz Stadium; Atlanta, Georgia
- MLS: Conference: 2nd Overall: 3rd
- MLS Cup playoffs: Conference finals
- U.S. Open Cup: Winners
- Champions League: Quarter-finals
- Campeones Cup: Winners
- Top goalscorer: League: Josef Martínez (27); All: Josef Martínez (33)
- Highest home attendance: League/All: 72,548 (August 3 vs. LA Galaxy)
- Lowest home attendance: League: 42,537 (May 8 vs. Toronto FC); All: 7,523 (July 10 vs. Saint Louis FC)
- Average home league attendance: 52,510 (league - regular season); 47,053 (all)
- Biggest win: 5 goals: ATL 5–0 HOU (July 17)
- Biggest defeat: 4 goals: CHI 5–1 ATL (July 3)
Home colors	Away colors
- All statistics correct as of October 31, 2019.

The 2019 Atlanta United FC season was the third season of Atlanta United FC's existence, and the eleventh year that a professional soccer club from Atlanta, Georgia competed in the top division of American soccer. Atlanta United played their home matches at Mercedes-Benz Stadium. Outside of MLS, the team made their first appearance in the CONCACAF Champions League and the Campeones Cup (beating Club América to become the first MLS team to win the latter) and won the 2019 U.S. Open Cup by beating Minnesota United FC 2–1. This marked the team's first year without former head coach Gerardo "Tata" Martino, who was replaced with Frank de Boer.

== Club ==
Squad no.	Name	Nationality	Position(s)	Date of birth (age)	Previous club	Apps	Goals
Goalkeepers
1	Brad Guzan (3rd Captain)	(United States)	GK	September 9, 1984 (age 42)	(England) Middlesbrough	98	0
13	Brendan Moore	(United States)	GK	April 16, 1992 (age 34)	(England) Rochdale	0	0
25	Alec Kann	(United States)	GK	August 8, 1990 (age 36)	(United States) Sporting Kansas City	25	0
Defenders
2	Franco Escobar	(Argentina)	RB	February 21, 1995 (age 31)	(Argentina) Newell's Old Boys	62	5
3	Michael Parkhurst (Captain)	(United States)	CB	January 24, 1984 (age 42)	(United States) Columbus Crew	100	0
4	Florentin Pogba	(Guinea)	CB	August 19, 1990 (age 36)	(Turkey) Gençlerbirliği	22	0
5	Leandro González Pírez	(Argentina)	CB	February 26, 1992 (age 34)	(Argentina) Estudiantes	115	4
12	Miles Robinson (GA)	(United States)	CB	March 14, 1997 (age 29)	(United States) Syracuse University	59	1
20	Brek Shea	(United States)	LB	February 28, 1990 (age 36)	(Canada) Vancouver Whitecaps FC	24	0
21	George Bello (HGP)	(United States)	LB	January 22, 2002 (age 24)	(United States) Atlanta United Academy	4	1
22	Mikey Ambrose	(United States)	LB	October 5, 1993 (age 32)	(United States) Orlando City SC	27	0
Midfielders
6	Darlington Nagbe	(United States)	AM	July 19, 1990 (age 36)	(United States) Portland Timbers	74	2
8	Ezequiel Barco (DP)	(Argentina)	AM	March 23, 1999 (age 27)	(Argentina) Independiente	59	9
10	Pity Martínez (DP)	(Argentina)	AM	June 13, 1993 (age 33)	(Argentina) River Plate	44	7
11	Eric Remedi	(Argentina)	DM	June 4, 1995 (age 31)	(Argentina) Banfield	56	2
14	Justin Meram	(Iraq)	LW	December 4, 1988 (age 37)	(United States) Columbus Crew	27	4
15	Héctor Villalba	(Paraguay)	RW	July 26, 1994 (age 32)	(Argentina) San Lorenzo	96	22
16	Emerson Hyndman	(United States)	CM	April 9, 1996 (age 30)	(England) AFC Bournemouth	21	3
18	Jeff Larentowicz (Vice Captain)	(United States)	DM	August 5, 1983 (age 43)	(United States) LA Galaxy	110	3
24	Julian Gressel	(Germany)	AM	December 16, 1993 (age 32)	(United States) Providence College	118	20
27	Chris Goslin (HGP)	(United States)	AM	May 12, 2000 (age 26)	(United States) Atlanta United Academy	1	0
28	Dion Pereira	(England)	LW	March 25, 1999 (age 27)	(England) Watford	21	0
29	Mo Adams (GA)	(England)	CM	September 23, 1996 (age 29)	(United States) Chicago Fire	6	1
30	Andrew Carleton (HGP)	(United States)	LW	June 22, 2000 (age 26)	(United States) Atlanta United Academy	17	1
31	Luiz Fernando	(Brazil)	LW	June 23, 1997 (age 29)	(United States) Atlanta United 2	0	0
32	Kevin Kratz	(Germany)	CM	January 21, 1987 (age 39)	(United States) Philadelphia Union	54	4
Forwards
7	Josef Martínez (DP)	(Venezuela)	CF	May 19, 1993 (age 33)	(Italy) Torino	100	88
19	Brandon Vázquez	(United States)	CF	October 14, 1998 (age 27)	(Mexico) Tijuana	39	9

=== International roster slots ===
Atlanta had seven International Roster Slots for use at the end of the season. José Hernández did not occupy an international slot while he was on loan to Atlanta United 2. Julian Gressel and Gordon Wild received green cards in May, making them domestic players for MLS roster purposes. On July 1, Atlanta traded an international slot to FC Dallas until the end of the 2020 season as part of a package for Emerson Hyndman's discovery rights. On August 21, Luiz Fernando was added to the senior team roster, occupying Atlanta's last international slot.

Atlanta United International Roster Slots
Slot	Player	Country
1	Ezequiel Barco	Argentina
2	Franco Escobar	Argentina
3	Pity Martínez	Argentina
4	Dion Pereira	England
5	Florentin Pogba	Guinea
6	Eric Remedi	Argentina
7	Luiz Fernando	Brazil

== Results ==
=== Non-competitive ===
Win Draw Loss

==== Friendlies ====
February 2, 2019 Friendly	Seattle Sounders FC	1–7	Atlanta United	Fullerton, California
2:00 p.m. EST	Serrano 88'	Report	J. Martínez 13', 46'; G. Martínez 30+1' (pen.); Pereira 72', 109'; Williams 95', 101'	Stadium: Titan Stadium; Attendance: 0
Note: Match was played behind closed doors in four 30 minute periods or quarters.

February 6, 2019 Friendly	Tijuana	1–6	Atlanta United	Fullerton, California
3:30 p.m. EST	Torres 27'	Report	J. Martínez 6', 16', 43', 68'; Villalba 20'; Barco 52'	Stadium: Titan Stadium; Attendance: 0
Note: Match was played behind closed doors in two 40 minute periods or halves.

February 10, 2019 Friendly	Los Angeles FC	2–2	Atlanta United	Los Angeles, California
4:00 p.m. EST	Perez 58'; Vela 82'	Report	G. Martínez 18'; Gressel 29'	Stadium: Banc of California Stadium; Attendance: 0
Note: Match was played behind closed doors.

February 13, 2019 Friendly	LA Galaxy	0–0	Atlanta United	Carson, California
3:00 p.m. EST		Report		Stadium: Dignity Health Sports Park; Attendance: 0
Note: Match was played behind closed doors.

=== Competitive ===
==== Major League Soccer ====
===== League tables =====
====== Eastern Conference ======
2019 MLS Eastern Conference standings
Pos	Team	Pld	W	L	T	GF	GA	GD	Pts	Qualification
1	New York City FC	34	18	6	10	63	42	+21	64	MLS Cup Conference Semifinals
2	Atlanta United FC	34	18	12	4	58	43	+15	58	MLS Cup First Round
3	Philadelphia Union	34	16	11	7	58	50	+8	55	MLS Cup First Round
4	Toronto FC	34	13	10	11	57	52	+5	50	MLS Cup First Round
5	D.C. United	34	13	10	11	42	38	+4	50	MLS Cup First Round

Source: MLS
Rules for classification: 1) points; 2) total wins; 3) total goal differential; 4) total goals scored; 5) disciplinary points; 6) away goal differential; 7) away goals scored; 8) home goals scored; 9) home goal differential; 10) coin toss or drawing of lots.

====== Overall ======
2019 MLS regular season standings
Pos	Team	Pld	W	L	T	GF	GA	GD	Pts	Qualification
1	Los Angeles FC (S)	34	21	4	9	85	37	+48	72	CONCACAF Champions League
2	New York City FC	34	18	6	10	63	42	+21	64	CONCACAF Champions League
3	Atlanta United FC	34	18	12	4	58	43	+15	58	CONCACAF Champions League
4	Seattle Sounders FC (C)	34	16	10	8	52	49	+3	56	CONCACAF Champions League
5	Philadelphia Union	34	16	11	7	58	50	+8	55	

Source: MLS
Rules for classification: 1) points; 2) total wins; 3) total goal differential; 4) total goals scored; 5) disciplinary points; 6) away goals scored; 7) away goal differential; 8) coin toss or drawing of lots
(C) MLS Cup champion; (S) Supporters' Shield winner

===== Results summary =====
Overall								Home						Away					
Pld	W	D	L	GF	GA	GD	Pts	W	D	L	GF	GA	GD	W	D	L	GF	GA	GD
34	18	4	12	58	43	+15	58	12	3	2	36	14	+22	6	1	10	22	29	−7

Source: Match reports

===== Results by round =====
Round	1	2	3	4	5	6	7	8	9	10	11	12	13	14	15	16	17	18	19	20	21	22	23	24	25	26	27	28	29	30	31	32	33	34
Stadium	A	H	H	A	A	H	H	A	H	H	A	A	A	H	H	A	H	A	H	A	H	H	A	H	H	A	A	A	H	A	H	A	A	H
Result	L	D	D	L	W	L	W	W	W	W	W	L	L	W	W	L	W	L	D	L	W	W	L	W	W	W	W	L	L	W	W	L	D	W
Position (conf.)	11	10	9	12	10	11	10	9	7	5	3	4	5	4	3	4	4	4	3	4	2	2	2	2	2	1	1	3	3	3	2	3	2	2
Position (league)	23	19	18	20	18	20	18	15	13	9	7	8	10	8	5	6	6	8	7	9	6	4	6	3	3	2	2	4	5	4	3	4	3	3

Updated to match(es) played on October 6, 2019. Source: Match reports
A = Away; H = Home; W = Win; D = Draw; L = Loss

===== Matches =====
Win Draw Loss

March 3, 2019 1	D.C. United	2–0	Atlanta United	Washington, D.C.
6:00 p.m. EST	Arriola 45+1'; Acosta 58'	Report	Ambrose (yellow card) 53'; Larentowicz (yellow card) 83'	Stadium: Audi Field; Attendance: 16,942; Referee: Jair Marrufo

March 10, 2019 2	Atlanta United	1–1	FC Cincinnati	Atlanta, Georgia
5:00 p.m. EDT	J. Martínez 5'; González Pírez (yellow card) 11'	Report	Lamah 86'	Stadium: Mercedes-Benz Stadium; Attendance: 70,382; Referee: Allen Chapman

March 17, 2019 3	Atlanta United	1–1	Philadelphia Union	Atlanta, Georgia
7:00 p.m. EDT	Barco 70'; González Pírez (yellow card) 90+3'	Report	Aaronson 47'; Medunjanin (yellow card) 53'; Burke (yellow card) 76'	Stadium: Mercedes-Benz Stadium; Attendance: 42,651; Referee: Robert Sibiga

March 30, 2019 4	Columbus Crew	2–0	Atlanta United	Columbus, Ohio
7:30 p.m. EDT	Santos 2'; Zardes 39'	Report	Nagbe (yellow card) 31'; Ambrose (yellow card) 64'	Stadium: Mapfre Stadium; Attendance: 10,973; Referee: Joseph Dickerson
Note: Delay due to severe weather at 31'

April 13, 2019 5	New England Revolution	0–2	Atlanta United	Foxborough, Massachusetts
7:30 p.m. EDT	Penilla (yellow card) 53'; Anibaba (yellow card) 53'; Caldwell (yellow card) 89'	Report	Barco 29', 49'; Larentowicz (yellow card) 71'; Robinson (yellow card) 83'	Stadium: Gillette Stadium; Attendance: 15,016; Referee: Alex Chilowicz

April 20, 2019 6	Atlanta United	1–2	FC Dallas	Atlanta, Georgia
4:00 p.m. EDT	González Pírez (yellow card) 40'; Larentowicz (yellow card) 61'; J. Martínez 90+7' (pen.)	Report	Ferreira 6'; Hedges (yellow card) 59'; Barrios (yellow card) 63'; González (yellow card) 74'; Acosta 84', (yellow card) 90+7'; Hayes (yellow card) 90+6'	Stadium: Mercedes-Benz Stadium; Attendance: 43,351; Referee: Armando Villarreal

April 27, 2019 7	Atlanta United	1–0	Colorado Rapids	Atlanta, Georgia
6:00 p.m. EDT	Gressel 74'	Report	Nicholson (yellow card) 35'; Wilson (yellow card) 45+1'; Acosta (yellow card) 90+6'	Stadium: Mercedes-Benz Stadium; Attendance: 43,005; Referee: Alan Kelly

May 5, 2019 8	Sporting Kansas City	0–3	Atlanta United	Kansas City, Kansas
9:00 p.m. EDT		Report	J. Martínez 39', 76'; Barco 47'; Remedi (yellow card) 66'	Stadium: Children's Mercy Park; Attendance: 18,518; Referee: Allen Chapman

May 8, 2019 9	Atlanta United	2–0	Toronto FC	Atlanta, Georgia
7:00 p.m. EDT	Villalba 17'; Escobar (yellow card) 56'; Gressel 67'	Report	Laryea (yellow card) 21'; Zavaleta (yellow card) 74'; Bradley (yellow card) 76'; Boyd (yellow card) 77'; Osorio (yellow card) 83'	Stadium: Mercedes-Benz Stadium; Attendance: 42,537; Referee: Chris Penso

May 12, 2019 10	Atlanta United	1–0	Orlando City SC	Atlanta, Georgia
2:30 p.m. EDT	G. Martínez 14'; Parkhurst (yellow card) 65'	Report	Jansson (yellow card) 90'	Stadium: Mercedes-Benz Stadium; Attendance: 68,152; Referee: Rubiel Vazquez

May 15, 2019 11	Vancouver Whitecaps FC	0–1	Atlanta United	Vancouver, British Columbia, Canada
10:00 p.m. EDT	Adnan (yellow card) 39'; Ardaiz (yellow card) 80'	Report	Escobar (yellow card) 13'; J. Martínez 29' (pen.); Remedi (yellow card) 86'	Stadium: BC Place; Attendance: 16,138; Referee: Baldomero Toledo

May 19, 2019 12	New York Red Bulls	1–0	Atlanta United	Harrison, New Jersey
5:00 p.m. EDT	Parker (red card) 35'; Barlow 65'	Report	Escobar (yellow card) 84'	Stadium: Red Bull Arena; Attendance: 18,495; Referee: Robert Sibiga

May 24, 2019 13	Real Salt Lake	2–1	Atlanta United	Sandy, Utah
9:00 p.m. EDT	Saucedo 36'; Herrera (yellow card) 66'; Savarino 90+4'	Report	Parkhurst (yellow card) 38'; J. Martínez 78'	Stadium: Rio Tinto Stadium; Attendance: 17,214; Referee: Jair Marrufo

May 29, 2019 14	Atlanta United	3–0	Minnesota United FC	Atlanta, Georgia
7:00 p.m. EDT	Escobar 23', (yellow card) 83'; Robinson (yellow card) 29'; J. Martínez 90+1', 90+4'	Report	Opara (yellow card) 32'; Danladi (yellow card) 49'	Stadium: Mercedes-Benz Stadium; Attendance: 42,703; Referee: Alex Chilowicz

June 1, 2019 15	Atlanta United	2–0	Chicago Fire	Atlanta, Georgia
6:00 p.m. EDT	J. Martínez 14', 43'; Escobar (yellow card) 33'	Report	Corrales (yellow card) 59'; Schweinsteiger (yellow card) 77'	Stadium: Mercedes-Benz Stadium; Attendance: 67,502; Referee: Nima Saghafi

June 26, 2019 16	Toronto FC	3–2	Atlanta United	Toronto, Ontario, Canada
8:00 p.m. EDT	Endoh 1'; Pozuelo 27', 90+4' (pen.); Ciman (yellow card) 69'	Report	González Pírez (yellow card) 11'; G. Martínez 17' (pen.), (penalty missed) 90+6'; Gressel 22'	Stadium: BMO Field; Attendance: 24,598; Referee: Alan Kelly

June 29, 2019 17	Atlanta United	2–1	Montreal Impact	Atlanta, Georgia
6:00 p.m. EDT	Meram 35', 83'; Vazquez (yellow card) 40'; Nagbe (yellow card) 57'; Escobar (yellow card) 67'	Report	Krolicki (yellow card) 41'; Diallo 50'; Raitala (yellow card) 90'	Stadium: Mercedes-Benz Stadium; Attendance: 44,627; Referee: Ramy Touchan

July 3, 2019 18	Chicago Fire	5–1	Atlanta United	Bridgeview, Illinois
8:00 p.m. EDT	Calvo 4'; Sapong 7', 37'; Gaitán 13' (pen.); Herbers 44'; Frankowski (yellow card) 55'; Gutjahr (yellow card) 87'; Nikolić (yellow card) 90+2'	Report	González Pírez (red card) 11'; Vazquez 58' (pen.); Robinson (yellow card) 69'	Stadium: SeatGeek Stadium; Attendance: 13,476; Referee: Silviu Petrescu

July 7, 2019 19	Atlanta United	3–3	New York Red Bulls	Atlanta, Georgia
2:00 p.m. EDT	Meram 10'; Escobar (yellow card) 45+3'; J. Martínez 79' (pen.), 90+1', (yellow card) 90+2'	Report	Royer 37'; Tarek (yellow card) 45+3'; Duncan (yellow card) 51'; White 60'; Wright-Phillips 90+3'	Stadium: Mercedes-Benz Stadium; Attendance: 68,077; Referee: Kevin Stott

July 14, 2019 20	Seattle Sounders FC	2–1	Atlanta United	Seattle, Washington
3:55 p.m. EDT	Ruidíaz 58'; Shipp 71'	Report	Robinson (yellow card) 22'; Parkhurst (yellow card) 41'; J. Martínez 65'; Escobar (yellow card) 82'	Stadium: CenturyLink Field; Attendance: 38,232; Referee: Robert Sibiga

July 17, 2019 21	Atlanta United	5–0	Houston Dynamo	Atlanta, Georgia
7:00 p.m. EDT	Nagbe 27'; Vazquez 29'; J. Martínez 60', 79'; Gressel 88'	Report	Elis (yellow card) 6' (red card) 6'; Vera (yellow card) 45+2'; Quioto (yellow card) 79'	Stadium: Mercedes-Benz Stadium; Attendance: 42,557; Referee: Chris Penso

July 21, 2019 22	Atlanta United	2–0	D.C. United	Atlanta, Georgia
4:00 p.m. EDT	González Pírez (yellow card) 81'; G. Martínez 89'; J. Martínez 90+2'	Report		Stadium: Mercedes-Benz Stadium; Attendance: 44,405; Referee: Allen Chapman

July 26, 2019 23	Los Angeles FC	4–3	Atlanta United	Los Angeles, California
10:00 p.m. EDT	Diomande 33'; Rossi 38'; Vela 42' (pen.); Atuesta 45'	Report	Adams 2'; Remedi (yellow card) 44'; J. Martínez 45+2'; Segura 51' (o.g.); González Pírez (yellow card) 56'; Meram (yellow card) 80'	Stadium: Banc of California Stadium; Attendance: 22,511; Referee: Ismail Elfath

August 3, 2019 24	Atlanta United	3–0	LA Galaxy	Atlanta, Georgia
5:00 p.m. EDT	Romney 23' (o.g.); González 43' (o.g.); J. Martínez 72' (pen.); G. Martínez (yellow card) 75'	Report	Feltscher (yellow card) 52'; González (yellow card) 71'; Araujo (yellow card) 89'	Stadium: Mercedes-Benz Stadium; Attendance: 72,548; Referee: Drew Fischer
Note: Broke MLS single-game regular season attendance record

August 11, 2019 25	Atlanta United	2–1	New York City FC	Atlanta, Georgia
4:00 p.m. EDT	González Pírez (yellow card) 20'; J. Martínez 42', 63' (pen.); G. Martínez (yellow card) 59'; Gressel (yellow card) 69'	Report	Sands (yellow card) 27'; Matarrita (yellow card) 37'; Chanot (yellow card) 74'; Héber 81'	Stadium: Mercedes-Benz Stadium; Attendance: 44,052; Referee: Jair Marrufo

August 18, 2019 26	Portland Timbers	0–2	Atlanta United	Portland, Oregon
10:00 p.m. EDT	Moreira (yellow card) 42'	Report	González Pírez 14'; Larentowicz (yellow card) 24'; Pogba (yellow card) 33'; Barco (yellow card) 45+1'; J. Martínez 46'	Stadium: Providence Park; Attendance: 25,218; Referee: Armando Villarreal

August 23, 2019 27	Orlando City SC	0–1	Atlanta United	Orlando, Florida
8:00 p.m. EDT		Report	González Pírez (yellow card) 36'; J. Martínez 60'; Gressel (yellow card) 90+3'	Stadium: Exploria Stadium; Attendance: 23,014; Referee: Nima Saghafi

August 31, 2019 28	Philadelphia Union	3–1	Atlanta United	Chester, Pennsylvania
7:30 p.m. EDT	Aaronson 61'; Fabián (yellow card) 78'; Przybyłko 86'; Santos 88', (yellow card) 89'	Report	Remedi (yellow card) 12'; J. Martínez 45+2'; González Pírez (yellow card) 90+3'	Stadium: Talen Energy Stadium; Attendance: 18,510; Referee: Robert Sibiga

September 14, 2019 29	Atlanta United	1–3	Columbus Crew	Atlanta, Georgia
7:00 p.m. EDT	J. Martínez 19'; Remedi (yellow card) 66'; Gressel (yellow card) 88'	Report	Artur (yellow card) 39'; Zardes 53'; L. Díaz 60'; Robinson 85' (o.g.); P. Santos (yellow card) 90'	Stadium: Mercedes-Benz Stadium; Attendance: 68,046; Referee: Alan Kelly

September 18, 2019 30	FC Cincinnati	0–2	Atlanta United	Cincinnati, Ohio
7:30 p.m. EDT	Stanko (yellow card) 90+4'	Report	Meram (yellow card) 14'; Escobar (yellow card) 49'; J. Martínez 59', 65'; González Pírez (yellow card) 66'	Stadium: Nippert Stadium; Attendance: 24,774; Referee: Marcos DeOliveira

September 21, 2019 31	Atlanta United	3–1	San Jose Earthquakes	Atlanta, Georgia
3:30 p.m. EDT	Meram 4', (yellow card) 24'; Hyndman (yellow card) 14', (goal) 90'; G. Martínez 90+2'	Report	Espinoza (yellow card) 16' (yellow-red card) 34'; Guzan 27' (o.g.); Vega (yellow card) 48'; Judson (yellow card) 62'; Wondolowski (red card) 90+1'	Stadium: Mercedes-Benz Stadium; Attendance: 43,451; Referee: Chris Penso

September 25, 2019 32	New York City FC	4–1	Atlanta United	New York, New York
7:00 p.m. EDT	Mitriță 14', 23', 34'; Ring (yellow card) 33'; Rocha (yellow card) 36'; Chanot (yellow card) 52'; Castellanos (yellow card) 71'; Héber 87'; Matarrita (yellow card) 90+3'	Report	Pogba (yellow card) 27'; González Pírez (yellow card) 45+2'; G. Martínez 53' (pen.); Remedi (yellow card) 56'; Adams (yellow card) 89'	Stadium: Yankee Stadium; Attendance: 24,290; Referee: Allen Chapman

September 29, 2019 33	Montreal Impact	1–1	Atlanta United	Montreal, Quebec, Canada
5:00 p.m. EDT	Bojan 81'	Report	Gressel 53'	Stadium: Saputo Stadium; Attendance: 15,557; Referee: Jair Marrufo

October 6, 2019 34	Atlanta United	3–1	New England Revolution	Atlanta, Georgia
4:00 p.m. EDT	Nagbe 3'; J. Martínez 49'; Gressel 57'	Report	Penilla 8'; Caicedo (yellow card) 14'; Zahibo (yellow card) 83'	Stadium: Mercedes-Benz Stadium; Attendance: 44,617; Referee: Ismail Elfath

==== MLS Cup Playoffs ====
October 19, 2019 First round	Atlanta United	1–0	New England Revolution	Atlanta, Georgia
1:00 PM EDT	J. Martínez (yellow card) 43'; González Pírez (yellow card) 53'; Larentowicz (yellow card) 58'; Escobar 70'	Report	Zahibo (yellow card) 42'; Delamea (yellow card) 76'	Stadium: Mercedes-Benz Stadium; Attendance: 66,114; Referee: Kevin Stott

October 24, 2019 Eastern Semifinals	Atlanta United	2–0	Philadelphia Union	Atlanta, Georgia
8:00 PM EDT	Gressel 10', (yellow card) 38'; J. Martínez 80'; Escobar (yellow card) 87'	Report	Bedoya (yellow card) 34'; Wagner (yellow card) 74'	Stadium: Mercedes-Benz Stadium; Attendance: 41,507; Referee: Ismail Elfath

October 30, 2019 Eastern Finals	Atlanta United	1–2	Toronto FC	Atlanta, Georgia
8:00 PM EDT	Gressel 4'	Report	Bradley (yellow card) 9'; Benezet 14'; Osorio (yellow card) 61'; DeLeon (yellow card) 70', (goal) 78'	Stadium: Mercedes-Benz Stadium; Attendance: 44,055; Referee: Alan Kelly

==== U.S. Open Cup ====
June 13, 2019 4th Round	Atlanta United (Georgia (U.S. state))	3–1 (a.e.t.)	(South Carolina) Charleston Battery	Kennesaw, Georgia
7:00 p.m. EDT	Larentowicz (yellow card) 17'; G. Martínez (yellow card) 73'; Williams 79', (yellow card) 98'; Vazquez 110', 120+1'	Report	Svantesson 20'; Bolt (yellow card) 90+4'; Higashi (yellow card) 116'	Stadium: Fifth Third Bank Stadium; Attendance: 0 Referee: Kevin Broadley
Note: Match was played behind closed doors. Venue was moved due to unplayable field conditions at MUSC Health Stadium on June 11 in Charleston.

June 18, 2019 Round of 16	Columbus Crew (Ohio)	2–3	(Georgia (U.S. state)) Atlanta United	Columbus, Ohio
7:00 p.m. EDT	Accam 40'; Mullins (yellow card) 42'; Crognale (yellow card) 51'; Afful (yellow card) 67'; Guzan 71' (o.g.); Guzmán (yellow card) 86'	Report	Vazquez 5', 65'; Robinson 14'; Meram (yellow card) 19'; González Pírez (yellow card) 52'; Barco (yellow card) 90+3'	Stadium: Mapfre Stadium; Attendance: 8,659; Referee: Guido Gonzalez

July 10, 2019 Quarter-finals	Atlanta United (Georgia (U.S. state))	2–0	(Missouri) Saint Louis FC	Kennesaw, Georgia
7:00 p.m. EDT	Meram (yellow card) 45'; G. Martínez 52'; Robinson (yellow card) 61'; J. Martínez 90+5' (pen.)	Report	Umar (yellow card) 59'; Reynolds (yellow card) 90+4'	Stadium: Fifth Third Bank Stadium; Attendance: 7,523; Referee: Rosendo Mendoza

August 6, 2019 Semi-finals	Orlando City SC (Florida)	0–2	(Georgia (U.S. state)) Atlanta United	Orlando, Florida
7:30 p.m. EDT	Akindele (yellow card) 68'	Report	Remedi 37'; González Pírez (yellow card) 59'; Hyndman 78'; Escobar (yellow card) 85'; Pogba (yellow card) 90'; Guzan (yellow card) 90+2'	Stadium: Exploria Stadium; Attendance: 18,461; Referee: Rubiel Vazquez

August 27, 2019 Final	Atlanta United (Georgia (U.S. state))	2–1	Minnesota United FC	Atlanta, Georgia
8:00 p.m. EDT	Gasper 10' (o.g.); G. Martínez 16'; González Pírez (yellow card) 71' (yellow-red card) 74'; Escobar (yellow card) 87'	Report	Dotson (yellow card) 29'; Alonso (yellow card) 44'; Lod 47'; Gasper (yellow card) 87'	Stadium: Mercedes-Benz Stadium; Attendance: 35,709; Referee: Allen Chapman

==== CONCACAF Champions League ====
February 21, 2019 Round of 16 Leg 1	Herediano (Costa Rica)	3–1	(United States) Atlanta United	Heredia, Costa Rica
10:00 p.m. EST	Ortiz 7'; Azofeifa 34', (yellow card) 47'; Granados 50'; Arellano (yellow card) 71'; Fuller (yellow card) 90+2'	Report	Gressel 41'; Bello (yellow card) 49'	Stadium: Estadio Eladio Rosabal Cordero; Attendance: 7,500; Referee: César Arturo Ramos

February 28, 2019 Round of 16 Leg 2	Atlanta United (United States)	4–0 (5–3 agg.)	(Costa Rica) Herediano	Kennesaw, United States
8:00 p.m. EST	J. Martínez 1', 63'; Gressel 9'; González Pírez (yellow card) 19', (goal) 84'; G. Martínez (yellow card) 37'	Report	Torres (yellow card) 74'	Stadium: Fifth Third Bank Stadium; Attendance: 8,589; Referee: Oshane Nation

March 6, 2019 Quarter-finals Leg 1	Monterrey (Mexico)	3–0	(United States) Atlanta United	Guadalupe, Mexico
10:00 p.m. EST	Sánchez 17' (pen.); Gallardo (yellow card) 28', (goal) 84'; Meza (yellow card) 60'; Pabón 80'	Report	Remedi (yellow card) 23'; Parkhurst (yellow card) 60'; González Pírez (yellow card) 76'	Stadium: Estadio BBVA Bancomer; Attendance: 50,000; Referee: Ismael Cornejo

March 13, 2019 Quarter-finals Leg 2	Atlanta United (United States)	1–0 (1–3 agg.)	(Mexico) Monterrey	Atlanta, United States
8:00 p.m. EDT	Parkhurst (yellow card) 60'; J. Martínez 77'	Report	Pizarro (yellow card) 84'	Stadium: Mercedes-Benz Stadium; Attendance: 40,048; Referee: Henry Bejarano

==== Campeones Cup ====
August 14, 2019 Final	Atlanta United (United States)	3–2	(Mexico) América	Atlanta, United States
8:00 p.m. EDT	Hyndman 5'; Larentowicz (yellow card) 28', (goal) 59'; J. Martínez 65' (pen.)	Report	Ibarra 13'; Valdez (yellow card) 41' (yellow-red card) 72'; R. Martínez 57'; Vargas (yellow card) 80'	Stadium: Mercedes-Benz Stadium; Attendance: 40,128; Referee: Joel Aguilar

== Statistics ==
=== Appearances and goals ===
As of October 31, 2019

No.	Pos	Nat	Player	Total		MLS		MLS Cup Playoffs		U.S. Open Cup		Champions League		Campeones Cup	
No.	Pos	Nat	Player	Apps	Goals	Apps	Goals	Apps	Goals	Apps	Goals	Apps	Goals	Apps	Goals
Goalkeepers
1	GK	(United States) USA	Brad Guzan	45	0	34	0	3	0	4	0	4	0	0	0
13	GK	(United States) USA	Brendan Moore	0	0	0	0	0	0	0	0	0	0	0	0
25	GK	(United States) USA	Alec Kann	2	0	0	0	0	0	1	0	0	0	1	0
Defenders
2	DF	(Argentina) ARG	Franco Escobar	34	2	22+3	1	3	1	4+1	0	0	0	1	0
3	DF	(United States) USA	Michael Parkhurst	28	0	15+5	0	2	0	1+1	0	4	0	0	0
4	DF	(Guinea) GUI	Florentin Pogba	22	0	8+5	0	2+1	0	2+2	0	0+1	0	1	0
5	DF	(Argentina) ARG	Leandro González Pírez	42	2	31	1	3	0	4	0	3	1	1	0
12	DF	(United States) USA	Miles Robinson	44	1	33+1	0	0	0	5	1	4	0	0+1	0
20	DF	(United States) USA	Brek Shea	24	0	10+9	0	0	0	2+1	0	2	0	0	0
21	DF	(United States) USA	George Bello	1	0	0	0	0	0	0	0	1	0	0	0
22	DF	(United States) USA	Mikey Ambrose	7	0	3+1	0	1	0	0	0	2	0	0	0
Midfielders
6	MF	(United States) USA	Darlington Nagbe	46	2	32+1	2	3	0	5	0	3+1	0	1	0
8	MF	(Argentina) ARG	Ezequiel Barco	26	4	11+4	4	3	0	3	0	4	0	0+1	0
10	MF	(Argentina) ARG	Pity Martínez	44	7	26+6	5	2	0	5	2	4	0	1	0
11	MF	(Argentina) ARG	Eric Remedi	38	1	25+3	0	0+1	0	4+1	1	4	0	0	0
14	MF	(Iraq) IRQ	Justin Meram	27	4	14+6	4	1	0	4+1	0	0	0	0+1	0
15	MF	(Paraguay) PAR	Héctor Villalba	27	1	10+10	1	0+2	0	0+1	0	0+4	0	0	0
16	MF	(United States) USA	Emerson Hyndman	21	3	10+5	1	1+1	0	2+1	1	0	0	1	1
18	MF	(United States) USA	Jeff Larentowicz	37	1	15+12	0	3	0	1+1	0	2+2	0	1	1
24	MF	(Germany) GER	Julian Gressel	42	10	30+2	6	3	2	2+1	0	3	2	1	0
27	MF	(United States) USA	Chris Goslin	0	0	0	0	0	0	0	0	0	0	0	0
28	MF	(England) ENG	Dion Pereira	21	0	7+11	0	0	0	1+1	0	0	0	1	0
29	MF	(England) ENG	Mo Adams	6	1	1+3	1	0+2	0	0	0	0	0	0	0
30	MF	(United States) USA	Andrew Carleton	6	0	0+3	0	0	0	1+2	0	0	0	0	0
31	MF	(Brazil) BRA	Luiz Fernando	0	0	0	0	0	0	0	0	0	0	0	0
32	MF	(Germany) GER	Kevin Kratz	2	0	0+1	0	0	0	0	0	0+1	0	0	0
Forwards
7	FW	(Venezuela) VEN	Josef Martínez	39	33	29	27	3	1	2	1	4	3	1	1
19	FW	(United States) USA	Brandon Vazquez	14	6	7+4	2	0	0	1+2	4	0	0	0	0
Players who have played for Atlanta United this season but have left the club:
9	FW	(Jamaica) JAM	Romario Williams	4	1	0+2	0	0	0	1	1	0+1	0	0	0

=== Top scorers ===
As of October 31, 2019

Place	Position	Name	MLS	Playoffs	U.S. Open Cup	Champions League	Campeones Cup	Total
1	FW	(Venezuela) Josef Martínez	27	1	1	3	1	33
2	MF	(Germany) Julian Gressel	6	2	0	2	0	10
3	MF	(Argentina) Pity Martínez	5	0	2	0	0	7
4	FW	(United States) Brandon Vazquez	2	0	4	0	0	6
5	MF	(Argentina) Ezequiel Barco	4	0	0	0	0	4
5	MF	(Iraq) Justin Meram	4	0	0	0	0	4
7	MF	(United States) Emerson Hyndman	1	0	1	0	1	3
8	DF	(Argentina) Franco Escobar	1	1	0	0	0	2
8	MF	(United States) Darlington Nagbe	2	0	0	0	0	2
8	DF	(Argentina) Leandro González Pírez	1	0	0	1	0	2
11	MF	(England) Mo Adams	1	0	0	0	0	1
11	MF	(United States) Jeff Larentowicz	0	0	0	0	1	1
11	MF	(Argentina) Eric Remedi	0	0	1	0	0	1
11	DF	(United States) Miles Robinson	0	0	1	0	0	1
11	MF	(Paraguay) Héctor Villalba	1	0	0	0	0	1
11	FW	(Jamaica) Romario Williams	0	0	1	0	0	1
Own Goals			3	0	1	0	0	3
Total			58	4	12	6	3	81

=== Disciplinary record ===
As of October 31, 2019

No.	Pos.	Name	MLS			MLS Cup Playoffs			U.S. Open Cup			Champions League			Campeones Cup			Total		
No.	Pos.	Name	Booked	(yellow card) (yellow-red card)	Sent off (straight red)	Booked	(yellow card) (yellow-red card)	Sent off (straight red)	Booked	(yellow card) (yellow-red card)	Sent off (straight red)	Booked	(yellow card) (yellow-red card)	Sent off (straight red)	Booked	(yellow card) (yellow-red card)	Sent off (straight red)	Booked	(yellow card) (yellow-red card)	Sent off (straight red)
1	GK	Brad Guzan							1									1		
2	DF	Franco Escobar	9			1			2									11		
3	DF	Michael Parkhurst	3									2						5		
4	DF	Florentin Pogba	2						1									3		
5	DF	Leandro González Pírez	11		1	1			2	1		2						15	1	1
6	MF	Darlington Nagbe	2															2		
7	FW	Josef Martínez	1			1												2		
8	MF	Ezequiel Barco	1						1									2		
9	FW	Romario Williams							1									1		
10	MF	Pity Martínez	2						1			1						4		
11	MF	Eric Remedi	6									1						7		
12	DF	Miles Robinson	4						1									5		
14	MF	Justin Meram	3						2									5		
16	MF	Emerson Hyndman	1															1		
18	MF	Jeff Larentowicz	4			1			1						1			7		
19	FW	Brandon Vazquez	1															1		
21	DF	George Bello										1						1		
22	DF	Mikey Ambrose	2															2		
24	MF	Julian Gressel	3			1												4		
29	MF	Mo Adams	1															1		
Total			56	0	1	5	0	0	12	0	0	7	0	0	1	0	0	82	1	1

== Player movement ==
=== In ===
No.	Pos.	Player	Transferred from	Type	US	Fee/notes	Date	Source
26	MF	(Republic of Ireland) Jon Gallagher	(United States) Atlanta United 2	Loan Return	Non-US (Note: Acquired a green card during the 2018 off-season, qualifying him as a domestic player starting in the 2019 season.)	Free	November 30, 2018	
29	MF	(England) Oliver Shannon	(United States) Atlanta United 2	Loan Return	Non-US	Free	November 30, 2018	
35	FW	(Nigeria) Patrick Okonkwo	(United States) Charleston Battery	Loan Return	US	Free	November 30, 2018	
33	FW	(Germany) Gordon Wild	(United States) Charleston Battery	Loan Return	Non-US (Note: Acquired a green card in May 2019, qualifying him as a domestic player.)	Free	November 30, 2018	
20	DF	(United States) Brek Shea	(Canada) Vancouver Whitecaps FC	Transfer	US	Free	December 30, 2018	
13	GK	(United States) Brendan Moore	(England) Rochdale	Transfer	US	Free	January 9, 2019	
28	MF	(England) Dion Pereira	(England) Watford	Transfer	Non-US	Free	January 15, 2019	
10	MF	(Argentina) Pity Martínez	(Argentina) River Plate	Transfer	Non-US	$17,000,000	January 24, 2019	
4	MF	(Guinea) Florentin Pogba	(Turkey) Gençlerbirliği	Transfer	Non-US	Free	February 5, 2019	
31	MF	(Ghana) Anderson Asiedu	(United States) UCLA	Draft	Non-US	Free	March 1, 2019	
14	MF	(Iraq) Justin Meram	(United States) Columbus Crew	Trade	US	$100K in GAM and a 2020 second round draft pick	May 8, 2019	
29	MF	(England) Mo Adams	(United States) Chicago Fire	Trade	US	$100K in GAM	July 17, 2019	
31	MF	(Brazil) Luiz Fernando	(United States) Atlanta United 2	Transfer	Non-US	Free	August 21, 2019	

==== SuperDraft picks ====
Draft picks are not automatically signed to the team roster. Only trades involving draft picks and executed after the start of 2019 MLS SuperDraft will be listed in the notes. Atlanta had three selections in the draft, but declined to use their fourth-round pick.

2019 Atlanta United SuperDraft Picks
Round	Selection	Player	Position	College	Status
1	24	(Ghana) Anderson Asiedu	MF	UCLA	Non-US
2	48	(United States) Amir Bashti	MF	Stanford	US

==== Loan in ====
No.	Pos.	Player	Loaned from	US	Start	End	Source
16	MF	(United States) Emerson Hyndman	(England) AFC Bournemouth	US	July 9, 2019	December 9, 2019	

=== Out ===
No.	Pos.	Player	Transferred to	Type	US	Fee/notes	Date	Source
14	DF	(United States) Sal Zizzo	(United States) San Diego Loyal (Note: Zizzo retired following the 2018 season, but later came out of retirement to sign for San Diego Loyal ahead of their first USL Championship season.)	Option Declined	US	Free	December 9, 2018	
27	GK	(United States) Mitch Hildebrandt	Retired	Option Declined	US	Free	December 9, 2018	
28	MF	(United States) Andrew Wheeler-Omiunu	(United States) FC Tucson	Option Declined	US	Free	December 9, 2018	
29	MF	(England) Oliver Shannon	Free agent	Option Declined	Non-US	Free	December 9, 2018	
4	DF	(United States) Greg Garza	(United States) FC Cincinnati	Trade	US	$200K GAM & $250K TAM	December 11, 2018	
10	MF	(Paraguay) Miguel Almirón	(England) Newcastle United	Transfer	Non-US	$27,000,000	January 31, 2019	
16	MF	(Republic of Ireland) Chris McCann	(United States) D.C. United	Waived	US	Free	February 9, 2019	
31	MF	(Ghana) Anderson Asiedu	(United States) Birmingham Legion	Waived	Non-US	Free	May 31, 2019	
9	FW	(Jamaica) Romario Williams	(United States) Columbus Crew	Trade	US	$100K GAM	July 9, 2019	
33	FW	(Germany) Gordon Wild	(United States) D.C. United	Waived	US	Free	July 17, 2019	

==== Loan out ====
No.	Pos.	Player	Loaned to	Start	End	Source
—	FW	(Nigeria) Patrick Okonkwo	(United States) Atlanta United 2	March 1, 2019	End of season	
—	DF	(Venezuela) José Hernández	(United States) Atlanta United 2	March 1, 2019	End of season	
31	MF	(Ghana) Anderson Asiedu	(United States) Atlanta United 2	March 1, 2019	May 31, 2019	
23	FW	(United States) Lagos Kunga	(United States) Memphis 901 FC	May 13, 2019	End of season	
26	MF	(Republic of Ireland) Jon Gallagher	(Scotland) Aberdeen	June 21, 2019	May 14, 2020 (Note: Gallagher's loan was originally until the end of the 2019 U.S. season, but was later extended until the end of the 2019-2020 Scottish season.)	

=== Non-player transfers ===
Acquired	From	For	Source
$50K in GAM	(United States) D.C. United	Discovery rights for Lucas Rodríguez	
Discovery rights for Emerson Hyndman	(United States) FC Dallas	$200K in GAM, international roster slot for 2019 & 2020 season	

== Honors ==
=== Weekly / monthly ===
==== MLS player of the month ====
Month	Player	Stats	Ref
July	(Venezuela) Josef Martínez	5 GP, 7 G	
August	(Venezuela) Josef Martínez (2)	5 GP, 6 G	

==== MLS team / player / coach of the week ====
Week	Team of the week		Player of the week	Coach of the week	Ref
Week	Starting XI	Bench	Player of the week	Coach of the week	Ref
3	(United States) Miles Robinson				
7	(Argentina) Ezequiel Barco		(Argentina) Ezequiel Barco		
9	(United States) Darlington Nagbe				
10	(Argentina) Ezequiel Barco (2) (Venezuela) Josef Martínez		(Argentina) Ezequiel Barco (2)		
11	(United States) Brad Guzan (Paraguay) Héctor Villalba			Frank de Boer	
14	(Venezuela) Josef Martínez (2) (United States) Miles Robinson (2)	(United States) Brad Guzan (2)	(Venezuela) Josef Martínez	Frank de Boer (2)	
17	(Iraq) Justin Meram				
20	(Germany) Julian Gressel (Venezuela) Josef Martínez (3)	(United States) Brad Guzan (3)		Frank de Boer (3)	
22	(United States) Miles Robinson (3)				
23	(Venezuela) Josef Martínez (4)	(Germany) Julian Gressel (2)	(Venezuela) Josef Martínez (2)		
24	(United States) Darlington Nagbe (2) (United States) Miles Robinson (4)	(Argentina) Pity Martínez		Frank de Boer (4)	
25	(Argentina) Ezequiel Barco (3) (United States) Miles Robinson (5)				
29	(United States) Emerson Hyndman (Venezuela) Josef Martínez (5)		(Venezuela) Josef Martínez (3)		
31	(Germany) Julian Gressel (3)				

==== MLS goal of the week ====
Week	Player	Ref
7	(Argentina) Ezequiel Barco	
10	(Argentina) Ezequiel Barco (2)	
11	(Argentina) Pity Martínez	
24	(Venezuela) Josef Martínez	
26	(Venezuela) Josef Martínez (2)	
29	(Venezuela) Josef Martínez (3)	
30	(Germany) Julian Gressel	
31	(Germany) Julian Gressel (2)	

=== Annual ===
Honor	Player	Ref
MLS Best XI	(Venezuela) Josef Martínez (United States) Miles Robinson	
MLS Goal of the Year	(Venezuela) Josef Martínez	
MLS All-Star Game	(Argentina) Ezequiel Barco (Argentina) Leandro González Pírez (United States) Brad Guzan (Venezuela) Josef Martínez (Argentina) Pity Martínez	
