= Miles Robinson (soccer) =

American soccer player (born 1997)

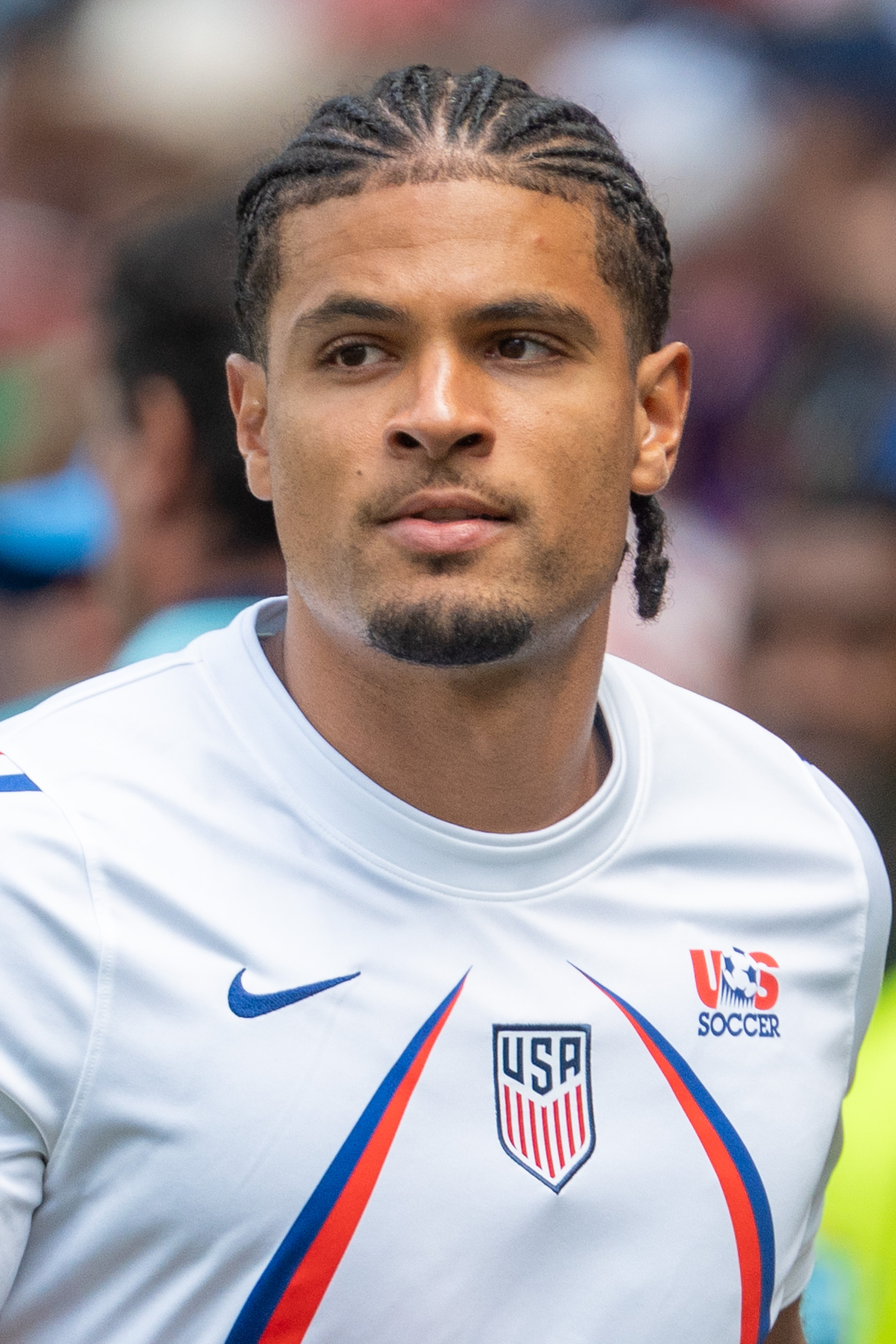
- Robinson with the United States in 2026

Personal information
- Full name: Miles Gordon Robinson
- Date of birth: March 14, 1997 (age 29)
- Place of birth: Arlington, Massachusetts, United States
- Height: 6 ft 2 in (1.87 m)
- Position: Center-back

Team information
- Current team: FC Cincinnati
- Number: 12

Youth career
- 2010–2014: FC Boston Bolts

College career
| Years | Team | Apps | (Gls) |
| 2015–2016 | Syracuse Orange | 42 | (8) |

Senior career*
| Years | Team | Apps | (Gls) |
| 2016 | FC Boston | 6 | (0) |
| 2017–2023 | Atlanta United | 123 | (3) |
| 2017 | → Charleston Battery (loan) | 6 | (1) |
| 2018 | → Atlanta United 2 (loan) | 14 | (1) |
| 2024– | FC Cincinnati | 72 | (2) |

International career^{‡}
| 2016 | United States U20 | 8 | (0) |
| 2019–2024 | United States U23 (O.P.) | 7 | (1) |
| 2019– | United States | 42 | (3) |
Medal record
Representing United States
CONCACAF Gold Cup
| Winner | 2021 United States |
| Runner-up | 2025 Canada–United States |
CONCACAF Nations League
| Winner | 2023 United States |
| Winner | 2024 United States |
- * Club domestic league appearances and goals as of 03:07, November 8, 2026 (UTC) ‡ National team caps and goals as of September 29, 2026

Miles Gordon Robinson (born March 14, 1997) is an American professional soccer player who plays as a center-back for Major League Soccer club FC Cincinnati and the United States national team.

Born in Arlington, Massachusetts, Robinson began his career with FC Boston Bolts before playing college soccer with the Syracuse Orange. After two seasons with Syracuse, Robinson was drafted with the second overall pick in the 2017 MLS SuperDraft by expansion club Atlanta United. He initially did not feature for the side, and was loaned out to the Charleston Battery in 2017, followed by reserve affiliate Atlanta United 2 in 2018. From the 2019 season, Robinson began appearing as a regular starter for the club following the arrival of Frank de Boer as head coach.

Robinson made his senior debut for the United States in September 2019. In July 2021, he was selected as part of the 23-man squad for the CONCACAF Gold Cup; in the final against Mexico, Robinson scored the winner in extra time to win the United States the title.

== Early life ==
Robinson was raised in Arlington, Massachusetts, a suburb of Boston. His interest in soccer began when watching his older sister, Rebecca, play in local matches and he began playing organized soccer when he was four years old. He attended Arlington High School, where he played for the school's basketball team. During his junior season, Robinson was the Middlesex League co-MVP and lead his team in scoring, assists, rebounds, and steals. John Bowler, his basketball coach at Arlington, praised Robinson's abilities on the court: "His IQ, where he is supposed to be and changing speeds, is just unbelievable. Even though you know he's quick, he'll lull you to sleep. If you relax for a second, with one step, he's right by you."

In soccer, Robinson was part of the youth team at FC Boston Bolts, meaning he couldn't participate with the soccer team at Arlington High School. Brian Ainscough, the chief executive officer for the Bolts, singled out Robinson's build and potential at a young age: "He was this kid that was 5-foot-9, with a size-13 shoe, looking like Bambi... We're lucky we have him as a soccer player, so be happy with that."

== College ==
In 2015, Robinson committed to playing college soccer at Syracuse University, joining Ian McIntyre's Orange. He made his debut for the side on August 28, 2015, starting in a 2–1 opening day defeat against the Hofstra Pride. On September 19, Robinson scored his first goal for Syracuse in a 3–1 away defeat against the Wake Forest Demon Deacons. As a freshman, Robinson started all 25 matches for Syracuse, scoring four goals. In November 2015, following a victory over Notre Dame, Syracuse qualified for the NCAA Tournament with a record best for the program sixth seed. Robinson started for Syracuse in their first three matches of the tournament, leading the Orange to the College Cup in Kansas City. On December 11, Robinson started in Syracuse's opening College Cup match against the Clemson Tigers. He helped the Orange keep a clean sheet through extra time, however the side would be knocked out 4–1 in the penalty shootout.

Prior to the NCAA Tournament, Robinson earned a spot in the Atlantic Coast Conference (ACC) All-Tournament Team.

During his sophomore season, Robinson earned the ACC Defensive Player of the Year award, starting all 17 matches for Syracuse, scoring another four goals. He once again helped Syracuse qualify for the 2016 NCAA Tournament but couldn't prevent the side from falling 1–0 against the North Carolina Tar Heels in the third round. On December 10, 2016, Robinson was named into the National Soccer Coaches Association NCAA Division I Men's All-America First Team, being joined by future Atlanta United teammates Gordon Wild and Julian Gressel.

== Club career ==
=== FC Boston ===
Following the 2015 college season, Robinson joined FC Boston, the semi-professional outfit of his youth club FC Boston Bolts, in the Premier Development League. He made his debut on May 21, 2016, against F.A. Euro, starting in the 3–1 away victory. Robinson played six matches during his time with FC Boston and following the season, was named as the top defender among college prospects by the United Soccer League.

=== Atlanta United ===
On January 4, 2017, Robinson elected to leave Syracuse early and signed a Generation Adidas contract with Major League Soccer, allowing him to be selected in the 2017 MLS SuperDraft. Robinson was selected as the second overall pick in the draft on January 13 by expansion side Atlanta United

==== Loan to Charleston Battery ====
On May 23, 2017, after only appearing on the bench for Atlanta United, Robinson joined United Soccer League club Charleston Battery on a short-term loan. He made his professional debut for Charleston two days later in their 1–0 away victory over Bethlehem Steel, partnering with Taylor Mueller. On July 26, Robinson scored his first goal for the Battery, an 11th-minute opener in a 2–2 draw against the Pittsburgh Riverhounds.

==== Return to Atlanta United ====
On June 14, 2017, Robinson returned from his loan with Charleston Battery temporarily to make his debut for Atlanta United in their U.S. Open Cup match against the Battery themselves. He started next to Anton Walkes as Atlanta United won 3–2. This would be Robinson's only appearance for Atlanta United in his debut professional season.

Robinson began the next season on the bench for Atlanta United against the Vancouver Whitecaps FC on March 17, 2018. On March 24, Robinson appeared for Atlanta United 2, the club's reserve affiliate in the United Soccer League, against New York Red Bulls II, starting in the 3–1 victory. On April 7, Robinson made his first league appearance after Leandro González Pírez was suspended. Starting for head coach Tata Martino in a back three against Los Angeles FC, Atlanta won 5–0 at home. He made only 14 appearances for Atlanta United in 2018, two of which came in the 2018 MLS playoffs. On November 11, due to an injury to starter Jeff Larentowicz, Robinson was included in the starting line-up for Atlanta United against New York City FC in the Eastern Conference semifinals second-leg. He held his own in the back three as Atlanta United won 3–1 and advanced on aggregate. Robinson was then selected to the bench for Atlanta United in MLS Cup 2018 against the Portland Timbers, but he did not come off the bench as his side won 2–0, winning the championship.

Following the 2018 season, Robinson had a breakthrough season in 2019 under new head coach Frank de Boer. He made his North American debut on February 21 against Herediano in the CONCACAF Champions League. He started alongside González Pírez and Michael Parkhurst as Atlanta United were defeated 3–1 away. He started the second leg matchup as well which saw Atlanta United win 4–0, advancing 5–3 on aggregate. Under de Boer, Robinson became a solid starter for Atlanta United's defense, as he started in 33 out of 34 matches during the regular season. On June 18, Robinson scored his first competitive goal for Atlanta United in their 3–2 victory over the Columbus Crew in the U.S. Open Cup.

On August 14, 2019, Robinson came on as a substitute in Atlanta United's 3–2 victory over Mexican side América in the Campeones Cup. He was then selected to start in the U.S. Open Cup Final on August 27 against Minnesota United, as Atlanta United won 2–1. This was Robinson's second major trophy. Following the end of the regular season, Robinson finished third in the voting for MLS Defender of the Year, finishing behind Ike Opara and Walker Zimmerman. He was then selected into the MLS Best XI for the 2019 season. On October 8, 2019, Robinson signed a new contract with Atlanta United, keeping him with the club until 2023.

In October 2019, while away with the United States national team, Robinson suffered a hamstring injury which would rule him out of the MLS Cup Playoffs, ending his season.

The next season, following his recovery, Robinson suffered a quad strain during the club's pre-season match against Leones Negros. The injury meant that Robinson would miss Atlanta United's opening round matches against Motagua in the Champions League and their first two league matches against Nashville SC and FC Cincinnati. Due to the COVID-19 pandemic, play was temporarily suspended until July, when Atlanta United entered the MLS is Back Tournament. Robinson was listed in the squad as healthy. He made his first competitive appearance of the season on July 11 in their opener against the New York Red Bulls, starting as Atlanta were defeated 1–0. He made 18 appearances during the 2020 season, but couldn't help the club avoid missing the playoffs for the first time in club history.

On August 4, 2021, Robinson was selected to represent Major League Soccer in the MLS All-Star Game against the Liga MX All-Stars. He came on as a substitute during the match on August 25 at Banc of California Stadium in Los Angeles as the MLS All-Stars won 3–2 in the penalty shootout.

On May 7, 2022, Robinson tore his left Achilles tendon during an MLS match against the Chicago Fire. He underwent surgery on May 9, 2022, with the recovery expected to prevent him from playing in the upcoming 2022 World Cup.

=== FC Cincinnati ===
On January 3, 2024, Robinson signed as a free agent with FC Cincinnati on a one-year deal, with Cincinnati having the option to extend the deal for another year.

== International career ==
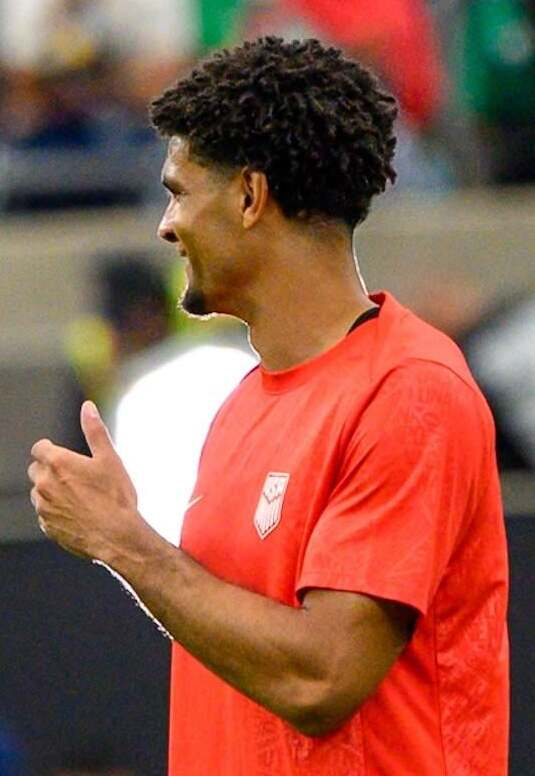
Robinson with the United States in 2025.

Robinson has represented the United States at the under-20 and under-23 levels. In 2013, he was invited to train with the under-18 side. Following his freshman season at Syracuse, Robinson was called into the under-20 side by Tab Ramos. In July 2016, Robinson started in every match for the under-20's during the 2016 NTC Invitational.

On March 19, 2019, Robinson was named by Jason Kreis into the under-23 side which would play three friendlies that month in preparation for 2020 Olympic qualification. He made his debut for the team on March 22 against Egypt, coming on as a halftime substitute in the 2–0 defeat. In February 2021, Robinson was selected again by Kreis into the preliminary roster prior for qualification but was not released by Atlanta United as they were preparing for the upcoming 2021 season.

On August 28, 2019, Robinson was called into the senior national team by Gregg Berhalter for two September friendlies against Mexico and Uruguay. He proceeded to make his international debut on September 6 against Mexico at MetLife Stadium, coming on as a 58th-minute substitute in a 3–0 defeat. In December 2019, after returning to Atlanta United injured, thus missing the MLS playoffs, his club declined to release Robinson for the January 2020 friendlies. He would return to the national team setup in January 2021, being called into camp that month. On January 31, Robinson scored his first international goal against Trinidad and Tobago, the fifth in a 7–0 victory in Orlando.

In July 2021, Robinson was named into the 23-man United States squad for the 2021 CONCACAF Gold Cup. Going into the tournament, Robinson was expected to be the starting center-back. He would go on to start in all six matches for the United States, playing every minute of the competition. In the United States' second group stage match against Martinique, Robinson scored the third goal in a 6–1 victory. On August 1, Robinson started for the United States in the Gold Cup final against Mexico. After the match went into extra-time tied 0–0, Robinson scored the winning goal in the 117th minute, a header that came off a free kick from Kellyn Acosta, giving the United States a 1–0 victory and their first final victory against Mexico since 2007.

On May 26, 2026, Robinson was selected in the 26-man squad for the 2026 FIFA World Cup. He made his first appearance on June 25 in a 2-3 loss against Türkiye.

== Career statistics ==
=== Club ===
As of match played November 19, 2026

Appearances and goals by club, season and competition
| Club | Season | League | | | Playoffs (Note: Includes MLS Cup playoffs) | | National cup (Note: Includes U.S. Open Cup) | | Continental | | Other | | Total | |
| Club | Season | Division | Apps | Goals | Apps | Goals | Apps | Goals | Apps | Goals | Apps | Goals | Apps | Goals |
|---|---|---|---|---|---|---|---|---|---|---|---|---|---|---|
| FC Boston | 2016 | PDL | 6 | 0 | — | | — | | — | | — | | 6 | 0 |
| Atlanta United | 2017 | MLS | — | | — | | 1 | 0 | — | | — | | 1 | 0 |
| Atlanta United | 2018 | MLS | 10 | 0 | 2 | 0 | 2 | 0 | — | | — | | 14 | 0 |
| Atlanta United | 2019 | MLS | 34 | 0 | — | | 5 | 1 | 4 (Note: Appearance(s) in CONCACAF Champions League/Cup) | 0 | 1 (Note: Appearance in Campeones Cup) | 0 | 44 | 1 |
| Atlanta United | 2020 | MLS | 17 | 0 | — | | — | | 1 | 0 | — | | 18 | 0 |
| Atlanta United | 2021 | MLS | 26 | 1 | 1 | 0 | — | | 4 | 0 | — | | 31 | 1 |
| Atlanta United | 2022 | MLS | 9 | 0 | — | | 1 | 0 | — | | — | | 10 | 0 |
| Atlanta United | 2023 | MLS | 27 | 2 | 3 | 0 | — | | — | | 2 (Note: Appearances in Leagues Cup) | 0 | 32 | 2 |
| Atlanta United | Total | | 123 | 3 | 6 | 0 | 9 | 1 | 9 | 0 | 3 | 0 | 150 | 4 |
| Charleston Battery (loan) | 2017 | USL | 6 | 1 | — | | — | | — | | — | | 6 | 1 |
| Atlanta United 2 (loan) | 2018 | USL | 14 | 1 | — | | — | | — | | — | | 14 | 1 |
| FC Cincinnati | 2024 | MLS | 25 | 1 | 3 | 0 | — | | 3 | 0 | 2 | 0 | 33 | 1 |
| FC Cincinnati | 2025 | MLS | 26 | 1 | 4 | 0 | — | | 4 | 0 | 2 | 0 | 36 | 1 |
| FC Cincinnati | 2026 | MLS | 21 | 0 | 1 | 0 | — | | 3 | 0 | 3 | 0 | 28 | 0 |
| FC Cincinnati | Total | | 72 | 2 | 8 | 0 | — | | 10 | 0 | 7 | 0 | 97 | 2 |
| Career total | | | 221 | 7 | 14 | 0 | 9 | 1 | 19 | 0 | 10 | 0 | 273 | 8 |

=== International ===
As of match played September 29, 2026

Appearances and goals by national team and year
| National team | Year | Apps | Goals |
|---|---|---|---|
| United States | 2019 | 2 | 0 |
| United States | 2020 | 0 | 0 |
| United States | 2021 | 13 | 3 |
| United States | 2022 | 5 | 0 |
| United States | 2023 | 7 | 0 |
| United States | 2024 | 3 | 0 |
| United States | 2025 | 9 | 0 |
| United States | 2026 | 3 | 0 |
| Total | | 42 | 3 |

As of match played September 29, 2026. United States score listed first, score column indicates score after each Robinson goal.

List of international goals scored by Miles Robinson
| No. | Date | Venue | Cap | Opponent | Score | Result | Competition | Ref. |
|---|---|---|---|---|---|---|---|---|
| 1 | January 31, 2021 | Exploria Stadium, Orlando, United States | 3 | Trinidad and Tobago | 5–0 | 7–0 | Friendly | |
| 2 | July 15, 2021 | Children's Mercy Park, Kansas City, United States | 5 | Martinique | 3–0 | 6–1 | 2021 CONCACAF Gold Cup | |
| 3 | August 1, 2021 | Allegiant Stadium, Paradise, United States | 9 | Mexico | 1–0 | 1–0 | 2021 CONCACAF Gold Cup final | |

== Honors ==
Atlanta United

- MLS Cup: 2018
- U.S. Open Cup: 2019
- Campeones Cup: 2019

United States

- CONCACAF Gold Cup: 2021
- CONCACAF Nations League: 2022–23, 2023–24

Individual

- ACC Defender of the Year: 2016
- MLS Best XI: 2019, 2021
- CONCACAF Gold Cup Best XI: 2021
- MLS All-Star: 2021, 2025
