= 2019 Major League Soccer season =

24th season of Major League Soccer

Major League Soccer
- Season: 2019
- Dates: March 2 – October 6 (regular season); October 19 – November 10 (playoffs)
- Teams: 24
- MLS Cup: Seattle Sounders FC (2nd title)
- Supporters' Shield: Los Angeles FC (1st shield)
- Champions League (United States): Atlanta United FC; Los Angeles FC; New York City FC; Seattle Sounders FC
- Champions League (Canada): Montreal Impact
- Leagues Cup (canceled): D.C. United; LA Galaxy; Minnesota United FC; New York Red Bulls; Philadelphia Union; Portland Timbers; Real Salt Lake; Toronto FC
- Matches: 408
- Goals: 1,241 (3.04 per match)
- Top goalscorer: Carlos Vela (34 goals)
- Best goalkeeper: Brad Guzan; Bill Hamid (14 shutouts each)
- Biggest home win: 6 goals: SKC 7–1 MTL (March 30); MIN 7–1 CIN (June 29); DAL 6–0 SKC (October 6)
- Biggest away win: 5 goals: SJ 0–5 LAFC (March 30)
- Highest scoring: 9 goals: COL 6–3 MTL (August 3); LA 7–2 SKC (September 15)
- Longest winning run: 6 games: Seattle Sounders FC (September 29 – November 10)
- Longest unbeaten run: 13 games: Toronto FC (August 10 – November 10)
- Longest winless run: 11 games: Colorado Rapids (March 2 – May 19)
- Longest losing run: 8 games: Colorado Rapids (March 23 – May 19)
- Highest attendance: 72,548; ATL 3–0 LA (August 3)
- Lowest attendance: 6,074; CHI 5–0 NE (May 8)
- Total attendance: 8,676,109
- Average attendance: 21,265

The 2019 Major League Soccer season was the 24th season of Major League Soccer. The regular season began on March 2, 2019 and ended on October 6. The MLS Cup playoffs began on October 19 and concluded with MLS Cup 2019 on November 10, under a new format that included 14 teams and consisted only of single-match rounds.

FC Cincinnati joined the league as an expansion franchise, bringing the total number of clubs to 24. Minnesota United FC opened their first soccer-specific stadium, Allianz Field, on April 13.

Atlanta United FC were the defending MLS Cup champions, while New York Red Bulls were the defending Supporters' Shield winners.

Los Angeles FC won their first Supporters' Shield with an MLS single-season record 72 points, while Seattle Sounders FC won their second MLS Cup title.

== Teams ==
=== Stadiums and locations ===
Western Conference
Team	Stadium	Capacity (Maximum)
Colorado Rapids	Dick's Sporting Goods Park	18,061
FC Dallas	Toyota Stadium	20,500
Houston Dynamo	BBVA Stadium	22,039
LA Galaxy	Dignity Health Sports Park	27,000
Los Angeles FC	Banc of California Stadium	22,000
Minnesota United FC	Allianz Field	19,400
Portland Timbers	Providence Park	25,218
Real Salt Lake	Rio Tinto Stadium	20,213
San Jose Earthquakes	Avaya Stadium	18,000
Seattle Sounders FC	CenturyLink Field	39,419 (68,740)
Sporting Kansas City	Children's Mercy Park	18,467
Vancouver Whitecaps FC	BC Place	22,120 (54,500)

Eastern Conference
Team	Stadium	Capacity
Atlanta United FC	Mercedes-Benz Stadium	42,500 (71,000)
Chicago Fire	SeatGeek Stadium	20,000
FC Cincinnati	Nippert Stadium	32,250 (40,000)
Columbus Crew SC	Mapfre Stadium	19,968
D.C. United	Audi Field	20,000
Montreal Impact	Saputo Stadium	20,801
New England Revolution	Gillette Stadium	20,000 (65,878)
New York City FC	Yankee Stadium	28,743 (47,309)
New York Red Bulls	Red Bull Arena	25,000
Orlando City SC	Exploria Stadium	25,500
Philadelphia Union	Talen Energy Stadium	18,500
Toronto FC	BMO Field	30,000 (36,000)

Locations of teams for the 2019 Major League Soccer season
Western Conference Eastern Conference

1. Non-soccer specific stadium and artificially reduced capacity.

The Portland Timbers announced in late 2018 that, due to expansion construction at Providence Park, they would play the first 12 games of the 2019 season on the road. The construction, which added about 4000 seats (bringing the total capacity to just over 25,000), also included a completely remodeled east side of the stadium, an updated concourse and concession stands on the west side of the stadium, a new scoreboard, ribbon boards and video board, and new turf. The stadium was expected to be ready to host MLS games in May or June 2019. The first home game for Portland in their renovated stadium was held on June 1, 2019, against Los Angeles FC.

Two stadiums were renamed during the season. First, on June 4, Exploria Resorts acquired the naming rights to Orlando City Stadium, which was accordingly renamed Exploria Stadium. Then, on June 13, the U.S. arm of the Spanish multinational bank BBVA announced a rebranding of the U.S. operations from "BBVA Compass" to "BBVA". As part of the rebranding, BBVA Compass Stadium became simply BBVA Stadium.

=== Personnel and sponsorship ===
Note: All teams use Adidas as kit manufacturer.

Team	Head coach	Captain	Shirt sponsor
Atlanta United FC	(Netherlands) Frank de Boer	(United States) Michael Parkhurst	American Family Insurance
Chicago Fire	(Serbia) Veljko Paunović	(United States) Dax McCarty	Motorola
FC Cincinnati	(Netherlands) Ron Jans (Note: Jans was named head coach on August 4, replacing interim head coach Yoann Damet, who took over after FC Cincinnati relieved Alan Koch of his duties on May 7.)	(Costa Rica) Kendall Waston	Mercy Health
Colorado Rapids	(United States) Robin Fraser (Note: Fraser was named head coach on August 25, replacing interim head coach Conor Casey, who took over after the Rapids relieved Anthony Hudson of his duties as head coach on May 1.)	(United States) Tim Howard	Transamerica
Columbus Crew SC	(United States) Caleb Porter	(United States) Wil Trapp	Acura
D.C. United	(United States) Ben Olsen	(England) Wayne Rooney	Leidos
FC Dallas	(United States) Luchi Gonzalez	(Switzerland) Reto Ziegler	AdvoCare
Houston Dynamo	(United States) Davy Arnaud (Note: Arnaud was named interim head coach on August 13 following the Dynamo's announcement that the club had relieved Wílmer Cabrera of his duties as head coach.)	(United States) DaMarcus Beasley	MD Anderson (Note: Practice jersey sponsor is Phillips 66's 76 brand.)
LA Galaxy	(Argentina) Guillermo Barros Schelotto	(Sweden) Zlatan Ibrahimović	Herbalife
Los Angeles FC	(United States) Bob Bradley	(Mexico) Carlos Vela	YouTube TV
Minnesota United FC	(England) Adrian Heath	(Cuba) Osvaldo Alonso	Target
Montreal Impact	(Colombia) Wílmer Cabrera (Note: Cabrera was named head coach on August 21 following the Impact's announcement that the club had relieved Rémi Garde of his duties as head coach.)	(Argentina) Ignacio Piatti	Bank of Montreal
New England Revolution	(United States) Bruce Arena (Note: Arena was named head coach on May 14, replacing interim head coach Mike Lapper, who took over after the Revolution relieved Brad Friedel of his duties on May 9.)	(Spain) Carles Gil	UnitedHealthcare
New York City FC	(Spain) Domènec Torrent	(Finland) Alexander Ring	Etihad Airways (Note: Practice jersey sponsor is NewYork-Presbyterian.)
New York Red Bulls	(United States) Chris Armas	(United States) Luis Robles	Red Bull
Orlando City SC	(Republic of Ireland) James O'Connor	(Portugal) Nani	Orlando Health
Philadelphia Union	(United States) Jim Curtin	(United States) Alejandro Bedoya	Bimbo Bakeries USA
Portland Timbers	(Venezuela) Giovanni Savarese	(Argentina) Diego Valeri	Alaska Airlines (Note: Practice jersey sponsor is Dutch Bros. Coffee.)
Real Salt Lake	(United States) Freddy Juarez (Note: Juarez was named interim head coach on August 11, after the announcement that RSL would relieve Mike Petke of his duties as head coach.)	(United States) Kyle Beckerman	LifeVantage
San Jose Earthquakes	(Argentina) Matías Almeyda	(United States) Chris Wondolowski	—
Seattle Sounders FC	(United States) Brian Schmetzer	(Uruguay) Nicolás Lodeiro	Zulily (Note: Practice jersey sponsor is CHI Franciscan.)
Sporting Kansas City	(United States) Peter Vermes	(United States) Matt Besler	Ivy Funds
Toronto FC	(United States) Greg Vanney	(United States) Michael Bradley	Bank of Montreal
Vancouver Whitecaps FC	(Canada) Marc Dos Santos	(Spain) Jon Erice	Bell Canada

=== Coaching changes ===
Team	Outgoing coach	Manner of departure	Date of vacancy	Position in table	Incoming coach	Date of appointment
Vancouver Whitecaps FC	(England) Craig Dalrymple	End of interim period	November 7, 2018	Pre-season	(Canada) Marc Dos Santos	November 7, 2018
FC Dallas	(Colombia) Óscar Pareja	Resigned	November 16, 2018	Pre-season	(United States) Luchi Gonzalez	December 16, 2018
Columbus Crew SC	(United States) Gregg Berhalter	Signed by United States	November 29, 2018	Pre-season	(United States) Caleb Porter	January 4, 2019
Atlanta United FC	(Argentina) Tata Martino	End of contract	December 18, 2018	Pre-season	(Netherlands) Frank de Boer	December 23, 2018
LA Galaxy	(United States) Dominic Kinnear	End of interim period	January 2, 2019	Pre-season	(Argentina) Guillermo Barros Schelotto	January 2, 2019
Colorado Rapids	(England) Anthony Hudson	Fired	May 1, 2019	12th in West, 24th overall	(United States) Conor Casey	May 1, 2019
FC Cincinnati	(South Africa) Alan Koch	Fired	May 7, 2019	11th in East, 22nd overall	(France) Yoann Damet	May 7, 2019
New England Revolution	(United States) Brad Friedel	Fired	May 9, 2019	12th in East, 23rd overall	(United States) Mike Lapper	May 9, 2019
New England Revolution	(United States) Mike Lapper	End of interim period	May 14, 2019	12th in East, 21st overall	(United States) Bruce Arena	May 14, 2019
FC Cincinnati	(France) Yoann Damet	End of interim period	August 4, 2019	12th in East, 24th overall	(Netherlands) Ron Jans	August 4, 2019
Real Salt Lake	(United States) Mike Petke	Fired	August 10, 2019	6th in West, 10th overall	(United States) Freddy Juarez	August 11, 2019
Houston Dynamo	(Colombia) Wílmer Cabrera	Fired	August 13, 2019	9th in West, 17th overall	(United States) Davy Arnaud	August 13, 2019
Montreal Impact	(France) Rémi Garde	Fired	August 21, 2019	7th in East, 15th overall	(Colombia) Wílmer Cabrera	August 21, 2019
Colorado Rapids	(United States) Conor Casey	End of interim period	August 25, 2019	11th in West, 22nd overall	(United States) Robin Fraser	August 25, 2019

== Regular season ==
=== Format ===
Each club played 34 games, including 17 home games and 17 away games. Teams faced each of their conference opponents twice during the season and non-conference opponents once. Half of the conference games were played at home, and half of the non-conference games were played away from home.

=== Conference standings ===
==== Eastern Conference ====
2019 MLS Eastern Conference standings
Pos	Team	Pld	W	L	T	GF	GA	GD	Pts	Qualification
1	New York City FC	34	18	6	10	63	42	+21	64	Qualification for the conference semifinals
2	Atlanta United FC	34	18	12	4	58	43	+15	58	Qualification for the first round
3	Philadelphia Union	34	16	11	7	58	50	+8	55	Qualification for the first round
4	Toronto FC	34	13	10	11	57	52	+5	50	Qualification for the first round
5	D.C. United	34	13	10	11	42	38	+4	50	Qualification for the first round
6	New York Red Bulls	34	14	14	6	53	51	+2	48	Qualification for the first round
7	New England Revolution	34	11	11	12	50	57	−7	45	Qualification for the first round
8	Chicago Fire	34	10	12	12	55	47	+8	42	
9	Montreal Impact	34	12	17	5	47	60	−13	41	
10	Columbus Crew SC	34	10	16	8	39	47	−8	38	
11	Orlando City SC	34	9	15	10	44	52	−8	37	
12	FC Cincinnati	34	6	22	6	31	75	−44	24	

Source: MLS
Rules for classification: 1) points; 2) total wins; 3) total goal differential; 4) total goals scored; 5) disciplinary points; 6) away goal differential; 7) away goals scored; 8) home goals scored; 9) home goal differential; 10) coin toss or drawing of lots.

==== Western Conference ====
2019 MLS Western Conference standings
Pos	Team	Pld	W	L	T	GF	GA	GD	Pts	Qualification
1	Los Angeles FC	34	21	4	9	85	37	+48	72	Qualification for the conference semifinals
2	Seattle Sounders FC	34	16	10	8	51	49	+2	56	Qualification for the first round
3	Real Salt Lake	34	16	13	5	45	41	+4	53	Qualification for the first round
4	Minnesota United FC	34	15	11	8	52	42	+10	53	Qualification for the first round
5	LA Galaxy	34	16	15	3	56	55	+1	51	Qualification for the first round
6	Portland Timbers	34	14	13	7	49	48	+1	49	Qualification for the first round
7	FC Dallas	34	13	12	9	48	46	+2	48	Qualification for the first round
8	San Jose Earthquakes	34	13	16	5	51	52	−1	44	
9	Colorado Rapids	34	12	16	6	57	60	−3	42	
10	Houston Dynamo	34	12	18	4	45	57	−12	40	
11	Sporting Kansas City	34	10	16	8	49	67	−18	38	
12	Vancouver Whitecaps FC	34	8	16	10	37	58	−21	34	

Source: MLS
Rules for classification: 1) points; 2) total wins; 3) total goal differential; 4) total goals scored; 5) disciplinary points; 6) away goal differential; 7) away goals scored; 8) home goals scored; 9) home goal differential; 10) coin toss or drawing of lots

=== Overall table ===
The leading team in this table wins the Supporters' Shield.

2019 MLS regular season standings
Pos	Team	Pld	W	L	T	GF	GA	GD	Pts	
1	Los Angeles FC (S)	34	21	4	9	85	37	+48	72	Qualification for the CONCACAF Champions League
2	New York City FC	34	18	6	10	63	42	+21	64	Qualification for the CONCACAF Champions League
3	Atlanta United FC (U)	34	18	12	4	58	43	+15	58	Qualification for the CONCACAF Champions League
4	Seattle Sounders FC (C)	34	16	10	8	52	49	+3	56	Qualification for the CONCACAF Champions League
5	Philadelphia Union	34	16	11	7	58	50	+8	55	
6	Real Salt Lake	34	16	13	5	46	41	+5	53	
7	Minnesota United FC	34	15	11	8	52	43	+9	53	
8	LA Galaxy	34	16	15	3	58	59	−1	51	
9	Toronto FC	34	13	10	11	57	52	+5	50	
10	D.C. United	34	13	10	11	42	38	+4	50	
11	Portland Timbers	34	14	13	7	52	49	+3	49	
12	New York Red Bulls	34	14	14	6	53	51	+2	48	
13	FC Dallas	34	13	12	9	54	46	+8	48	
14	New England Revolution	34	11	11	12	50	57	−7	45	
15	San Jose Earthquakes	34	13	16	5	52	55	−3	44	
16	Colorado Rapids	34	12	16	6	58	63	−5	42	
17	Chicago Fire	34	10	12	12	55	47	+8	42	
18	Montreal Impact (V)	34	12	17	5	47	60	−13	41	Qualification for the CONCACAF Champions League
19	Houston Dynamo	34	12	18	4	49	59	−10	40	
20	Columbus Crew SC	34	10	16	8	39	47	−8	38	
21	Sporting Kansas City	34	10	16	8	49	67	−18	38	
22	Orlando City SC	34	9	15	10	44	52	−8	37	
23	Vancouver Whitecaps FC	34	8	16	10	37	59	−22	34	
24	FC Cincinnati	34	6	22	6	31	75	−44	24	

Source: MLS
Rules for classification: 1) points; 2) total wins; 3) total goal differential; 4) total goals scored; 5) disciplinary points; 6) away goals scored; 7) away goal differential; 8) coin toss or drawing of lots
(C) MLS Cup champions; (S) Supporters' Shield winners; (U) U.S. Open Cup winners; (V) Canadian Championship winners

=== Fixtures and results ===
Home \ Away	ATL	CHI	CIN	COL	CLB	DAL	DC	HOU	LA	LFC	MIN	MTL	NE	NYC	NY	ORL	PHI	POR	RSL	SEA	SJ	SKC	TOR	VAN
Atlanta United FC	—	2–0	1–1	1–0	1–3	1–2	2–0	5–0	3–0	—	3–0	2–1	3–1	2–1	3–3	1–0	1–1	—	—	—	3–1	—	2–0	—
Chicago Fire	5–1	—	1–2	4–1	2–2	4–0	0–0	—	—	—	2–0	3–2	5–0	1–1	1–0	1–1	2–0	—	1–1	2–4	—	—	2–2	1–1
FC Cincinnati	0–2	0–0	—	—	1–3	—	1–4	3–2	0–2	—	—	2–1	0–2	1–4	0–2	1–1	0–2	3–0	0–3	—	—	1–1	1–5	1–2
Colorado Rapids	—	—	3–1	—	3–2	3–0	2–3	1–4	2–1	1–0	1–0	6–3	1–2	1–2	—	—	—	3–3	2–3	2–0	2–1	1–1	—	2–3
Columbus Crew SC	2–0	1–1	2–2	—	—	1–0	0–1	—	3–1	0–3	—	2–1	1–0	2–2	1–1	0–2	2–0	1–3	—	1–2	—	0–1	2–2	—
FC Dallas	—	—	3–1	2–1	—	—	2–0	5–1	2–0	1–1	5–3	—	1–1	1–1	1–3	—	—	2–1	0–0	2–1	0–0	6–0	3–0	2–2
D.C. United	2–0	3–3	0–0	—	3–1	—	—	—	2–1	0–4	—	0–0	2–2	0–2	1–2	1–0	1–5	—	5–0	2–0	1–1	1–0	1–1	—
Houston Dynamo	—	0–1	—	2–2	2–0	2–1	2–1	—	4–2	1–3	2–0	2–1	—	—	4–0	2–1	—	1–1	1–1	0–1	2–1	1–1	—	3–2
LA Galaxy	—	2–1	—	0–1	—	2–0	—	2–1	—	3–2	3–2	2–1	1–2	0–2	—	—	2–0	2–1	2–1	2–2	1–3	7–2	2–0	3–4
Los Angeles FC	4–3	0–0	2–0	3–1	—	2–0	—	3–1	3–3	—	0–2	4–2	—	—	4–2	—	—	4–1	2–1	4–1	4–0	2–1	1–1	6–1
Minnesota United FC	—	—	7–1	1–0	1–0	1–0	1–0	1–0	0–0	1–1	—	—	—	3–3	—	1–1	2–3	1–0	3–1	1–1	3–1	2–1	—	0–0
Montreal Impact	1–1	1–0	0–1	—	1–0	3–3	0–3	—	—	—	2–3	—	0–0	0–2	3–0	0–3	4–0	2–1	2–1	2–1	—	—	0–2	2–1
New England Revolution	0–2	2–1	0–2	—	0–2	—	1–1	2–1	—	0–2	2–1	0–3	—	2–0	1–0	4–1	1–1	—	0–0	—	3–1	—	1–1	4–0
New York City FC	4–1	1–0	5–2	—	1–0	—	0–0	3–2	—	2–2	—	0–0	2–1	—	2–1	1–1	4–2	0–1	—	3–0	2–1	3–1	1–1	—
New York Red Bulls	1–0	3–1	1–0	0–2	2–3	—	0–0	—	3–2	—	1–2	1–2	1–1	2–1	—	0–1	2–0	—	4–0	—	4–1	—	2–0	2–2
Orlando City SC	0–1	2–5	5–1	4–3	1–0	2–0	1–2	—	0–1	2–2	—	1–3	3–3	2–2	0–1	—	1–3	—	—	—	—	1–0	0–2	1–0
Philadelphia Union	3–1	2–0	2–0	1–1	3–0	2–1	3–1	2–1	—	1–1	—	3–0	6–1	1–2	3–2	2–2	—	1–3	—	0–0	—	—	1–3	—
Portland Timbers	0–2	3–2	—	2–2	—	1–0	0–1	4–0	4–0	2–3	0–0	—	2–2	—	0–2	1–1	—	—	1–0	1–2	3–1	2–1	—	3–1
Real Salt Lake	2–1	—	—	2–0	1–0	2–4	—	2–1	1–2	0–2	1–1	—	—	3–1	—	2–1	4–0	1–2	—	3–0	1–0	2–0	3–0	1–0
Seattle Sounders FC	2–1	—	4–1	2–0	—	0–0	—	1–0	4–3	1–1	1–0	—	3–3	—	4–2	2–1	—	1–2	1–0	—	2–2	2–3	3–2	1–0
San Jose Earthquakes	—	4–1	1–0	3–1	1–1	2–2	—	2–0	3–0	0–5	0–3	1–2	—	—	—	3–0	1–2	3–0	1–0	0–1	—	4–1	—	3–1
Sporting Kansas City	0–3	1–0	—	2–3	—	0–2	—	1–0	0–2	1–5	1–0	7–1	4–4	—	2–2	—	2–0	2–2	1–2	3–2	2–1	—	—	1–1
Toronto FC	3–2	2–2	2–1	3–2	1–0	—	0–0	1–3	—	—	4–3	2–1	3–2	4–0	3–1	1–1	1–2	1–2	—	—	1–2	2–2	—	—
Vancouver Whitecaps FC	0–1	—	—	2–2	1–1	2–1	1–0	2–1	0–2	1–0	2–3	—	—	1–3	—	—	1–1	1–0	0–1	0–0	1–3	0–3	1–1	—

Source: MLS
Legend: Blue = home team win; Yellow = draw; Red = away team win.

== MLS Cup playoffs ==
=== Format ===
The MLS Cup playoffs were expanded from 12 teams to 14 for the 2019 season, eliminating the use of two-legged series and re-seeding in favor of a shorter playoff format. The top seven teams in each conference advanced to a single elimination bracket, with the top team in each conference earning a first round bye. MLS Cup took place on November 10, 2019.

=== Bracket ===
First round October 19–20	Conference semifinals October 23–24
E1	New York City FC	1
E4	Toronto FC	2
E4	Toronto FC (a.e.t.)	5
E5	D.C. United	1
Eastern Conference
E2	Atlanta United FC	1
E7	New England Revolution	0
E2	Atlanta United FC	2
E3	Philadelphia Union	0
E3	Philadelphia Union (a.e.t.)	4
E6	New York Red Bulls	3
W1	Los Angeles FC	5
W5	LA Galaxy	3
W4	Minnesota United FC	1
W5	LA Galaxy	2
Western Conference
W2	Seattle Sounders FC (a.e.t.)	4
W7	FC Dallas	3
W2	Seattle Sounders FC	2
W3	Real Salt Lake	0
W3	Real Salt Lake	2
W6	Portland Timbers	1

Conference finals October 29–30
E4	Toronto FC	2
E2	Atlanta United FC	1
W1	Los Angeles FC	1
W2	Seattle Sounders FC	3

MLS Cup; November 10
E4	Toronto FC	1
W2	Seattle Sounders FC	3

Note: The higher seeded team hosted matches, with the MLS Cup host determined by overall points.
Source: 2019 MLS Cup Playoffs Bracket

=== MLS Cup ===
November 10, 2019
12:00 p.m. PST

Seattle Sounders FC	3–1	Toronto FC
Leerdam 57'; Rodríguez 76'; Ruidíaz 90'	Report	Altidore 90+3'

CenturyLink Field, Seattle, Washington
Attendance: 69,274
Referee: Allen Chapman

== Attendance ==
=== Average home attendances ===
As of October 6, 2019

Pos.	Team	GP	Cumulative	High	Low	Mean
1	Atlanta United FC	17	892,663	72,548	42,537	52,510
2	Seattle Sounders FC	17	684,192	50,072	37,722	40,247
3	FC Cincinnati	17	464,720	32,250	25,095	27,336
4	Portland Timbers	17	428,706	25,218	25,218	25,218
5	Toronto FC	17	425,816	28,989	22,651	25,048
6	LA Galaxy	17	394,477	27,088	19,015	23,205
7	Orlando City SC	17	386,940	25,527	22,341	22,761
8	Los Angeles FC	17	378,265	22,757	22,001	22,251
9	New York City FC	17	358,820	28,895	18,113	21,107
10	Minnesota United FC	17	335,291	19,906	19,600	19,723
11	Vancouver Whitecaps FC	17	331,745	27,837	16,138	19,514
12	San Jose Earthquakes	17	319,272	50,850	15,232	18,781
13	Sporting Kansas City	17	316,211	19,979	17,083	18,601
14	Real Salt Lake	17	308,050	20,838	15,949	18,121
15	D.C. United	17	301,644	20,600	12,521	17,744
16	New York Red Bulls	17	293,769	20,128	11,115	17,281
17	Philadelphia Union	17	290,883	19,145	12,890	17,111
18	New England Revolution	17	284,535	28,602	9,422	16,737
19	Montreal Impact	17	258,560	19,619	11,996	16,171
20	Houston Dynamo	17	266,464	21,777	12,601	15,674
21	Columbus Crew SC	17	250,424	20,865	9,687	14,856
22	FC Dallas	17	252,313	19,096	11,911	14,842
23	Colorado Rapids	17	242,833	16,998	10,794	14,284
24	Chicago Fire	17	209,516	18,232	6,074	12,324
–	Total	408	8,676,109	72,548	6,074	21,265

=== Highest attendances ===
Regular season

Rank	Home team	Score	Away team	Attendance	Date	Week	Stadium
1	Atlanta United	3–0	LA Galaxy	72,548	August 3, 2019	22	Mercedes-Benz Stadium
2	Atlanta United	1–1	FC Cincinnati	70,382	March 10, 2019	2	Mercedes-Benz Stadium
3	Atlanta United	1–0	Orlando City SC	68,152	May 12, 2019	11	Mercedes-Benz Stadium
4	Atlanta United	3–3	New York Red Bulls	68,077	July 7, 2019	18	Mercedes-Benz Stadium
5	Atlanta United	1–3	Columbus Crew SC	68,046	September 14, 2019	28	Mercedes-Benz Stadium
6	Atlanta United	2–0	Chicago Fire	67,502	June 1, 2019	14	Mercedes-Benz Stadium
7	San Jose Earthquakes	3–0	LA Galaxy	50,850	June 29, 2019	17	Stanford Stadium
8	Seattle Sounders	1–2	Portland Timbers	50,072	July 21, 2019	20	CenturyLink Field
9	Seattle Sounders	1–0	Minnesota United	47,297	October 6, 2019	31	CenturyLink Field
10	Seattle Sounders	4–3	LA Galaxy	46,673	September 1, 2019	26	CenturyLink Field

== Player statistics ==
=== Goals ===
Rank	Player	Club	Goals
1	(Mexico) Carlos Vela	Los Angeles FC	34
2	(Sweden) Zlatan Ibrahimović	LA Galaxy	30
3	(Venezuela) Josef Martínez	Atlanta United FC	27
4	(Uruguay) Diego Rossi	Los Angeles FC	16
5	(Brazil) Héber	New York City FC	15
5	(Poland) Kacper Przybyłko	Philadelphia Union	15
5	(United States) Chris Wondolowski	San Jose Earthquakes	15
8	(Sierra Leone) Kei Kamara	Colorado Rapids	14
9	(Colombia) Mauro Manotas	Houston Dynamo	13
9	(United States) C.J. Sapong	Chicago Fire	13
9	(United States) Gyasi Zardes	Columbus Crew SC	13

=== Hat-tricks ===
Player	For	Against	Score	Date
(England) Wayne Rooney	D.C. United	Real Salt Lake	5−0	March 16
(Hungary) Krisztián Németh	Sporting Kansas City	Montreal Impact	7−1	March 30
(Mexico) Carlos Vela	Los Angeles FC	San Jose Earthquakes	5−0	March 30
(Uruguay) Diego Rossi	Los Angeles FC	D.C. United	4−0	April 6
(United States) Chris Wondolowski^{4}	San Jose Earthquakes	Chicago Fire	4−1	May 18
(Scotland) Johnny Russell	Sporting Kansas City	Seattle Sounders FC	3−2	May 26
(Sweden) Zlatan Ibrahimović	LA Galaxy	Los Angeles FC	3−2	July 19
(Sierra Leone) Kei Kamara	Colorado Rapids	Montreal Impact	6−3	August 3
(Sweden) Zlatan Ibrahimović	LA Galaxy	Sporting Kansas City	7−2	September 15
(Romania) Alexandru Mitriță	New York City FC	Atlanta United FC	4−1	September 25
(Mexico) Carlos Vela	Los Angeles FC	Colorado Rapids	3−1	October 6

=== Assists ===
Rank	Player	Club	Assists
1	(Argentina) Maximiliano Moralez	New York City FC	20
2	(Argentina) Diego Valeri	Portland Timbers	16
3	(Colombia) Michael Barrios	FC Dallas	15
3	(Mexico) Carlos Vela	Los Angeles FC	15
5	(Spain) Carles Gil	New England Revolution	14
6	(Argentina) Cristian Espinoza	San Jose Earthquakes	13
7	(Argentina) Nicolás Gaitán	Chicago Fire	12
7	(Slovakia) Ján Greguš	Minnesota United FC	12
7	(Germany) Julian Gressel	Atlanta United FC	12
7	(Uruguay) Nicolás Lodeiro	Seattle Sounders FC	12
7	(Spain) Alejandro Pozuelo	Toronto FC	12

=== Shutouts ===
Rank	Player	Club	Shutouts
1	(United States) Brad Guzan	Atlanta United FC	14
1	(United States) Bill Hamid	D.C. United	14
3	(Italy) Vito Mannone	Minnesota United FC	11
4	(Switzerland) Stefan Frei	Seattle Sounders FC	10
4	(United States) Nick Rimando	Real Salt Lake	10
6	(United States) Tyler Miller	Los Angeles FC	9
6	(United States) Luis Robles	New York Red Bulls	9
8	(United States) David Bingham	LA Galaxy	8
8	(United States) Jesse González	FC Dallas	8
10	(United States) Evan Bush	Montreal Impact	7
10	(United States) Sean Johnson	New York City FC	7
10	(United States) Brian Rowe	Orlando City SC	7
10	(Argentina) Daniel Vega	San Jose Earthquakes	7

== Awards ==
=== Player / Team of the Week ===
- **Bold** denotes League Player of the Week.
- Italics denotes Audi Player Performance of the Week.

Team of the Week
Week	Goalkeeper	Defenders	Midfielders	Forwards	Bench	Coach
1	(United States) Howard (COL)	(Argentina) Sauro (CLB) (France) Brillant (DC) (France) Diallo (MTL)	(Uruguay) Lodeiro (SEA) (United States) Feilhaber (COL) (Algeria) Taïder (MTL) (United States) Bradley (TOR) (United States) Arriola (DC)	(Colombia) Quintero (MIN) (United States) **Morris** (SEA)	(United States) Hamid (DC) (Costa Rica) Calvo (MIN) (United States) Steres (LA) (Colombia) Atuesta (LAFC) (Spain) V. Rodríguez (SEA) (United States) Mueller (ORL) (Mexico) E. Álvarez (LA)	(United States) Ben Olsen (DC)
2	(United States) Sean Johnson (NYC)	(Madagascar) Métanire (MIN) (Slovenia) Struna (HOU) (United States) Hagglund (CIN) (Netherlands) Leerdam (SEA)	(United States) Pomykal (DAL) (Colombia) Atuesta (LAFC) (Ecuador) Gruezo (DAL)	(Mexico) **Vela** (LAFC) (United States) Zardes (CLB) (Colombia) Quintero (MIN)	(United States) Hamid (DC) (United States) Melia (SKC) (United States) Herrera (RSL) (Cuba) Alonso (MIN) (South Korea) Hwang (VAN) (United States) Saief (CIN) (Portugal) Nani (ORL)	(United States) Caleb Porter (CLB)
3	(United States) Richey (CIN)	(Argentina) Sauro (CLB) (United States) Robinson (ATL) (Argentina) Jara (DC)	(United States) Lletget (LA) (Venezuela) Moreno (DC) (Uruguay) Lodeiro (SEA) (United States) Muyl (NY)	(Argentina) Piatti (MTL) (England) **Rooney** (DC) (Honduras) Elis (HOU)	(United States) Steffen (CLB) (Costa Rica) Waston (CIN) (United States) M. Rodríguez (HOU) (Mexico) Ulloa (CIN) (United States) Akinola (TOR) (United States) Morris (SEA) (Mexico) Vela (LAFC)	(South Africa) Alan Koch (CIN)
4	(United States) Rowe (ORL)	(United States) Hollingshead (DAL) (United States) Zimmerman (LAFC) (Brazil) Ruan (ORL)	(United States) Saief (CIN) (United States) Kljestan (ORL) (United States) Bedoya (PHI) (United States) Pomykal (DAL) (United States) Saucedo (RSL)	(Ghana) **Accam** (PHI) (The Gambia) Manneh (CIN)	(United States) Rimando (RSL) (United States) Garza (CIN) (England) Elliott (PHI) (Peru) Ascues (ORL) (Colombia) Atuesta (LAFC) (Colombia) Barrios (DAL) (Uruguay) Rossi (LAFC)	(South Africa) Alan Koch (CIN)
5	(Switzerland) Frei (SEA)	(United States) Anibaba (NE) (Germany) Schweinsteiger (CHI) (Canada) Henry (VAN)	(Spain) Pozuelo (TOR) (United States) Pomykal (DAL) (Mexico) Fabián (PHI) (Mexico) **Vela** (LAFC)	(Guinea-Bissau) Gerso (SKC) (Hungary) Németh (SKC) (Honduras) Elis (HOU)	(United States) Steffen (CLB) (United States) Birnbaum (DC) (United States) McCarty (CHI) (Spain) Gil (NE) (England) Rooney (DC) (Scotland) Russell (SKC) (Sweden) Ibrahimović (LA)	(United States) Jim Curtin (PHI)
6	(United States) Maurer (DAL)	(United States) Steres (LA) (United States) Opara (MIN) (Brazil) Ruan (ORL)	(Mexico) Vela (LAFC) (Serbia) Katai (CHI) (United States) Bedoya (PHI) (Portugal) Nani (ORL)	(Uruguay) **Rossi** (LAFC) (Sweden) Ibrahimović (LA) (Argentina) Espinoza (SJ)	(United States) Steffen (CLB) (Italy) Mannone (MIN) (Germany) Wagner (PHI) (United States) Bassett (COL) (Panama) Godoy (SJ) (Jamaica) Mattocks (CIN) (United States) Altidore (TOR)	(Argentina) Matias Almeyda (SJ)
7	(United States) Bush (MTL)	(Norway) Skjelvik (LA) (Germany) Schweinsteiger (CHI) (England) Onuoha (RSL)	(Argentina) **Barco** (ATL) (Argentina) T. Martínez (HOU) (Argentina) L. Rodríguez (DC) (Mexico) Vela (LAFC)	(Libya) Tajouri-Shradi (NYC) (Sweden) Ibrahimović (LA) (United States) Bruin (SEA)	(United States) Miller (LAFC) (Canada) Piette (MTL) (United States) Feilhaber (COL) (United States) Busio (SKC) (Austria) Royer (NY) (Colombia) Ferreira (DAL) (United States) Altidore (TOR)	(France) Rémi Garde (MTL)
8	(United States) J. González (DAL)	(United States) Hedges (DAL) (England) Elliott (PHI) (Paraguay) Moreira (POR)	(Spain) **Pozuelo** (TOR) (Canada) Kaye (LAFC) (Colombia) Atuesta (LAFC) (Slovakia) Rusnák (RSL)	(Netherlands) Hoesen (SJ) (Brazil) Héber (NYC) (Mexico) Vela (LAFC)	(United States) Cropper (NE) (United States) Araujo (LA) (Iraq) Adnan (VAN) (Mexico) Dos Santos (LA) (Colombia) Barrios (DAL) (Argentina) Gaitán (CHI) (Canada) Hamilton (TOR)	(United States) Luchi Gonzalez (DAL)
9	(United States) **Bush** (MTL)	(Australia) B. Smith (SEA) (United States) Lade (NY) (Canada) Henry (VAN) (Madagascar) Métanire (MIN)	(Argentina) Blanco (POR) (Mexico) Dos Santos (LA) (United States) Nagbe (ATL) (United States) Salinas (SJ)	(Brazil) Héber (NYC) (Colombia) Manotas (HOU)	(United States) J. González (DAL) (France) Diallo (MTL) (France) Traore (LA) (United States) Yueill (SJ) (Hungary) Németh (SKC) (Colombia) Caicedo (NE) (United States) Ebobisse (POR)	(France) Rémi Garde (MTL)
10	(United States) Clark (POR)	(United States) Lima (SJ) (United States) Opara (MIN) (Argentina) Jara (DC)	(United States) Sweat (NYC) (Argentina) **Barco** (ATL) (Bosnia and Herzegovina) Medunjanin (PHI) (Canada) Osorio (TOR)	(Colombia) Manotas (HOU) (Venezuela) J. Martínez (ATL) (Poland) Przybyłko (PHI)	(Brazil) Coronel (PHI) (Canada) Henry (VAN) (United States) McCarty (CHI) (United States) Delgado (TOR) (United States) C. Roldan (SEA) (Germany) Rzatkowski (NY) (Sweden) Ibrahimović (LA)	(United States) Jim Curtin (PHI)
11	(United States) Guzan (ATL)	(Costa Rica) Calvo (CHI) (United States) Birnbaum (DC) (Sweden) Tinnerholm (NYC)	(Mexico) Ulloa (CIN) (Argentina) **Gaitán** (CHI) (United States) C. Roldan (SEA) (Cape Verde) Monteiro (PHI)	(Paraguay) Villalba (ATL) (Colombia) Montero (VAN) (Mexico) Vela (LAFC)	(Canada) Crépeau (VAN) (Canada) Henry (VAN) (Canada) Kaye (LAFC) (Argentina) Higuaín (CLB) (United States) Arriola (DC) (Serbia) Katai (CHI) (Liberia) Sam Johnson (RSL)	(Netherlands) Frank de Boer (ATL)
12	(Canada) Crépeau (VAN)	(Sweden) Lundqvist (HOU) (England) Onuoha (RSL) (Egypt) Tarek (NY) (Madagascar) Métanire (MIN)	(United States) Saucedo (RSL) (Argentina) Vera (HOU) (United States) Yueill (SJ) (United States) Finlay (MIN)	(United States) **Wondolowski** (SJ) (Mexico) Vela (LAFC)	(Switzerland) Frei (SEA) (United States) Jones (NE) (Australia) B. Smith (SEA) (Canada) Kaye (LAFC) (United States) Lewis (COL) (Argentina) Blanco (POR) (Canada) Akindele (ORL)	(United States) Mike Petke (RSL)
13	(United States) Robles (NY)	(Iraq) Adnan (VAN) (Madagascar) Métanire (MIN) (United States) Blackmon (LAFC)	(Mexico) Vela (LAFC) (Mexico) Dos Santos (LA) (United States) Saucedo (RSL) (Scotland) Nicholson (COL)	(Argentina) Fernández (POR) (United States) Wondolowski (SJ) (Scotland) **Russell** (SKC)	(United States) Bingham (LA) (United States) Kallman (MIN) (Netherlands) Leerdam (SEA) (Colombia) Atuesta (LAFC) (Colombia) Chará (POR) (United States) White (NY) (Romania) Mitriță (NYC)	(Canada) Marc Dos Santos (VAN)
14	(Jamaica) Blake (PHI)	(United States) Lima (SJ) (United States) Robinson (ATL) (Panama) Murillo (NY)	(Canada) Akindele (ORL) (Spain) Gil (NE) (Paraguay) Kaku (NY) (Portugal) Santos (CLB)	(Brazil) Shinyashiki (COL) (Venezuela) **J. Martínez** (ATL) (Mexico) Vela (LAFC)	(United States) Guzan (ATL) (Costa Rica) Segura (DC) (Canada) Fraser (TOR) (Colombia) Atuesta (LAFC) (Panama) Browne (MTL) (Colombia) Barrios (DAL) (Sweden) Ibrahimović (LA)	(Netherlands) Frank de Boer (ATL)
15	(United States) Howard (COL)	(United States) Trusty (PHI) (Ghana) Abubakar (COL) (Sweden) Tinnerholm (NYC)	(Argentina) Moralez (NYC) (Algeria) Taïder (MTL) (Spain) Pozuelo (TOR) (Brazil) **Ilsinho** (PHI)	(Sweden) Eriksson (SJ) (Sierra Leone) K. Kamara (COL) (Brazil) Héber (NYC)	(United States) Bush (MTL) (United States) Cannon (DAL) (United States) Thompson (SJ) (England) Price (COL) (Finland) Ring (NYC) (Chile) Gutiérrez (SKC) (Ghana) Atuahene (DAL)	(United States) Jim Curtin (PHI)
16	(United States) Melia (SKC)	(Iraq) Adnan (VAN) (Brazil) Bressan (DAL) (Ghana) Abubakar (COL)	(Argentina) **Valeri** (POR) (United States) Pomykal (DAL) (United States) Kitchen (LA) (Argentina) F. Álvarez (LA)	(Colombia) Ferreira (DAL) (Sierra Leone) K. Kamara (COL) (Costa Rica) Loría (POR)	(United States) Westberg (TOR) (United States) Araujo (LA) (Hungary) Baráth (SKC) (Peru) Reyna (VAN) (Guinea-Bissau) Gerso (SKC) (Senegal) Badji (DAL) (Argentina) Fernández (POR)	(United States) Luchi Gonzalez (DAL)
17	(United States) Robles (NY)	(United States) Vines (COL) (United States) Opara (MIN) (Netherlands) Leerdam (SEA)	(Georgia (country)) **Vako** (SJ) (Slovakia) Greguš (MIN) (Colombia) Chará (POR) (Argentina) Moralez (NYC)	(Iraq) Meram (ATL) (England) Rooney (DC) (Argentina) Castellanos (NYC)	(United States) MacMath (VAN) (United States) Glad (RSL) (Portugal) Nani (ORL) (United States) Thompson (SJ) (Colombia) Quintero (MIN) (Nigeria) Okwonkwo (MTL) (United States) Bunbury (NE)	(Argentina) Matías Almeyda (SJ)
18	(United States) Clark (POR)	(United States) Herrera (RSL) (United States) Opara (MIN) (Colombia) Segura (LAFC)	(Uruguay) Lodeiro (SEA) (United States) Pomykal (DAL) (Canada) Kaye (LAFC) (Argentina) Ledesma (CIN)	(United States) Toye (MIN) (Poland) Przybyłko (PHI) (Mexico) **Vela** (LAFC)	(United States) Rimando (RSL) (Democratic Republic of the Congo) Mabiala (POR) (Argentina) Moralez (NYC) (Argentina) Gaitán (CHI) (Honduras) Elis (HOU) (United States) Sapong (CHI) (Sweden) Ibrahimović (LA)	(United States) Bob Bradley (LAFC)
19	(Italy) Mannone (MIN)	(Libya) El-Munir (LAFC) (Costa Rica) Waston (CIN) (United States) Opara (MIN)	(Georgia (country)) Vako (SJ) (United States) C. Roldan (SEA) (United States) Yueill (SJ) (Peru) Ascues (ORL)	(Guinea-Bissau) Gerso (SKC) (Norway) Diomande (LAFC) (Venezuela) **Savarino** (RSL)	(United States) Clark (POR) (United States) Bingham (LA) (Senegal) Sané (ORL) (United States) O. Gonzalez (TOR) (Spain) Pozuelo (TOR) (United States) Arriola (DC) (Austria) Royer (NY)	(Argentina) Matías Almeyda (SJ)
20	(United States) Turner (NE)	(Germany) Wagner (PHI) (United States) Farrell (NE) (Egypt) Tarek (NY)	(Spain) Gil (NE) (Colombia) Ferreira (DAL) (Georgia (country)) Vako (SJ) (Germany) Gressel (ATL)	(Argentina) Fernández (POR) (Sweden) **Ibrahimović** (LA) (Venezuela) J. Martínez (ATL)	(United States) Guzan (ATL) (Democratic Republic of the Congo) Mabiala (POR) (United States) Sands (NYC) (United States) Dotson (MIN) (Ghana) Accam (CLB) (Romania) Mitriță (NYC) (Colombia) Manotas (HOU)	(Netherlands) Frank de Boer (ATL)
21	(United States) J. González (DAL)	(Cameroon) Nouhou (SEA) (Slovenia) Delamea (NE) (Canada) Brault-Guillard (MTL)	(Finland) **Lappalainen** (MTL) (Colombia) Atuesta (LAFC) (Paraguay) Paredes (POR) (Finland) Ring (NYC)	(Portugal) Santos (CLB) (Georgia (country)) Vako (SJ) (Mexico) Vela (LAFC)	(Italy) Mannone (MIN) (United States) Lima (SJ) (Brazil) Everton Luiz (RSL) (Spain) Gil (NE) (Argentina) Valeri (POR) (United States) DeLeon (TOR) (Nigeria) Okwonkwo (MTL)	(Venezuela) Giovanni Savarese (POR)
22	(United States) Robles (NY)	(United States) Harvey (LAFC) (United States) Robinson (ATL) (United States) Opara (MIN)	(Colombia) Atuesta (LAFC) (Mexico) Fabián (PHI) (Chile) Gutiérrez (SKC) (England) Price (COL)	(Canada) Akindele (ORL) (Sierra Leone) K. Kamara (COL) (Venezuela) Savarino (RSL)	(Curaçao) Room (CLB) (United States) Besler (RSL) (South Korea) Hwang (VAN) (Argentina) Gaitán (CHI) (United States) **Bedoya** (PHI) (Paraguay) Kaku (NY) (United States) Hurtado (SKC)	(United States) Jim Curtin (PHI)
23	(Poland) Tytoń (CIN)	(England) Elliott (PHI) (Germany) Schweinsteiger (CHI) (United States) Rosenberry (COL)	(Portugal) Santos (CLB) (Venezuela) Zambrano (POR) (Spain) Gil (NE) (Colombia) Barrios (DAL)	(United States) Baird (RSL) (Venezuela) **J. Martínez** (ATL) (Mexico) Vela (LAFC)	(United States) Hamid (DC) (France) Brillant (DC) (Germany) Gressel (ATL) (Peru) Ascues (ORL) (United States) Pomykal (DAL) (Argentina) Castellanos (NYC) (Chile) Rubio (COL)	(United States) Luchi Gonzalez (DAL)
24	(United States) Turner (NE)	(United States) Robinson (ATL) (United States) Opara (MIN) (England) Onuoha (RSL)	(Finland) Lappalainen (MTL) (United States) Nagbe (ATL) (Argentina) Castellanos (NYC) (Scotland) Russell (SKC)	(Hungary) Nikolić (CHI) (Sweden) **Ibrahimović** (LA) (Norway) Diomande (LAFC)	(United States) Rowe (ORL) (Argentina) G. Martínez (ATL) (Peru) Reyna (VAN) (Colombia) Manotas (HOU) (Chile) Rubio (COL) (United States) Altidore (TOR) (Argentina) Fernández (POR)	(Netherlands) Frank de Boer (ATL)
25	(Canada) Crépeau (VAN)	(United States) Morrow (TOR) (Peru) Callens (NYC) (United States) Robinson (ATL)	(Ghana) Blessing (LAFC) (Argentina) Moralez (NYC) (Colombia) Ferreira (DAL) (Argentina) Barco (ATL)	(Poland) Przybyłko (PHI) (Sweden) Ibrahimović (LA) (Mexico) **Vela** (LAFC)	(United States) Rimando (RSL) (Sweden) Tinnerholm (NYC) (France) Zahibo (NE) (Sweden) Eriksson (SJ) (Czech Republic) Ondrášek (DAL) (United States) Zardes (CLB) (United States) Morris (SEA)	(Spain) Domè Torrent (NYC)
26	(Italy) Mannone (MIN)	(United States) Villafaña (POR) (New Zealand) T. Smith (COL) (United States) G. Smith (SKC)	(United States) Lewis (COL) (United States) C. Roldan (SEA) (Bosnia and Herzegovina) Medunjanin (PHI) (Argentina) Espinoza (SJ)	(Poland) Przybyłko (PHI) (Sweden) Ibrahimović (LA) (United States) **Toye** (MIN)	(United States) Turner (NE) (United States) Hollingshead (DAL) (United States) Aaronson (PHI) (Poland) Frankowski (CHI) (Romania) Mitriță (NYC) (Norway) O. Kamara (DC) (Czech Republic) Ondrášek (DAL)	(United States) Jim Curtin (PHI)
27	(United States) Turner (NE)	(United States) Vines (COL) (Brazil) Ruan (ORL) (United States) DeLeon (TOR)	(United States) Delgado (TOR) (Finland) Ring (NYC) (Colombia) Chará (POR) (Argentina) Valeri (POR)	(Paraguay) Medina (NYC) (Brazil) **Shinyashiki** (COL) (Uruguay) Rossi (LAFC)	(Switzerland) Frei (SEA) (Senegal) Sané (ORL) (United States) Farrell (NE) (United States) Rosenberry (COL) (United States) Williamson (POR) (Ghana) Blessing (LAFC) (Spain) Pozuelo (TOR)	(Spain) Domè Torrent (NYC)
28	(United States) Sean Johnson (NYC)	(Iraq) Adnan (VAN) (France) Brillant (DC) (United States) Rosenberry (COL)	(Portugal) Nani (ORL) (Spain) Gil (NE) (Costa Rica) Díaz (CLB) (Poland) Frankowski (CHI)	(United States) Morris (SEA) (Sweden) **Ibrahimović** (LA) (Colombia) Quintero (MIN)	(United States) Bingham (LA) (Ghana) Harrison (CLB) (Costa Rica) Cruz (CIN) (Uruguay) Lodeiro (SEA) (United States) Bradley (TOR) (Romania) Mitriță (NYC) (United States) Sapong (CHI)	(United States) Greg Vanney (TOR)
29	(Italy) Mannone (MIN)	(United States) O. Gonzalez (TOR) (Uruguay) Silva (RSL) (United States) Duncan (NY)	(Argentina) Pavón (LA) (England) Price (COL) (United States) Hyndman (ATL) (Honduras) García (HOU)	(England) Rooney (DC) (Venezuela) **J. Martínez** (ATL) (United States) Ramirez (HOU)	(United States) J. González (DAL) (New Zealand) T. Smith (COL) (France) Brillant (DC) (Slovakia) Greguš (MIN) (United States) Pomykal (DAL) (Austria) Royer (NY) (Sierra Leone) K. Kamara (COL)	(United States) Chris Armas (NY)
30	(United States) Turner (NE)	(United States) Farrell (NE) (New Zealand) Boxall (MIN) (France) Brillant (DC)	(Romania) Mitriță (NYC) (South Korea) Hwang (VAN) (Colombia) Atuesta (LAFC) (Argentina) Pavón (LA)	(United States) Ebobisse (POR) (Sierra Leone) K. Kamara (COL) (Mexico) **Vela** (LAFC)	(United States) Hamid (DC) (United States) Vines (COL) (United States) Duncan (NY) (United States) Dotson (MIN) (Portugal) Santos (CLB) (United States) Morris (SEA) (Argentina) Bou (NE)	(England) Adrian Heath (MIN)
31	(Poland) Tytoń (CIN)	(Democratic Republic of the Congo) Mabiala (POR) (Panama) Torres (SEA) (United States) Blackmon (LAFC)	(Poland) Frankowski (CHI) (Honduras) Acosta (DAL) (Argentina) Blanco (POR) (Germany) Gressel (ATL)	(Mexico) **Vela** (LAFC) (Czech Republic) Ondrášek (DAL) (Honduras) Elis (HOU)	(United States) Westberg (TOR) (United States) Toia (RSL) (United States) O. Gonzalez (TOR) (Colombia) Barrios (DAL) (Nigeria) Okwonkwo (MTL) (Argentina) Castellanos (NYC) (United States) Ramirez (HOU)	(United States) Luchi Gonzalez (DAL)

=== Goal of the Week ===
Goal of the Week
Week	Player	Club	Ref
1	(Brazil) Andre Shinyashiki	Colorado Rapids	
2	(United States) Memo Rodríguez	Houston Dynamo	
3	(Costa Rica) Allan Cruz	FC Cincinnati	
4	(The Gambia) Kekuta Manneh	FC Cincinnati	
5	(Spain) Alejandro Pozuelo	Toronto FC	
6	(Uruguay) Nicolás Lodeiro	Seattle Sounders FC	
7	(Argentina) Ezequiel Barco	Atlanta United FC	
8	(Spain) Alejandro Pozuelo	Toronto FC	
9	(New Zealand) Bill Tuiloma	Portland Timbers	
10	(Argentina) Ezequiel Barco	Atlanta United FC	
11	(Argentina) Gonzalo Martínez	Atlanta United FC	
12	(United States) Sebastián Saucedo	Real Salt Lake	
13	(Venezuela) Jefferson Savarino	Real Salt Lake	
14	(Bosnia and Herzegovina) Haris Medunjanin	Philadelphia Union	
15	(Canada) Jordan Hamilton	Toronto FC	
16	(Peru) Yordy Reyna	Vancouver Whitecaps FC	
17	(Nigeria) Orji Okwonkwo	Montreal Impact	
18	(Ghana) Ebenezer Ofori	New York City FC	
19	(Peru) Raúl Ruidíaz	Seattle Sounders FC	
20	(Sweden) Zlatan Ibrahimović	LA Galaxy	
21	(United States) Jordan Morris	Seattle Sounders FC	
22	(Slovakia) Albert Rusnák	Real Salt Lake	
23	(Canada) Theo Bair	Vancouver Whitecaps FC	
24	(Venezuela) Josef Martínez	Atlanta United FC	
25	(Mexico) Carlos Vela	Los Angeles FC	
26	(Venezuela) Josef Martínez	Atlanta United FC	
27	(United States) Benny Feilhaber	Sporting Kansas City	
28	(Uruguay) Nicolás Lodeiro	Seattle Sounders FC	
29	(Venezuela) Josef Martínez	Atlanta United FC	
30	(Germany) Julian Gressel	Atlanta United FC	
31	(Germany) Julian Gressel	Atlanta United FC	

=== Player of the Month ===
Month	Player	Club	Stats	Ref
March	(Mexico) Carlos Vela	Los Angeles FC	6 goals, 3 assists	
April	(Mexico) Carlos Vela	Los Angeles FC	5 goals, 2 assists	
May	(United States) Chris Wondolowski	San Jose Earthquakes	6 goals	
June	(Argentina) Maximiliano Moralez	New York City FC	3 goals, 6 assists	
July	(Venezuela) Josef Martínez	Atlanta United FC	7 goals	
August	(Venezuela) Josef Martínez	Atlanta United FC	6 goals	
September	(Mexico) Carlos Vela	Los Angeles FC	7 goals	

=== End-of-season awards ===
Award	Winner (club)	Ref
Most Valuable Player	Carlos Vela (Los Angeles FC)	
Defender of the Year	Ike Opara (Minnesota United FC)	
Goalkeeper of the Year	Vito Mannone (Minnesota United FC)	
Coach of the Year	Bob Bradley (Los Angeles FC)	
Rookie of the Year	Andre Shinyashiki (Colorado Rapids)	
Newcomer of the Year	Carles Gil (New England Revolution)	
Comeback Player of the Year	Jordan Morris (Seattle Sounders FC)	
Golden Boot	Carlos Vela (Los Angeles FC)	
Humanitarian of the Year	Matt Lampson (LA Galaxy)	
Referee of the Year	Allen Chapman	
Assistant Referee of the Year	Brian Dunn	
Goal of the Year	Josef Martínez (Atlanta United FC)	
Save of the Year	Nick Rimando (Real Salt Lake)	

=== MLS Best XI ===
Goalkeeper	Defenders	Midfielders	Forwards	Ref
(Italy) Vito Mannone, Minnesota	(United States) Ike Opara, Minnesota (United States) Miles Robinson, Atlanta (United States) Walker Zimmerman, LAFC	(Colombia) Eduard Atuesta, LAFC (Spain) Carles Gil, New England (Argentina) Maxi Moralez, New York City (Spain) Alejandro Pozuelo, Toronto	(Sweden) Zlatan Ibrahimović, LA Galaxy (Venezuela) Josef Martínez, Atlanta (Mexico) Carlos Vela, LAFC	

== Player transfers ==
=== SuperDraft ===
The MLS SuperDraft is an annual event, taking place in January of each year, in which the teams of Major League Soccer select players who have graduated from college or otherwise been signed by the league. The first two rounds of 2019 MLS SuperDraft were held on January 11 in Chicago. Rounds three and four of the 2019 SuperDraft were held via a conference call on January 14. FC Cincinnati selected Frankie Amaya with the first overall pick.

=== Allocation ranking ===
The allocation ranking is the mechanism used to determine which MLS club has first priority to acquire a player who is in the MLS allocation list. The MLS allocation list contains select U.S. National Team players and players transferred outside of MLS garnering a transfer fee of at least $500,000. The allocations are ranked in reverse order of finish for the 2018 season, taking playoff performance into account. As an expansion team, FC Cincinnati took the top spot.

Once the club uses its allocation ranking to acquire a player, it drops to the bottom of the list. A ranking can be traded provided that part of the compensation received in return is another club's ranking. At all times each club is assigned one ranking. The rankings reset at the end of each MLS season.

Original ranking	Current ranking	Club	Date allocation used (Rank on that date)	Player signed	Previous club	Ref
2	1	San Jose Earthquakes				
7	2	Minnesota United FC				
8	3	Houston Dynamo				
9	4	New England Revolution				
5	5	Chicago Fire				
11	6	Vancouver Whitecaps FC				
3	7	Orlando City SC				
13	8	Philadelphia Union				
4	9	Colorado Rapids				
15	10	FC Dallas				
16	11	Los Angeles FC				
17	12	Real Salt Lake				
18	13	Columbus Crew				
19	14	New York City FC				
20	15	Seattle Sounders FC				
21	16	Sporting Kansas City				
22	17	New York Red Bulls				
23	18	Portland Timbers				
24	19	Atlanta United FC				
1	20	FC Cincinnati				
12	21	LA Galaxy	April 11, 2019 (1)	(Costa Rica) Giancarlo González	(Italy) Bologna	
6	22	Toronto FC	December 27, 2018 (1)	(Belgium) Laurent Ciman	(France) Dijon	
6	22	Toronto FC	July 9, 2019 (1)	(United States) Omar Gonzalez	(Mexico) Pachuca	
14	23	D.C. United	August 7, 2019 (1)	(Norway) Ola Kamara	(China) Shenzhen F.C.	
10	24	Montreal Impact	August 7, 2019 (1)	(Canada) Ballou Tabla	(Spain) Barcelona B	

1. On December 10, 2018, Toronto FC acquired the number 2 allocation ranking from San Jose Earthquakes in exchange for the number 6 allocation ranking, $75,000 in general allocation money, and $75,000 in targeted allocation money.
2. On December 27, 2018, Toronto FC acquired the number 1 allocation ranking from FC Cincinnati in exchange for the number 2 allocation ranking and the number 30 overall selection in the 2019 MLS SuperDraft.
3. On January 23, 2019, Toronto FC acquired the number 1 allocation ranking, $150,000 in 2019 general allocation money, $50,000 in 2020 general allocation money, and $100,000 in targeted allocation money from FC Cincinnati in exchange for the number 24 allocation ranking and defender Nick Hagglund.
4. On April 11, 2019, LA Galaxy acquired the number 2 allocation ranking from Orlando City in exchange for the number 11 allocation ranking, $300,000 in 2019 targeted allocation money, and $100,000 in 2020 targeted allocation money.
5. On April 11, 2019, LA Galaxy acquired the number 1 allocation ranking from Toronto FC in exchange for the number 2 allocation ranking and a natural first-round selection in the 2020 MLS SuperDraft.
6. On August 7, 2019, D.C. United acquired the number 1 allocation ranking from Colorado Rapids in exchange for the number 11 allocation ranking, $100,000 in 2019 general allocation money, and $100,000 in 2020 general allocation money.
7. On August 7, 2019, Montreal Impact acquired the number 1 allocation ranking and defender Jorge Corrales from Chicago Fire in exchange for the number 6 allocation ranking, midfielder Michael Azira, and a second-round selection in the 2020 MLS SuperDraft.
