= Julian Gressel =

German-American soccer player (born 1993)

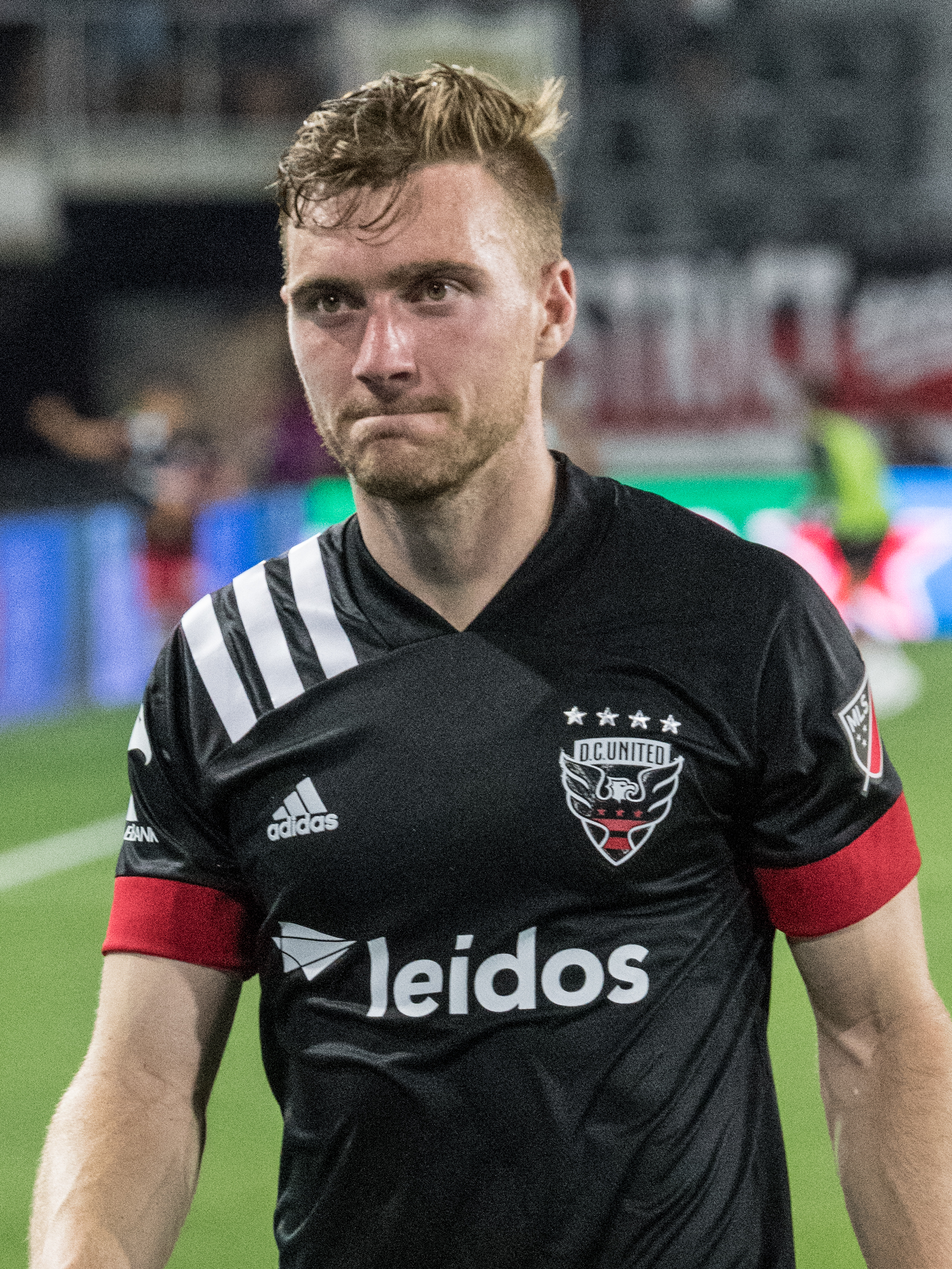
- Gressel with D.C. United in 2021

Personal information
- Full name: Julian Emil Kurt Gressel
- Date of birth: December 16, 1993 (age 32)
- Place of birth: Neustadt, Germany
- Height: 1.85 m (6 ft 1 in)
- Positions: Full-back; midfielder; winger

Team information
- Current team: Minnesota United FC
- Number: 24

Youth career
- 2002–2009: Greuther Fürth
- 2009–2011: Quelle Fürth
- 2011–2013: FC Florida

College career
Years	Team	Apps	(Gls)
2013–2016	Providence Friars	83	(30)

Senior career*
Years	Team	Apps	(Gls)
2011–2012	TSV Neustadt/Aisch	25	(3)
2012–2013	Eintracht Bamberg	32	(1)
2017–2019	Atlanta United FC	98	(15)
2020–2022	D.C. United	71	(4)
2022–2023	Vancouver Whitecaps FC	31	(5)
2023	Columbus Crew	11	(1)
2024–2025	Inter Miami CF	32	(1)
2025–	Minnesota United FC	25	(1)
2026	Minnesota United FC 2	1	(0)

International career
2023	United States	6	(0)
- * Club domestic league appearances and goals as of September 5, 2026

Julian Emil Kurt Gressel (born December 16, 1993) is a professional soccer player who plays as a full-back for Major League Soccer club Minnesota United FC. Born in Germany, he represented the United States national team.

He began his career in Germany before moving to the United States in 2011. He then played college soccer for the Providence Friars for four seasons. In 2017, Gressel signed a contract with Major League Soccer and was selected in the MLS SuperDraft in the first round with the eighth overall pick by expansion side Atlanta United.

After his debut season with Atlanta, Gressel was named the MLS Rookie of the Year for 2017. He then won his first championship, helping Atlanta United win MLS Cup in 2018. He also was part of Atlanta United sides that won the U.S. Open Cup and Campeones Cup in 2018 and 2019 respectively. Prior to the 2020 season, Gressel was traded to D.C. United.

He is a co-host of the PLAYER/MANAGER podcast with American YouTuber and streamer Zealand Shannon.

== Club career ==
=== Youth ===
Gressel was born in Neustadt. He began his footballing career by playing in the youth academy systems of 2. Bundesliga side, SpVgg Greuther Fürth in 2002. In 2009, Gressel left Greuther Fürth and began playing for the academy set-up of Quelle Fürth.

Gressel played senior-level football in the German regional fifth-tier, the Bayernliga. During the 2011–12 Bayernliga, Gressel had one goal and ten assists. The following season, Gressel played for TSV Neustadt/Aisch in the sixth tier, Landesliga Bayern-Nordwest, where Gressel notched three goals and 12 assists during the 2012–13 Landesliga Bayern-Nordwest campaign.

=== Collegiate ===
Gressel signed a National Letter of Intent before the 2013 NCAA Division I men's soccer season to play for Providence College's men's soccer program. During the 2013 season, Gressel was an immediate starter, starting and playing in all 22 fixtures the Friars played in. Gressel scored on his collegiate debut on August 30, 2013, in a 3–2 victory over Quinnipiac. In his freshman season, the Friars reached the championship match of the 2013 Big East Men's Soccer Tournament, before losing 3–2 against Marquette. The Friars ultimately earned an at-large bid into the 2013 NCAA Division I Men's Soccer Championship, where they reached the second round before losing to the fifth-seeded, Maryland. Gressel finished his freshman year with five goals and four assists. He was also awarded with a spot on the 2013 All-Big East Conference Second Team, and on the All-Rookie Team.

During his sophomore and junior seasons, Gressel earned honors on the Big East Conference All-Tournament teams for both the 2014 and 2015 editions of the tournaments. Additionally, during his junior season, Gressell earned spots on the NSCAA Third Team All-Great Lakes Region and the Second Team All-Big East Conference.

Gressel had a breakout season during his senior year at Providence. He led the Friars in total points with 36, accumulating 15 goals and six assists his senior year. Gressel was also rewarded with the Golden Boot award for scoring the most goals during the 2016 NCAA Division I Men's Soccer Championship, during a quarterfinal run which saw Providence beat CAA Champions Delaware, upset top-seeded and Big Ten Champions Maryland, and defeat Big East rivals Creighton. In addition, Gressell was listed an NSCAA First Team All-American and a semifinalist for the Hermann Trophy. Gressel additionally earned All-Great Lakes First Team honors, All-Big East Conference First Team honors, part of the 2016 Big East Men's Soccer Tournament's first team, and the All-Tournament team for the Rhode Island Capital City Classic.

=== Professional ===
==== Atlanta United ====
Ahead of the 2017 MLS SuperDraft, Gressel signed a senior college contract with Major League Soccer. Per league policy the terms were not disclosed. On January 13, 2017, Gressel was selected by expansion side Atlanta United FC in the first round with the eighth overall pick. Gressel made his professional debut for Atlanta United on March 5 in a 1–2 loss against New York Red Bulls. Gressel won the 2017 MLS Rookie of the Year honors, playing mostly as a central midfielder for manager Tata Martino. In 2018, Gressel was a key player for the MLS Cup Champions, playing mostly as a right midfielder and right wingback. Gressel starting 33 matches and assisting 14 times in league play, forming a key relationship with striker Josef Martinez and becoming one of the best crossers in the league. Gressel contributed to another successful Atlanta in 2019 for new manager Frank de Boer, assisting 12 times.

==== D.C. United ====
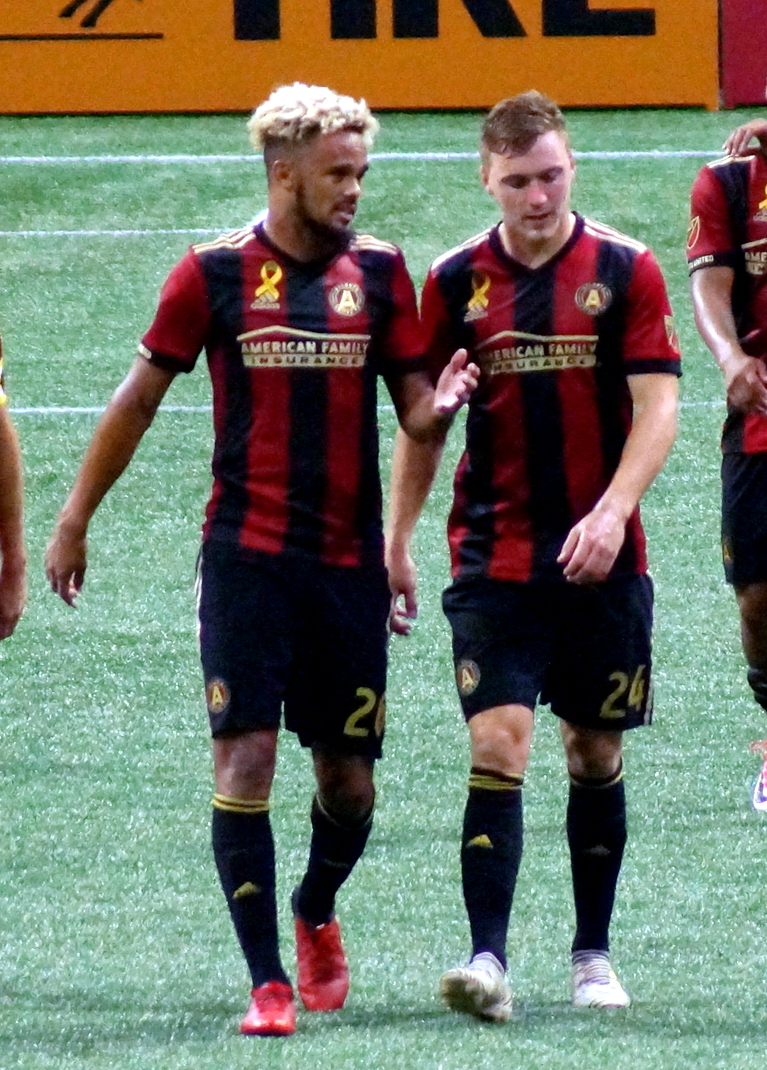
Anton Walkes and Julian Gressel, 2017

On January 21, 2020, D.C. United acquired Gressel from Atlanta United for $750,000 in Targeted Allocation Money. Gressel made his debut for D.C. on February 29, 2020, in the season opener against the Colorado Rapids. Gressel scored his first goal for D.C. United on August 29 in a 1–4 loss against the Philadelphia Union. Gressel finished the 2021 season with 13 assists, the third most in the league.

==== Vancouver Whitecaps ====
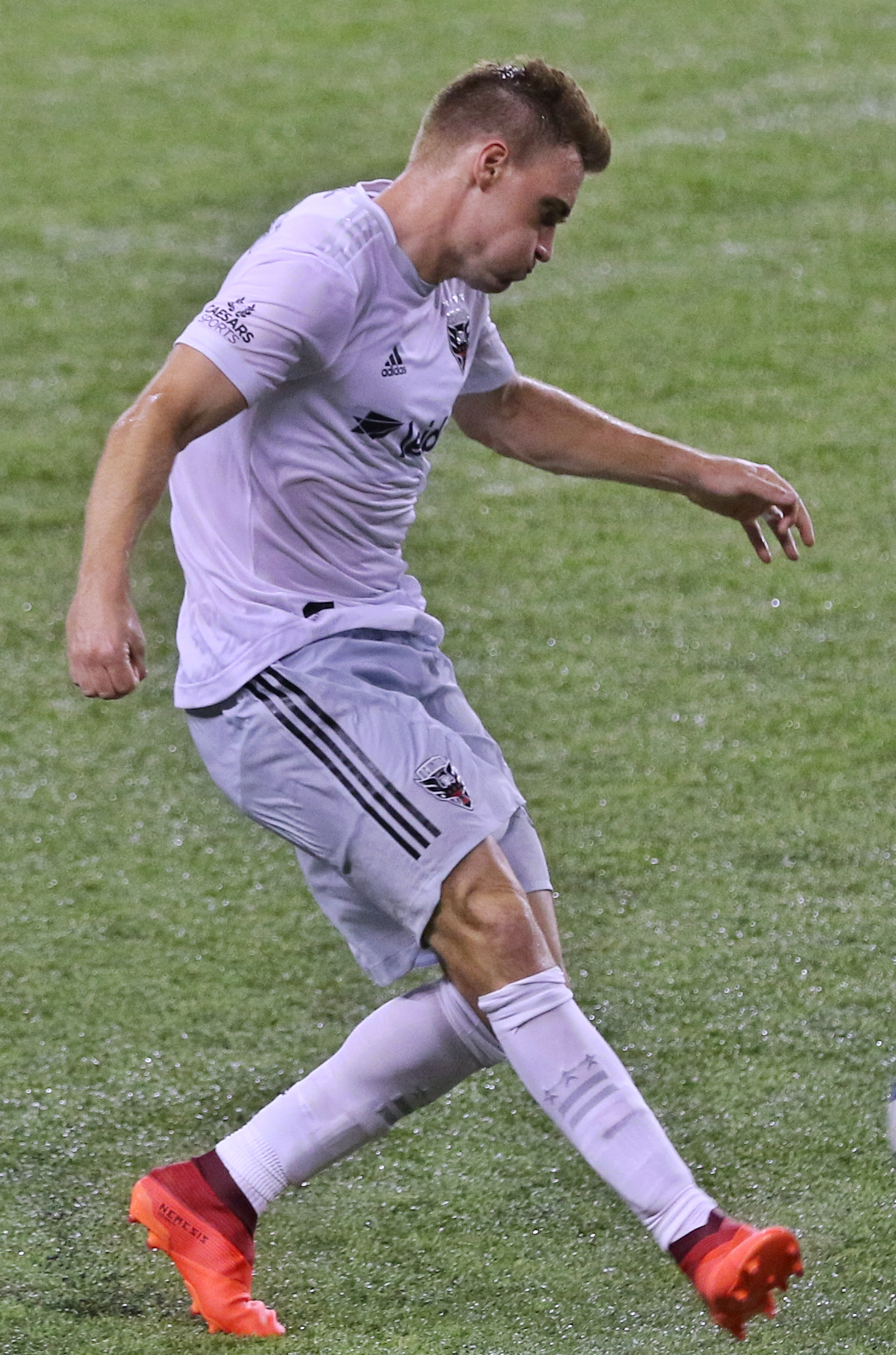
Gressel playing for D.C. United in 2020

On July 15, 2022, Gressel was traded to the Vancouver Whitecaps in exchange for up to $900,000 in General Allocation Money.

==== Columbus Crew ====
On July 21, 2023, Columbus Crew acquired Gressel from Vancouver Whitecaps FC in exchange for $550,000 of guaranteed General Allocation Money ($275,000 in 2023 and $275,000 in 2024). Vancouver could receive up to an additional $300,000 in GAM (2024–2026) based on conditional terms of the agreement.

==== Inter Miami ====
On January 9, 2024, Inter Miami announced that they had signed Gressel as a free agent on a three-year deal with an option for a further year. Gressel made his 2024 Inter Miami season debut in a match against Real Salt Lake on February 25, 2024, ending in a 2–0 win.

==== Minnesota United ====
On April 29, 2025, Minnesota United announced that they had claimed Gressel off of waivers from Inter Miami. He made his debut for Minnesota United getting subbed in a 3–0 win against Austin FC.

== International career ==
On November 5, 2022, Gressel became a United States citizen. Gressel was called in to the United States Men's National Team in January 2023 by interim manager Anthony Hudson. Gressel started at right back on January 25 against Serbia, assisting former teammate Brandon Vazquez in a 1–2 loss. Gressel was included on the 2023 CONCACAF Gold Cup roster for the United States. He made his Gold Cup debut off the bench against St. Kitts and Nevis, before assisting Gianluca Busio as a substitute against Trinidad and Tobago in the final group stage match. Gressel then started his first ever competitive match in the Gold Cup quarterfinal versus Canada, playing 90 minutes at right-wing as the US ran out as eventual winners on penalties to reach the semi-finals.

== Career statistics ==
=== Club ===
As of match played September 5, 2026

Appearances and goals by club, season and competition
Club	Season	League			National cup (Note: Includes U.S. Open Cup and Canadian Championship)		Continental		Other		Total	
Club	Season	Division	Apps	Goals	Apps	Goals	Apps	Goals	Apps	Goals	Apps	Goals
Eintracht Bamberg	2012–13	Regionalliga Bayern	32	1	—		—		—		32	1
Atlanta United FC	2017	MLS	32	5	2	1	—		1 (Note: Appearance(s) in MLS Cup playoffs)	0	35	6
Atlanta United FC	2018	MLS	33	4	2	0	—		5	0	40	4
Atlanta United FC	2019	MLS	33	6	3	0	4 (Note: Three appearances in CONCACAF Champions League, one appearance in Campeones Cup)	0	3	2	43	8
Atlanta United FC	Total		98	15	7	1	4	0	9	2	118	18
D.C. United	2020	MLS	22	2	—		—		—		22	2
D.C. United	2021	MLS	34	2	—		—		—		34	2
D.C. United	2022	MLS	17	0	—		—		—		17	0
D.C. United	Total		73	4	—		—		—		73	4
Vancouver Whitecaps FC	2022	MLS	13	2	1	0	—		—		14	2
Vancouver Whitecaps FC	2023	MLS	18	3	3	2	3	0	—		24	5
Vancouver Whitecaps FC	Total		31	5	4	2	3	0	—		38	7
Columbus Crew	2023	MLS	11	1	—		—		6 (Note: Two appearances in Leagues Cup, four appearances in MLS Cup playoffs)	0	17	1
Inter Miami CF	2024	MLS	32	1	—		4 (Note: Appearances in CONCACAF Champions Cup)	0	4 (Note: Appearances in Leagues Cup)	0	40	1
Inter Miami CF	2025	MLS	0	0	—		—		—		0	0
Inter Miami CF	Total		32	1	—		4	0	4	0	40	1
Minnesota United FC	2025	MLS	21	1	4	0	—		5 (Note: Three appearances in Leagues Cup, two appearances in MLS Cup playoffs)	0	30	1
Minnesota United FC	2026	MLS	4	0	0	0	—		1 (Note: Appearance in Leagues Cup)	0	5	0
Minnesota United FC	Total		25	1	4	0	—		6	0	35	1
Minnesota United FC 2	2026	MLS Next Pro	1	0	—		—		—		1	0
Career total			303	28	15	3	11	0	25	2	354	33

=== International ===
As of match played July 12, 2023

Appearances and goals by national team and year
National team	Year	Apps	Goals
United States	2023	6	0
Total		6	0

== Honors ==
Atlanta United

- MLS Cup: 2018
- U.S. Open Cup: 2019
- Campeones Cup: 2019

Vancouver Whitecaps

- Canadian Championship: 2022, 2023

Columbus Crew

- MLS Cup: 2023

Inter Miami

- Supporters' Shield: 2024

Individual

- MLS Rookie of the Year: 2017
- George Gross Memorial Trophy: 2023
