= 2014 D.C. United season =

D.C. United
2014 season
- General manager: Dave Kasper
- Head coach: Ben Olsen
- Stadium: RFK Stadium
- MLS: Eastern Conference: 1st Overall: 3rd
- MLS Cup Playoffs: Conference semifinals
- U.S. Open Cup: Fourth round
- CONCACAF Champions League: Quarterfinals
- Atlantic Cup: Winners
- Carolina Challenge Cup: Winners
- Highest home attendance: 53,267 vs. Columbus
- Lowest home attendance: 1,904 vs. Tauro
- Average home league attendance: Regular season: 17,030; Playoffs:—
Home colors	Away colors

The 2014 D.C. United season was the club's nineteenth season of existence, and their nineteenth in Major League Soccer, the top tier of the American soccer pyramid.

Outside of MLS regular season play, the club is going to be participating in the 2014 U.S. Open Cup, in which they are the defending champions, as well as the 2014–15 CONCACAF Champions League. It is United's first appearance in the Champions League since the 2009–10 campaign. Ahead of the MLS regular season campaign, United will participate in the 2014 Carolina Challenge Cup.

== Background ==
=== Pre-season ===
After an abysmal 2013 campaign that saw the team break several negative MLS records, the team swapped out over half of its roster. Several starters from 2013 were released or simply let go, including starters like Lionard Pajoy, Dwayne De Rosario, and James Riley among others. In their place, the team gathered several players from other teams, including Davy Arnaud from Montreal, Bobby Boswell from Houston, and Eddie Johnson from Seattle.

Ben Olsen and Dave Kasper were allowed to stay on as Head Coach and General Manager (respectively) of the team.

By the time the first match of the MLS season came around, only 4 of the starting 11 had stayed with the team from last year. Prospective starting midfielder Chris Pontius suffered a serious hamstring injury and was pronounced out for most of the season. His spot was given to fellow midfielder Perry Kitchen.

=== March ===
The season started on a bad note, with a relatively new Columbus Crew beating a disorganized D.C. United side at home 3–0, and then a 1–0 loss to a surprisingly hot Toronto FC side. However, the team began showing signs of life in a home game against the Chicago Fire. Though the game ended in a 2–2 draw, the newly signed Fabian Espindola and the promoted Kitchen helped to give D.C. United a 2–1 lead in the second half, something the team had not had in MLS season play in a while.

=== April ===
D.C. United went on a roll, adding a 3–0–1 tally throughout the month. Former Chicago Fire midfielder Chris Rolfe, signed to shore up the midfield in the absence of Pontius, made an immediate impact in his first game with the team. In a game against the New England Revolution, he scored a brace in the closing seconds of stoppage time, contributing to the team's 2–0 victory. DC then tacked on another victory against the New York Red Bulls, as the team's defense–--combined with some lucky breaks---managed to hold on to a one-goal lead for most of the match.

DC almost won a third straight match at Columbus in a rematch against the Crew, but for a mistake by Espindola which led to a goal by Crew forward Hector Jiménez that allowed them to tie the match near the end of the second half. DC ended up settling for a draw. Back at home, DC would get a crushing victory after an early red card on an FC Dallas player allowed the team, led by Espindola, to rack up a 4–1 victory.

=== May ===
Poor marking on defense and an anemic offense allowed the struggling Portland Timbers to sneak away with a 3–2 victory in the dying seconds of the match. It was a familiar tune that would repeat itself over the next few games as D.C. United barely held on to a 1–0 victory in Philadelphia, and managed to salvage a 1–1 draw against the cellar-dwelling Montreal Impact thanks to DC forward Eddie Johnson scoring his first goal on the season. The team did much better in their following match against Houston, getting a 2–0 victory at home. Then they fell apart in the second half of a match against the Revolution in Foxboro, losing both the game 2–1 and Johnson to a red card suspension.

Back home against Sporting KC, the team held on to an Espindola goal to win the match 1–0, but starting defender Jeff Parke left the game due to a foot injury. He would be replaced by rookie defender Steve Birnbaum.

=== June ===
After a friendly between Spain and El Salvador, D.C. United played the second half of a doubleheader of soccer action in FedExField in Landover, against the Columbus Crew. The game ended in a 0–0 draw, with Espindola chipping a penalty kick right into the opposing goalkeeper's hands in the final minutes of play. A few days later, the team travelled to Montreal and beat the Impact 4–2, with Luis Silva earning his first-ever hat trick for the team. Espindola suffered an MCL sprain during this match, and would be sidelined for at least 8 weeks.

Following this game, the entire league took two weeks off for the 2014 FIFA World Cup, as many of its star players were busy playing for their respective national teams in the Cup. During this break, D.C. United played a match in the fourth round of the 2014 U.S. Open Cup against the Rochester Rhinos, but unlike last year, Ben Olsen downplayed the significance of the tournament and fielded a team of mostly reserve players. The team was eliminated in a quiet 1–0 defeat, the only highlight of the match for DC was Birnbaum being sent off in the 60th minute.

On the 28th, D.C. United resumed league play against the Seattle Sounders, where they lost 1–0 at home.

=== July ===
At the start of the month, Christian mutually terminated his contract with the team, claiming that he did not feel comfortable playing in Washington and wished to go back to Spain. His spot on the starting lineup was taken by Chris Korb.

Four days later, DC travelled to Toronto and won 2–1, thanks to a pair of stylish goals from midfielders Perry Kitchen and Nick DeLeon. Afterwards, the team travelled to San Jose to face the Earthquakes, and managed to win 2–1 thanks to a combination of a successful Eddie Johnson penalty kick and Bill Hamid making miraculous saves in the dying minutes of the match. The team travelled back home to Washington to face the surging Chivas USA, and defeated them 3–1. Johnson scored his third goal of the season (and second from a penalty kick) in that match. During this time, Parke recovered from his foot injury, but immediately suffered painful migraine headaches that kept him on the sidelines.

On the 26th, the team travelled to Jacksonville to play a friendly against Fulham F.C., as an opening act for the newly expanded EverBank Field. While fielding a team of reserves, DC lost 3–0 as Moussa Dembélé scored a hat trick on the team and DC goalkeeper Andrew Dykstra tore his Achilles tendon, ending his season prematurely. Kyle Porter and Alex Caskey also left the game with injuries.

A few days later, DC acquired Kofi Opare from the LA Galaxy in a trade and defeated Toronto 3–0 at home.

=== August ===
D.C. United began August with a pair of road losses, but the team recovered to post some strong results and finished the month on top of the Eastern Conference standings. With Chris Korb out, Taylor Kemp made his first start at left back. Despite an early yellow card on Kemp, D.C. United seemed poised to take a rare point in Houston, when Will Bruin beat Kemp and Birnbaum to get on the end of a long pass in added time and scored the lone goal in a 1–0 win for the Dynamo. D.C. United next traveled to Utah to play Real Salt Lake. Although Espindola returned to action in the second half after a prolonged injury absence, RSL scored 3 times in the first half to hand DC its second straight loss. Eddie Johnson received a red card and so would miss the next MLS match.

A Sunday night match at RFK saw D.C. United break out of a scoring slump, with 4 goals against the Colorado Rapids. Luis Silva scored twice, including one off Kemp's first MLS assist. Rolfe and Espindola had the other goals. Three nights later, a lineup that featured Eddie Johnson and 10 D.C. United reserves opened up the team's group play in the 2014-15 CONCACAF Champions League with a 1–0 home win against Jamaican side Waterhouse FC on an early goal by Johnson.

United went on the road for a game 3 nights later against division-leading Sporting Kansas City. With first-half goals by Espindola, Rolfe and Kitchen, DC surprised SKC by a 3–0 score to take over the top spot in the MLS Eastern Conference. Coach Ben Olsen rested several starters on a road match in Los Angeles, and the team suffered a hard loss, losing 4–1 to the LA Galaxy. 4 days later, D.C. United rebounded at home, riding goals by Silva and Espindola to a 2–0 win over New York Red Bulls, leaving D.C. United 4 points clear in the Eastern Conference race.

=== September ===
Before heading out on the road for a match against Vancouver Whitecaps FC, D.C. United added a Ghana international, Samuel Inkoom. Once again, DC started the month slowly, with a draw in Vancouver, followed four days later by a heartbreaking road loss to New York Red Bulls. United lost Chris Rolfe to a broken arm injury suffered in practice prior to the game against NYRB. Despite playing a man down for most of the match after Espindola was red-carded, United seemed destined to hold on for a draw until Lloyd Sam's stoppage-time goal won the night for the Red Bulls. The game marked the first MLS action of the season for Pontius, who came on as a second-half substitute.

With Espindola forced to miss the next MLS match, Olsen started Espindola in the return match against Waterhouse FC in Jamaica in CONCACAF group play. Espindola had both D.C. United goals in a 2–1 win for the MLS team.

Next, D.C. United traveled to Chicago to play the Chicago Fire, and the DC team rallied from a 2–0 deficit to get a point in a 3–3 draw. DC went ahead 3–2 on a pair of goals by Silva and a goal by Boswell before the team once again lost points on a late goal by the Fire.

The team returned to RFK for another CONCACAF Champions League match, this time facing struggling Panamanian side Tauro FC. With goals by Johnson and Pontius, and an assist by Inkoom, D.C. United earned a 2–0 win over Tauro, and clinched the top spot in the group and a place in the quarterfinals.

When the team resumed MLS action four days after the Tauro match, DC fans turned out in big numbers, with the biggest home crowd in nearly two years. 19,478 fans watched D.C. United defeat the Philadelphia Union on a header for a goal by Silva. The assist went to Korb, who was playing in his first MLS match since injuring his hamstring on August 9.

=== October ===
Pontius made his first MLS start of the year for a home match against Sporting Kansas City. The goalless draw was enough for D.C. United to clinch a playoff berth. The good news kept coming for D.C. United, as the team next won for the first time ever in Houston, defeating the Dynamo 3–1 on goals by Kemp, Espindola and Johnson. The one sour note for DC was a hamstring injury suffered by Silva after play had resumed following a lengthy rain delay.

On October 18, D.C. United completed its worst-to-first turnaround. A 2–1 home win before a sellout crowd at RFK clinched first place and the top seed in the Eastern Conference playoffs. Pontius scored his first league goal in over a year, and Johnson capped off the scoring for D.C. United.

Three days later, a team of reserves traveled to Panama. A fluke goal on a ball that ricocheted off Conor Shanosky's head was enough for a 1–0 D.C. United win. This win meant that D.C. United earned the full 12 points, the only team in group play to do so. As a result, United gained the top seed heading into the quarterfinal round of CONCACAF Champions League play in February 2015.

The final match of the regular season took United across the northern border, where the team fell behind to the Montreal Impact on a goal by Marco Di Vaio in his final game. A late goal by Espindola got a point for D.C. United, closing out the regular season as the first place team in the Eastern Conference and in third-place overall in the MLS Supporters Shield race. United completed the largest turnaround in points from one MLS season to the next.

=== November ===
An injury-depleted D.C. United squad traveled to Red Bull Arena for a playoff match against New York Red Bulls. United fell 2–0 on goals by Bradley Wright-Phillips and Peguy Luyindola. Needing at least two goals in the return match at RFK, D.C. United got a first half goal from Nick DeLeon to set the stage for an improbable comeback. However, another goal by Luyindula, on an assist by Thierry Henry, sealed D.C. United's fate. A late goal by Sean Franklin was not nearly enough to send the home-and-home series to overtime, as NYRB defeated D.C. United by an aggregate 3–2 score.

=== December ===
Awards season saw D.C. United get several honors. Bobby Boswell was named MLS Defender of the Year. Bill Hamid was MLS Goalie of the Year and Ben Olsen was named MLS Coach of the Year.

In roster moves, D.C. United added Thomas McNamara in the dispersal draft that allocated players from disbanded Chivas USA. However, McNamara was selected by New York City in the subsequent MLS expansion draft. Orlando City SC also took a D.C. United player, Lewis Neal. Prior to the expansion draft, D.C. United traded Joe Willis and Inkoom to Houston in exchange for Andrew Driver, a move that allowed the team to protect an additional domestic player in the expansion draft.

== Squad ==
As of October 2, 2014.

No.	Position	Nation	Player
2	DF	USA	Jeff Parke
3	MF	USA	David Estrada
4	DF	CAN	Nana Attakora
5	DF	USA	Sean Franklin
6	DF	USA	Kofi Opare
7	FW	USA	Eddie Johnson (DP)
8	MF	USA	Davy Arnaud
9	FW	ARG	Fabián Espíndola
11	MF	USA	Luis Silva
12	MF	USA	Alex Caskey
13	FW	USA	Chris Pontius
14	MF	USA	Nick DeLeon
15	DF	USA	Steve Birnbaum
17	MF	USA	Conor Shanosky (HGP)
18	FW	USA	Chris Rolfe
19	MF	CAN	Kyle Porter
20	DF	USA	Jalen Robinson (HGP)
21	DF	GHA	Samuel Inkoom
22	DF	USA	Chris Korb
23	MF	USA	Perry Kitchen
24	MF	ENG	Lewis Neal
25	MF	USA	Jared Jeffrey
27	MF	USA	Collin Martin (HGP)
28	GK	USA	Bill Hamid (HGP)
29	FW	JAM	Michael Seaton (HGP)
30	FW	USA	Conor Doyle
31	GK	USA	Joe Willis
32	DF	USA	Bobby Boswell
33	DF	USA	Taylor Kemp
50	GK	USA	Andrew Dykstra

== Competitions ==
=== Preseason ===
==== Florida training camp ====
February 5	D.C. United	0–1	Toronto FC	Bradenton, Florida
19:00 UTC-5		Report	Dike 85'	Stadium: IMG Academy

February 8	D.C. United	0–2	Chicago Fire	Bradenton, Florida
19:00 UTC-5	Arnaud (yellow card) 39'; Doyle (yellow card) 86'	Report	Shipp 48'; Ward 80'	Stadium: IMG Academy

February 12	D.C. United	0–1	Chicago Fire	Bradenton, Florida
10:00 UTC-5			Joya 75'; Ward (yellow card) 85'	Stadium: IMG Academy; Attendance: 247

==== Carolina Challenge Cup ====
February 22 1	Houston Dynamo	0–2	D.C. United	Charleston, South Carolina
17:00 EDT			Horst 21' (o.g.); Seaton 88'	Stadium: Blackbaud Stadium; Attendance: 2,331

February 26 2	Charleston Battery	1–1	D.C. United	Charleston, South Carolina
19:30 EDT	Ruggles 90+'		Silva 72'	Stadium: Blackbaud Stadium; Attendance: 3,066

March 1 3	D.C. United	2–2	Seattle Sounders FC	Charleston, South Carolina
17:00 EDT	Espíndola 8' (pen.); Kitchen 53'	Report	Cooper 24'; Pappa 63'	Stadium: Blackbaud Stadium; Attendance: 2,457

=== Major League Soccer ===
==== Overall table ====
Pos	Team	Pld	W	L	T	GF	GA	GD	Pts	Qualification
1	Seattle Sounders FC (S, U)	34	20	10	4	65	50	+15	64	Qualification for the CONCACAF Champions League
2	LA Galaxy (C)	34	17	7	10	69	37	+32	61	Qualification for the CONCACAF Champions League
3	D.C. United	34	17	9	8	52	37	+15	59	Qualification for the CONCACAF Champions League
4	Real Salt Lake	34	15	8	11	54	39	+15	56	Qualification for the CONCACAF Champions League
5	New England Revolution	34	17	13	4	51	46	+5	55	
6	FC Dallas	34	16	12	6	55	45	+10	54	
7	Columbus Crew	34	14	10	10	52	42	+10	52	
8	New York Red Bulls	34	13	10	11	55	50	+5	50	
9	Vancouver Whitecaps FC	34	12	8	14	42	40	+2	50	Qualification for the CONCACAF Champions League
10	Sporting Kansas City	34	14	13	7	48	41	+7	49	
11	Portland Timbers	34	12	9	13	61	52	+9	49	
12	Philadelphia Union	34	10	12	12	51	51	0	42	
13	Toronto FC	34	11	15	8	44	54	−10	41	
14	Houston Dynamo	34	11	17	6	39	58	−19	39	
15	Chicago Fire	34	6	10	18	41	51	−10	36	
16	Chivas USA	34	9	19	6	29	61	−32	33	
17	Colorado Rapids	34	8	18	8	43	62	−19	32	
18	San Jose Earthquakes	34	6	16	12	35	50	−15	30	
19	Montreal Impact (V)	34	6	18	10	38	58	−20	28	

Source: MLS
Rules for classification: 1) points; 2) head-to-head record; 3) goal difference; 4) number of goals scored
(C) MLS Cup champions; (S) Supporters' Shield winners; (U) U.S. Open Cup winners; (V) Canadian Championship winners

==== Eastern Conference standings ====
Pos	Team	Pld	W	L	T	GF	GA	GD	Pts	Qualification
1	D.C. United	34	17	9	8	52	37	+15	59	Qualification for the conference semifinals
2	New England Revolution	34	17	13	4	51	37	+14	55	Qualification for the conference semifinals
3	Columbus Crew SC	34	14	10	10	52	42	+10	52	Qualification for the conference semifinals
4	New York Red Bulls	34	13	10	11	55	50	+5	50	Qualification for the knockout round
5	Sporting Kansas City	34	14	13	7	48	41	+7	49	Qualification for the knockout round
6	Philadelphia Union	34	10	12	12	51	51	0	42	
7	Toronto FC	34	11	15	8	44	54	−10	41	
8	Houston Dynamo	34	11	17	6	39	58	−19	39	
9	Chicago Fire	34	6	10	18	41	51	−10	36	
10	Montreal Impact	34	6	18	10	38	58	−20	28	

Source: MLS

==== Results summary ====
Overall								Home						Away					
Pld	W	D	L	GF	GA	GD	Pts	W	D	L	GF	GA	GD	W	D	L	GF	GA	GD
34	17	8	9	52	37	+15	59	11	4	2	28	12	+16	6	4	7	24	25	−1

Last updated: October 30, 2014.
Source: Match results

==== Results by round ====
Round	1	2	3	4	5	6	7	8	9	10	11	12	13	14	15	16	17	18	19	20	21	22	23	24	25	26	27	28	29	30	31	32	33	34
Stadium	H	A	H	H	H	A	H	A	A	H	H	A	H	H	A	H	A	A	H	H	A	A	H	A	A	H	A	A	A	H	H	A	H	A
Result	L	L	D	W	W	D	W	L	W	D	W	L	W	D	W	L	W	W	W	W	L	L	W	W	L	W	D	L	D	W	D	W	W	D

Updated to match(es) played on October 30, 2014. Source: MLS Results and League table
A = Away; H = Home; W = Win; D = Draw; L = Loss

==== Match results ====
March 8 1	D.C. United	0–3	Columbus Crew	Washington, D.C.
19:00 EST	Neal (yellow card) 67'	Report	Arrieta 18'; Higuaín 27' (pen.), 90' (yellow card) 63'; Tchani (yellow card) 39'; Trapp (yellow card) 43'; Francis (yellow card) 76'	Stadium: RFK Stadium; Attendance: 13,840; Referee: Andres Pfefferkorn

March 22 2	Toronto FC	1–0	D.C. United	Toronto, Ontario
16:30 EDT	Jackson (yellow card) 50'; Defoe 60'	Report	Arnaud (yellow card) 55'	Stadium: BMO Field; Attendance: 22,591; Referee: Silviu Petrescu

March 29 3	D.C. United	2–2	Chicago Fire	Washington, D.C.
16:00 EDT	DeLeon (yellow card) 22'; Espíndola 35'; Parke (yellow card) 56'; Kitchen 73'	Report	Hurtado 27'; Cochrane (yellow card) 58'; Amarikwa 83'	Stadium: RFK Stadium; Attendance: 9,445; Referee: Jair Marrufo

April 5 4	D.C. United	2–0	New England Revolution	Washington, D.C.
19:00 EDT	Neal (yellow card) 4'; Gonçalves 43' (o.g.); Doyle (yellow card) 90+2'; Rolfe 90+3'	Report	Dorman (yellow card) 36'; Davies (yellow card) 88'	Stadium: RFK Stadium; Attendance: 10,526; Referee: Jorge Gonzalez

April 12 5	D.C. United	1–0	New York Red Bulls	Washington, D.C.
19:00 EDT	Arnaud 4'; Christian (yellow card) 16'; Kitchen (yellow card) 71'; Jeffrey (yellow card) 90'	Report	Alexander (yellow card) 14'; Miller (yellow card) 30'	Stadium: RFK Stadium; Attendance: 12,364; Referee: Allen Chapman

April 19 6	Columbus Crew	1–1	D.C. United	Columbus, Ohio
19:30 EDT	Oduro (yellow card) 18'; González (yellow card) 73'; Anõr (red card) 81'; Jiménez 89'	Report	Espíndola 31'; Kitchen (yellow card) 67'	Stadium: Crew Stadium; Attendance: 11,437

April 26 7	D.C. United	4–1	FC Dallas	Washington, D.C.
19:00 EDT	Espíndola 45+5', 69'; Boswell 60'; Franklin 64'	Report	Loyd (yellow card) 10' (yellow-red card) 39'; Díaz 13'; Seitz (yellow card) 48'; Hedges (yellow card) 74'; Michel (red card) 89'	Stadium: RFK Stadium; Attendance: 11,172; Referee: Fotis Bazakos

May 3 8	Portland Timbers	3–2	D.C. United	Portland, Oregon
22:30 EDT	Fernández 1'; Danso 38'; Urruti 90+4'		Arnaud 21'; Danso 78' (o.g.); Espíndola (yellow card) 86'	Stadium: Providence Park; Attendance: 20,814

May 10 9	Philadelphia Union	0–1	D.C. United	Chester, Pennsylvania
16:30 EDT			Rolfe 6'; Kitchen (yellow card) 33'; Korb (yellow card) 67'; Arnaud (yellow card) 78'	Stadium: PPL Park; Attendance: 18,522

May 17 10	D.C. United	1–1	Montreal Impact	Washington, D.C.
19:00 EDT	DeLeon (yellow card) 77'; Johnson 84'; Neal (yellow card) 85'		McInerney 56'; Bernardello (yellow card) 67'; Bernier (yellow card) 90+2'	Stadium: RFK Stadium; Attendance: 14,106

May 21 11	D.C. United	2–0	Houston Dynamo	Washington, D.C.
19:00 EDT	Rolfe 28'; Arnaud (yellow card) 36'; Neal (yellow card) 56'; Espíndola 63' (yellow card) 72'		Barnes (yellow card) 65'; Ownby (red card) 90+2'	Stadium: RFK Stadium; Attendance: 8,224; Referee: Alan Kelly

May 24 12	New England Revolution	2–1	D.C. United	Foxborough, Massachusetts
19:30 EDT	Mullins 55'; Bunbury (yellow card) 64'; Fagúndez (yellow card) 67' (goal) 77'	Report	Korb (yellow card) 39'; Kitchen (yellow card) 42'; Arnaud (yellow card) 67'; Espíndola 73'; Johnson (red card) 82'	Stadium: Gillette Stadium; Attendance: 13,589

May 31 13	D.C. United	1–0	Sporting Kansas City	Washington, D.C.
19:00 EDT	Espíndola 28' (yellow card) 76'; Christian (yellow card) 62'; Kitchen (yellow card) 82'; Caskey (red card) 90+4'	Report	Palmer-Brown (yellow card) 72'; Toni (yellow card) 85'	Stadium: RFK Stadium; Attendance: 18,522

June 7 14	D.C. United	0–0	Columbus Crew	Landover, Maryland
19:00 EDT	Boswell (yellow card) 42'; Christian (yellow card) 78'	Report	Meram (yellow card) 88'; Anor (yellow card) 90+4'	Stadium: FedExField; Attendance: 53,267; Referee: Hilario Grajeda
Note: Doubleheader following Spain–El Salvador friendly match

June 11 15	Montreal Impact	2–4	D.C. United	Montreal, Quebec
19.30 EDT	McInerney 12'; Romero 21' (yellow card) 25'; Lefevre (yellow card) 81'	Report	Silva 6', 39', 45+5' (pen.); DeLeon 23'; Arnaud (yellow card) 87'	Stadium: Stade Saputo; Attendance: 14,135; Referee: Mark Kadlecik

June 28 16	D.C. United	0–1	Seattle Sounders FC	Washington, D.C.
19:00 EDT		Report	Alonso (yellow card) 20'; Barrett 39'; Pineda (yellow card) 87'	Stadium: RFK Stadium; Attendance: 16,922; Referee: (Canada) Silviu Petrescu

July 5 17	Toronto FC	1–2	D.C. United	Toronto, Ontario
19:00 EDT	Moore 60'; Hagglund (red card) 88'	Report	DeLeon 54'; Kitchen 69'	Stadium: BMO Field; Attendance: 22,591; Referee: David Gantar

July 11 18	San Jose Earthquakes	1–2	D.C. United	Santa Clara, California
23:00 EDT	Wondolowski 39'; Gordon (yellow card) 90+2'	Report	Johnson 12' (pen.) (yellow card) 87'; Silva 25'; Kitchen (yellow card) 71'	Stadium: Buck Shaw Stadium; Attendance: 10,525; Referee: Jair Marrufo

July 20 19	D.C. United	3–1	Chivas USA	Washington, D.C.
20:00 EDT	Johnson 25' (pen.); Kitchen (yellow card) 31' (goal) 59'; Silva 70' (yellow card) 71'	Report	Torres 84' (pen.)	Stadium: RFK Stadium; Attendance: 13,732; Referee: Fotis Bazakos

July 30 20	D.C. United	3–0	Toronto FC	Washington, D.C.
19:00 EDT	Johnson 8' (yellow card) 90'; Arnaud (yellow card) 42'; Korb (yellow card) 54'; Rolfe 59'; Hagglund 67' (o.g.)	Report	Warner (yellow card) 36'; Bradley (yellow card) 68'	Stadium: RFK Stadium; Attendance: 16,171; Referee: Chris Penso

August 3 21	Houston Dynamo	1–0	D.C. United	Houston, Texas
20:00 EDT	Bruin 90+1'	Report	Kemp (yellow card) 5'; Kitchen (yellow card) 72'	Stadium: BBVA Compass Stadium; Attendance: 20,061; Referee: (United States) Edwin Jurisevic

August 9 22	Real Salt Lake	3–0	D.C. United	Sandy, Utah
22:00 EDT	Plata 11'; Schuler 13', 24'; Mansally (yellow card) 85'	Report	Jeffrey (yellow card) 5'; Johnson (yellow card) 30'	Stadium: Rio Tinto Stadium; Attendance: 20,452; Referee: Hilario Grajeda

August 17 23	D.C. United	4–2	Colorado Rapids	Washington, D.C.
20:00 EDT	Silva 12', 67'; Arnaud (yellow card) 68'; Kitchen (yellow card) 72'; Rolfe 81'; Espíndola 86'	Report	LaBrocca (yellow card) 3'; Klute (yellow card) 43'; Serna 52'; Brown 90+1'	Stadium: RFK Stadium; Attendance: 12,814; Referee: Allen Chapman

August 23 24	Sporting KC	0–3	D.C. United	Kansas City, Kansas
20:30 EDT	Julião (yellow card) 83'	Report	Espíndola 24'; Rolfe 28'; Kitchen 31'; Kemp (yellow card) 61'	Stadium: Sporting Park; Attendance: 19,963; Referee: Alan Kelly

August 27 25	LA Galaxy	4–1	D.C. United	Carson, California
22:30 EDT	Gordon 2'; Donovan (yellow card) 18' (goal) 75' (pen.); González 25'; Husidic 45+1'	Report	Silva (yellow card) 21'; Leonardo 58' (o.g.); Espíndola (yellow card) 81'	Stadium: StubHub Center; Attendance: 16,044; Referee: Kevin Stott

August 31 26	D.C. United	2–0	New York Red Bulls	Washington, D.C.
14:30 EDT	Silva 57'; Johnson 90+1'	Report		Stadium: RFK Stadium; Attendance: 19,453; Referee: Jair Marrufo

September 6 27	Vancouver Whitecaps FC	0–0	D.C. United	Vancouver, British Columbia
22:00 EDT		Report	Boswell (yellow card) 18'	Stadium: BC Place; Attendance: 18,116; Referee: Drew Fisher

September 10 28	New York Red Bulls	1–0	D.C. United	Harrison, New Jersey
20:00 EDT	Sam 90'; Miller (yellow card) 38'; Armando (yellow card) 39'	Report	Espíndola (red card) 32'	Stadium: Red Bull Arena; Attendance: 14,953; Referee: Mark Geiger

September 20 29	Chicago Fire	3–3	D.C. United	Bridgeview, Illinois
20:30 EDT	Amarikwa 16'; Larentowicz 32' (pen.); Cocis (yellow card) 45'; Watson 78'; Palmer (yellow card) 90+1'	Report	Kitchen (yellow card) 31'; Silva 39' (pen.), 54'; DeLeon (yellow card) 65'; Boswell 68'	Stadium: Toyota Park; Attendance: 17,279; Referee: Fotis Bazakos

September 27 30	D.C. United	1–0	Philadelphia Union	Washington, D.C.
15:00 EDT	Silva 10'; Kitchen (yellow card) 86'	Report	Edu (yellow card) 90'	Stadium: RFK Stadium; Attendance: 19,478; Referee: Silviu Petrescu

October 3 31	D.C. United	0–0	Sporting Kansas City	Washington, D.C.
20:00 EDT	Arnaud (yellow card) 45+1'	Report	Sinovic (yellow card) 30'; Nagamura (yellow card) 52'; Dwyer (yellow card) 55'	Stadium: RFK Stadium; Attendance: 19,308; Referee: Hilario Grajeda

October 12 32	Houston Dynamo	1–3	D.C. United	Houston, Texas
15:00 EDT	Barnes 83' (pen.)	Report	Kemp 41'; Espíndola 64'; Hamid (yellow card) 70'; Johnson 87'	Stadium: BBVA Compass Stadium; Attendance: 21,689; Referee: Ismail Elfath

October 18 33	D.C. United	2–1	Chicago Fire	Washington, D.C.
20:00 EDT	Pontius 31'; Johnson 53'	Report	Shipp 67'; Ritter (yellow card) 90+2'	Stadium: RFK Stadium; Attendance: 20,162; Referee: Armando Villarreal

October 25 34	Montreal Impact	1–1	D.C. United	Montreal, Quebec
16:00 EDT	Di Vaio 26'; Mallace (yellow card) 40'	Report	Espíndola 86'	Stadium: Saputo Stadium; Attendance: 15,242; Referee: Silviu Petrescu

=== MLS Cup Playoffs ===
==== Conference semifinals ====
November 2 First leg	New York Red Bulls	2–0	D.C. United	Harrison, New Jersey
16:00 EST	Wright-Phillips 40'; McCarty (yellow card) 43'; Luyindula 73'; Bitolo (yellow card) 82'; Miller (yellow card) 84'	Report		Stadium: Red Bull Arena; Attendance: 18,054; Referee: Hilario Grajeda

November 8 Second leg	D.C. United	2–1 (2–3 agg.)	New York Red Bulls	Washington, D.C.
14:30 EST	DeLeon 37'; Espindola (yellow card) 58' (red card) 90+6'; Kemp (yellow card) 85'; Franklin 90+1'	Report	Miller (yellow card) 42' (red card) 78'; Luyindula 57'; Wright-Phillips (yellow card) 89'	Stadium: RFK Stadium; Attendance: 20,187; Referee: Ismail Elfath

=== CONCACAF Champions League ===
==== Group stage ====
August 20 1	D.C. United (United States)	1–0	(Jamaica) Waterhouse	Washington, D.C.
20:00 EDT	Johnson 5'; Attakora (yellow card) 23'	Report; Box Score		Stadium: RFK Stadium; Attendance: 3,300; Referee: Armando Castro (Honduras)

September 16 2	Waterhouse (Jamaica)	1–2	(United States) D.C. United	Kingston
20:00 EDT	Anderson (yellow card) 41'; Gray 71'; Finlayson (yellow card) 90+1'	Report; Box Score	Espíndola 38', 50'; Kemp (yellow card) 22' (yellow-red card) 70'; Hamid (yellow card) 81'	Stadium: Independence Park; Attendance: 554; Referee: Adrian Skeete (Barbados)

September 24 3	D.C. United (United States)	2–0	(Panama) Tauro	Washington, D.C.
20:00 EDT	Pontius 48'; Johnson 56'	Report		Stadium: RFK Stadium; Attendance: 1,904; Referee: Hugo Cruz (Costa Rica)

October 21 4	Tauro (Panama)	0–1	(United States) D.C. United	Panama City
20:00 EDT			Shanosky 24'; Opare (yellow card) 84'; Korb (yellow card) 87'	Stadium: Estadio Rommel Fernández

=== U.S. Open Cup ===
June 17 Fourth round	Rochester Rhinos (New York (state))	1–0	(Washington, D.C.) D.C. United	Rochester, New York
19:00 EDT	Rolfe 27'	Report; Box Score	Birnbaum (yellow card) 50' (yellow-red card) 60'	Stadium: Sahlen's Stadium

=== Midseason friendlies ===
May 14	D.C. United	1–0	D.C. United U-23	Arlington, Virginia
19:30 EST	Seaton 37'	Report		Stadium: Long Bridge Park; Attendance: 200

July 26	D.C. United (United States)	0–3	(England) Fulham	Jacksonville, Florida
18:00 EDT		Report	Dembélé 22', 44', 75'	Stadium: EverBank Field; Attendance: 52,961

== Statistics ==
=== Appearances and goals ===
No.	Pos	Nat	Player	Total		MLS		MLS Cup Playoffs		U.S. Open Cup		CONCACAF Champions League	
No.	Pos	Nat	Player	Apps	Goals	Apps	Goals	Apps	Goals	Apps	Goals	Apps	Goals
2	DF	(United States) USA	Jeff Parke	13	0	13+0	0	0+0	0	0+0	0	0+0	0
3	MF	(United States) USA	David Estrada	3	0	0+1	0	0+1	0	0+0	0	1+0	0
4	DF	(Canada) CAN	Nana Attakora	2	0	0+0	0	0+0	0	1+0	0	1+0	0
5	DF	(United States) USA	Sean Franklin	20	2	17+1	1	1+1	1	0+0	0	0+0	0
6	DF	(United States) USA	Kofi Opare	1	0	0+0	0	0+0	0	0+0	0	1+0	0
7	FW	(United States) USA	Eddie Johnson	22	5	19+0	4	1+1	0	0+0	0	1+0	1
8	MF	(United States) USA	Davy Arnaud	24	2	21+1	2	2+0	0	0+0	0	0+0	0
9	FW	(Argentina) ARG	Fabián Espíndola	19	8	15+2	8	2+0	0	0+0	0	0+0	0
11	FW	(United States) USA	Luis Silva	19	7	13+5	7	0+0	0	0+0	0	0+1	0
12	MF	(United States) USA	Alex Caskey	10	0	1+7	0	0+0	0	1+0	0	1+0	0
13	FW	(United States) USA	Chris Pontius	2	0	0+0	0	2+0	0	0+0	0	0+0	0
14	MF	(United States) USA	Nick DeLeon	23	3	21+0	2	2+0	1	0+0	0	0+0	0
15	DF	(United States) USA	Steve Birnbaum	13	0	10+0	0	2+0	0	1+0	0	0+0	0
17	MF	(United States) USA	Conor Shanosky	1	0	0+0	0	0+0	0	0+0	0	1+0	0
18	FW	(United States) USA	Chris Rolfe	24	6	19+2	6	1+1	0	0+1	0	0+0	0
19	MF	(Canada) CAN	Kyle Porter	5	0	0+3	0	0+0	0	1+0	0	1+0	0
20	DF	(United States) USA	Jalen Robinson	1	0	0+0	0	0+0	0	1+0	0	0+0	0
21	DF	(Ghana) GHA	Samuel Inkoom	0	0	0+0	0	0+0	0	0+0	0	0+0	0
22	DF	(United States) USA	Chris Korb	14	0	12+1	0	1+0	0	0+0	0	0+0	0
23	MF	(United States) USA	Perry Kitchen	23	3	21+0	3	2+0	0	0+0	0	0+0	0
24	MF	(England) ENG	Lewis Neal	23	0	6+14	0	0+1	0	1+0	0	1+0	0
25	MF	(United States) USA	Jared Jeffrey	9	0	1+6	0	0+0	0	1+0	0	1+0	0
27	MF	(United States) USA	Collin Martin	6	0	1+3	0	0+0	0	1+0	0	1+0	0
28	GK	(United States) USA	Bill Hamid	19	0	19+0	0	0+0	0	0+0	0	0+0	0
29	FW	(Jamaica) JAM	Michael Seaton	2	0	0+1	0	0+0	0	0+1	0	0+0	0
30	FW	(United States) USA	Conor Doyle	18	0	1+16	0	0+0	0	1+0	0	0+0	0
31	GK	(United States) USA	Joe Willis	1	0	0+0	0	0+0	0	0+0	0	1+0	0
32	DF	(United States) USA	Bobby Boswell	26	1	23+0	1	2+0	0	0+1	0	0+0	0
33	DF	(United States) USA	Taylor Kemp	7	0	2+1	0	1+0	0	2+0	0	0+1	0
50	GK	(United States) USA	Andrew Dykstra	5	0	4+0	0	0+0	0	1+0	0	0+0	0
Players who left the club during the 2014 season
3	DF	(Spain) ESP	Christian	15	0	15+0	0	0+0	0	0+0	0	0+0	0
21	FW	(Haiti) HAI	Christiano François	0	0	0+0	0	0+0	0	0+0	0	0+0	0

Statistics current as of August 20, 2014
Sources: D.C. United Season Statistics; DC United Squad - ESPN FC

=== Top scorers ===
Rank	Pos	No.	Player	MLS	MLS Cup Playoffs	U.S. Open Cup	CCL	Total
1	FW	9	(Argentina) Fabian Espindola	11	0	0	2	13
2	FW	11	(United States) Luis Silva	11	0	0	0	11
3	FW	7	(United States) Eddie Johnson	7	0	0	2	9
4	MF	18	(United States) Chris Rolfe	6	0	0	0	6
5	MF	23	(United States) Perry Kitchen	5	0	0	0	5
6	MF	14	(United States) Nick DeLeon	2	1	0	0	3
7	MF	8	(United States) Davy Arnaud	2	0	0	0	2
7	DF	5	(United States) Sean Franklin	1	1	0	0	2
7	FW	13	(United States) Chris Pontius	1	0	0	1	2
10	DF	32	(United States) Bobby Boswell	1	0	0	0	1
10	DF	33	(United States) Taylor Kemp	1	0	0	0	1
13	MF	17	(United States) Conor Shanosky	0	0	0	1	1

=== Top assists ===
Rank	Pos	No.	Player	MLS	MLS Cup Playoffs	U.S. Open Cup	CCL	Total
1	FW	9	(Argentina) Fabián Espíndola	9	0	0	0	9
2	MF	18	(United States) Chris Rolfe	6	0	0	0	6
3	MF	14	(United States) Nick DeLeon	5	0	0	0	5
4	FW	11	(United States) Luis Silva	4	0	0	0	4
4	MF	23	(United States) Perry Kitchen	4	0	0	0	4
4	DF	5	(United States) Sean Franklin	4	0	0	0	4
4	MF	3	(United States) David Estrada	2	0	0	2	4
8	DF	32	(United States) Bobby Boswell	3	0	0	0	3
8	DF	22	(United States) Chris Korb	3	0	0	0	3
8	FW	7	(United States) Eddie Johnson	3	0	0	0	3
8	DF	33	(United States) Taylor Kemp	2	1	0	0	3
8	DF	21	(Ghana) Samuel Inkoom	1	0	0	2	3
13	DF	3	(Spain) Christian	1	0	0	0	1
13	MF	24	(England) Lewis Neal	1	0	0	0	1
13	GK	28	(United States) Bill Hamid	1	0	0	0	1
13	DF	15	(United States) Steve Birnbaum	0	1	0	0	1

== Transfers ==
=== In ===
No.	Pos.	Player	Transferred from	Fee/notes	Date	Source
8	MF	(United States) Davy Arnaud	(Canada) Montreal Impact	Traded for international roster spot	December 10, 2013	
5	DF	(United States) Sean Franklin	(United States) Los Angeles Galaxy	Selected in 2013 MLS Re-Entry Draft Stage One	December 12, 2013	
32	DF	(United States) Bobby Boswell	(United States) Houston Dynamo	Selected in 2013 MLS Re-Entry Draft Stage One	December 12, 2013	
7	FW	(United States) Eddie Johnson	(United States) Seattle Sounders FC	Undisclosed	December 17, 2013	
9	FW	(Argentina) Fabián Espíndola	(United States) New York Red Bulls	Selected in 2013 MLS Re-Entry Draft Stage Two	December 18, 2013	
4	DF	(Canada) Nana Attakora	(United States) San Jose Earthquakes	Selected in 2013 MLS Re-Entry Draft Stage Two	December 18, 2013	
20	MF	(United States) Jalen Robinson	(United States) Wake Forest Demon Deacons	Signed a HGP contract	January 6, 2014	
2	DF	(United States) Jeff Parke	(United States) Philadelphia Union	Traded for Ethan White	January 14, 2014	
15	DF	(United States) Steve Birnbaum	(United States) California Golden Bears (United States) Orange County Blue Star	Selected in the first round of the 2014 MLS SuperDraft	January 16, 2014	
34	MF	(Spain) Victor Muñoz	(United States) UCLA Bruins (United States) OC Blues Strikers	Selected in the second round of the 2014 MLS SuperDraft	January 16, 2014	
35	MF	(United States) Zach Barnes	(United States) Creighton Bluejays (United States) Portland Timbers U23s	Selected in the third round of the 2014 MLS SuperDraft	January 21, 2014	
40	DF	(United States) Travis Golden	(United States) Campbell Camels (United States) Austin Aztex	Selected in the fourth round of the 2014 MLS SuperDraft	January 21, 2014	
21	FW	(Haiti) Christiano Francois	(United States) Maryland Terrapins	Waiver Draft	January 24, 2014	
3	DF	(Spain) Christian	(Spain) Almería	Free	February 7, 2014	
12	MF	(United States) Alex Caskey	(United States) Seattle Sounders FC	Traded for 2016 MLS SuperDraft third round pick	March 4, 2014	
18	MF	(United States) Chris Rolfe	(United States) Chicago Fire	Undisclosed	April 2, 2014	
6	DF	(Ghana) Kofi Opare	(United States) Los Angeles Galaxy	Swapped allocation ranking with the LA Galaxy	July 29, 2014	
3	M/F	(Mexico) David Estrada	(United States) Seattle Sounders FC	Traded for the third pick in the 2017 MLS SuperDraft	August 7, 2014	
21	D/M	(Ghana) Samuel Inkoom	(Greece) Platanias		September 5, 2014	

=== Out ===
No.	Pos.	Player	Transferred to	Fee/notes	Date	Source
26	FW	(Colombia) Lionard Pajoy	(Colombia) La Equidad	Released	October 30, 2013	
20	FW	(Guatemala) Carlos Ruiz	(Guatemala) Municipal	Released	October 30, 2013	
11	MF	(Brazil) Marcelo Saragosa	(United States) Tampa Bay Rowdies	Released	October 30, 2013	
7	FW	(Canada) Dwayne De Rosario	(Canada) Toronto FC	Released	October 31, 2013	
6	MF	(Indonesia) Syamsir Alam	(Belgium) Vise	Loan expired, option declined	November 1, 2013	
2	DF	(United States) James Riley	(United States) LA Galaxy	Option declined	December 9, 2013	
8	MF	(United States) John Thorrington	Retired	Option declined, subsequently retired	December 9, 2013	
21	DF	(United States) Daniel Woolard	Retired	Option declined	December 9, 2013	
15	DF	(United States) Ethan White	(United States) Philadelphia Union	Traded for Jeff Parke	January 14, 2014	
5	DF	(Canada) Dejan Jakovic	(Japan) Shimizu S-Pulse	Undisclosed (~375K est.)	January 14, 2014	
40	MF	(United States) Travis Golden	(United States) Austin Aztex	Released	February 13, 2014	
35	MF	(United States) Zach Barnes	(United States) Lane United	Released	February 13, 2014	
16	FW	(United States) Casey Townsend	(United States) Tampa Bay Rowdies	Waived	February 19, 2014	
34	MF	(Spain) Victor Muñoz	(United States) Sporting Kansas City	Released	March 3, 2014	
3	DF	(Spain) Christian	(Spain) UD Las Palmas	Mutually-terminated contract	July 1, 2014	
21	FW	(Haiti) Christiano François	(United States) Ironbound Soul	Released	August 8, 2014	

=== Loan out ===
No.	Pos.	Player	Loaned to	Start	End	Source
31	GK	(United States) Joe Willis	(United States) Richmond Kickers	February 26, 2014		
21	FW	(Haiti) Christiano François	(United States) Richmond Kickers	February 26, 2014	August 8, 2014	
24	MF	(United States) Collin Martin	(United States) Richmond Kickers	February 26, 2014		
15	DF	(United States) Steve Birnbaum	(United States) Richmond Kickers	March 22, 2014		
29	FW	(Jamaica) Michael Seaton	(United States) Richmond Kickers	March 22, 2014		
19	MF	(Canada) Kyle Porter	(United States) Richmond Kickers	April 4, 2014		

== See also ==
- D.C. United
- List of D.C. United seasons
- 2014 Major League Soccer season
- 2014 MLS Cup Playoffs
- 2014 U.S. Open Cup
- 2014–15 CONCACAF Champions League
- 2014 in American soccer
