= 2012 D.C. United season =

D.C. United
2012 season
- General manager: Dave Kasper
- Head coach: Ben Olsen
- Stadium: RFK Stadium
- MLS: Eastern Conference: 2nd Overall: 3rd
- MLS Cup Playoffs: Conference finals
- U.S. Open Cup: Fourth round
- Carolina Challenge Cup: Winners
- Atlantic Cup: Winners
- World Football Challenge: 0–0–1
- Top goalscorer: League: Chris Pontius (12); All: Chris Pontius (12)
- Highest home attendance: 20,015 vs. HOU
- Lowest home attendance: 10,135 vs. MTL
- Average home league attendance: Regular season: 13,835; Playoffs: 18,786
Home colors	Away colors	Third colors

The 2012 D.C. United season was the club's seventeenth season of existence, and their seventeenth consecutive season of playing in Major League Soccer, the top division of American soccer. The club's season began on March 10, with a 0–1 home defeat against Sporting Kansas City, and culminated on November 18 with a 1–1 draw against Houston Dynamo.

Under Ben Olsen, his second full season in charge, the club went through a tremendous improvement in form, qualifying for the playoffs for the first time since 2007, and reaching the Eastern Conference championship for the first time since 2006. During the regular season, United amassed 58 points during the season, which tied their record from 1998 for the most points during the regular season, although the 1998 season only had 32 matches instead of 34. Still, the club averaged 1.7 points per match, which is tied for the third best on record.

United saw success in the conference semifinals of the MLS Cup Playoffs, defeating their I-95 rivals, the New York Red Bulls 2–1 on aggregate, before eventually losing to the defending Eastern Conference postseason champions, Houston Dynamo, 4–2 on aggregate.

Outside of MLS, United reached the round of 16 of the U.S. Open Cup, where they lost in extra time to the Philadelphia Union.

As of 2024, this is the most recent time D.C. United advanced to the conference final.

== Background ==
Ahead of the 2012 season, it was head coach Ben Olsen's first club campaign as full-time manager. During 2011, United improve from their 6–20–4 record and improved to 9–13–12, but failing to qualify for the MLS Cup Playoffs for a franchise-record four seasons. United improved their scoring output, scoring 47 goals during the regular season, third in the league, and had the fourth best away record of MLS clubs during 2011.

== Review ==
=== Preseason ===
On November 3, United's Ethan White and Perry Kitchen were called up to the United States under-23 national team, ahead of November 7 and 15 fixtures in Germany. On November 29, D.C. United signed Robbie Russell from Real Salt Lake in exchange for a third round pick in the 2013 MLS SuperDraft.

Ahead of the 2011 MLS Re-Entry Draft, Dave Kasper, the club General Manager, released a list of nine players exposed for the Re-Entry Draft. These players' options to have their contracts extended were declined. The Re-Entry Draft resulted in United's Marc Burch and Clyde Simms being transferred to the Seattle Sounders FC and New England Revolution, respectively. On December 1, Charlie Davies' loan from Sochaux expired, with United having the option to purchase his contract from French outfitters. Despite the option, United declined to exercise their option to purchase Davies' contract from Sochaux, resulting in Davies returning to the club. Three days later, long-time United midfielder Santino Quaranta, whose contract was declined by United. During the actual Re-Entry Draft, held on December 5, United made no selections.

During the 2012 MLS SuperDraft, United made one selection in the draft, selecting Louisville Cardinals men's soccer standout, Nick DeLeon, with the seventh selection overall. DeLeon, a Generation adidas member, was subsequently signed by the club as an off-budget player. Two weeks later, during the 2012 MLS Supplemental Draft, United selected Lance Rozeboom from the University of New Mexico; Charles Rodriguez, from University of North Carolina at Charlotte, as well as Matt Kuhn from Drake University. Of the Supplemental selections, only Rozeboom was signed to a contract. The others were released without offers. Rozeboom, unfortunately, suffered a season-ending ACL injury during the Carolina Challenge Cup preseason tournament.

After what many cited as a quiet offseason for United, the club engaged in more winter trades following the Supplemental Draft. On January 18, United acquired Brazilian Maicon Santos from FC Dallas. Two days later, United traded an undisclosed amount of allocation money to fellow Texan MLS side, Houston Dynamo for midfielder Danny Cruz. After two domestic transfers, United acquired Argentine center-back Emiliano Dudar on a free transfer from Swiss side Young Boys.

United had their first two preseason scrimmages on January 29 and February 2, playing against fellow-MLS side, Chicago Fire and Swedish Allsvenskan-side, Malmö, respectively. Both matches ended in draws. Subsequently, DC United once again claimed the Carolina Challenge Cup with victories over the Charleston Battery and the Chicago Fire, with the final game against the Columbus Crew canceled because of severe weather.

On February 2, the club made headlines for the acquiring of Albanian striker Hamdi Salihi as a designated player, from Austrian side Rapid Wien. It was rumored that United outbid several European suitors, including Celtic and Rangers for Salihi. Many have cited the purchase of Salihi as United's largest transfer during the 2011–12 offseason, and a key role needed to fill the void left by Charlie Davies the previous season.

The club filled out the roster signing two preseason trialists from USL teams: goalkeeper Andrew Dykstra and left winger Lewis Neal. The club also loaned out Conor Shanosky to the Fort Lauderdale Strikers.

=== March ===
D.C. United opened the Major League Soccer regular season at home against Sporting Kansas City on March 10. Sporting, the defending Eastern Conference regular season champions, defeated United at RFK Stadium, 1–0 in United's final outing of the 2011 MLS season. That scoreline was repeated in the first match of the 2012 season. In the 93rd minute, a stoppage time corner kick by Sporting's Graham Zusi by Sporting resulted in a heading goal by C. J. Sapong giving Sporting the 1–0 lead and eventual victory over United.

United's offensive struggles continued as they traveled out west to take on the Los Angeles Galaxy, the defending MLS Cup and Supporters' Shield champions, on March 17. The Galaxy emerged with a 3–1 win, with United's lone bright spot being rookie Nick DeLeon's first MLS goal, as the team's first round draft pick scored in the 86th minute. The two-match West Coast swing concluded with a March 24 fixture at Vancouver Whitecaps FC, which ended in a 0–0 draw. United's only scoring chance came on a header by Designated Player Hamdi Salihi, that forced Whitecaps' goalie Joe Cannon into a quick reaction save.

A month that was marked by anemic offensive performances ended with a goal-scoring explosion as United returned home to RFK Stadium to take on FC Dallas, and the emergence of new factor in the attack as Maicon Santos scored twice and added an assist in a 4–1 thrashing of the visitors. Nick DeLeon had his second goal of the campaign and he added an assist on a goal by Danny Cruz.

=== April ===
During April, D.C. United went undefeated in their five league matches, winning thrice and drawing twice. The month opened with a regular season match at home to the Seattle Sounders FC. The fixture against Seattle ended in a scoreless draw, the club's second of the season, with United's Maicon Santos and Dejan Jakovic picking up yellow cards during the match. On April 14, United traveled northbound to take on Eastern Conference rivals, the New England Revolution at Gillette Stadium. After New England's José Moreno Mora opened up the scoresheet in the sixth minute, United equalized from a goal from Santos in the 19th minute. With nine minutes remaining, United's Chris Pontius received a pass from Emiliano Dudar and curled a shot around New England's Matt Reis, giving United a 2–1 lead and subsequent victory. The win marked the club's first victory at New England since August 5, 2007; when United earned a 3–0 victory at New England.

Following their victory at New England, United were in prime position to win consecutive league matches for the first time since June 2009. United, hot off a 2–1 victory at New England hosted struggling conference opponents, Montreal Impact, who were making their debutant season in MLS. In the April 18 affair, the Impact took the lead in the 68th minute off a strike from Bernardo Corradi. Montreal's lead quickly vanished as United's Santos restored parity in the 72nd minute. Santos would subsequently score, but the goal would be called back, giving United a 1–1 draw versus Montreal.

After the disappointing draw with Montreal, United put together the team's most dominant performance in April, with a 4–1 victory over the New York Red Bulls, led by Chris Pontius, who tallied his first career hat-trick with goals in the 8th, 32nd and 69th minutes. In between Nick DeLeon added a goal in the 35th minute. New York's Thierry Henry spoiled the shutout with a late free-kick goal.

United finally won consecutive matches when they closed out the month with a 3–2 home win over the Houston Dynamo. A header by Maicon Santos gave United the early lead in a first half controlled by United. A hamstring injury to Emiliano Dudar just before halftime helped the Dynamo back into the game. Playing a makeshift back line, United surrendered the lead in the 50th minute, thanks to a goal by the previous year's nemesis, Will Bruin. United regained the lead four minutes later, when Dwayne De Rosario scored his first goal of the season, but gave back the lead when Bruin added another goal in the 59th minute against a back line that clearly missed Dudar. United rebounded with a stunning game-winning header by Santos in the 70th minute.

=== May ===
May began with United playing their 5th game in 18 days and with a back line that had one healthy center-back, Brandon McDonald. The other center-backs, Emiliano Dudar, Dejan Jakovic and Ethan White, were all out due to injuries. Playing the hottest team in the league, the San Jose Earthquakes, the defenseless United surrendered 5 goals in a 5–3 defeat. The game started well for United with a goal by Dwayne De Rosario in the eighth minute. However, the disorganized United defense gave up three goals in a flurry before halftime, on goals by Chris Wondolowski, Steven Lenhart and Justin Morrow. United drew close, when Daniel Woolard scored a diving header in the 64th minute. San Jose soon pulled away as Wondolowski and Lenhart each scored their second goal of the game. Although the game was out of reach, United fans were buoyed with a late goal by substitute Hamdi Salihi, in the 88th minute. Salihi, United's much-hyped offseason signing, scored for the first time in league play, when he got on the end of a long pass by De Rosario, and neatly chipped it over the diving San Jose goalie, Jon Busch.

Following the loss at San Jose, United had no break in the schedule with another road game 4 days later. The team did catch somewhat of a lucky break as they were playing winless Toronto FC. Head Coach Ben Olsen had a few surprises in store, as he bolstered the defense by putting Andy Najar at right back and moving Woolard to center-back. Bill Hamid was back in goal for the first time since United's season opener. Hamid's slot as the team's starting goalkeeper had gone to Joe Willis based on Willis' strong performances while Hamid was with the USA's U23 team in that team's failed effort at Olympic qualifying. After a defensive first half, with few chances for either team, United broke through on a long strike by Chris Pontius in the 55th minute. Hamdi Salihi once again came off the bench and closed out the scoring in a 2–0 win with his second goal in two games, this one coming on an acrobatic overhead scissors kick.

Upon the victory at Toronto, United faced the Houston Dynamo in a rematch from April 28, when United won 3–2. The match was a special occasion for the Dynamo, as the club was opening their brand-new soccer-specific stadium, BBVA Compass Stadium. The hosts would earn a 1–0 victory thanks to a 67th-minute strike from Houston's Brad Davis, who volley a 35-yard shot.

The three game road swing ended following the Houston match, where United began a three-match homestand against Colorado Rapids, Toronto FC and New England Revolution, respectively. United are riding on a two-match winning streak, defeating Colorado and Toronto by two-goal score lines. On May 26, United will play host to the Revolution.

Following these league fixtures, United will conclude the month of May with the start of their U.S. Open Cup campaign. Entering in the third round proper, United will travel south on the I-95 corridor to take on USL Pro side, Richmond Kickers. To be played at Richmond's City Stadium, this will mark the first matchup between the two sides since 2010, but the first time since 2008 that the Kickers will host United.

=== June ===
Due to breaks from the FIFA international calendar, D.C. United only played three league matches during June, all of which were in the second half of the month. Aside from their three regular season fixtures, United played a fourth round match of the U.S. Open Cup. Across all competitions, United earned a record of a pair of wins and losses, and zero ties.

Their first match of the month was the Open Cup match on June 5, where United hosted the Philadelphia Union at the Maryland SoccerPlex in Boyds, Maryland. For the two rivals, this was the first time the sides met one another in the domestic cup competition. Former United midfielder, Brian Carroll of the Union netted the opening goal in stoppage time of the first half, only for United's Josh Wolff to equalize minutes later. The 1–1 gridlock would stand through regulation time. Since the Open Cup does not feature replay matches, the match was decided in extra time. During extra time, Philadelphia's Antoine Hoppenot netted the eventual match-winning goal just three minutes into extra time, giving the Union a berth into the quarterfinals, and eliminating United's Open Cup odds. It was the second consecutive tournament that United failed to earn a place in the quarterfinals or deeper in the Open Cup.

Eleven days later, the two sides would meet again in MLS league play, but at the Union's PPL Park. In years past, United had failed to defeat the Union in Philadelphia, losing both their outings by 3–2 score lines. The chippy affair saw Philadelphia dominate possession, but in spite of this, United came away with a 1–0 road victory, thanks to a goal from United striker, Chris Pontius in the 78th minute. The win gave United their fourth consecutive win in league play for the first time since 2007, and saw them top the Eastern Conference for the first time since 2009.

The fact United topped the Eastern Conference, while their Atlantic Cup rivals, the New York Red Bulls were second the conference added extra weight to the league meeting between the two sides. In front of a Red Bull Arena sell-out crowd of 25,187; the June 24 match between the Red Bulls and United saw the Black-and-Red score their quickest goal in franchise history, with Pontius scoring 31 seconds into the match off of a Danny Cruz cross. New York answered in the 20th minute, with ex-United midfielder, Brandon Barklage tallying a goal in the 20th minute, his first with the Red Bulls. Barklage scored his second Red Bulls career goal inside three minutes of the second half, giving the Red Bulls a 2–1 advantage over United. Along with Barklage, New York's Jan Gunnar Solli scored his first career goal with the club, giving the Red Bulls a 3–1 lead in the 55th minute. The two-goal advantage was short-lived, however, as Pontius netted again for United just nine minutes later. A teasing pass from Maicon Santos saw Pontius dribble around Red Bulls goalie, Ryan Meara and easily slot it into the back of the net. Ultimately, the match would end in New York's favor, winning 3–2, additionally the Red Bulls earned their first victory against United at Red Bull Arena, and won at home against their rivals for the first time since August 10, 2008.

With the loss, D.C. and New York drew level atop the Eastern Conference standings.

=== July ===
July was an otherwise quiet month for D.C. United, as the club only played two regular season fixtures, and a mid-season friendly match. The lack of matches during the span was primarily due to the FIFA International Match Calendar and MLS's desire not to have conflicting dates with the match calendar.

In league play, July was a rather frustrating patch, as D.C. United lost two games by a combined score of 5–0, losing by four to Houston Dynamo and one against Columbus Crew, both matches being on the road. The lopsided result against Houston was largely due to the ejection of starting goalkeeper, Bill Hamid, 20 minutes in, when United and the Dynamo were drawn at zero.

D.C. United also played Paris-Saint Germain of France and drew 1–1.

=== August ===
If July was a down month, then August was an up and down month for D.C. United. An early second half goal by Pontius was enough for a 1–0 home win over Columbus, but United next dropped a road match in Kansas City, despite a first-half goal by DeLeon. With two home games next, United was able to secure a draw against the Union, despite an early goal by former D.C. United regular Brian Carroll. United scored the tying goal on an own goal that came on a free kick taken by Branko Bošković, but Bošković was ejected 20 minutes later because of a scrum after De Rosario had seemingly earned the win for United with penalty kick goal in the 87th minute. An encroachment call nullified the goal, and De Rosario missed on the second try. The offense was back in gear for a 4–2 win over Chicago Fire, thanks to goals by De Rosario, Pajoy and the unlikely pair of McDonald and Tan. A trip to Montreal resulted in a 3–0 drubbing, but United seemed in position to close out the month with a win at home, holding a 2–1 lead over New York, thanks to goals by DeLeon and De Rosario. Unfortunately, the team surrendered a late goal and had to settle for a point.

=== September ===
D.C. United started the month with a disappointing 1–0 loss in Salt Lake. As disappointing as the loss was, the team soon got much worse news, as De Rosario injured his knee on international duty with the Canadian national team. Without his primary attacking threat, Olsen quickly changed his tactics to a much more defensive set and approach, which would come to be known as "Bennyball." In their first match without their captain, the team fell behind at home against New England, but thanks to the heroic efforts of Pontius, the team rallied for a 2–1 win. Pontius had a goal and assisted on the winning goal, Lewis Neal's first ever for D.C. In their next match, against Philadelphia, D.C. only generated a couple of chances, but they scored on one of them, when Pontius got on the end of a pass, forcing the goalie to challenge him and passed to a wide open Pajoy, who scored the game's only goal in a 1–0 win. The team continued their stingy ways in their return home, eking out a 1–0 win over lowly Chivas USA, on a second half goal by one-time Designated Player Branko Bošković. The goal was also noteworthy as the one and only regular season goal that Bošković scored in his time with the team. A trip to Portland produced another point, but a penalty goal by Pontius was not enough for the win, as United surrendered the tying goal in the 70th minute. Still United had closed out the month with 3 straight wins followed by a draw, all coming after De Rosario's season-ending injury.

=== October ===
D.C.'s stunning unbeaten streak continued with a 1–0 home win against Toronto FC, setting up a crucial match against Columbus in United's final regular season home game of the year. A playoff spot was on the line, and a sell-out crowd watched the most exciting match of the season. United fell behind on an early goal by the Crew's Eddie Gaven, but the home team evened the score in the 39th minute, on a goal by DeLeon. Two minutes later, Columbus was back in the lead, on a goal by Jairo Arrieta. Marcelo Saragosa leveled the score for D.C. in the 59th minute. The score remained 2–2 until the first minute of stoppage time. Hamdi Salihi won a loose ball in the defensive end, and passed the ball back to Chris Korb, who sent a hopeful long ball for Bošković. The Montenegrin Bošković hit a one-time left-footed volley over a defender towards a wide-open Neal, who hit a one-time volley of his own, past the onrushing goalkeeper, and securing United's first playoff spot since 2007. United closed out the regular season and a season-best seven-game unbeaten streak with a 1–1 draw in Chicago, thanks to a goal by Pajoy.

=== November ===
In the Eastern Conference semi-finals round of the 2012 MLS Cup playoffs, D.C. United faced arch-foe New York Red Bulls in what would become one of the most memorable playoff series in league history. The opening match of the home-and-home series was played in Washington, effectively giving New York the home field advantage of hosting the return match, despite the fact that United had finished higher in the standings. The game would have been played at Red Bull Arena, but New Jersey was still struggling to recover from the devastation wreaked by Hurricane Sandy. In the series opener, the teams drew 1–1, trading own goals midway through the second half. New York defender Roy Miller sent an attempted clearance into New York's net in the 60th minute. New York was awarded the tying goal, when Bill Hamid went up to take a header into the box away from a Red Bull defender who was standing directly in front of United's goalie. Hamid fell back into the goal while holding the ball, though he tried to keep it out. The ball was ruled across the line and no foul was given, leaving the teams deadlocked heading into the return match. United would also have to play that match without the gifted Andy Najar who received a second yellow card ejection for throwing a ball at a New York player with about 20 minutes remaining.

It was the return match that really indelibly stamped this series into the pages of league history. The weather once-again played havoc with this series. A large contingent of D.C. United fans left the Washington area in a convoy of 11 buses as snowflakes were beginning to fall in the mid-Atlantic region. By the time they reached New Jersey, they were in the midst of a potent nor'easter. Few local fans even turned up for the game, but MLS did not immediately postpone the match. As grounds crew and even the league's top two executives tried to clear snow from the field, the rival coaches argued with the league officials and the referees about whether to play the match. United's coach Olsen was adamant that they should play, but after a delay of 45 minutes, the league finally decided to postpone the match by a day. Fewer D.C. United supporters were available to make the trip back up the highway the next day, but those who did were rewarded with a victory that would become legend.

The D.C. United goal was under a nearly-constant, withering assault almost the entire match, but Hamid made one spectacular save after another to keep the match scoreless until the 69th minute. That's when referee Mark Geiger showed Hamid a straight red card, after the goalie had come out to defend a breakaway by Red Bulls' striker Kenny Cooper and either did or did not initiate contact with Cooper. An irate Hamid was replaced by back-up 'keeper Joe Willis, who would carve his name into the team's annals and the hearts of United fans forever. Cooper beat Willis on the spot kick, beat referee Geiger ordered a retake because of encroachment by two Red Bulls players. Willis confidently dove left and blocked Cooper's second attempt. United was forced to play short-handed for a short time, but a reckless tackle against Pontius by the Red Bulls' Rafa Marquez earned a second yellow card and ejection. Shortly before stoppage time, D.C. went ahead, as a deft pass by defender Robbie Russell found Nick DeLeon. who slipped the ball over the sliding New York goalkeeper for what seemed to be the series winning goal. However, the Red Bulls had an excellent opportunity to force extra-time as they lined up a free kick on the edge of the penalty area during stoppage time. Despite having one of the greatest players in the history of the sport, Thierry Henry, who was also one of the great set-piece takers, the Red Bulls players decided to let Miller take the kick, and he sent it over the net. United left New Jersey with a 2–1 aggregate score series victory.

The Eastern Conference championship series could not match the semi-final for drama, but it was not without its own share of drama. D.C. United traveled to Houston for the opening match. DeLeon gave United a 1–0 lead in the 27th minute. United seemed poised to take control of the series when Raphael Augusto, who was making his first start, was taken down by Dynamo defender André Hainault on a breakaway opportunity. This seemed to be a clear automatic red card situation, but no foul was even called on the play. Spared the red card ejection, Hainault evened the score in the second half with a goal of his own. Two more goals, one by Will Bruin and the other by Kofi Sarkodie left the Dynamo in a commanding position heading into the return match in Washington. The loss ended United's nine-game unbeaten streak. In the return match, Houston struck first, on a goal by Oscar Boniek Garcia to take an insurmountable lead. A late goal by Bošković made the aggregate score 4–2, but United could draw no closer, ending their remarkable season.

== Competitions ==
Competition	Started round	Current position / round	Final position / round	First match	Last match
Major League Soccer	—	—	3rd	March 12, 2012	October 27, 2012
MLS Cup Playoffs	Conference semifinals	—	Conference finals	November 3, 2012	November 18, 2012
U.S. Open Cup	Third round	—	Fourth round	May 29, 2012	June 5, 2012
Carolina Challenge Cup	—	—	1st	February 24, 2012	March 1, 2012

Updated to match played November 29, 2011
Source: Competitions

=== Preseason ===
==== Florida training camp ====
January 29, 2012	D.C. United	0–0	Chicago Fire	Fort Myers, Florida
14:00 UTC-5		Report		Stadium: Florida Gulf Coast University; Attendance: 1,800

February 2, 2012	D.C. United	1–1	Malmö	Bradenton, Florida
10:30 UTC-5	Kitchen (yellow card) 32'; Richter 54'	Report	Friberg 14'	Stadium: IMG Academy

==== Arizona training camp ====
February 11, 2012	Sporting Kansas City	2–1	D.C. United	Casa Grande, Arizona
14:00 UTC-5	Zusi 34'; Saad 62'		Jakovic (yellow card) 32'; DeLeon (yellow card) 57'; Burciaga 78'	Stadium: Grande Sports World

February 14, 2012	D.C. United	1–1	Real Salt Lake	Phoenix, Arizona
12:30 UTC-5	Dudar (yellow card) 20'; Rozeboom 76'	Report	Bengelloun (red card) 27'; Olave 33'; Gil (yellow card) 37'	Stadium: Reach 11 Sports Complex

==== Carolina Challenge Cup ====
February 24, 2012 Group 1	D.C. United	1–0	Chicago Fire	Charleston, South Carolina
20:00 UTC-5	Saragosa (yellow card) 30'; Dudar (yellow card) 50'; Salihi 65'	Report	Gargan (yellow card) 33'; Robayo (yellow card) 52'; Anibaba (yellow card) 77'	Stadium: Blackbaud Stadium

February 29, 2012 Group 2	Charleston Battery	1–3	D.C. United	Charleston, South Carolina
15:00 UTC-5	Cuevas 29'; Wiltse (red card) 76'	Report	Santos 13'; Richter 31'; Salihi 88'	Stadium: Blackbaud Stadium; Attendance: 2,634

March 3, 2012 Group 3	D.C. United	—	Columbus Crew	Charleston, South Carolina
20:00 UTC-5				Stadium: Blackbaud Stadium
Note: Match cancelled due to inclement weather.

=== Major League Soccer ===
==== Standings ====
Eastern Conference Table

Pos	Team	Pld	W	L	T	GF	GA	GD	Pts	Qualification
1	Sporting Kansas City	34	18	7	9	42	27	+15	63	Qualification for the conference semifinals
2	D.C. United	34	17	10	7	53	43	+10	58	Qualification for the conference semifinals
3	New York Red Bulls	34	16	9	9	57	46	+11	57	Qualification for the conference semifinals
4	Chicago Fire	34	17	11	6	46	41	+5	57	Qualification for the knockout round
5	Houston Dynamo	34	14	9	11	48	41	+7	53	Qualification for the knockout round
6	Columbus Crew	34	15	12	7	44	44	0	52	
7	Montreal Impact	34	12	16	6	45	51	−6	42	
8	Philadelphia Union	34	10	18	6	37	45	−8	36	
9	New England Revolution	34	9	17	8	39	44	−5	35	
10	Toronto FC	34	5	21	8	36	62	−26	23	

Source: MLS

Overall table

Pos	Team	Pld	W	L	T	GF	GA	GD	Pts	
1	San Jose Earthquakes (S)	34	19	6	9	72	43	+29	66	Qualification for the CONCACAF Champions League
2	Sporting Kansas City (U)	34	18	7	9	42	27	+15	63	Qualification for the CONCACAF Champions League
3	D.C. United	34	17	10	7	53	43	+10	58	
4	New York Red Bulls	34	16	9	9	57	46	+11	57	
5	Real Salt Lake	34	17	11	6	46	35	+11	57	
6	Chicago Fire	34	17	11	6	46	41	+5	57	
7	Seattle Sounders FC	34	15	8	11	51	33	+18	56	
8	LA Galaxy (C)	34	16	12	6	59	47	+12	54	Qualification for the CONCACAF Champions League
9	Houston Dynamo	34	14	9	11	48	41	+7	53	Qualification for the CONCACAF Champions League
10	Columbus Crew	34	15	12	7	44	44	0	52	
11	Vancouver Whitecaps FC	34	11	13	10	35	41	−6	43	
12	Montreal Impact	34	12	16	6	45	51	−6	42	Qualification for the CONCACAF Champions League
13	FC Dallas	34	9	13	12	42	47	−5	39	
14	Colorado Rapids	34	11	19	4	44	50	−6	37	
15	Philadelphia Union	34	10	18	6	37	45	−8	36	
16	New England Revolution	34	9	17	8	39	44	−5	35	
17	Portland Timbers	34	8	16	10	34	56	−22	34	
18	Chivas USA	34	7	18	9	24	58	−34	30	
19	Toronto FC (V)	34	5	21	8	36	62	−26	23	

Source: MLS
Rules for classification: 1) points; 2) head-to-head record; 3) goal difference; 4) number of goals scored
(C) MLS Cup champions; (S) Supporters' Shield winners; (U) U.S. Open Cup winners; (V) Canadian Championship winners

==== Results summary ====
Overall								Home						Away					
Pld	W	D	L	GF	GA	GD	Pts	W	D	L	GF	GA	GD	W	D	L	GF	GA	GD
34	17	7	10	53	43	+10	58	12	4	1	37	17	+20	5	3	9	16	26	−10

Last updated: October 28, 2012.
Source: Match results

==== Results by round ====
Round	1	2	3	4	5	6	7	8	9	10	11	12	13	14	15	16	17	18	19	20	21	22	23	24	25	26	27	28	29	30	31	32	33	34
Stadium	H	A	A	H	H	A	H	H	H	A	A	A	H	H	H	A	A	H	A	A	H	A	H	H	A	H	A	H	A	H	A	A	H	A
Result	L	L	D	W	D	W	D	W	W	L	W	L	W	W	W	W	L	W	L	L	W	L	D	W	L	D	L	W	W	W	D	W	W	D

Updated to match(es) played on October 28, 2012. Source: MLSSoccer.com
A = Away; H = Home; W = Win; D = Draw; L = Loss

==== Matches ====
March 10, 2012 1	D.C. United	0–1	Sporting Kansas City	Washington, D.C.
19:30 UTC-5	Bošković (yellow card) 54'	Report	Bunbury (yellow card) 52'; Sapong 90+3'	Stadium: RFK Stadium; Attendance: 16,314; Referee: Mark Geiger

March 18, 2012 2	L.A. Galaxy	3–1	D.C. United	Carson, California
19:00 UTC-5	Donovan (yellow card) 38'; Keane 45', 69'; Juninho (yellow card) 83'; Sarvas 86'	Report	Santos (yellow card) 39'; DeLeon 87'	Stadium: The Home Depot Center; Attendance: 18,466; Referee: Baldomero Toledo

March 24, 2012 3	Vancouver Whitecaps FC	0–0	D.C. United	Vancouver, British Columbia
22:00 UTC-5	Hassli (yellow card) 33'	Report	Santos (yellow card) 35'; Pontius (yellow card) 70'	Stadium: BC Place; Attendance: 19,394; Referee: Kevin Stott

March 30, 2012 4	D.C. United	4–1	FC Dallas	Washington, D.C.
19:30 UTC-5	McDonald (yellow card) 20'; Santos 28', 73'; DeLeon 60'; Cruz 65'; De Rosario (yellow card) 78'	Report	Pérez 41'; D. Hernández (yellow card) 40' (yellow-red card) 77'	Stadium: RFK Stadium; Attendance: 13,169; Referee: Hilario Grajeda

April 7, 2012 5	D.C. United	0–0	Seattle Sounders FC	Washington, D.C.
19:30 UTC-5	Santos (yellow card) 12'; Jakovic (yellow card) 30'	Report		Stadium: RFK Stadium; Attendance: 15,651; Referee: Edvin Jurisevic

April 14, 2012 6	New England Revolution	1–2	D.C. United	Foxborough, Massachusetts
16:00 UTC-5	Moreno 6'; Feilhaber (yellow card) 92'	Report	Santos 19'; McDonald (yellow card) 33'; Kitchen (yellow card) 73'; Pontius 82'	Stadium: Gillette Stadium; Attendance: 10,389; Referee: Jorge Gonzalez

April 18, 2012 7	D.C. United	1–1	Montreal Impact	Washington, D.C.
19:30 UTC-5	Santos 72'; Pontius (yellow card) 79'	Report	Corradi 68'; Wahl (yellow card) 74'	Stadium: RFK Stadium; Attendance: 10,135; Referee: Silviu Petrescu

April 22, 2012 8	D.C. United	4–1	New York Red Bulls	Washington, D.C.
18:00 UTC-5	Pontius 8', 32', 69'; DeLeon 36'; Kitchen (yellow card) 71'; Dudar (yellow card) 71'	Report	Henry 72'	Stadium: RFK Stadium; Attendance: 13,262; Referee: Mark Geiger

April 28, 2012 9	D.C. United	3–2	Houston Dynamo	Washington, D.C.
19:30 UTC-5	Santos 11', 70'; Cruz (yellow card) 32'; De Rosario 54' (yellow card) 63'	Report	Bruin 50', 59'; Ashe (yellow card) 64'; Carr (yellow card) 93+'	Stadium: RFK Stadium; Attendance: 13,975; Referee: Juan Guzman

May 2, 2012 10	San Jose Earthquakes	5–3	D.C. United	Santa Clara, California
22:30 UTC-5	Lenhart 19', 74'; Wondolowski 21', 69'; Marrow 31'; Dawkins (yellow card) 59'	Report	De Rosario 8'; Cruz (yellow card) 12'; Woolard 64'; Najar (yellow card) 78'; Salihi 88'	Stadium: Buck Shaw Stadium; Attendance: 8,734; Referee: Allen Chapman

May 5, 2012 11	Toronto FC	0–2	D.C. United	Toronto, Ontario Canada
16:30 UTC-5	Morgan (yellow card) 90'	Report	Pontius (yellow card) 52' (goal) 55'; Salihi 75'	Stadium: BMO Field; Attendance: 18,364

May 12, 2012 12	Houston Dynamo	1–0	D.C. United	Houston, Texas
16:30 UTC-5	Taylor (yellow card) 46'; Davis 67'; Moffat (yellow card) 92'	Report	Wolff (yellow card) 74'	Stadium: BBVA Compass Stadium; Attendance: 22,039; Referee: Hilario Grajeda

May 16, 2012 13	D.C. United	2–0	Colorado Rapids	Washington, D.C.
19:30 UTC-5	De Rosario 25'; Salihi (yellow card) 40' (goal) 60'; Najar (yellow card) 75'	Report	Larentowicz (yellow card) 61'; Rivero (yellow card) 86'; Marshall (yellow card) 91'	Stadium: RFK Stadium; Attendance: 11,593; Referee: Matthew Foerster

May 19, 2012 14	D.C. United	3–1	Toronto FC	Washington, D.C.
19:30 UTC-5	De Rosario 1', 43' (yellow card) 90'; Korb (yellow card) 28'; Salihi (yellow card) 31' (goal) 73'	Report	Johnson (yellow card) 12'; Koevermans 71'	Stadium: RFK Stadium; Attendance: 14,287; Referee: Geoff Gamble

May 26, 2012 15	D.C. United	3–2	New England Revolution	Washington, D.C.
19:30 UTC-5	McDonald 15'; Jakovic 46' (yellow card) 87'; Santos 61'	Report	Sène 48'; Soares 50'	Stadium: RFK Stadium; Attendance: 14,627; Referee: Kevin Stott

June 16, 2012 16	Philadelphia Union	0–1	D.C. United	Chester, Pennsylvania
19:00 UTC-5	McInerney (yellow card) 26'; Valdes (yellow card) 77'	Report	Jakovic (yellow card) 58'; Pontius 78'; Najar (yellow card) 81'; Hamid (yellow card) 91'	Stadium: PPL Park; Attendance: 18,876; Referee: Ricardo Salazar

June 24, 2012 17	New York Red Bulls	4–2	D.C. United	Harrison, New Jersey
19:00 UTC-5	Barklage 20', 47'; McCarty 38'; Solli 55' (yellow card) 93'		Pontius 1', 66'	Stadium: Red Bull Arena; Attendance: 25,187; Referee: Mark Geiger

June 30, 2012 18	D.C. United	3–0	Montreal Impact	Washington, D.C.
19:30 UTC-5	Pontius 45'; Russell 50'; Salihi 90'	Report	Warner (yellow card) 48'; Arnaud (yellow card) 84'; Valentin (yellow card) 89'	Stadium: RFK Stadium; Attendance: 18,302; Referee: Paul Ward

July 15, 2012 19	Houston Dynamo	4–0	D.C. United	Houston, Texas
19:00 UTC-5	Davis 19' (pen.); Bruin 37'; García 63'; Ching 89' (pen.)	Report	Hamid (red card) 17'	Stadium: BBVA Compass Stadium; Attendance: 18,871; Referee: Jasen Anno

July 21, 2012 20	Columbus Crew	1–0	D.C. United	Columbus, Ohio
19:00 UTC-5	Birchall 47'; Miranda (yellow card) 67'	Report		Stadium: Crew Stadium; Attendance: 17,150; Referee: Chris Penso

August 4, 2012 21	D.C. United	1–0	Columbus Crew	Washington, D.C.
19:30 UTC-5	Pontius 49'; Neal (yellow card) 74'	Report	Duka (yellow card) 24'; Meram (yellow card) 28'; Birchall (yellow card) 36'	Stadium: RFK Stadium; Attendance: 14,460; Referee: Allen Chapman

August 11, 2012 22	Sporting Kansas City	2–1	D.C. United	Kansas City, Kansas
20:30 UTC-5	Thomas (yellow card) 2'; Bunbury 13'; Espinoza (yellow card) 49'; Zusi 63' (yellow card) 90'; Sapong (yellow card) 92+'	Report	DeLeon 23'; Saragosa (yellow card) 46'; Dudar (yellow card) 94+'	Stadium: Livestrong Sporting Park; Attendance: 20,439; Referee: Edvin Jurisevic

August 19, 2012 23	D.C. United	1–1	Philadelphia Union	Washington, D.C.
17:00 UTC-5	Okugo , 70' (o.g.) Bošković (red card) 89'; Dudar (red card) 91+'; Hamid (yellow card) 96+'		Carroll 8'; Williams (yellow card) 37' (yellow-red card) 95+'; Lahoud (yellow card) 44'; McInerney (yellow card) 70'; Torres (yellow card) 89'; Farfan (yellow card) 89'	Stadium: RFK Stadium; Attendance: 12,312; Referee: Mark Geiger

August 22, 2012 24	D.C. United	4–2	Chicago Fire	Washington, D.C.
19:30 UTC-5	De Rosario 19'; Pajoy 46'; McDonald 51'; Hamid (yellow card) 80'; Tan 89'	Report	Paladini 44'; Segares 75'; MacDonald (yellow card) 81'; Pardo (yellow card) 83'	Stadium: RFK Stadium; Attendance: 10,291; Referee: Ismail Elfath

August 25, 2012 25	Montreal Impact	3–0	D.C. United	Montreal, Quebec
19:30 UTC-5	Di Vaio 24'; Bernier 50' (pen.) 90+2'	Report	McDonald (yellow card) 49'	Stadium: Saputo Stadium; Attendance: 20,011; Referee: Matthew Forester

August 29, 2012 26	D.C. United	2–2	New York Red Bulls	Washington, D.C.
19:30 UTC-5	DeLeon 21'; De Rosario 68' (yellow card) 72'	Report	Lindepere 19'; Conde 88'	Stadium: RFK Stadium; Attendance: 10,303; Referee: Ricardo Salazar

September 1, 2012 27	Real Salt Lake	1–0	D.C. United	Sandy, Utah
21:00 UTC-5	Morales (yellow card) 25'; Johnson 49'; Wingert (yellow card) 71'; Watson-Siriboe (yellow card) 82'	Report	Saragosa (yellow card) 60'; Dudar (yellow card) 78'; Korb (yellow card) 87'	Stadium: Rio Tinto Stadium; Attendance: 20,334; Referee: Silviu Petrescu

September 15, 2012 28	D.C. United	2–1	New England Revolution	Washington, D.C.
19:30 UTC-5	Pontius 32'; Korb (yellow card) 54'; Neal 63'; Santos (yellow card) 64'; Pajoy (yellow card) 77'	Report	Rowe 29'; Simms (yellow card) 65'	Stadium: RFK Stadium; Attendance: 15,104; Referee: Fotis Bazakos

September 20, 2012 29	Philadelphia Union	0–1	D.C. United	Chester, Pennsylvania
20:00 UTC-5		Report	Pajoy 67'	Stadium: PPL Park; Attendance: 16,024; Referee: Baldomero Toledo

September 23, 2012 30	D.C. United	1–0	Chivas USA	Washington, D.C.
19:00 UTC-5	Saragosa (yellow card) 60'; Bošković 64'; Najar (yellow card) 74'	Report	LaBrocca (yellow card) 68'; Townsend (yellow card) 90'	Stadium: RFK Stadium; Attendance: 11,770; Referee: Jose Carlos Rivero

September 29, 2012 31	Portland Timbers	1–1	D.C. United	Portland, Oregon
22:30 UTC-5	Wallace (yellow card) 24'; Danso (yellow card) 60'; Songo'o (yellow card) 70'; Dike 79'	Report	Pontius 60' (pen.)	Stadium: Jeld-Wen Field; Attendance: 20,438; Referee: Michael Kennedy

October 6, 2012 32	Toronto FC	0–1	D.C. United	Toronto, Ontario
13:00 UTC-5	Johnson (yellow card) 66'		Saragosa (yellow card) 75'; Salihi 88' (yellow card) 92+'	Stadium: BMO Field; Attendance: 15,281; Referee: Armando Villarreal

October 20, 2012 33	D.C. United	3–2	Columbus Crew	Washington, D.C.
19:30 UTC-5	DeLeon 39'; Saragosa 59'; Neal 91+'	Report	Arrieta (yellow card) 4' (goal) 41'; Gaven 7'; Mendes (yellow card) 26'; Williams (yellow card) 59'	Stadium: RFK Stadium; Attendance: 19,647; Referee: Edvin Jurisevic

October 27, 2012 34	Chicago Fire	1–1	D.C. United	Bridgeview, Illinois
19:30 UTC-5	Nyarko 16'; Friedrich (yellow card) 47'	Report	Pajoy 50'; McDonald (yellow card) 56'; Jakovic (yellow card) 82'	Stadium: Toyota Park; Attendance: 20,017; Referee: Jair Marrufo

=== MLS Cup Playoffs ===
==== Conference semifinals ====
November 3, 2012 Leg 1	D.C. United	1–1	New York Red Bulls	Washington, D.C.
20:00 UTC-5	Miller 61' (o.g.); Najar (yellow card) 71' (red card)	Report	Lade (yellow card) 23'; Hamid 65' (o.g.); Pearce (yellow card) 75'	Stadium: RFK Stadium; Attendance: 17,556; Referee: Jair Marrufo
Note: Order of the legs reversed due to Hurricane Sandy.

November 8, 2012 Leg 2	New York Red Bulls	0–1 (1–2 agg.)	D.C. United	Harrison, New Jersey
19:30 UTC-5	Márquez (yellow card) 61' (yellow-red card) 75'	Report	Hamid (red card) 69'; Pajoy (yellow card) 71'; DeLeon 87'	Stadium: Red Bull Arena; Attendance: 14,035; Referee: Mark Geiger
Note: Order of the legs reversed due to Hurricane Sandy. Match originally scheduled to be played on November 7 at 20:00 EST but was postponed to November 8 due to blizzard-like conditions from the November 2012 nor'easter.

==== Conference finals ====
November 11, 2012 Leg 1	Houston Dynamo	3–1	D.C. United	Houston, Texas
18:00 UTC-5	Hainault 51'; Bruin 68'; Kandji (yellow card) 77'; Sakodie 88'	Report	DeLeon 27'	Stadium: BBVA Compass Stadium; Attendance: 22,101; Referee: Ricardo Salazar

November 18, 2012 Leg 2	D.C. United	1–1 (2–4 agg.)	Houston Dynamo	Washington, D.C.
16:00 UTC-5	Bošković 83'	Report	García 33'	Stadium: RFK Stadium; Attendance: 20,015; Referee: Baldomero Toledo

=== U.S. Open Cup ===
May 29, 2012 Third round	Richmond Kickers (Virginia)	1–2 (a.e.t.)	(Washington, D.C.) D.C. United	Richmond, Virginia
19:00 UTC-5	Nyazamba 45+' (pen.)	Report	Salihi 24'; Saragosa 107'; Kitchen (yellow card) 111'	Stadium: City Stadium; Attendance: 5,014; Referee: Kai Goodrich

June 5, 2012 Fourth round	D.C. United (Washington, D.C.)	1–2 (a.e.t.)	(Pennsylvania) Philadelphia Union	Boyds, Maryland
19:30 UTC-5	McDonald (yellow card) 13' (red card) 113'; Dudar (yellow card) 27'; Wolff 45+1'		Carroll 45+1'; Valdés (yellow card) 55' (red card) 113'; Martínez (yellow card) 64'; M. Farfan (yellow card) 82'; Hoppenot 93'	Stadium: Maryland SoccerPlex; Attendance: 3,276

=== MLS Reserve League ===
May 20, 2012 1	New England Revolution Reserves	0–0	D.C. United Reserves	Foxborough, Massachusetts
18:00 UTC-5	Cárdenas (yellow card) 31'	Report	Mansally (yellow card) 81'	Stadium: Gillette Stadium; Referee: Niko Bratsis

June 9, 2012 2	D.C. United Reserves	4–3	Toronto FC Reserves	Washington, D.C.
10:30 UTC-5	King 16'; Santos 20'; Pontius 53'; Salihi 80'; Herrera (yellow card) 84'	Report	Marošević 29'; Makubuya 47'; Soolsma 89'	Stadium: RFK Auxiliary Field

July 22, 2012 3	Columbus Crew Reserves	4–1	D.C. United Reserves	Columbus, Ohio
11:00 UTC-5		Report		Stadium: Crew Stadium

August 13, 2012 4	D.C. United Reserves	3–1	New York Red Bulls Reserves	Washington, D.C.
10:30 UTC-5				Stadium: RFK Stadium

September 7, 2012 5	Montreal Impact Reserves	1–0	D.C. United Reserves	Montreal, Quebec
14:00 UTC-5				Stadium: Stade Saputo

September 11, 2012 6	D.C. United Reserves	0–2	Montreal Impact Reserves	Washington, D.C.
11:00 UTC-5				Stadium: RFK Stadium Auxiliary Field

October 6, 2012 7	Philadelphia Union Reserves	6–0	D.C. United Reserves	Chester, Pennsylvania
14:30 UTC-5	Hoffman 15', 56', 84', 90'; McLaughlin 61' (yellow card) 76'; Martinez 80'	Report	Chabala (yellow card) 76'	Stadium: Chester Park

October 12, 2012 8	D.C. United Reserves	1–0	Philadelphia Union Reserves	Washington, D.C.
12:00 UTC-5	King 6'	Report	Pfeffer (yellow card) 86'	Stadium: RFK Auxiliary Fields

October 21, 2012 9	D.C. United Reserves	0–2	Columbus Crew Reserves	Washington, D.C.
10:00 UTC-5	Augusto (yellow card) 60'	Report	Tchani (yellow card) 44'; Duka 45'; Finlay 56'	Stadium: RFK Auxiliary Fields; Attendance: Not reported

=== World Football Challenge ===
July 28, 2012	D.C. United (United States)	—	(Italy) Juventus	Washington, D.C.
18:00 UTC-5				Stadium: RFK Stadium
Note: Match cancelled.

July 28, 2012	D.C. United (United States)	1–1	(France) PSG	Washington, D.C.
19:30 UTC-5	De Rosario 33' (pen.)	Report	Ibrahimović 3'	Stadium: RFK Stadium; Attendance: 13,176; Referee: John McCloskey
Note: Replaced Juventus on June 27, 2012.

== Club information ==
=== Roster and staff ===
First team

As of May 9, 2012.

No.	Name	Nationality	Position	Date of birth (age)	Signed from
Goalkeepers
28	Bill Hamid	(United States)	GK	November 25, 1990 (age 35)	The academy
31	Joe Willis	(United States)	GK	August 10, 1988 (age 38)	(United States) University of Denver
50	Andrew Dykstra	(United States)	GK	January 2, 1986 (age 40)	(United States) Charleston Battery
Defenders
3	Robbie Russell	(Ghana)	RB/CB	July 16, 1979 (age 47)	(United States) Real Salt Lake
4	Brandon McDonald	(United States)	CB	January 16, 1986 (age 40)	(United States) San Jose Earthquakes
5	Dejan Jakovic	(Canada)	CB	July 16, 1985 (age 41)	(Serbia) Red Star
15	Ethan White	(United States)	CB	January 1, 1991 (age 35)	(United States) University of Maryland
19	Emiliano Dudar	(Argentina)	CB	January 17, 1982 (age 44)	(Switzerland) Young Boys
21	Daniel Woolard	(United States)	LB	May 22, 1984 (age 42)	(United States) Carolina RailHawks
22	Chris Korb	(United States)	RB/LB	October 8, 1987 (age 39)	(United States) University of Akron
Midfielders
2	Danny Cruz	(United States)	RM	January 3, 1990 (age 36)	(United States) Houston Dynamo
6	Kurt Morsink	(United States)	DM	October 9, 1987 (age 39)	(United States) New York Red Bulls
8	Branko Bošković	(Montenegro)	AM	June 21, 1980 (age 46)	(Austria) Rapid Wien
11	Marcelo Saragosa	(Brazil)	DM	January 22, 1982 (age 44)	(Azerbaijan) Ravan Baku
14	Andy Najar	(Honduras)	RM/RB	March 16, 1993 (age 33)	The academy
17	Conor Shanosky	(United States)	DM/CB	December 13, 1991 (age 34)	The academy
18	Nick DeLeon	(United States)	LM/RM	January 1, 1991 (age 35)	(United States) University of Louisville
20	Stephen King	(United States)	AM	March 6, 1986 (age 40)	(United States) Seattle Sounders FC
23	Perry Kitchen	(United States)	DM/CB/RB	February 29, 1992 (age 34)	(United States) University of Akron
24	Lewis Neal	(England)	LM/LB	April 12, 1981 (age 45)	(United States) Orlando City Soccer Club
Forwards
7	Dwayne De Rosario	(Canada)	ST/AM	May 15, 1978 (age 48)	(United States) New York Red Bulls
9	Hamdi Salihi	(Albania)	ST	January 19, 1984 (age 42)	(Austria) Rapid Wien
13	Chris Pontius	(United States)	ST/LW	May 12, 1987 (age 39)	(United States) UC Santa Barbara
16	Josh Wolff	(United States)	ST	February 25, 1977 (age 49)	(United States) Sporting Kansas City
29	Maicon Santos	(Brazil)	ST	April 18, 1984 (age 42)	(United States) FC Dallas

Reserve team

=== Management ===
Front office and ownership

Position	Staff
President & Chief Executive Officer	Kevin J. Payne
Executive Vice President	Stephen Zack
Senior Vice President, Marketing Communications	Doug Hicks
Chief Financial Officer	Michael Williamson
Vice President, Business Development	Dawn Ridley

Last updated: January 9, 2012
Source: D.C. United Official Website

Coaching staff

Position	Staff
Head Coach	Ben Olsen
Assistant Coaches	Chad Ashton; Sonny Silooy
Goalkeeping Coach	Pat Onstad
General Manager	Dave Kasper
Special Projects Manager	Bryan Namoff
Team Administrator	Francisco Tobar
Equipment Manager	David Brauzer
Head Athletic Trainer	Brian Goodstein
Asst. Athletic Trainer / Asst. Strength Coach	Pete Calabrese
Assistant, Team Operations	Steve Olivarez
Physical Therapist	Gabriel Manoel
Asst. Equipment Manager	Tim Hall

Last updated: January 9, 2012
Source: D.C. United Official Website

== Statistics ==
=== Appearances and goals ===
No.	Pos	Nat	Player	Total		MLS regular season		MLS Cup Playoffs		U.S. Open Cup		Carolina Challenge Cup	
No.	Pos	Nat	Player	Apps	Goals	Apps	Goals	Apps	Goals	Apps	Goals	Apps	Goals
2	MF	(United States) USA	Danny Cruz	18	1	10+6	1	0+0	0	0+0	0	1+1	0
3	DF	(United States) USA	Robbie Russell	23	1	22+0	1	0+0	0	0+0	0	1+0	0
4	DF	(United States) USA	Brandon McDonald	38	2	36+0	2	0+0	0	2+0	0		
5	DF	(Canada) CAN	Dejan Jaković	29	1	27+0	1	0+0	0	1+1	0		
6	MF	(United States) USA	Kurt Morsink	0	0	0+0	0	0+0	0	0+0	0		
7	FW	(Canada) CAN	Dwayne De Rosario	28	7	25+2	7	0+0	0	1+0	0		
8	MF	(Montenegro) MNE	Branko Bošković	31	2	25+5	2	0+1	0	0+0	0		
9	FW	(Albania) ALB	Hamdi Salihi	26	9	20+3	6	1+0	1	2+0	2		
11	MF	(Brazil) BRA	Marcelo Saragosa	22	1	19+1	1	1+0	0	1+0	0		
13	MF	(United States) USA	Chris Pontius	36	12	32+2	12	0+0	0	1+1	0		
14	MF	(Honduras) HON	Andy Najar	29	0	24+2	0	1+0	0	1+1	0		
15	DF	(United States) USA	Ethan White	3	0	0+0	0	1+0	0	0+2	0		
16	FW	(United States) USA	Josh Wolff	11	0	0+9	0	1+0	0	0+1	0		
17	MF	(United States) USA	Conor Shanosky (on loan to Fort Lauderdale Strikers)	2	0	0+0	0	0+0	0	0+2	0		
18	MF	(United States) USA	Nick DeLeon	35	8	31+1	8	0+1	0	1+1	0		
19	DF	(Argentina) ARG	Emiliano Dudar	18	1	14+1	0	1+0	1	1+1	0		
20	GK	(United States) USA	Stephen King	9	0	1+6	0	1+0	0	1+0	0		
21	DF	(United States) USA	Daniel Woolard	23	1	19+2	1	0+0	0	1+1	0		
22	DF	(United States) USA	Chris Korb	31	0	25+3	0	1+0	0	1+1	0		
23	DF	(United States) USA	Perry Kitchen	37	0	27+9	0	0+1	0	0+0	0		
24	MF	(United States) USA	Lewis Neal	23	2	19+3	2	1+0	0	0+0	0		
25	MF	(United States) USA	Lance Rozeboom	2	0	0+0	0	0+0	0	1+1	0		
28	GK	(United States) USA	Bill Hamid	27	0	27+0	0	0+0	0	0+0	0		
29	FW	(Brazil) BRA	Maicon Santos	30	8	25+2	7	1+0	0	1+1	1		
31	GK	(United States) USA	Joe Willis	16	0	2+11	0	1+0	0	2+0	0		
50	GK	(United States) USA	Andrew Dykstra	1	0	0+0	0	0+0	0	0+1	0		

=== Top scorers ===
Rank	Nation	Number	Name	Total	MLS	MLS Cup Playoffs	U.S. Open Cup	Carolina Challenge Cup
1	(United States)	13	Chris Pontius	12	12	0	0	0
2	(Albania)	9	Hamdi Salihi	9	6	0	1	2
3	(Brazil)	29	Maicon Santos	8	7	0	0	1
4	(Canada)	7	Dwayne De Rosario	7	7	0	0	0
4	(United States)	18	Nick DeLeon	7	6	1	0	0
6	(Colombia)	26	Lionard Pajoy	3	3	0	0	0
7	(Montenegro)	8	Branko Boskovic	2	1	1	0	0
7	(United States)	4	Brandon McDonald	2	2	0	0	0
7	(England)	24	Lewis Neal	2	2	0	0	0
7	(Brazil)	11	Marcelo Saragosa	2	1	0	1	0
11	(United States)	2	Danny Cruz	1	1	0	0	0
11	(United States)	3	Robbie Russell	1	1	0	0	0
11	(Canada)	5	Dejan Jaković	1	1	0	0	0
11	(United States)	21	Daniel Woolard	1	1	0	0	0
11	(China)	27	Long Tan	1	1	0	0	0
11	(United States)	14	Josh Wolff	1	0	0	1	0

Updated to match played November 19, 2012
Source: D.C. United

=== Top assists ===
Rank	Nation	Number	Name	Total	MLS	MLS Cup Playoffs	U.S. Open Cup	Carolina Challenge Cup
1	(Canada)	7	Dwayne De Rosario	12	12	0	0	0
2	(Montenegro)	8	Branko Bošković	9	7	0	1	1
3	(United States)	18	Nick DeLeon	5	4	0	1	0
3	(Honduras)	14	Andy Najar	5	4	0	0	1
4	(United States)	4	Brandon McDonald	4	4	0	0	0
4	(United States)	13	Chris Pontius	4	4	0	0	0
5	(United States)	2	Danny Cruz	3	3	0	0	0
5	(United States)	22	Chris Korb	3	3	0	0	0
5	(Brazil)	29	Maicon Santos	3	2	0	1	0
6	(United States)	21	Daniel Woolard	2	2	0	0	0
7	(Brazil)	11	Marcelo Saragosa	1	1	0	0	0
7	(United States)	16	Josh Wolff	1	1	0	0	0
7	(United States)	20	Stephen King	1	1	0	0	0
7	(United States)	23	Perry Kitchen	1	1	0	0	0
7	(England)	24	Lewis Neal	1	1	0	0	0
7	(Colombia)	26	Lionard Pajoy	1	1	0	0	0
7	(United States)	3	Robbie Russell	1	0	1	0	0
7	(United States)	15	Ethan White	1	0	0	0	1

Updated to match played November 10, 2012
Source: D.C. United

=== MLS Player of the Month ===
Month	Player	Link
May	(Canada) Dwayne De Rosario	4G 3A

=== MLS Player of the Week ===
Week	Player	Week's Statline
7	(United States) Chris Pontius	3G (8', 32', 69')
11	(Canada) Dwayne De Rosario	1G (25'), 2G (1', 43')

=== MLS Best XI of the Week ===
Week	Player	Opponent(s)	Link
4	(Brazil) Maicon Santos	FC Dallas	Team of the Week
4	(United States) Nick DeLeon	FC Dallas	Team of the Week
4	(Canada) Dwayne De Rosario	FC Dallas	Team of the Week
4	(United States) Joe Willis	FC Dallas	Team of the Week
6	(United States) Nick DeLeon	New England Revolution	Team of the Week
7	(United States) Chris Pontius	New York Red Bulls	Team of the Week
11	(Canada) Dwayne De Rosario	Toronto FC	Team of the Week
11	(Albania) Hamdi Salihi	Toronto FC	Team of the Week
11	(United States) Ben Olsen	Toronto FC	Team of the Week
17	(United States) Chris Pontius	Montreal Impact	Team of the Week
28	(United States) Chris Pontius	New England Revolution	Team of the Week
29	(United States) Ben Olsen	Philadelphia Union, Chivas USA	Team of the Week
30	(United States) Bill Hamid	Portland Timbers	Team of the Week
32	(United States) Nick DeLeon	Columbus Crew	Team of the Week
32	(Honduras) Andy Najar	Columbus Crew	Team of the Week
32	(United States) Ben Olsen	Columbus Crew	Team of the Week

== Transfers ==
=== In ===
No.	Pos.	Player	Transferred from	Fee/notes	Date	Source
3	DF	(United States) Robbie Russell	(United States) Real Salt Lake	Acquired for 2013 MLS SuperDraft third round pick	November 29, 2011	
18	MF	(United States) Nick DeLeon	(United States) Louisville Cardinals	Selected in the 2012 MLS SuperDraft	January 12, 2012	
	DF	(United States) Chris Rodriguez	(United States) Charlotte 49ers	Selected in the 2012 MLS Supplemental Draft	January 17, 2012	
	MF	(United States) Matt Kuhn	(United States) Drake Bulldogs	Selected in the 2012 MLS Supplemental Draft	January 17, 2012	
29	FW	(Brazil) Maicon Santos	(United States) FC Dallas	Undisclosed	January 18, 2012	
2	MF	(United States) Danny Cruz	(United States) Houston Dynamo	Undisclosed	January 20, 2012	
19	DF	(Argentina) Emiliano Dudar	(Switzerland) Young Boys	Free	January 25, 2012	
9	FW	(Albania) Hamdi Salihi	(Austria) Rapid Wien	Undisclosed	February 2, 2012	
11	MF	(Brazil) Marcelo Saragosa	(Azerbaijan) Ravan Baku	Undisclosed	February 6, 2012	
50	GK	(United States) Andrew Dykstra	(United States) Charleston Battery	Free	February 27, 2012	
25	MF	(United States) Lance Rozeboom	(United States) New Mexico Lobos	Selected in the 2012 MLS Supplemental Draft	March 7, 2012	
24	MF	(England) Lewis Neal	(United States) Orlando City	Free	March 13, 2012	
	FW	(China) Tan Long	(Canada) Vancouver Whitecaps FC	Traded for 2015 MLS Supplemental Draft first round draft pick	June 28, 2012	
6	DF	(United States) Mike Chabala	(United States) Portland Timbers	Traded for 2014 MLS Supplemental Draft first round draft pick	August 19, 2012	
26	FW	(Colombia) Lionard Pajoy	(United States) Philadelphia Union	Traded for Danny Cruz	August 16, 2012	

=== Out ===
No.	Pos.	Player	Transferred to	Fee/notes	Date	Source
24	FW	(United States) Brandon Barklage	(United States) New York Red Bulls	Option declined	November 29, 2011	
4	DF	(United States) Marc Burch	(United States) Seattle Sounders FC	Selected in the MLS Re-Entry Draft	November 29, 2011	
1	GK	(United States) Steve Cronin	None	Retired	November 29, 2011	
18	DF	(United States) Devon McTavish	None	Retired	November 29, 2011	
11	DF	(Zimbabwe) Joseph Ngwenya	(United States) Richmond Kickers	Option declined	November 29, 2011	
25	DF	(United States) Santino Quaranta	(India) Bengal Tuskers	Contract terminated	November 29, 2011	
19	MF	(United States) Clyde Simms	(United States) New England Revolution	Selected in the MLS Re-Entry Draft	November 29, 2011	
12	DF	(United States) Jed Zayner	(United States) San Jose Earthquakes	Option declined	November 29, 2011	
9	FW	(United States) Charlie Davies	(France) Sochaux	Loan expired	December 1, 2011	
11	FW	(United States) Blake Brettschneider	(United States) New England Revolution	Waived	February 3, 2012	
2	MF	(United States) Danny Cruz	(United States) Philadelphia Union	Traded for Lionard Pajoy	August 16, 2012	

=== Loan in ===
No.	Pos.	Player	Loaned from	Start	End	Source
12	MF	(Brazil) Raphael Augusto	(Brazil) Fluminense	July 28, 2012	December 31, 2012	

=== Loan out ===
No.	Pos.	Player	Loaned to	Start	End	Source
17	MF	(United States) Conor Shanosky	(United States) Fort Lauderdale Strikers	March 2, 2012	September 23, 2012	
50	GK	(United States) Andrew Dykstra	(United States) Charleston Battery	April 24, 2012	May 14, 2012	
15	DF	(United States) Ethan White	(United States) Richmond Kickers	June 14, 2012	June 18, 2012	
18	FW	(China) Long Tan	(United States) Richmond Kickers	July 13, 2012	July 14, 2012	

== Allocations ==
=== Allocation ranking ===
D.C. United is in the #7 position in the MLS Allocation Ranking. The allocation ranking is the mechanism used to determine which MLS club has first priority to acquire a U.S. National Team player who signs with MLS after playing abroad, or a former MLS player who returns to the league after having gone to a club abroad for a transfer fee. A ranking can be traded, provided that part of the compensation received in return is another club's ranking.

=== International roster slots ===
D.C. United International slots
Slot	Player	Nationality
1	Dejan Jakovic	Canada
2	Branko Bošković	Montenegro
3	Maicon Santos	Brazil
4	Emiliano Dudar	Argentina
5	Hamdi Salihi	Albania
6	Lewis Neal	England

D.C. United has six international roster slots. Each club in MLS is allocated eight international roster spots, which can be traded. D.C. United traded one slot to Los Angeles Galaxy on February 7, 2011, for use during the 2011 and 2012 seasons and another slot to Portland Timbers on February 6, 2012, for use during the 2012 and 2013 seasons. The remaining roster slots must belong to domestic players. For clubs based in the United States, a domestic player is either a U.S. citizen, a permanent resident (green card holder) or the holder of other special status (e.g., refugee or asylum status).

As of June 28, 2012, United has used all six international roster spots on the following players: Canadian Dejan Jakovic, Montenegrin Branko Bošković, Brazilian Maicon Santos, Argentine Emiliano Dudar, Albanian Hamdi Salihi, and Englishman Lewis Neal.

=== Future draft picks ===
Acquired
Year	Draft	Round	Traded from	Ref.

Traded
Year	Draft	Round	Traded to	Ref.
2013	SuperDraft	Round 2	New England Revolution	
2013	SuperDraft	Round 3	Real Salt Lake	
2014	Supplemental Draft	Round 1	Portland Timbers	
2015	SuperDraft	Round 3	Vancouver Whitecaps FC	

== See also ==
- 2012 Major League Soccer
- 2012 MLS Cup Playoffs
- 2012 MLS Reserve Division
- 2012 U.S. Open Cup
- 2012 D.C. United Women season
