= Hughan =

Hughan is a surname and given name. Notable people with the name include:

== Surname ==
- Arthur Henniker-Hughan (1866–1925), British navy officer and politician
- Jessie Wallace Hughan (1875–1955), American educator, socialist activist, and radical pacifist
- Thomas Hughan (c. 1760–1811), Scottish slave trader, merchant and politician

== Given name ==
- Hughan Gray (born 1987), Jamaican footballer
