= Nick DeLeon =

American soccer player (born 1990)

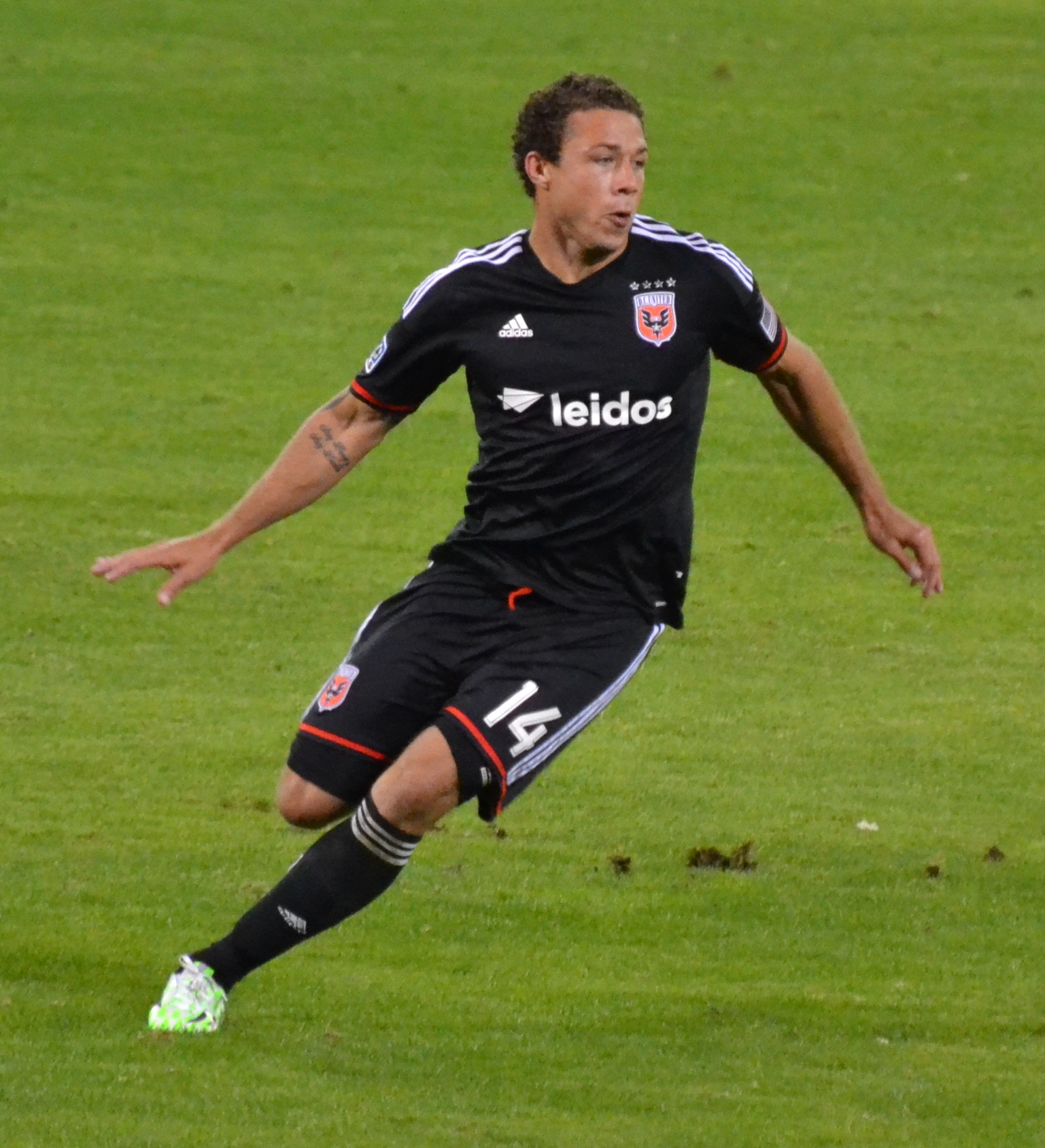
- DeLeon playing for D.C. United in 2014

Personal information
- Full name: Nicholas Lee DeLeon
- Date of birth: July 17, 1990 (age 36)
- Place of birth: Phoenix, Arizona, United States
- Height: 5 ft 10 in (1.78 m)
- Positions: Midfielder; full back

Youth career
- 1998–2009: CISCO Soccer Club

College career
Years	Team	Apps	(Gls)
2008–2009	UNLV Rebels	29	(7)
2010–2011	Louisville Cardinals	46	(14)

Senior career*
Years	Team	Apps	(Gls)
2010	Arizona Sahuaros	0	(0)
2012–2018	D.C. United	180	(13)
2019–2021	Toronto FC	69	(8)
- * Club domestic league appearances and goals as of November 7, 2021

Nicholas Lee DeLeon (born July 17, 1990) is an American professional soccer player. Although he is capable of playing as a full-back, he typically plays as a wide midfielder, working towards the center. He is highly regarded for his work rate and 1-on-1 skills. He also demonstrates an ability to score with both feet.

== Club career ==
=== Youth ===
DeLeon played three years for Thunderbird High School in Phoenix, Arizona from 2004 to 2007. DeLeon started his collegiate career at University of Nevada, Las Vegas in 2008, and led freshmen in appearances with 18, starting in 12, and earned 3 assists in his first year. DeLeon scored two goals and two assists in 12 appearances his sophomore year. In the summer of 2010, DeLeon took part in and scored in the U.S. Open Cup with Phoenix-based NPSL team Arizona Sahuaros.

DeLeon transferred to the University of Louisville for the 2010 season. DeLeon had a successful first season with the Cardinals, starting all 24 games and scoring 8 goals and 3 assists, and was named to the All-Big East first team. The Cardinals won the 2010 Big East Soccer Tournament and advanced to the final of the 2010 College Cup, where they fell 1–0 to the Akron Zips. In DeLeon's senior season at Louisville, he again started every game, scoring 6 goals and 6 assists, and was again named to the All-Big East first team. DeLeon's two goals in the Cardinals' first two games helped them to the quarterfinals of the 2011 College Cup and saw him named to the Cup's All-Tournament team. DeLeon was invited to the 2012 MLS Combine based on his strong collegiate performances.

=== Professional ===
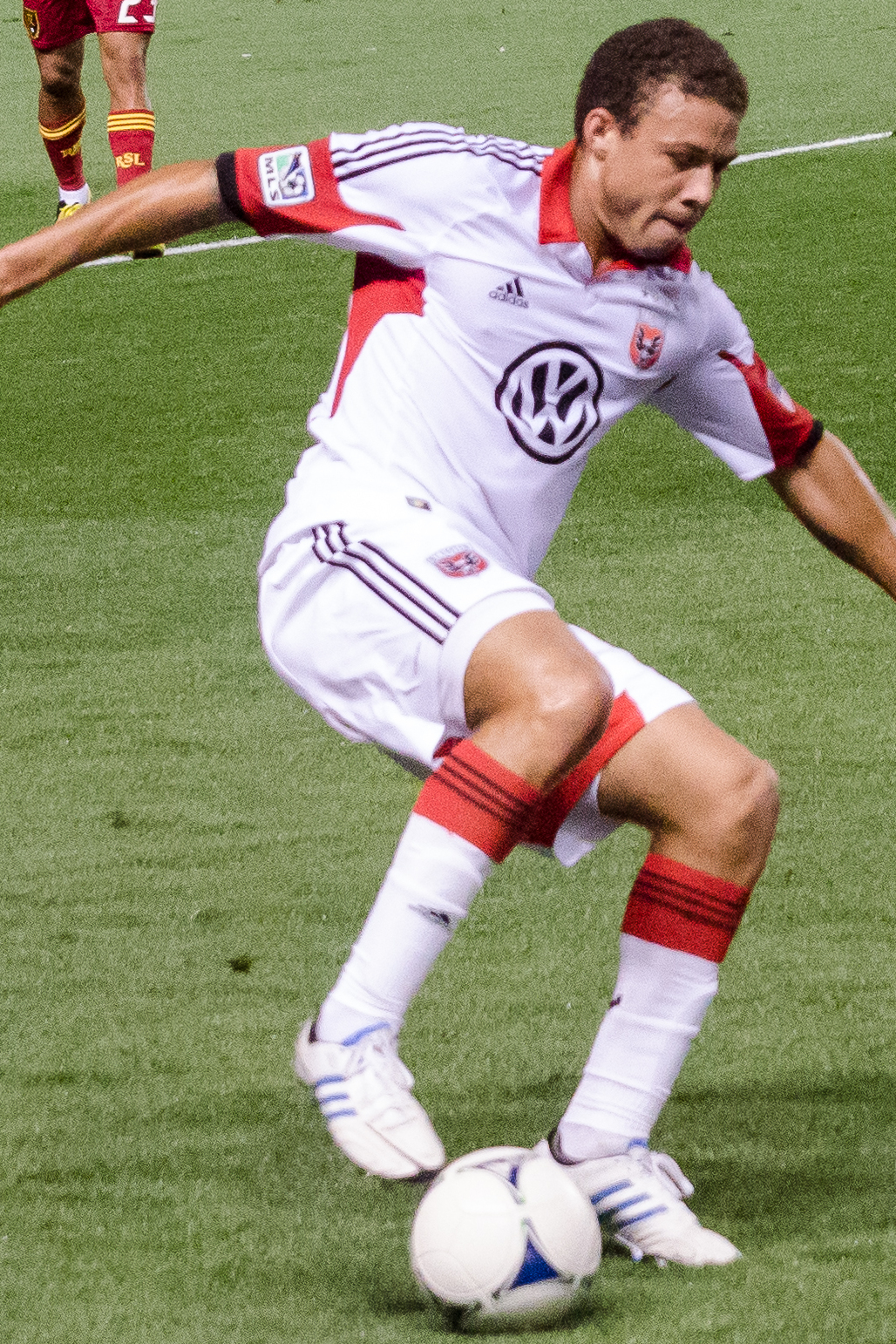
DeLeon playing for DC United in 2012

DeLeon signed with Major League Soccer on December 29, 2011, and was chosen with the 7th overall pick of the 2012 MLS SuperDraft by D.C. United. He made his first appearance for United on March 18, 2012, coming on as a substitute in the second half against the LA Galaxy. He scored D.C.'s only goal in a 3–1 loss, curling a right-footed shot just inside the back post, earning DeLeon a nomination for Goal of the Week. On November 8, DeLeon scored the winning goal in the 88th minute to knock the New York Red Bulls out of the playoffs and to take D.C. United to the Eastern Conference finals, where United were defeated by the Houston Dynamo. DeLeon would feature in 28 games on the season, starting 25, running up a total of six goals and four assists. In the post-season, DeLeon was voted runner-up for the 2012 MLS Rookie of the Year award, losing out to fellow University of Louisville alum Austin Berry of the Chicago Fire. On November 1, 2018, DeLeon scored a volley in the 116th minute of an MLS Playoff game against Columbus Crew. DeLeon eventually missed the decisive penalty as the Crew won 3–2 on PK's.

Following the 2018 season, D.C. declined the 2019 contract option on DeLeon. In December 2018, he was selected by Toronto FC in the 2018 MLS Re-Entry Draft. DeLeon scored his first goal for Toronto FC in the 2019 season opener on March 2, 2019, against Philadelphia Union. He scored a goal against his former club, D.C. United on June 29, 2019. He scored against D.C. United again in the 2019 MLS Cup Playoffs on October 19, 2019. The game ended in a 5–1 win for Deleon's side. On October 30, 2019, Deleon scored the winning goal against Atlanta United FC in a 2–1 win. He departed Toronto FC after the 2021 season.

== International career ==
Born in the United States, DeLeon is also eligible to represent Trinidad and Tobago through his father, a former Trinidadian international. DeLeon was called up for Trinidad and Tobago's qualifying campaign for the 2012 Summer Olympics but declined. In January 2013, DeLeon was called up for Trinidad and Tobago's senior friendly against Peru on February 6, 2013, but once again declined. DeLeon stated his desire to represent the United States internationally but did not eliminate the possibility of representing Trinidad and Tobago in the future. In January 2016, DeLeon's father told Trinidadian media that his son was ready to play for Trinidad and Tobago and was working on acquiring a passport for the country. However, as of October 2021 he remains uncapped.

== Personal life ==
Nick is the son of Trinidadian international and NASL player Leroy DeLeon, who played with the Washington Diplomats in the 1970s.

On April 5, 2011, while attending the University of Louisville, DeLeon was arrested along with two members of the Louisville diving team after being found with a large amount of marijuana and drug paraphernalia. Each were charged with one count of drug trafficking and one count of possession.

DeLeon married his longtime girlfriend Jordan Trimble on December 14, 2013. They have two children, a girl, born August 10, 2016, and a son born September 2017.

In March 2021, DeLeon stated his opposition to modern medicine by telling Toronto Sun reporter Steve Buffery "I’ve never had vaccines. I don’t get the flu shot. I don’t get any of that. I don’t take medicine. I don’t take prescription crap. Any of that." He also stated that he will never receive the COVID-19 vaccine. He went on to state that the numbers from the COVID-19 pandemic, that at the time of the interview had killed 2.75 million people worldwide, don't matter to him "It doesn’t matter to me. I don’t cower at (COVID-19) numbers, all that b.s. I don’t care. I don’t have to follow the flow of what everybody’s doing. Nah. I run my race, period.".

== Career statistics ==
=== Club ===
As of match played November 21, 2021

Appearances and goals by club, season and competition
Club	Season	League			Playoffs (Note: All appearances in the MLS Cup Playoffs)		Cup (Note: Includes U.S. Open Cup and Canadian Championship)		Continental		Other		Total	
Club	Season	Division	Apps	Goals	Apps	Goals	Apps	Goals	Apps	Goals	Apps	Goals	Apps	Goals
Arizona Sahuaros	2010	NPSL	–		–		2	1	–		–		2	1
D.C. United	2012	MLS	28	6	4	2	2	0	–		–		34	8
D.C. United	2013	MLS	25	2	–		5	1	–		–		30	3
D.C. United	2014	MLS	32	2	2	1	0	0	0	0	–		34	3
D.C. United	2015	MLS	29	2	3	0	1	1	2	0	–		35	3
D.C. United	2016	MLS	32	1	1	0	0	0	2	0	–		35	1
D.C. United	2017	MLS	19	0	–		0	0	–		–		19	0
D.C. United	2018	MLS	15	0	1	1	0	0	–		–		16	1
D.C. United	Total		180	13	11	4	8	2	4	0	–		203	19
Toronto FC	2019	MLS	32	6	4	2	2	2	1	0	–		39	10
Toronto FC	2020	MLS	21 (Note: Includes three appearances in the MLS is Back Tournament group stage)	1	1	0	0	0	–		1 (Note: Appearance in the MLS is Back Tournament knockout stage)	0	23	1
Toronto FC	2021	MLS	16	1	—		2	0	3	0	–		21	1
Toronto FC	Total		69	8	5	2	4	2	4	0	1	0	83	12
Career total			249	21	16	6	14	5	8	0	1	0	286	31

== Honors ==
D.C. United

- U.S. Open Cup: 2013
