= Bill Hamid =

American soccer player (born 1990)

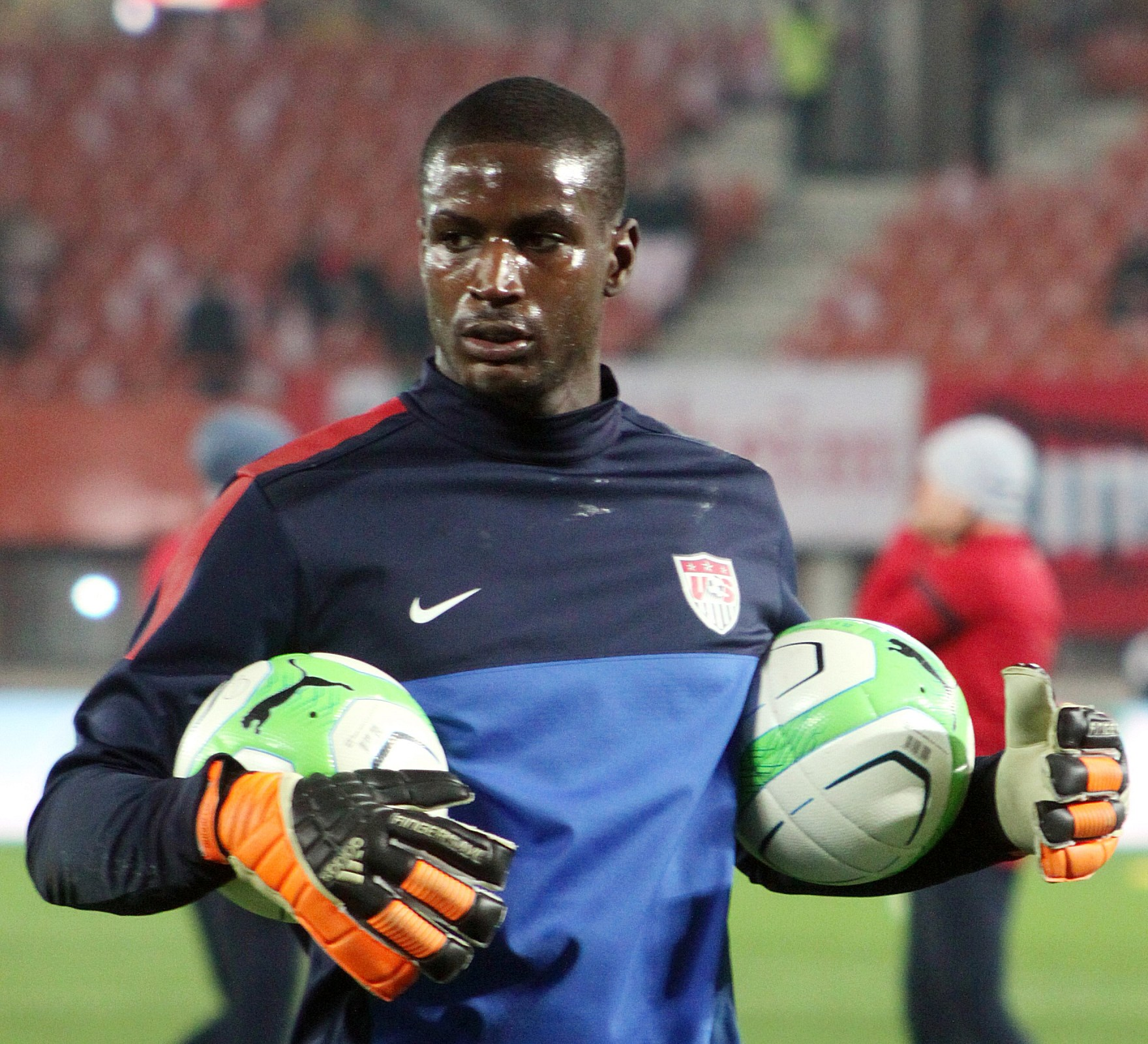
- Hamid with the United States in 2013

Personal information
- Full name: Abdul Bilal Hamid
- Date of birth: November 25, 1990 (age 35)
- Place of birth: Annandale, Virginia, United States
- Height: 6 ft 3 in (1.91 m)
- Position: Goalkeeper

Team information
- Current team: Corpus Christi FC
- Number: 28

Youth career
- 2003–2007: Premier AC
- 2007–2009: D.C. United

Senior career*
Years	Team	Apps	(Gls)
2009–2017	D.C. United	184	(0)
2018–2020	Midtjylland	1	(0)
2018–2019	→ D.C. United (loan)	47	(0)
2020–2022	D.C. United	48	(0)
2023	Memphis 901	10	(0)
2024	Northern Virginia FC	0	(0)
2024	Virginia Dream	5	(0)
2024	Maryland Bobcats	3	(0)
2025	Miami FC	15	(0)
2025	Tampa Bay Rowdies	23	(0)
2026–	Corpus Christi FC	0	(0)

International career^{‡}
2008	United States U20	2	(0)
2012	United States U23	4	(0)
2012–2020	United States	8	(0)

Managerial career
- 2024: Virginia Dream (player-coach)
- 2026: Corpus Christi FC (player-coach)
Medal record
Representing United States
Winner	CONCACAF Gold Cup	2013
Winner	CONCACAF Gold Cup	2017
Men's Soccer
- * Club domestic league appearances and goals as of October 31, 2026 ‡ National team caps and goals as of December 9, 2020

Abdul Bilal "Bill" Hamid (/həˈmiːd/ hə-MEED; born November 25, 1990) is an American professional soccer player who plays as a goalkeeper for USL League One club Corpus Christi FC.

Born in Annandale, Virginia, Hamid was the first D.C. United Academy player to sign for the first team in September 2009. He made his professional debut in May 2010 as the youngest goalkeeper to win a game in Major League Soccer history. He helped the team to victory in the 2013 U.S. Open Cup and received the MLS Goalkeeper of the Year Award in 2014. In January 2018 he joined FC Midtjylland, winning the Danish Superliga in his first season. He returned to D.C. United in August, initially on loan, and totaled 296 appearances (232 league). He was released at the end of the 2022 season, with franchise records of 89 shutouts and 976 saves.

Hamid made his senior debut for the United States national team in January 2012, playing eight games up to December 2020. He was part of their teams that won the CONCACAF Gold Cup in 2013 and 2017.

== Club career ==
=== D.C. United ===
Hamid became the first D.C. United Academy player to sign with the first team on September 2, 2009. Prior to signing with D.C. United, he was linked with a move to Celtic, until work permit issues derailed the move.

He made his professional debut on May 5, 2010, in a game against the Kansas City Wizards. With this win, Hamid became the youngest goalkeeper in MLS history, at 19 years 161 days, to win a regular season game, besting Tim Howard's record by four days. Hamid started 28 of United's 34 games during the 2011 season. He retained his starting spot during the 2012 season, making appearances in 27 matches.

After the 2011 regular season, Hamid began a 10-day trial on October 29, 2011, with English Premier League club West Bromwich Albion. He stayed with the club until November 7.

In 2012, Hamid earned a record 88 saves in arguably his best season in MLS to date. Despite Hamid being sent off with a red card during the 2012 playoffs in a match against the New York Red Bulls, D.C. United was able to come away with a win and advance to the next round. Hamid, emotional after seeing the win, was videotaped shirtless screaming "You can't hold us back" while pounding his chest. The phrase became a rallying cry for D.C. United fans who organized a display featuring the quote. Although D.C. United failed to defeat their next challenger, the Houston Dynamo, the phrase stuck with the fans. For the 2013 season, the D.C. United fan group Screaming Eagles designed a scarf with the quote and presented Hamid with a free one. D.C. United won the 2013 Lamar Hunt U.S. Open Cup, the 100th edition of the competition. Hamid played the final, a 1–0 win at Real Salt Lake, having been deputized by Joe Willis in previous rounds. In 2014, D.C. United finished top of the Eastern Conference in the regular season, having finished bottom the year before. Hamid won the MLS Goalkeeper of the Year Award.

=== Midtjylland ===
At the end of the 2017 season, Hamid's contract with D.C. United expired as the two sides failed to negotiate a new contract. On October 25, 2017, it was announced that Hamid had signed with Danish Superliga club Midtjylland valid from January 1, 2018. He was back-up to Jesper Hansen in his first season, making only one league appearance on April 22 in a 3–3 draw at Aalborg, in which he made a mistake from a corner kick to give the opponents a 3–2 lead. Midtjylland finished the campaign as league champions.

=== Return to D.C. United ===
Hamid rejoined D.C. United on August 8, 2018, on a year-and-a-half loan. On December 9, 2019, this was made into a three-year permanent transfer for a reported transfer fee of $750,000.

Hamid played 10 games in the 2022 Major League Soccer season, which ended for him with a hand operation in June. During the season, D.C. United signed goalkeepers Rafael Romo, Luis Zamudio and David Ochoa, followed by Tyler Miller at the end of the year. Hamid was allowed to enter free agency, with franchise records of 89 shutouts and 976 saves.

=== Later career ===
On March 20, 2023, Hamid joined USL Championship club Memphis 901 for the 2023 season. Hamid and Memphis mutually agreed to terminate his contract early on August 18, 2023.

Hamid appeared for Northern Virginia FC in their 2024 U.S. Open Cup match, a 3–2 loss to Carolina Core.

On April 2, 2024, Virginia Dream announced that Hamid would be joining the club as a player and goalkeeping coach for their 2024 United Premier Soccer League season.

On September 3, 2024, Maryland Bobcats announced that Hamid would be joining the club for the remainder of their 2024 season. (Pending National Independent Soccer Association and United States Soccer Federation Approval).

In February 2025, Hamid joined USL Championship club Miami FC. The move brought him closer to his younger sister Jasmine Hamid, a player for Fort Lauderdale United in the USL Super League.

In August 2025, Hamid moved to the Tampa Bay Rowdies as the Rowdies transferred goalkeeper Nicolás Campisi to Miami FC.

In March 2026, Hamid was hired as a joint assistant manager/goalkeeping coach by USL League One club Corpus Christi FC. On July 17, following the unavailability of goalkeeper James Talbot, the club added Hamid to their active roster. He had previously appeared on the bench in a 1–1 draw against One Knoxville SC in the USL Cup on July 11.

== International career ==
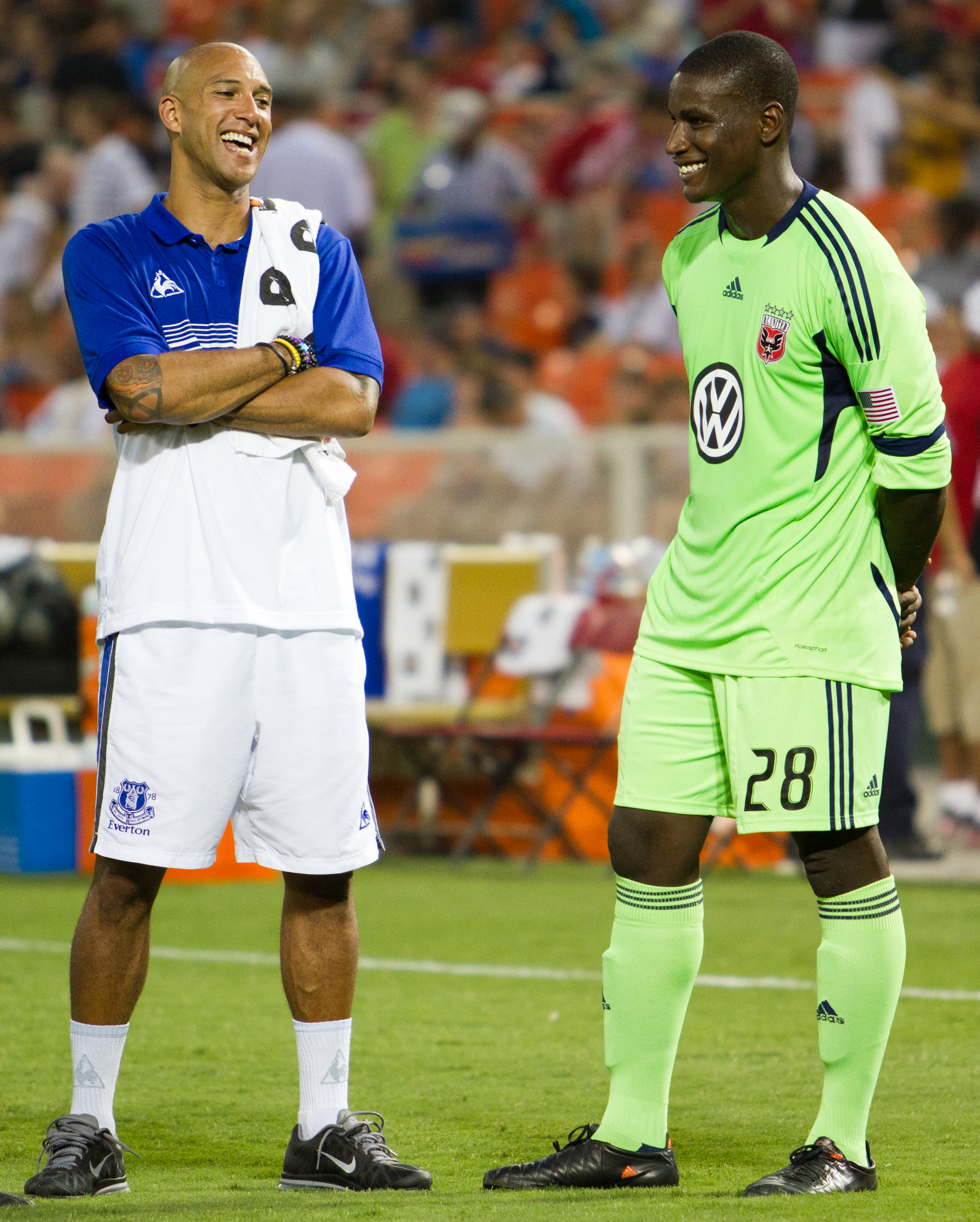
Hamid speaks with Everton and USMNT goalkeeper Tim Howard before a friendly match on July 23, 2011, at RFK Stadium

Hamid played for the United States at under-18 and under-20 level, and in October 2009 he trained with the senior team. Hamid made his international debut for U.S. national team on January 21, 2012, keeping a shutout as his team beat Venezuela 1–0 in an exhibition game at the University of Phoenix Stadium. He became the ninth goalkeeper not to concede on his international debut for the United States.

Coach Jürgen Klinsmann named Hamid in his roster for the 2013 CONCACAF Gold Cup, which the United States won. He did not make his second appearance until November 18, 2014, in a 4–1 exhibition loss to the Republic of Ireland in Dublin.

Hamid was again called up for the 2017 CONCACAF Gold Cup, receiving a second winner's medal. On July 15, he played his first competitive match for the United States at FirstEnergy Stadium in Cleveland, Ohio and kept a shutout in a 3–0 win that made his team top their group.

On December 30, 2019, Hamid was called up to Gregg Berhalter's 25-man roster for a friendly against Costa Rica on February 1, 2020. He played this game for his first international game in over 18 months, a 1–0 win in which he replaced Sean Johnson for the final 14 minutes. On December 9 he played his last of eight internationals, a 6–0 win over El Salvador in Fort Lauderdale.

== Personal life ==
Hamid's parents are from Sierra Leone. He was raised Muslim and observes fasting during the Islamic month of Ramadan. He graduated from DeMatha Catholic High School in Hyattsville, Maryland in 2006.

== Career statistics ==
=== Club ===
As of match played May 28, 2022

Appearances and goals by club, season and competition
Club	Season	League			National cup (Note: Includes U.S. Open Cup, Danish Cup)		Continental		Other		Total	
Club	Season	Division	Apps	Goals	Apps	Goals	Apps	Goals	Apps	Goals	Apps	Goals
D.C. United	2009	MLS	0	0	0	0	—		—		0	0
D.C. United	2010	MLS	8	0	3	0	—		—		11	0
D.C. United	2011	MLS	28	0	0	0	—		—		28	0
D.C. United	2012	MLS	24	0	1	0	—		3 (Note: Appearance(s) in MLS Cup playoffs)	0	28	0
D.C. United	2013	MLS	25	0	1	0	—		—		26	0
D.C. United	2014	MLS	30	0	0	0	1 (Note: Appearance in CONCACAF Champions League)	0	2	0	33	0
D.C. United	2015	MLS	25	0	0	0	1	0	3	0	29	0
D.C. United	2016	MLS	20	0	0	0	—		1	0	21	0
D.C. United	2017	MLS	24	0	0	0	—		—		24	0
D.C. United	Total		184	0	5	0	2	0	9	0	200	0
Midtjylland	2017–18	Danish Superliga	1	0	2	0	—		—		3	0
D.C. United (loan)	2018	MLS	14	0	—		—		1	0	15	0
D.C. United (loan)	2019	MLS	33	0	—		—		1	0	34	0
D.C. United (loan)	Total		47	0	0	0	—		2	0	49	0
D.C. United	2020	MLS	17 (Note: Includes three appearances in MLS is Back Tournament group stage)	0	—		—		—		17	0
D.C. United	2021	MLS	21	0	—		—		—		21	0
D.C. United	2022	MLS	10	0	0	0	—		—		10	0
D.C. United	Total		48	0	0	0	—		0	0	48	0
Career total			280	0	7	0	2	0	11	0	300	0

=== International ===
As of match played December 10, 2020

United States
Year	Apps	Goals
2012	1	0
2013	0	0
2014	1	0
2015	0	0
2016	0	0
2017	2	0
2018	2	0
2019	0	0
2020	2	0
Total	8	0

== Honors ==
D.C. United

- U.S. Open Cup: 2013

Midtjylland

- Danish Superliga: 2017–18

United States

- CONCACAF Gold Cup: 2013, 2017

Individual

- MLS Goalkeeper of the Year: 2014
