= Victor Muñoz (footballer, born 1990) =

Spanish footballer

Personal information
- Full name: Victor Muñoz Martiañez
- Date of birth: 25 July 1990 (age 36)
- Place of birth: Madrid, Spain
- Height: 1.72 m (5 ft 8 in)
- Position: Midfielder

Youth career
- 2000–2009: Real Madrid
- 2009–2010: Celta de Vigo

College career
Years	Team	Apps	(Gls)
2010	Iona Gaels	17	(4)
2011–2013	UCLA Bruins	55	(7)

Senior career*
Years	Team	Apps	(Gls)
2014	Sporting Kansas City	4	(0)
2015	Arizona United	10	(0)
2016	SS Reyes	32	(4)
- * Club domestic league appearances and goals as of 29 May 2016

Victor Muñoz Martiañez (born 25 July 1990) is a Spanish former professional footballer who played as a midfielder.

== Career ==
=== Early career ===
Muñoz spent nine years with Real Madrid's academy, spending time with Real Madrid C. At eighteen years old, Muñoz rejected a three-year contract from the club in order to focus on his education. He spent one season playing for Celta de Vigo, before moving to the US.

Muñoz moved to the United States and spent 2010 playing college soccer at Iona College, before transferring to UCLA in 2011.

=== Sporting Kansas City ===
On 16 January 2014 Muñoz was selected in the second round of the 2014 MLS SuperDraft by D.C. United becoming the first Spanish player to ever being drafted from college in the history of the MLS. However, Muñoz's rights were traded to Sporting Kansas City on 1 April 2014.

Muñoz made his professional debut on 18 June 2014 in a US Open Cup fixture against Minnesota United.

=== Arizona United ===
Muñoz signed with USL club Arizona United on 3 March 2015. After one season in Arizona, he left the club and went back to Spain.

=== San Sebastián de los Reyes ===
On 27 July 2015, Muñoz returned to his home country and joined UD San Sebastián de los Reyes. He contributed with 32 appearances and four goals during the campaign, as his side achieved promotion to Segunda División B.
