= Emiliano Dudar =

Argentine footballer (born 1981)

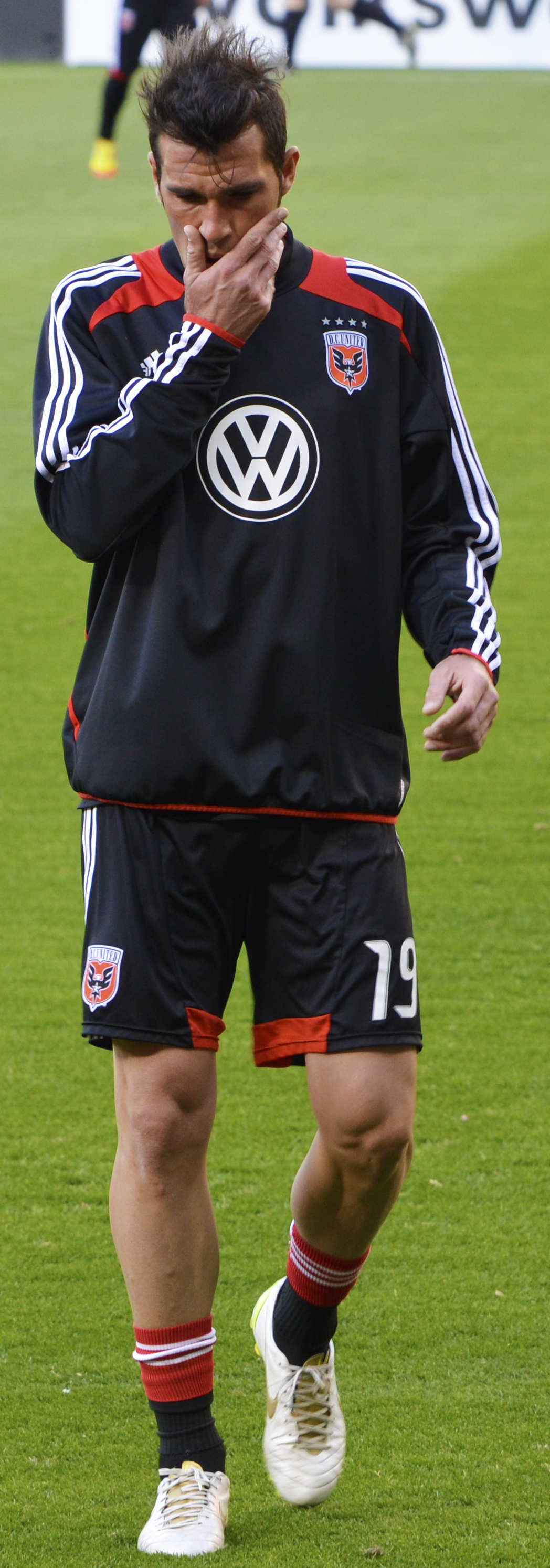

Personal information
- Full name: Emiliano Ariel Dudar
- Date of birth: 12 August 1981 (age 45)
- Place of birth: Buenos Aires, Argentina
- Height: 1.93 m (6 ft 4 in)
- Position: Central defender

Youth career
- 1997–1998: Vélez Sársfield

Senior career*
Years	Team	Apps	(Gls)
1999–2003	Velez Sarsfield	63	(5)
2003–2004	→ Independiente (loan)	19	(1)
2004	→ Banfield (loan)	2	(0)
2004	→ Caracas (loan)		
2005	→ Libertad (loan)		
2005	Carabobo		
2005	Tigre	15	(0)
2006–2007	Vasco da Gama	19	(0)
2007–2008	Chiasso	14	(3)
2008	Olimpo de Bahía Blanca	15	(0)
2009	Bellinzona	16	(2)
2009–2012	Young Boys	48	(2)
2012	D.C. United	11	(0)
2013	Chiasso	14	(3)
2013–2015	Sion	0	(0)
2015–2016	Deportivo Merlo	4	(0)
Total		240	(16)
- * Club domestic league appearances and goals as of 12 April 2015

Emiliano Ariel Dudar (born 12 August 1981) is a retired Argentine central defender.

== Career ==
Born in Buenos Aires, Dudar began his career in the youth ranks of Velez Sarsfield and made his First Division debut in 2000. During his debut season he was named Rookie of the Year by the Asociación del Fútbol Argentino. In over four years at the Buenos Aires club, he made 63 appearances and scored 5 goals. For the 2003–04 season he was loaned out to Independiente and was a regular starter appearing in 19 matches and scoring one goal. For the next few years he was loaned out to Banfield, Caracas, and Libertad. In 2005, he signed with Carabobo in Venezuela's top flight and remained at the club for one year before returning to Argentina. He signed with Tigre for the second half of the 2005 season and appeared in 15 games. His play with Tigre drew the attention of top Brazilian club Vasco da Gama. He joined Vasco in 2006 and appeared in 34 official matches for the club.

In 2007, he left for Europe, joining FC Chiasso of the Swiss Challenge League and appeared in 14 matches scoring 3 goals. He returned to Argentina in 2008 playing for Olimpo de Bahía Blanca. His prior experience in Switzerland led to his signing with Swiss side AC Bellinzona in the second half of the 2008–09 campaign, where he played in 16 matches and scored two goals. The following season, he joined BSC Young Boys. In his first year with Young Boys he was named the Swiss Golden Player as the league's top defender. He started in 31 matches that season scoring one goal. Dudar's second season with Young Boys was cut short as he was placed in a medically induced coma after suffering a severe head injury on 12 September 2010, when he accidentally clashed heads with teammate François Affolter. He was successfully woken up a day later.

He signed with D.C. United of Major League Soccer on 25 January 2012.

After one season with DC, Dudar returned to former club FC Chiasso of the Swiss Challenge League on 1 February 2013.

Half a year later, on 18 July 2013, he moved to league rivals FC Sion. He left Sion on January 20, 2014.

After taking a break on his career, Dudar signed with Deportivo Merlo on February 12, 2015. Dudar retired in 2016.

== Honours ==
- Closing Championship: 1998
- Recopa: 1997
- Venezuelan Championship: 2004
