= Chris Korb =

American soccer player (born 1987)

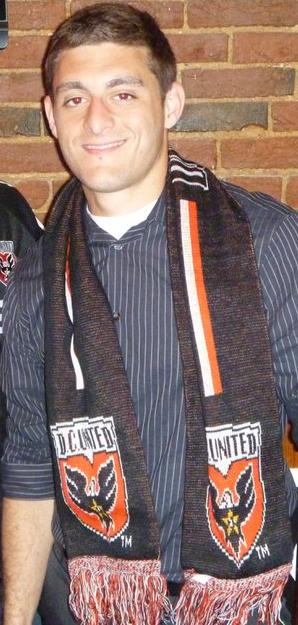
- Korb at the 2011 MLS SuperDraft

Personal information
- Full name: Christopher Korb
- Date of birth: October 8, 1987 (age 39)
- Place of birth: Gates Mills, Ohio, United States
- Height: 5 ft 9 in (1.75 m)
- Position: Defender

Youth career
- 1995–2006: Internationals SC

College career
Years	Team	Apps	(Gls)
2006	Xavier Musketeers	18	(0)
2007–2010	Akron Zips	73	(2)

Senior career*
Years	Team	Apps	(Gls)
2006–2009	Cleveland Internationals	32	(1)
2011–2017	D.C. United	121	(0)
2017	→ Richmond Kickers (loan)	1	(0)
Total		154	(1)
- * Club domestic league appearances and goals

Christopher Korb (born October 8, 1987) is an American former professional soccer player who played as a defender for D.C. United in Major League Soccer.

== Early life ==
Korb was born on October 8, 1987, in Ohio to Rozann and Kenneth Korb. His dad coached his first soccer team.

== Career ==
=== Youth ===
While playing for the University School, Korb was named Team MVP in 2005 and All-Ohio honoree and also served as team captain. He began his collegiate career at Xavier University in 2006 and appeared in 18 games with 18 starts and 2 assists. He transferred to the University of Akron following the 2006–07 season and sat out for a portion of the 2007–08 season with a quad injury. As a redshirt sophomore, he played all 23 games and scored his first career goal against Hartwick College during the MAC semifinals in November. As a junior, he started all 25 games and was named to the Mid-American Conference First Team. He played his final year of soccer at University of Akron in 2010, was named to the All-MAC Second Team, and started on the team that won the 2010 Men's Division 1 National Championship .

During his college years, Korb also played four campaigns with the USL Premier Development League for the Cleveland Internationals.

=== Professional ===
Korb was chosen in the second round, 31st overall, of the 2011 MLS SuperDraft by D.C. United. He signed a contract with the club on March 1, 2011, and made his professional debut on March 26 in a 2–1 loss to New England Revolution

He played a pivotal role and started every game through the 2013 Lamar Hunt Open Cup Tournament which D.C. United won

He suffered a season-ending ACL tear in his right knee against New York City FC on August 13, 2015. He experienced further complications and underwent additional surgeries, leading him to miss the entire 2016 season. DC United declined his option contract but extended his existing contract following several months of recuperation and rehabilitation. On May 4, 2017, he signed a multiyear contract with DC. He was loaned out to the Richmond Kickers of the United Soccer League and played his first game after several years of setbacks on May 18 against FC Cincinnati; he recorded one assist. His resumed play for DC United shortly after and played 16 games (starting 13) in the season. He was eligible for the 2017 MLS Re-Entry Draft but retired ahead of the 2018 season.

== Honors ==
University of Akron

- NCAA Men's Division I Soccer Championship: 2010

D.C. United

- Lamar Hunt U.S. Open Cup: 2013
