= Hughan Gray =

Jamaican footballer (born 1987)

Personal information
- Full name: Hughan Edwardo Gray
- Date of birth: 25 March 1987 (age 39)
- Position: Right back

Team information
- Current team: Waterhouse

Senior career*
Years	Team	Apps	(Gls)
2008–2012	Sporting Central Academy		
2012–	Waterhouse	78	(8)

International career^{‡}
2014–	Jamaica	4	(0)
- * Club domestic league appearances and goals as of 8 June 2014 ‡ National team caps and goals as of 8 June 2014

Hughan Edwardo Gray (born 25 March 1987) is a Jamaican international footballer who plays for Waterhouse, as a right back.

== Career ==
Gray has played club football for Sporting Central Academy and Waterhouse.

He made his international debut for Jamaica in 2014.
