= 2015 D.C. United season =

D.C. United
2015 season
- General manager: Dave Kasper
- Head coach: Ben Olsen
- Stadium: RFK Stadium
- MLS: Conference: 4th Overall: 8th
- MLS Cup Playoffs: Conference Semifinals
- U.S. Open Cup: Fifth round
- CONCACAF Champions League (14–15): Quarterfinals
- CONCACAF Champions League (15–16): Quarterfinals
- Atlantic Cup: Runner-up
- Top goalscorer: League: Chris Rolfe (6); All: Jairo Arrieta (9)
- Highest home attendance: 21,517 ( vs. NYCFC)
- Lowest home attendance: League: 11,218 (June 3 vs. Chicago); All: 8,137 (Mar. 4 vs. Alajuelense)
- Average home league attendance: League: 14,458; All: 13,932
Home colors	Away colors

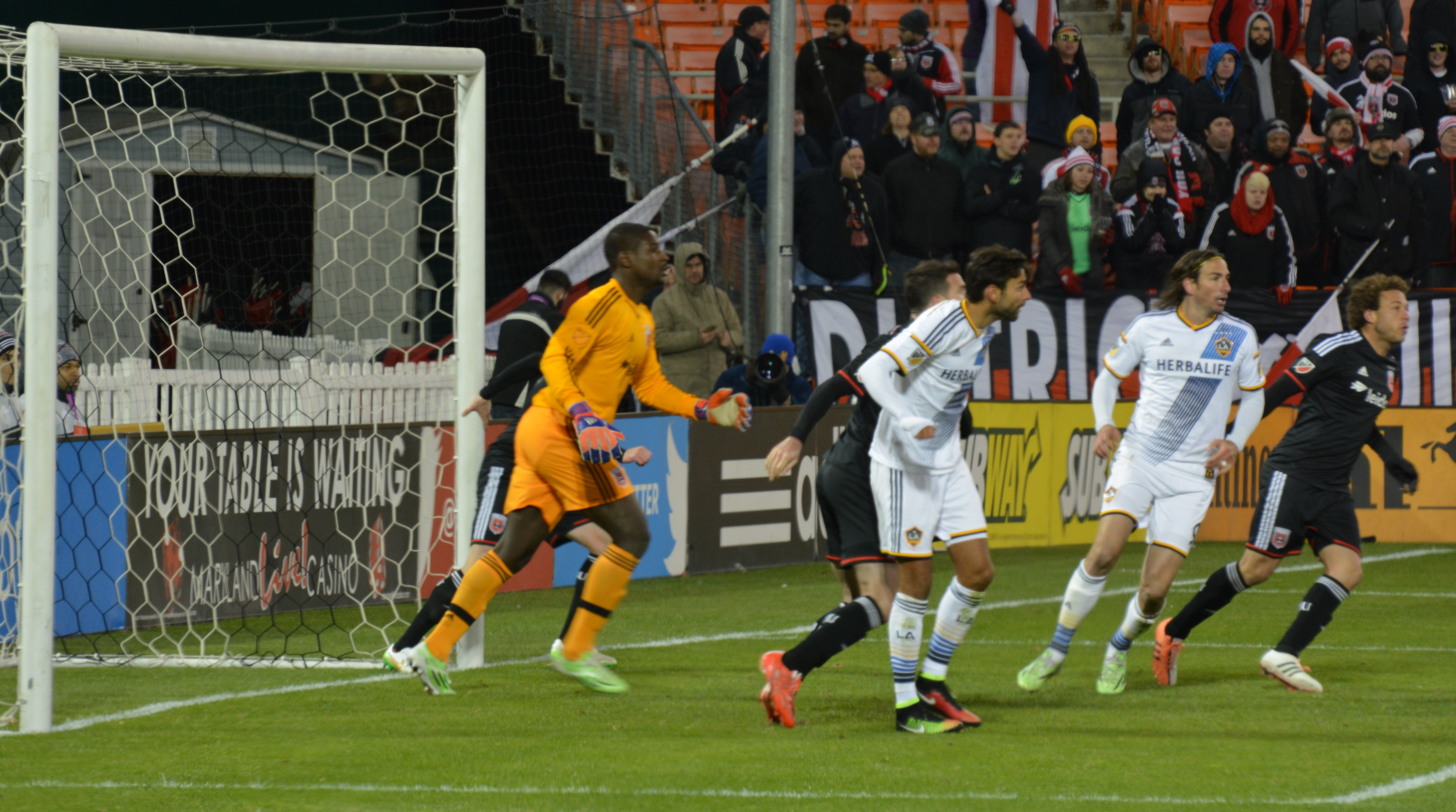

The 2015 D.C. United season was the club's twentieth season of existence, and their twentieth in Major League Soccer, the top tier of the American soccer pyramid. The club entered the season as the defending Eastern Conference regular season champions.

Outside of MLS regular season play, the club participated in the 2015 U.S. Open Cup, as well as the knockout stages of the 2014–15 CONCACAF Champions League and group stages of the 2015–16 CONCACAF Champions League.

== Background ==
=== Pre-season ===
==== January ====
D.C. United began the season in 2015, after a successful 2014 campaign, in which D.C. United went undefeated during the 2014-15 CONCACAF Champions League group play. The team, seeking to maintain its success, thought to keep much of the team the same. In the final month of 2014, the team traded its late-season 2014 acquisition, reserve fullback/midfielder Samuel Inkoom, along with back-up goalkeeper Joe Willis, to the Houston Dynamo, in exchange for the MLS rights to Andrew Driver, whose contract had not been renewed by Houston. The main purpose of the trade was to remove an international player, Inkoom, from the roster, so the team could protect all of the major 2014 players in the 2014 MLS Expansion Draft. In the expansion draft, the team did lose veteran reserve midfielder Lewis Neal along with Thomas McNamara, who had just been acquired by the team in the 2014 MLS Dispersal Draft that followed the dissolution of Chivas USA. The team added depth in the 2015 MLS SuperDraft, selecting a projected winger, Miguel Aguilar, along with a central midfielder from the nearby University of Maryland, Dan Metzger. Several days before the draft, the team also signed veteran Finnish international, Markus Halsti, from the Swedish side Malmö FF. With Malmö, Halsti had played defensive midfield in recent years, after having spent the early years in his career playing as a defender. On the day before the SuperDraft, the team also traded one of its unused international player roster slots to the Columbus Crew in exchange for forward Jairo Arrieta.

Ben Olsen, who was awarded league honors as the 2014 MLS Coach of the Year, continued to manage the side along with General Manager Dave Kasper. The team lost two 2014 assistant coaches, goalkeepers coach Preston Burpo and staff assistant Enzo Concina. Prior to the Superdraft, the team prepared to hire longtime MLS goalkeeper, former league All-Star and Maryland native Zach Thornton to replace Burpo. Several D.C. United players were invited to participate in a January training camp for the United States men's national soccer team, including Perry Kitchen and Steve Birnbaum. 2014 MLS Goalkeeper of the Year Bill Hamid had to decline because of a lingering shoulder injury.

The big offseason news for the team, however, did not involve players or the coaching staff. At the end of 2014, the team culminated years of searching for a site to construct a new stadium. The team's long efforts were rewarded in December 2014, with the passage of legislation by the D.C. City Council that committed the city to spend as much as $150 million to acquire and prepare the necessary land at Buzzard Point, which would be leased to the team for at least 30 years. The team was prepared to build a stadium on the site for another $150 million. The bill was signed into law by the outgoing Mayor Vincent C. Gray, in his final days in office. D.C. United hoped to move into its new 'soccer-specific' stadium for the 2017 season, and prepared to play the team's final 2 seasons in RFK Stadium.

==== February ====
D.C. United acquired Michael Farfan with its MLS Allocation signing spot and soon after released Driver and Metzger from the team. The team travelled to Austin, Texas where the Austin Aztex hosted a friendly 4-team tournament, the ATX Pro Challenge. D.C. managed to win this tournament by beating the host team with a pair of early goals in the semifinals, and then beating runner-up FC Dallas in the finals. The team won a bronze armadillo trophy for their efforts.

After the tourney, David Estrada was released from the team and undrafted goalkeeper Travis Worra was signed to provide depth at the position after Willis' departure. The team travelled to Costa Rica to fight Alajuelense in the quarterfinals of the CCL. Bill Hamid struggled with a back issue and stayed home while backup Andrew Dykstra was given the starting job. Unfortunately, several errors by Dykstra and the defense led D.C. United to a horrendous 2–5 defeat.

==== March ====
Despite a great effort to dig themselves out of a three-goal deficit, a lack of successful finishes and an accidental Own Goal by Chris Korb meant D.C. United would be knocked out of the CCL on a 4–6 aggregate score. The match was also notable for the referee handing out a combined nine yellow cards to both sides.

=== Regular season ===
After the MLS and the MLS Players Union managed to sign a new CBA, the team successfully opened the 2015 MLS season with a 1–0 win at home against the Montreal Impact. Fabian Espindola, Eddie Johnson and Luis Silva were all unable to play in the match, heavily draining DC's offense. The newly added Jairo Arrieta started at forward alongside a healthy Chris Pontius and scored the first goal of the season for the team. Following a bye week, DC United traveled to New Jersey to fight the rival New York Red Bulls. Unfortunately, an anemic offense and poor marking by the DC backline led to a dispiriting 2-0 defeat.

DC returned home to fight the defending MLS Champions, the LA Galaxy, in RFK. Sophomore center back Steve Birnbaum landed awkwardly on his ankle and had to be taken off the field in the fifth minute of play as Kofi Opare got his first league cap in a DC United uniform. Just as it appeared the game would end in a scoreless draw, at the very last minute of the match, Nick DeLeon broke free down the right wing and sent in a cross to Pontius, who fought off his own defender to head the ball past the keeper for a 1–0 victory.

==== April ====
A similar scenario would unfold in the very next match against Orlando City SC. Orlando had an advantage in ball possession and shots on goal, but Hamid's excellent saves would earn him another clean sheet. Silva, who finally returned from his preseason injury as a substitute, bent a direct free kick into the opposing net in stoppage time and secured a 1–0 victory for DC. When DC United returned home following the Orlando match, press reports emerged that Eddie Johnson's career was in jeopardy because of a heart defect. Although the team continued official radio silence on the issue, the Washington Post eventually reported that Johnson would no longer continue to be paid by the team. Outstanding issues remained to be negotiated before this would be officially confirmed. These issues included whether DC would be allowed to sign a replacement using the salary cap space budgeted to Johnson's contract.

On the pitch, things continued fairly brightly for the team, which finished the month atop both the Eastern Conference and overall MLS standings based on most points per game. Despite squandering second-half leads at home against both the New York Red Bulls and the Houston Dynamo, United did not lose in April. Against New York, DC, took a 2–0 lead on a pair of goals by Perry Kitchen. The Red Bulls came back to get a point, culminating the comeback as Lloyd Sam knocked in a rebound when Hamid could not control a Sacha Kljestan free kick. In the next match, against the Dynamo, United's Chris Rolfe scored on a free kick from almost the same spot that the Red Bulls took their game-tying free-kick in the previous match. Once again, though, the defense failed to prevent a late goal on a tap-in following a rebound allowed by the DC goalie, This time it was Andrew Dykstra who was in the net, unable to prevent the tying goal. After the successive disappointing home draws, DC United finished the month with a surprising win in Vancouver, a first ever for the franchise. The Whitecaps opened the scoring in that match with a goal on their first foray forward, but DC responded with a goal by Bobby Boswell to knot the score. Just before halftime, Fabian Espindola, drew a foul along with a second yellow card for Whitecaps player, Matias Laba. Espindola was making his MLS season debut after serving a 6-game suspension. Playing with a man-advantage, United took the lead in the second half on a goal by Chris Rolfe. Defending the lead was made more challenging when goalie Andrew Dykstra injured his ankle and had to be subbed off. Dykstra was playing because Bill Hamid was back in Washington, missing his second straight match, nursing a thigh injury. Rookie Travis Worra came on to make his MLS debut, manning the goal as United held on for a 2–1 win.

==== May ====
The winning ways continued for United with three home games to start the month. In the first, United defeated the Columbus Crew 2–0, with two first half goals. The first came on a shot by Espindola that finished off a play that began with a 40-yard run by Rolfe, who got the assist on a perfectly weighted pass through the Crew defense. Espindola had the assist on the second goal with a corner kick to the far post when Sean Franklin volleyed for the goal. Back in goal for this game, Hamid earned yet another shutout. United's impressive home unbeaten streak continued a week later, with a 1–1 draw against Sporting Kansas City. A long pass from Perry Kitchen found Pontius, who chested the ball into the path of Jairo Arrieta, and Arrieta's shot found the back of the net. United gave away the lead about a minute later, just before halftime, as a cross by Sporting's Roger Espinoza found the foot of Dom Dwyer for the tying goal. Four nights later, United again defended Fortress RFK, against MLS debutantes, Orlando City SC. Missing star striker Espindola due to injury, United started slowly and Orlando capitalized as rookie Cyle Larin, the first pick in the 2015 MLS Superdraft, pounced on a loose ball in the box and beat goalie Bill Hamid. However, United was able to rally with two goals over the final 20 minutes to come away with a 2–1 win and regain the lead in the Supporters Shield race. A free kick by Taylor Kemp found the head of Opare, who was starting in place of the injured Birnbaum. Rolfe got the game-winner, stretching his leg out to get on the end of a cross by Arrieta, and tipping it in for the goal that sent the crowd into a frenzy.

An eight-game unbeaten streak came to a gut-wrenching end in Philadelphia. Despite playing an unfamiliar midfield that included Markus Halsti and Miguel Aguilar getting their first starts ever for United, and Michael Farfan in his second start, United seemed headed to an earning a point with a scoreless draw against the Philadelphia Union. After using all three substitutions, United was suddenly shorthanded in the game's final minutes, when Silva left the match because of a hamstring injury. In the 3rd minute of stoppage time, Zach Pfeffer got the winning goal for the Union. Traveling to Foxboro the next weekend to play the New England Revolution, United seemed headed to a dispiriting second straight loss, trailing 1-0 at halftime. When two players were shown red cards early in the second half, there was reason to expect United to rally and take the 3 points. Nonetheless, the team struggled to generate good chances. Desperate to find the tying goal, Coach Olsen even turned to a new player, Facundo Coria, who had been signed only the week before. Coria reward the move, sending a pass to Kemp in the left corner, and Kemp's cross found the foot of the streaking Arrieta, who scored the equalizing goal in a 1–1 draw that kept United on top of the Eastern Conference. United finished a hugely challenging road trip, playing the 3rd straight road game over an 8-day span, against the Portland Timbers. Because of injuries and tired legs, Olsen rolled out a decidedly second-choice lineup that featured a midfield consisting of Halsti, Aguilar, Jared Jeffrey and Luke Mishu. These players had a combined two starts in prior matches. Jeffrey was making only his second appearance in 2015 for United, and Mishu was not only starting for the first time, but making his first ever appearance in an MLS match. The makeshift lineup played surprisingly well, especially in the second half, but an early turnover by Kemp led to the game's only goal, as United left Portland empty-handed, with a 1–0 loss.

United closed out the month with another uplifting comeback in RFK. A 2–1 win over the Union extended United's home unbeaten streak to a team-record tying 19 games. Despite falling behind in the first 5 minutes for the second time in 4 nights, United was able to knot the score on a header by Pontius just before halftime, on another great cross into the box by Kemp. The winning goal came on a penalty kick taken by Rolfe in the 85th minute, leaving United where it began the month, on top of the Eastern Conference.

==== June ====
The first match for United in June saw yet another roaring comeback for the home side, setting a new team record by stretching the home unbeaten streak to 20 games. The Chicago Fire faced another patchwork lineup from United. Birnbaum made his first start ever at left back with both Kemp and Korb out for injuries. Silva (who had not played since the injury he suffered in Philadelphia), Pontius and Hamid were also late scratches, and Rolfe was out on a game suspension for a kick to the chest of an opposing player that was caught on video during the prior game against the Union. Goalie Dykstra saved a first half penalty kick, but the Fire went out ahead a minute later on a goal by David Accam. Halftime substitution Fabian Espindola engineered a comeback win in his comeback from injury. Arrieta got the tying goal on a header off a corner by Espindola. The go-ahead goal was also scored by Arrieta, and the final goal in a 2–1 United win came on a cross by Espindola that was redirected into the net by Conor Doyle, for his first goal of the season.

Two unlikely streaks ended 3 nights later at RFK Stadium. DC United had surrendered the first goal in each of the preceding six games, but that streak ended when an early goal by Steve Birnbaum gave DC United a 1–0 lead against Toronto FC. However, Toronto's highly regarded Designated Player Sebastian Giovinco tallied a first half goal to knot up the score. In the 83rd minute, Giovinco again beat United's second-string goalkeeper, Dykstra, this time from distance, to earn all 3 points for the visiting team. The home defeat was the first for United since dropping a game to the Sounders nearly a year earlier in June 2014. United's home unbeaten streak ended at 20 games, but the team still held on to first place in the Eastern Conference. A week later, the team traveled to Orlando where they fell by a 1–0 scoreline, marking the first time in 2015 that D.C. United lost two consecutive games. The decisive blow came on a penalty kick that followed a very controversial call against Taylor Kemp. Bill Hamid was actually able to deny the PK shot by the legendary former FIFA Player of the Year Kaka, but Kaka was able to pounce on the loose ball and knock it in for the decisive score.

Despite the team's sudden struggles on the field, fans got great news about the franchise's future stadium. Speculation had arisen in early June about meetings with Virginia officials about a possible move to Loudoun County, but the team and the District of Columbia government soon announced that they had agreed to the final terms on the proposed deal for a stadium in the District's Buzzard Point neighborhood, which was to be completed for the 2018 season.

United made their debut in the 2015 U.S. Open Cup three nights after the loss in Orlando, with the team's first ever trip to the Steel City to face the Pittsburgh Riverhounds. Pittsburgh proved to be a tough opponent, taking their MLS opposition into extra time, but D.C. United prevailed with two goals in the overtime period, to win 3–1, on goals by Coria, Opare and Deleon. United returned to RFK four nights later, where they rediscovered their home field winning ways, with yet another striking comeback, to defeat the New England Revolution, by a now very familiar 2–1 score. United fell behind in the first half, when one-time D.C. United striker, Charlie Davies put the visitors in front in the 10th minute. The home team struggled for much of the game, but salvaged a win on 2 second-half goals by Chris Rolfe. Espindola had the assist on the first goal, and Rolfe's game-winner came on a penalty kick. Fixture congestion forced Coach Ben Olsen to use a decidedly second-choice lineup on a midweek trip to Chicago, but the visiting team came away with a surprising 1–0 victory. The game-winner was scored in the 73rd minute, when Conor Doyle struck an absolute cannon of a shot that was probably the team's most impressive goal of the year to that point. United remained on the road with a trip to Toronto at the end of that week. The teams played to a 0-0 scoreless draw in very adverse weather conditions, with rain and very heavy winds. Despite being outplayed, United nearly won the game in the last minute, but Jairo Arrieta's bid for Goal of the Year, a bicycle attempt, was frantically tipped over the bar by Toronto FC goalie, Chris Konopka.

The draw in Toronto extended the team's Eastern Conference lead to 11 points, though United had played more games than any other Eastern Conference team. The team also led the Supporters Shield race by 3 points, but the team below them in the table, Vancouver Whitecaps FC held 2 games in hand. United closed out June with another U.S. Open Cup match, at Philadelphia. The continued fixture congestion meant coach Olsen continued with his rotation and trotted out a nearly fully second choice lineup, with only one regular, defender Steve Birnbaum. Despite the disparity in lineup strength, United struck first. Shortly after Philadelphia Union striker C.J. Sapong was shown a red card, United exploited the man advantage with Arrieta scoring on a deflected cross from rookie Miguel Aguilar. Though they were down a man, the Union soon dominated much of the ensuing play, and won the game on two second half goals, eliminating D.C. from the 2015 Open Cup competition.

==== July ====
Given the team's recent offensive struggles, United fans might have thought they caught a break on the timing of a cross-country trip to face Seattle Sounders FC. The Sounders were playing without stars Clint Dempsey and Obafemi Martins, but United were soon without their starting forwards, in fairly short order, too. Once again, Luis Silva had to leave a game because of muscle injury, this time in the 5th minute. About 20 minutes later, the team was also down a man, after Espindola was shown a straight red card, for a retaliatory elbow. Despite conceding a man advantage, United held strong until a cannon shot Goal-of-the-Week game-winner off the foot of fullback Tyrone Mears in the 88th minute, against back-up netminder, Dykstra. Despite the loss, United remained atop the Supporters Shield standings, just 3 points ahead of the Sounders. United also had a two-week break to nurse a number of injured players to health in advance of a trip to Dallas. The injured list included Silva, Pontius, Franklin, Farfan and Hamid. The news was especially disappointing regarding Hamid, who was leading the league in several categories, despite battling a few injuries. It was announced that Hamid had undergone surgeries on his knee and hand, and would miss another 4–6 weeks. 2 days before the Dallas game, DC United also announced the trade of Luis Silva to Real Salt Lake in exchange for the Costa Rican striker Alvaro Saborio. While Saborio's addition seemed promising for a team desperate to find a goal-scorer, he could not yet join his new club, because Costa Rica was still involved in the 2015 CONCACAF Gold Cup. United's match against FC Dallas followed a troubling pattern that was becoming all-too familiar for United. Playing without the suspended Espindola in addition to all the missing, injured players, the DC side had little possession or attack, leaving the defense and goalie Andrew Dykstra under regular pressure. The United dam finally broke in the 73rd minute with a goal by Kellyn Acosta. United seemingly had managed to claim a draw and a point a few minutes later when Taylor Kemp's attempted cross to Arrieta was knocked into the Dallas net by an FC Dallas defender. However, once again, United's stout defense folded in the final minutes, allowing a stoppage-time winner by Fabian Castillo.

In United's next match, home cooking seemed to make all the difference, as the team won 3–2 on their return to RFK for United's first home match in 5 weeks. Playing at home in front of over 19,000 fans was probably a boost to the team, but an even bigger boost might have been the sight of the team's new striker tandem of Espindola and Saborio. The game started horribly for the home side as the Philadelphia Union scored in the first and fourth minute to take what might have seemed a commanding 2–0 lead. United began to claw their way back into the game as Saborio scored on his United debut, with a 37th minute volley of a Korb cross. The game was tied midway through the second half when Nick DeLeon finished a rebound of an Espindola shot. D.C. United finally went ahead on an Espindola header, with Chris Korb getting his second assist of the match. DeLeon's goal was his first in over a year in a regular season match.

==== August ====
August began explosively for D.C. United, with United defeating visitors Real Salt Lake in a wild 6–4 shooting gallery of a game. As they did the previous weekend at home, United surrendered an extremely early goal, this time in the second minute. Once again, United also soon gave up another goal, falling behind 2–0 before rallying to victory. Rolfe scored unassisted from about 7 yards before halftime. Chris Rolfe tied the score in the second half, on a penalty kick that set off an incredible spree of goals. Five minutes after Rolfe's penalty kick evened the score, Taylor Kemp put the home team in front with a prodigious one-time strike on a loose ball from about 25 yards. The visitors evened the score only 3 minutes later with a header for goal on a free kick taken by Javier Morales. The tie score lasted about a minute, as Fabian Espindola was credited with a goal as he stretched to try and connect with a loose rebound, following a shot by Alvaro Saborio. RSL defender Justen Glad attempted to clear the loose ball off the line, but his attempted clearance hit Espindola's outstretched leg and the ball crossed the line before the defense could react. Once again, United failed to protect the lead, as RSL's Morales again picked apart the defense and earned his second assist within 6 minutes. This time, the tie score lasted for 11 minutes as Kemp served in a cross after a short corner kick, with Perry Kitchen getting on the end of the cross, heading it for the game-winning goal, in the 79th minute. Six minutes later, Nick DeLeon knifed through the RSL defense and blasted a long-range shot for an unassisted goal, capping off the 6–4 win. The six goals scored by United were the most the team had scored since a game in 2004, tying the team's all-time record mark. The combined 10 goals were also the most in any MLS game since 2004, a total that had been exceeded only once in league history. The win put D.C. United back on top of the Supporters Shield standings. Several teams held games in hand and the chance to catch United in that race, but only FC Dallas had earned more points per game played.

United's next match was on the road, against Montreal Impact, and the game could not have been more different than the nearly record-setting 6-4 shootout in United's prior game at home against RSL. The surprising, quick return from injury by goalie Bill Hamid and the sprained knee injury suffered by Fabian Espindola during training the day before the match virtually guaranteed that United would play a cautious, defensive-minded game. Statistics from the game bore that out, as United was outshot 25–1 by the home team, and possession was more than 2–1 in the Impact's favor. Amazingly though, United emerged with a 1–0 victory, thanks to strong goalkeeping and a first-half goal by Rolfe that finished off a play assisted by Arrieta's high pressure. Arrieta forced a turnover by the Montreal defense and directed the ball to Rolfe who scored what proved to be the game-winner on United's only shot of the game. United became the first team ever to win an MLS match having recorded only one shot all game.

The road trip continued with a midweek at Yankee Stadium, United's first match there and first ever match against NYCFC. As in Montreal, United capitalized on first half defensive error, this time by Italian footballing legend Andrea Pirlo, to take a first-half lead. Rolfe intercepted a pass by Pirlo, raced toward goal and found Saborio in front of goal, waiting to finish. However, United turned in one of its poorest 45 minutes of soccer in the second half, surrendering 3 goals, despite a pair of spectacular saves by Hamid, and United's 3-game winning streak came to a crashing end. United not only lost the game, but also lost Korb to a season-ending ACL knee injury. The next 3 matches for United saw Olsen go to a tried-and-true rotation. United opened up its 2015-16 CONCACAF Champions League campaign in Panama, as a squad of reserves weathered consistent pressure by Arabe Unido to emerge with a 1–0 win on a late goal by Miguel Aguilar. The goal was Aguilar's first professional goal, coming off a spectacular no-look back-heel pass by Michael Farfan. The team returned home for an MLS match with San Jose Earthquakes, and the first team's struggles continued in a 2–0 loss, played without star goalie Hamid, whose post-surgical knee kept him out of the lineup. Hamid and the other regulars were not needed in the next game, a CONCACAF Champions League match @ RFK against a Jamaican side that was still in preseason form. United defeated Montego Bay United F.C. 3–0, on goals by Aguilar, Opare and Doyle, and two assists for Farfan.

As the team closed out August, United continued to struggle mightily. Bill Hamid was back in goal as the team made a trip to the New York Red Bulls home field. Without Espindola though, United's attack remained absolutely toothless. NYRB dominated the midfield, perhaps in part because United was playing without Arnaud, who had suffered a concussion against San Jose. Hamid made some pivotal saves early on, but the floodgates eventually opened as the Red Bulls repeatedly sliced through the United defence, utterly dominating the contest which finished 3–0 in favour of NYRB. The loss left United clinging to a 2-point lead in the Eastern Conference, but NYRB held 3 games in hand.

==== September ====
September began with a familiar feel for D.C. United fans. After almost a two-week break that saw the Red Bulls pass United in the standings and seize first place in the Eastern Conference, D.C. United traveled to Denver to face Colorado Rapids. Even with Espindola back in the lineup, United's offense continued to struggle to string together any passes or to generate scoring chances. The Rapids went out to a first half lead when defender Bobby Burling capitalized on a poor clearance by Saborio with a shot that sneaked past Hamid. United managed to rescue a point and snap their 3-game MLS losing streak when Steve Birnbaum finished off a free kick play with a header for a late goal that gave United a 1–1 draw. The result drew United into a numerical tie for first place, but the Red Bulls had played 3 fewer games. Perhaps more importantly, the result in Colorado left United one point of ahead of Columbus Crew SC, with the two teams scheduled to face each other the following weekend in Washington, D.C. If the first team continued to struggle in MLS play, the reserves continued United's good fortune and winning streak in CONCACAF Champions League play. United won its seventh straight group play match over two years, with a 2–0 home-field win over Arabe Unido. Conor Doyle got United on the board in the first minute off an assist from Pontius, and Jeffrey doubled the lead later in the match with a header off a corner kick taken by Coria. The 2–0 clinched first place in the group, sending United through once more to the knockout stages to be played in 2016.

Even a return to RFK Stadium was not enough to cure whatever had been ailing United over the last 2 or 3 months of league play. United fell behind 2–0 against Columbus, but an attempt at a late rally came up short. A penalty kick by Rolfe put United on the scoreboard. Later, Saborio appeared to have tied the score in the 84th minute, off a through pass by Pontius, but the Costa Rican was controversially ruled offside. The result vaulted the Crew to the top of the standings in the Eastern Conference, while United slipped to 4th place. With dreams of MLS hardware slipping away, D.C. United still had top position in CONCACAF Champions League group play, which the team locked down in their final group match of 2015, a 3–3 draw in Jamaica, against Montego Bay United. The Jamaican side jumped out to an early lead when a quick restart caught out a really makeshift D.C. defence, that included Aguilar making his first start as a fullback, and Jalen Robinson making his first start as a center back. That goal was Montego Bay's first ever tally in CCL play. The home side extended the lead 3 minutes later and took what appeared to be a commanding 3-0 lead early in the second half on a penalty kick, after a phantom foul call against midfielder Jared Jeffrey. D.C. however rallied, with goals by Arrieta and Opare, and earned a draw and a point, when Michael Farfan collected a loose ball deep into stoppage time and aimed his shot into the top corner of the goal. The draw was the first CCL group match that D.C. United didn't win over the last two entries into CONCACAF play, but it did extend their CCL group play unbeaten streak to 8 games and left the team with 10 points, waiting to learn their seeding and knockout round opponent when Champions League play resumes in 2016.

Needing only one win to clinch a playoff spot, D.C. United's five-game MLS winless streak stretched to six games when the Montreal Impact's new star addition, Didier Drogba scored twice early in the first half, and United's anemic attack failed to answer. The loss left United only 3 points ahead of the Impact, who still held the final playoff slot, but also having played two fewer games than D.C. Toronto FC held the 5th slot, 2 points behind D.C. Orlando City SC remained outside of the playoff seedings, in seventh place, 7 points behind D.C., with 3 games remaining for both teams.

==== October ====
New York City FC made their first trip to RFK Stadium, and the debutante side proved to be the tonic that D.C. United needed to break their spirit-crushing winless streak, which had begun at NYCFC's home field seven games earlier. When the game began, it seemed that United's losing ways were destined to continue. At the 45-second mark, Frank Lampard followed up the rebound of a David Villa shot, and gave the visitors a very early 1-0 lead. It was not even the first time this season that United had fallen behind in the first minute, but that knowledge was probably little comfort. Over the next 70 minutes, both teams squandered chances, but D.C. finally broke through when Espindola scored off of a rebound that came when NYCFC goalie Josh Saunders made a diving stop on a long-range strike by Chris Pontius. In stoppage time, Pontius was dragged down making a long run, setting up a free kick for the home team. Espindola's service found its way to substitute Saborio, after a misplay by a NYCFC defender. Saborio delivered with a memorable game-winner for D.C. The 2–1 victory, D.C. United's first ever win over NYCFC, not only ended almost two months of frustration for the team, it also clinched a playoff spot for the team. This would be the first time since 2006 and 2007 that United would qualify for the playoffs in each of two consecutive seasons.

D.C. United's sudden turn in fortunes continued in the team's final home regular-season match, against cellar-dwelling Chicago Fire. United broke through late in the first half, when Pontius won a race, beating two defenders and the Fire's goalie, Jon Busch to the ball and then rounding the goalie and slotting home the first goal. Midway through the second half, Boswell scored with a header on a corner kick taken by Espindola. A few minutes later, Espindola got his own goal, with an assist to DeLeon, when a sharply taken shot was deflected just inside the near post. A 4-0 scoreline was completed when a deflected shot came to Saborio in the 6-yard box, and the Costa Rican striker's shot beat the Fire 'keeper. The four-goal margin was the team's largest margin of victory since August 2011. The team would close out the regular season in Columbus, part of MLS' first Decision Day. Going into this final day, United held a one-point lead over Columbus for second place in the Eastern Conference, but four teams would be playing with a chance at claiming second place and a bye through the first round of MLS playoffs. That prize would depend on the results in Columbus and in a match being played at the same time between visiting Montreal and host Toronto. As United geared to play the MLS regular season finale, CONCACAF group play concluded. Thanks to a goal surrendered by the Los Angeles Galaxy on the last kick of their game in Guatemala, D.C. United would carry the #2 seed into the CONCACAF quarterfinals, matching them against the #7 seed, Queretaro F.C. in early 2016.

The regular season concluded with the match in Columbus, and the result matched the all-time worst in United's team history. The United attack hardly ever threatened, but it was shoddy work by the back line that really did in the team, as a 5-0 loss dropped the team into 4th place. That left United as host for a midweek 'play-in' match at home against a New England Revolution team that finished the season with a convincing 3-1 win at NYCFC. On a rainy day in the D.C. area, one of the smallest crowds of the year turned out to watch what proved to be one of the most entertaining games in the MLS season. Typical of the 2015 edition of the team, D.C. United fell behind in the first 15 minutes, but it was hard to fault the quality of a spectacular bicycle goal by New England's Juan Agudelo. Following the goal, the Revolution continued to press but Hamid was able to keep United in the match with some big saves. United leveled the score on a free kick in the 45th minute, as Pontius scored on a header set-up by Espindola's service. Pontius would have to leave the game in the second half, due to hamstring tightness. The D.C. team missed a chance to go ahead in the 75th minute, when Rolfe failed to convert a penalty kick, striking the inside of the post. Rolfe, however, got redemption, scoring in the 83rd minute, finishing off a cutback centering pass from Espindola, DeLeon was also credited with an assist for his nifty back-heel that set-up Espindola's run to the end line. Another spectacular save by Hamid denied a header bid by Revolution's Jermaine Jones in the late-going. The game ended on a controversial note, as Jermaine Jones was shown a red card for grabbing the referee while protesting the decision not to award a penalty kick for an apparent handball against United defender Sean Franklin in the 92nd minute. United had led the league with 8 comeback victories during the regular season, so the comeback win was a fitting way to kick off the 2015 MLS Cup Playoffs.

In the conference semifinal series, United would face their arch-rival, the New York Red Bulls. With the first game at home, United still had to overcome the sudden loss of 2 starters—Pontius to a hamstring injury, and Boswell, who was given a one-game suspension for an off-the-ball incident during the Revolution match. The team was also without Arnaud, who hadn't played in over two months, suffering the lingering effects of a concussion, and Jeffrey, who had suffered facial fractures in training a couple of weeks earlier.

==== November ====
The semifinal series was very typical of the way D.C United played throughout the second half of the season. The attack, such as it was, generated a handful of chances at best, and United became the first team in league history to fail to record a shot on goal as the home team in a playoff match. The passing accuracy was the 3rd worst for any MLS team in any game since 2010. The Red Bulls dominated possession and finally broke through in the second half as one-time United player Dax McCarty headed home the winner in a 1-0 defeat for United. The return match didn't go much better for United. Again, the Red Bulls dominated possession, but thanks to some big saves by Hamid, United still had a chance to try and knot the series as the game drifted into stoppage time. The Red Bulls, however, would finish off United's 2015 season, with a counter-attack goal in stoppage time, scored by Bradley Wright-Phillips, giving NYRB a 2-0 aggregate series win.

With the disappointing second half of the season, it was no surprise that DC United didn't take home any pos-season awards, in contrast to the 2014 season. Bill Hamid finished 3rd in voting for Goalkeeper of the Year, despite finishing first in voting among MLS club management. Although his save percentage made him the league leader, presumably the amount of time he missed for injuries played a factor in the voting, The team went into the offseason with a plan to keep the core together, announcing new deals for Saborio, Rolfe, Boswell and DeLeon, while discussions continued with Kitchen.

==== December ====
As the 2015 MLS season wound up, word emerged that DC United was completing a pair of trades. The player with the longest tenure with the club, the oft-injured and highly compensated Chris Pontius, was sent to the Philadelphia Union, in exchange for allocation money. To fill Pontius' slot, United sent allocation money to the Seattle Sounders in exchange for Lamar Neagle.

== Non-competitive ==
=== Preseason ===
January 30	Orlando City SC	1–1	D.C. United	Bradenton, Florida
7:00p.m. EST	Rivas 67'	Report	Pontius 14'	Stadium: IMG Academy

February 3	D.C. United	0–0	Jönköpings Södra IF	Bradenton, Florida
1:00p.m. EST	Arnaud (yellow card) 39'; Metzger (yellow card) 58', (red card)	Report	(yellow card) 34'	Stadium: IMG Academy

February 6	D.C. United	0–1	Malmö FF	Bradenton, Florida
12:00p.m. EST	Driver (yellow card) 65'; Arrieta (yellow card) 88'		Berget 45'	Stadium: IMG Academy

February 20	FC Dallas	3–1	D.C. United	Frisco, Texas
	Michel (red card) 23'; Hollingshead 27'; Pérez (yellow card) 24'; Zimmerman (yellow card) 52'; Castillo 79'; Akindele 88' (pen.)	Report	Arnaud (yellow card) 56'; Arrieta (yellow card) 61' (goal) 62'; Espíndola (yellow card) 78'	Stadium: Toyota Stadium; Referee: Armando Villarreal

==== ATX Pro Challenge ====
February 13 Semifinals	Austin Aztex	0–2	D.C. United	Austin, Texas
21:00 EST			Opare (yellow card) 4'; Aguilar 9'; Doyle 16'; Arnaud (yellow card) 85'	Stadium: Myers Stadium

February 15 Final	FC Dallas	0–1	D.C. United	Austin, Texas
14:15 EDT			Arnaud (yellow card) 13'; Rolfe 54'; Trialist (yellow card) 90'	Stadium: Myers Stadium

== Competitions ==
=== Major League Soccer ===
==== Overall MLS Table ====
Pos	Team	Pld	W	L	T	GF	GA	GD	Pts	Qualification
6	Seattle Sounders FC	34	15	13	6	44	36	+8	51	
7	Montreal Impact	34	15	13	6	48	44	+4	51	
8	D.C. United	34	15	13	6	43	45	−2	51	
9	LA Galaxy	34	14	11	9	56	46	+10	51	
10	Sporting Kansas City	34	14	11	9	48	45	+3	51	CONCACAF Champions League

Source: MLS
Rules for classification: 1) points; 2) total wins; 3) total goal differential; 4) total goals scored

==== Eastern Conference Table ====
Pos	Team	Pld	W	L	T	GF	GA	GD	Pts	Qualification
2	Columbus Crew	34	15	11	8	58	53	+5	53	MLS Cup Conference Semifinals
3	Montreal Impact	34	15	13	6	48	44	+4	51	MLS Cup Knockout Round
4	D.C. United	34	15	13	6	43	45	−2	51	MLS Cup Knockout Round
5	New England Revolution	34	14	12	8	48	47	+1	50	MLS Cup Knockout Round
6	Toronto FC	34	15	15	4	58	58	0	49	MLS Cup Knockout Round

Source: MLS

==== Results summary ====
Overall								Home						Away					
Pld	W	D	L	GF	GA	GD	Pts	W	D	L	GF	GA	GD	W	D	L	GF	GA	GD
25	13	5	7	34	26	+8	44	9	3	1	27	16	+11	4	2	6	7	10	−3

Last updated: June 29, 2015.
Source: Match Results

==== Results by round ====
Round	1	2	3	4	5	6	7	8	9	10	11	12	13	14	15	16	17	18	19	20	21	22	23	24	25	26	27	28	29	30	31	32	33	34
Stadium	H	A	H	A	H	H	A	H	H	H	A	A	A	H	H	H	A	H	A	A	A	A	H	H	A	A	H	A	A	H	A	H	H	A
Result	W	L	W	W	D	D	W	W	D	W	L	D	L	W	W	L	L	W	W	D	L	L	W	W	W	L	L							

Updated to match(es) played on June 29, 2015. Source: Match Results
A = Away; H = Home; W = Win; D = Draw; L = Loss

==== Match results ====
March 7 1	D.C. United	1–0	Montreal Impact	Washington, D.C.
15:00 EDT	Arrieta 58'	Report		Stadium: RFK Stadium; Attendance: 11,549; Referee: Mark Geiger

March 22 2	New York Red Bulls	2–0	D.C. United	Harrison, New Jersey
17:00 EDT	Wright-Phillips 25'; Sam 71'; Perrinelle (yellow card) 82'	Report	Boswell (yellow card) 78'	Stadium: Red Bull Arena; Attendance: 21,036; Referee: Alan Kelly

March 28 3	D.C. United	1–0	LA Galaxy	Washington, D.C.
19:00 EDT	Arnaud (yellow card) 46'; Boswell (yellow card) 89'; Pontius 90+3'	Report		Stadium: RFK Stadium; Attendance: 14,462; Referee: Ismail Elfath

April 3 4	Orlando City	0–1	D.C. United	Orlando, Florida
19:00 EDT	Molino (yellow card) 27'; Ceren (yellow card) 66'; Rivas (yellow card) 83'	Report	Arnaud (yellow card) 60'; Silva 90+1'	Stadium: Citrus Bowl; Attendance: 32,822; Referee: Chris Penso

April 11 5	D.C. United	2–2	New York Red Bulls	Washington, D.C.
19:00 EDT	Kitchen 26', 67'; Kemp (yellow card) 36'	Report	Grella (yellow card) 45'; Perrinelle (yellow card) 58', (goal) 68'; Sam 90'	Stadium: RFK Stadium; Attendance: 16,304; Referee: Jose Carlos Rivero

April 18 6	D.C. United	1–1	Houston Dynamo	Washington, D.C.
19:00 EDT	Rolfe 36'; Kitchen (yellow card) 50'	Report	Clark (yellow card) 9', (goal) 65'	Stadium: RFK Stadium; Attendance: 13,047; Referee: Jorge Gonzalez

April 25 7	Vancouver Whitecaps FC	1–2	D.C. United	Vancouver, British Columbia
22:30 EDT	Morales 2', (yellow card) 2'; Adekugbe (yellow card) 9'; Laba (yellow card) 34' (yellow-red card) 42'	Report	Boswell 9'; Rolfe 64'; Kitchen (yellow card) 84'; Farfan (yellow card) 88'	Stadium: BC Place; Attendance: 21,000; Referee: David Gantar

May 2 8	D.C. United	2–0	Columbus Crew	Washington, D.C.
19:00 EDT	Espindola 15', (yellow card) 71'; Franklin 41', (yellow card) 90'	Report		Stadium: RFK Stadium; Attendance: 13,107; Referee: Baldomero Toledo

May 9 9	D.C. United	1–1	Sporting Kansas City	Washington, D.C.
19:00 EDT	Arnaud (yellow card) 41'; Arrieta 42'	Report	Espinoza (yellow card) 9'; Dwyer 45'; Marín (yellow card) 81'	Stadium: RFK Stadium; Attendance: 16,221; Referee: Armando Villarreal

May 13 10	D.C. United	2–1	Orlando City SC	Washington, D.C.
20:00 EDT	Opare 70'; Rolfe 79'; Kemp (yellow card) 90+4'	Report	Larin 11'; Boden (yellow card) 60'; Avila (yellow card) 63'	Stadium: RFK Stadium; Attendance: 12,532; Referee: Jorge Gonzalez

May 17 11	Philadelphia Union	1–0	D.C. United	Chester, Pennsylvania
19:00 EDT	Williams (yellow card) 31'; White (yellow card) 79'; Pfeffer 90+3'; Edu (yellow card) 90+4'	Report	Kemp (yellow card) 65'	Stadium: PPL Park; Attendance: 16,853; Referee: Alan Kelly

May 23 12	New England Revolution	1–1	D.C. United	Foxborough, Massachusetts
19:30 EDT	Woodberry (yellow card) 26'; Davies 45+1'; Nguyen (yellow card) 45+2' (yellow-red card) 58'; Tierney (red card) 52'; Jones (yellow card) 88'	Report	Franklin (yellow card) 75'; Arrieta 80'; Kitchen (yellow card) 86'; Arnaud (yellow card) 89'	Stadium: Gillette Stadium; Attendance: 15,216; Referee: Mark Geiger

May 27 13	Portland Timbers	1–0	D.C. United	Portland, Oregon
19:30 EDT	Urruti 5'; Paparatto (yellow card) 56'; Chara (yellow card) 76'	Report	Jeffrey (yellow card) 29'; Boswell (yellow card) 90+2'	Stadium: Providence Park; Attendance: 21,144; Referee: Chris Penso

May 30 14	D.C. United	2–1	Philadelphia Union	Washington, D.C.
19:00 EDT	Doyle (yellow card) 44'; Pontius 45+1' (yellow card) 64'; Boswell (yellow card) 59'; Rolfe 85' (pen.)	Report	Le Toux 5'; Nogueira (yellow card) 63'	Stadium: RFK Stadium; Attendance: 16,284; Referee: Ted Unkel

June 3 15	D.C. United	3–1	Chicago Fire	Washington, D.C.
19:00 EDT	Halsti (yellow card) 30'; Espindola (yellow card) 57'; Arrieta 61', 69'; Doyle 75'	Report	Jones (yellow card) 24'; Accam 28'; Polster (yellow card) 58'	Stadium: RFK Stadium; Attendance: 11,218; Referee: Edvin Jurisevic

June 6 16	D.C. United	1–2	Toronto FC	Washington, D.C.
19:00 EDT	Birnbaum 6', (yellow card) 87'; Kitchen (yellow card) 65'; Opare (yellow card) 88'	Report	Giovinco 34', 83'; Creavalle (yellow card) 64'; Perquis (yellow card) 64'; Konopka (yellow card) 90+3'	Stadium: RFK Stadium; Attendance: 17,105; Referee: Jair Marrufo

June 14 17	Orlando City	1–0	D.C. United	Orlando, Florida
19:00 EDT	Kaká 30'	Report	Arnaud (yellow card) 23'	Stadium: Citrus Bowl; Attendance: 30,054; Referee: Jose Carlos Rivero

June 21 18	D.C. United	2–1	New England Revolution	Washington, D.C.
17:00 EDT	Rolfe 70', 81' (pen.); Arnaud (yellow card) 78'	Report	Davies 10'	Stadium: RFK Stadium; Attendance: 17,213; Referee: Ismail Elfath

June 24 19	Chicago Fire	0–1	D.C. United	Bridgeview, Illinois
20:30 EDT	Ritter (yellow card) 45'; Guly (yellow card) 79'	Report	Doyle 73'; Birnbaum (yellow card) 90'	Stadium: Toyota Park; Attendance: 11,833

June 27 20	Toronto FC	0–0	D.C. United	Toronto, Ontario
17:00 EDT	Warner (yellow card) 53'	Report	Korb (yellow card) 54'; Aguilar (yellow card) 61'; Coria (yellow card) 89'; Arnaud (yellow card) 90+1'	Stadium: BMO Field; Attendance: 16,382; Referee: Armando Villarreal

July 3 21	Seattle Sounders FC	1–0	D.C. United	Seattle, Washington
23:00 EDT	Scott (yellow card) 13'; Alonso (yellow card) 78'; Mears 88'; Neagle (yellow card) 90+1'	Report	Espíndola (red card) 27'; Doyle (yellow card) 58'; Kitchen (yellow card) 78'	Stadium: CenturyLink Field; Attendance: 40,410

July 18 22	FC Dallas	2–1	D.C. United	Frisco, Texas
23:00 EDT	Acosta 73'; Castillo 90+2' (yellow card) 90+2'	Report	Arrieta 77' (yellow card) 90+4'	Stadium: Toyota Stadium; Attendance: 16,215; Referee: Allen Chapman

July 26 23	D.C. United	3–2	Philadelphia Union	Washington, D.C.
17:00 EDT	Saborío 37'; DeLeon 66'; Espíndola 79'	Report	Sapong 1'; Le Toux 4'; Mbu (yellow card) 68'	Stadium: RFK Stadium; Attendance: 19,125; Referee: Drew Fischer

August 1 24	D.C. United	6–4	Real Salt Lake	Washington, D.C.
19:00 EDT	Rolfe 42' 54' (pen.); Kemp 59' (yellow card) 90+1'; Espíndola 63'; Kitchen 79'; DeLeon 85'		Plata 2'; Beckerman 21' (yellow card) 70'; Glad (yellow card) 28'; Sandoval (yellow card) 53'; Maund 62'; Mansally 68'	Stadium: RFK Stadium; Attendance: 17,288; Referee: Baldomero Toledo

August 8 25	Montreal Impact	0–1	D.C. United	Montreal, Quebec
17:00 EDT	Piatti (yellow card) 40'; Venegas (yellow card) 45'; Donadel (yellow card) 74'	Report	Rolfe 13'; Arnaud (yellow card) 64'; Franklin (yellow card) 78'	Stadium: Stade Saputo; Attendance: 18,769; Referee: Sorin Stoica

August 13 26	New York City FC	3–1	D.C. United	New York, New York
19:30 EDT	Facey (yellow card) 31'; McNamara 51' (yellow card) 75'; Villa 80' (yellow card) 81'; Poku 88'	Report	Saborio 36'	Stadium: Yankee Stadium; Attendance: 28,262; Referee: Jorge Gonzalez

August 22 27	D.C. United	0–2	San Jose Earthquakes	Washington, D.C.
19:00 EDT		Report	Wondolowski 4'; Salinas 52'; Godoy (yellow card) 89'	Stadium: RFK Stadium; Attendance: 20,043; Referee: Alan Kelly

August 30 28	New York Red Bulls	3–0	D.C. United	Harrison, New Jersey
19:00 EDT	Sam 33'; Wright-Phillips 42', 64'	Report	Birnbaum (yellow card) 8'; Doyle (yellow card) 65'	Stadium: Red Bull Arena; Attendance: 22,645; Referee: Jair Marrufo

September 12 29	Colorado Rapids	1–1	D.C. United	Commerce City, Colorado
21:00 EDT	Burling 28'; Sanchez (yellow card) 65'	Report	Birnbaum 87'	Stadium: Dick's Sporting Goods Park; Attendance: 15,953; Referee: Sorin Stoica

September 19 30	D.C. United	1–2	Columbus Crew SC	Washington, D.C.
19:00 EDT	Birnbaum (yellow card) 51'; Kitchen (yellow card) 62'; Rolfe 68' (pen.); Kemp (yellow card) 90+2'	Report	Finlay 27'; Kamara 49'; Klute (yellow card) 72'	Stadium: RFK Stadium; Attendance: 19,033; Referee: Ted Unkel

September 26 31	Montreal Impact	2–0	D.C. United	Montreal, Quebec
TBDEDT	Drogba 4', 11' (yellow card) 53'; Reo-Coker (yellow card) 66'	Report	DeLeon (yellow card) 49'; Birnbaum (yellow card) 50'; Doyle (yellow card) 62'	Stadium: Stade Saputo; Attendance: 20,801; Referee: Jair Marrufo

October 2 32	D.C. United	2–1	New York City FC	Washington, D.C.
19:00 EDT	Franklin (yellow card) 66'; Espíndola 73'; Boswell (yellow card) 87'; Saborío 90+2'	Report	Lampard 1'; Wingert (yellow card) 31'; Mena (yellow card) 43'; Mix (yellow card) 54'; Allen (yellow card) 81'; Hernandez (yellow card) 90+1'	Stadium: RFK Stadium; Attendance: 21,517; Referee: Silviu Petrescu

October 18 33	D.C. United	4–0	Chicago Fire	Washington, D.C.
14:00 EDT	Pontius 39'; Boswell 67'; Espíndola 71'; Saborío 80'	Report	Gilberto (yellow card) 50'; Accam (yellow card) 77'	Stadium: RFK Stadium; Attendance: 20,104; Referee: Sorin Stoica

October 25 34	Columbus Crew SC	5–0	D.C. United	Columbus, Ohio
17:00 EDT	McInerney 25' (yellow card) 59'; Meram 54'; Finlay 66', 67'; Schoenfeld 80'	Report	Kemp (yellow card) 58'	Stadium: Columbus Crew Stadium; Attendance: 19,121

=== MLS Cup Playoffs ===
==== Preliminary round ====
October 28	D.C. United	2–1	New England Revolution	Washington, D.C.
TBD EDT	Pontius 45'; Boswell (yellow card) 69'; Halsti (yellow card) 77'; Rolfe 83'	Report	Agudelo 15'; Farrell (yellow card) 44'; Jones (yellow card) 72' (red card) 90+2'	Stadium: RFK Stadium; Attendance: 11,554; Referee: Mark Geiger

==== Conference semifinals ====
November 1 First leg	D.C. United	0–1	New York Red Bulls	Washington, D.C.
15:00 EDT	Espindola (yellow card) 75'; Saborio (yellow card) 77'	Report	McCarty 72'; Miazga (yellow card) 35'; Zubar (yellow card) 88'; Wright-Phillips (yellow card) 88'	Stadium: RFK Stadium; Attendance: 19,525; Referee: Fotis Bazakos

November 8 Second leg	New York Red Bulls	1–0 (2–0 agg.)	D.C. United	Harrison, New Jersey
TBD EDT	Wright-Phillips 90+2'; Kljestan (yellow card) 74'	Report	Rolfe (yellow card) 25'; Kitchen (yellow card) 69'	Stadium: Red Bull Arena; Attendance: 25,219; Referee: Ted Unkel

=== CONCACAF Champions League ===
==== 2014–15 season ====
===== Quarterfinals =====
February 26 First leg	Alajuelense (Costa Rica)	5–2	(United States) D.C. United	Alajuela, Costa Rica
22:00 EDT	Rodríguez 15' (pen.); Ortiz 22', 54'; Venegas 27'; McDonald 90'	Report	Dykstra (yellow card) 14'; Espindola 24'; Arrieta (yellow card) 67'; Birnbaum 88'	Stadium: Alejandro Soto Stadium; Attendance: 17,895; Referee: (Mexico) Roberto Garcia

March 4 Second leg	D.C. United (United States)	2–1 (4–6 agg.)	(Costa Rica) Alajuelense	Washington, D.C.
20:00 EDT	Birnbaum (yellow card) 11'; Kitchen (yellow card) 27'; Arrieta 36' (yellow card) 37'; Korb (yellow card) 45+3'; Arnaud (yellow card) 63'; Espindola 88' (pen.)	Report	Venegas (yellow card) 11'; McDonald (yellow card) 45+3'; Korb 71' (o.g.); Alonso (yellow card) 81'; Acosta (yellow card) 88'	Stadium: RFK Stadium; Attendance: 8,137; Referee: (Guatemala) Walter López

==== 2015–16 season ====
===== Group stage =====
August 19 1	Arabe Unido (Panama)	0–1	(United States) D.C. United	Balboa, Panama
20:00 EDT	Gómez (yellow card) 59'; Cedeño (yellow card) 70'	Report	Doyle (yellow card) 76'; Aguilar 85' (yellow card) 90'	Stadium: Maracanã Stadium; Attendance: 2,000; Referee: Karl Tyrell (Jamaica)

August 25 2	D.C. United (United States)	3–0	(Jamaica) Montego Bay United	Washington, D.C.
20:00 EDT	Aguilar 37'; Opare 70'; Doyle 90'; Robinson (yellow card) 90+3'	Report	Ottey (yellow card) 42'	Stadium: RFK Stadium; Attendance: 2,000; Referee: Henry Bejarano (Costa Rica)

September 15 3	D.C. United (United States)	2–0	(Panama) Arabe Unido	Washington, D.C.
20:00 EDT	Doyle 1'; Jeffrey 22'	Report	Caesar (yellow card) 26'	Stadium: RFK Stadium; Attendance: 3,000

September 22 4	Montego Bay United (Jamaica)	3–3	(United States) D.C. United	Montego Bay, Jamaica
20:00 EDT	Woozencroft 27'; Williams 30' 49' (pen.); Wilkinson (yellow card) 36'; Drake (yellow card) 71'; McBayne (yellow card) 72'; Barrett (yellow card) 88'	Report	Aguilar (yellow card) 56'; Arrieta 59'; Opare 78'; Farfan 90+3'	Stadium: Montego Bay Sports Complex; Attendance: 500; Referee: Yadel Martínez (Cuba)

=== U.S. Open Cup ===
June 17 Fourth round	Pittsburgh Riverhounds (Pennsylvania)	1–3 (a.e.t.)	(Washington, D.C.) D.C. United	Pittsburgh, Pennsylvania
19:00 EDT	Vincent 23' (pen.), (yellow card) 116'; Flunder (yellow card) 41'	Report	Coria 8'; Arrieta (yellow card) 90+2'; Opare 92'; DeLeon 104'; Korb (yellow card) 112'; Aguilar (yellow card) 116'	Stadium: Highmark Stadium; Attendance: 3,988

June 30 Fifth round	Philadelphia Union (Pennsylvania)	2–1	(Washington, D.C.) D.C. United	Chester, Pennsylvania
19:00 EDT	Sapong (red card) 24'; Maidana (yellow card) 28'; Mbu 55'; Fabinho 79'		Jeffrey (yellow card) 23'; Arrieta 27'; Birnbaum (yellow card) 30'; Mishu (yellow card) 37'; Doyle (yellow card) 84'	Stadium: PPL Park; Attendance: 7,000

== Statistics ==
Last updated: October 18, 2015

=== Appearances and goals ===
No.	Pos	Nat	Player	Total		MLS		MLS Cup Playoffs		U.S. Open Cup		CONCACAF Champions League	
No.	Pos	Nat	Player	Apps	Goals	Apps	Goals	Apps	Goals	Apps	Goals	Apps	Goals
2	DF	(United States) USA	Taylor Kemp	31	1	25+2	1	3+0	0	0+0	0	1+0	0
4	MF	(Finland) FIN	Markus Halsti	22	0	12+2	0	3+0	0	2+0	0	2+1	0
5	DF	(United States) USA	Sean Franklin	28	1	23+1	1	2+0	0	0+0	0	2+0	0
6	DF	(Ghana) GHA	Kofi Opare	25	4	17+1	1	1+0	0	2+0	1	4+0	2
7	FW	(United States) USA	Eddie Johnson	0	0	0+0	0	0+0	0	0+0	0	0+0	0
8	MF	(United States) USA	Davy Arnaud	25	0	21+2	0	0+0	0	0+0	0	2+0	0
9	FW	(Costa Rica) CRC	Álvaro Saborío	17	4	9+3	4	2+1	0	0+0	0	2+0	0
10	FW	(Argentina) ARG	Fabián Espíndola	22	7	15+2	5	3+0	0	0+0	0	2+0	2
12	MF	(United States) USA	Michael Farfan	22	1	7+10	0	0+0	0	0+0	0	3+2	1
13	FW	(United States) USA	Chris Pontius	30	4	17+6	3	1+0	1	0+0	0	6+0	0
14	MF	(United States) USA	Nick DeLeon	35	3	25+4	2	3+0	0	0+1	1	2+0	0
15	DF	(United States) USA	Steve Birnbaum	31	3	21+1	2	3+0	0	1+0	0	4+1	1
17	MF	(Mexico) MEX	Miguel Aguilar	26	3	4+13	0	0+2	0	2+0	0	3+2	3
18	FW	(United States) USA	Chris Rolfe	37	11	30+1	10	3+0	1	0+1	0	1+1	0
19	FW	(Costa Rica) CRC	Jairo Arrieta	36	8	15+12	5	0+1	0	2+0	1	5+1	2
20	DF	(United States) USA	Jalen Robinson	6	0	0+0	0	0+0	0	2+0	0	4+0	0
21	MF	(Argentina) ARG	Facundo Coria	13	1	1+6	0	0+0	0	2+0	1	4+0	0
22	DF	(United States) USA	Chris Korb	20	0	17+1	0	0+0	0	0+1	0	1+0	0
23	MF	(United States) USA	Perry Kitchen	39	3	31+2	3	3+0	0	0+0	0	2+1	0
25	MF	(United States) USA	Jared Jeffrey	8	1	1+1	0	0+0	0	2+0	0	3+1	1
27	MF	(United States) USA	Collin Martin	4	0	0+0	0	0+0	0	0+0	0	0+4	0
28	GK	(United States) USA	Bill Hamid	28	0	24+0	0	3+0	0	0+0	0	1+0	0
30	FW	(Republic of Ireland) IRL	Conor Doyle	33	5	10+15	2	0+1	0	2+0	0	2+3	3
32	DF	(United States) USA	Bobby Boswell	38	2	33+1	2	2+0	0	0+0	0	2+0	0
34	DF	(United States) USA	Luke Mishu	8	0	2+0	0	0+0	0	2+0	0	4+0	0
48	GK	(United States) USA	Travis Worra	1	0	0+1	0	0+0	0	0+0	0	0+0	0
50	GK	(United States) USA	Andrew Dykstra	16	0	9+0	0	0+0	0	2+0	0	5+0	0
Players who left the club during the middle of the season
11	MF	(United States) USA	Luis Silva	16	1	4+10	1	0+0	0	1+1	0	0+0	0
29	FW	(Jamaica) JAM	Michael Seaton	0	0	0+0	0	0+0	0	0+0	0	0+0	0

=== Top scorers ===
Source: D.C. United

Rnk	Pos	No.	Player	MLS Season	MLS Cup	USOC	CCL	Total
1	MF	18	(United States) Chris Rolfe	10	1	0	0	11
2	FW	19	(Costa Rica) Jairo Arrieta	5	0	0	3	8
3	FW	10	(Argentina) Fabian Espindola	5	0	0	2	7
4	FW	30	(United States) Conor Doyle	2	0	0	3	5
5	FW	9	(Costa Rica) Alvaro Saborio	4	0	0	0	4
5	M/F	13	(United States) Chris Pontius	3	1	0	0	4
5	DF	6	(United States) Kofi Opare	1	0	1	2	4
8	DF	15	(United States) Steve Birnbaum	2	0	0	1	3
8	MF	23	(United States) Perry Kitchen	3	0	0	0	3
8	MF	14	(United States) Nick DeLeon	2	0	1	0	3
8	MF	17	(Mexico) Miguel Aguilar	0	0	0	3	3
12	DF	32	(United States) Bobby Boswell	2	0	0	0	2
13	DF	5	(United States) Sean Franklin	1	0	0	0	1
13	MF	11	(United States) Luis Silva	1	0	0	0	1
13	DF	2	(United States) Taylor Kemp	1	0	0	0	1
13	MF	21	(Argentina) Facundo Coria	0	0	1	0	1
13	MF	25	(United States) Jared Jeffrey	0	0	0	1	1
13	MF	12	(United States) Michael Farfan	0	0	0	1	1

=== Top assists ===
Source: D.C. United

Rnk	Pos	No.	Player	MLS Season	MLS Cup	USOC	CCL	Total
1	FW	10	(Argentina) Fabian Espindola	7	2	0	1	10
2	DF	2	(United States) Taylor Kemp	6	0	0	0	6
3	MF	14	(United States) Nick DeLeon	5	0	0	0	5
3	FW	19	(Costa Rica) Jairo Arrieta	2	0	1	2	5
5	MF	18	(United States) Chris Rolfe	4	0	0	0	4
5	M/F	13	(United States) Chris Pontius	1	0	0	3	4
7	MF	8	(United States) Davy Arnaud	3	0	0	0	3
7	MF	12	(United States) Michael Farfan	1	0	0	2	3
9	DF	22	(United States) Chris Korb	2	0	0	0	2
9	MF	21	(Argentina) Facundo Coria	1	0	0	1	2
9	MF	25	(United States) Jared Jeffrey	0	0	1	1	2
12	MF	23	(United States) Perry Kitchen	1	0	0	0	1
12	FW	30	(United States) Conor Doyle	0	0	1	0	1

=== Disciplinary record ===
#	Position	Nationality	Name	MLS Season		MLS Cup		U.S. Open Cup		CCL		Total	
#	Position	Nationality	Name	Booked	Sent off (straight red)	Booked	Sent off (straight red)	Booked	Sent off (straight red)	Booked	Sent off (straight red)	Booked	Sent off (straight red)
2	DF	(United States)	Taylor Kemp	6	0	0	0	0	0	0	0	6	0
4	D/M	(Finland)	Markus Halsti	1	0	1	0	0	0	0	0	2	0
5	DF	(United States)	Sean Franklin	4	0	0	0	0	0	0	0	4	0
6	DF	(United States)	Kofi Opare	1	0	0	0	0	0	0	0	1	0
7	FW	(United States)	Eddie Johnson	0	0	0	0	0	0	0	0	0	0
8	MF	(United States)	Davy Arnaud	8	0	0	0	0	0	1	0	9	0
9	FW	(Costa Rica)	Alvaro Saborio	0	0	1	0	1	0	0	0	1	0
10	FW	(Argentina)	Fabián Espíndola	2	1	1	0	0	0	0	0	3	1
11	MF	(United States)	Luis Silva	0	0	0	0	0	0	0	0	0	0
12	MF	(United States)	Michael Farfan	1	0	0	0	0	0	0	0	1	0
13	M/F	(United States)	Chris Pontius	1	0	0	0	0	0	0	0	1	0
14	MF	(United States)	Nick DeLeon	1	0	0	0	0	0	0	0	1	0
15	DF	(United States)	Steve Birnbaum	5	0	0	0	1	0	1	0	7	0
17	M/F	(Mexico)	Miguel Aguilar	1	0	0	0	1	0	2	0	4	0
18	M/F	(United States)	Chris Rolfe	0	0	1	0	0	0	0	0	1	0
19	FW	(Costa Rica)	Jairo Arrieta	1	0	0	0	1	0	2	0	4	0
20	DF	(United States)	Jalen Robinson	0	0	0	0	0	0	1	0	1	0
21	M/F	(Argentina)	Facundo Coria	1	0	0	0	0	0	0	0	1	0
22	DF	(United States)	Chris Korb	1	0	0	0	1	0	1	0	3	0
23	MF	(United States)	Perry Kitchen	4	0	1	0	0	0	1	0	6	0
25	MF	(United States)	Jared Jeffrey	1	0	0	0	1	0	0	0	2	0
27	MF	(United States)	Collin Martin	0	0	0	0	0	0	0	0	0	0
28	GK	(United States)	Bill Hamid	0	0	0	0	0	0	0	0	0	0
29	FW	(Jamaica)	Michael Seaton	0	0	0	0	0	0	0	0	0	0
30	FW	(United States)	Conor Doyle	5	0	0	0	1	0	1	0	7	0
32	DF	(United States)	Bobby Boswell	5	0	1	0	0	0	0	0	6	0
34	DF	(United States)	Luke Mishu	0	0	0	0	1	0	0	0	1	0
48	GK	(United States)	Travis Worra	0	0	0	0	0	0	0	0	0	0
50	GK	(United States)	Andrew Dykstra	0	0	0	0	0	0	1	0	1	0

== Transfers ==
=== In ===
No.	Pos.	Player	Transferred from	Fee/notes	Date	Source
	MF	(United States) Thomas McNamara	(United States) Chivas USA	Acquired from Chivas USA's Dispersal Draft	November 19, 2014	
	MF	(England) Andrew Driver	(United States) Houston Dynamo	Acquired in trade for Joe Willis and Samuel Inkoom	December 8, 2014	
4	D/M	(Finland) Markus Halsti	(Sweden) Malmö FF	Free Transfer	January 12, 2015	
19	FW	(Costa Rica) Jairo Arrieta	(United States) Orlando City SC	Acquired in trade for International Roster Spot	January 14, 2015	
17	FW	(Mexico) Miguel Aguilar	(United States) San Francisco Dons	Selected in the 2015 MLS SuperDraft	January 15, 2015	
	MF	(United States) Dan Metzger	(United States) Maryland Terrapins	Selected in the 2015 MLS SuperDraft	January 15, 2015	
12	MF	(United States) Michael Farfan	(Mexico) Cruz Azul	MLS Allocation signing	February 10, 2015	
48	GK	(United States) Travis Worra	(United States) New Hampshire Wildcats		February 25, 2015	
34	DF	(United States) Luke Mishu	(United States) Notre Dame Fighting Irish		March 6, 2015	
21	M/F	(Argentina) Facundo Coria	(Argentina) Argentinos Juniors	Free Transfer	May 18, 2015	
	FW	(Costa Rica) Álvaro Saborío	(United States) Real Salt Lake	Acquired in trade for Luis Silva	July 16, 2015	

=== Out ===
No.	Pos.	Player	Transferred to	Fee/notes	Date	Source
31	GK	(United States) Joe Willis	(United States) Houston Dynamo	Trade	December 8, 2014	
21	DF	(Ghana) Samuel Inkoom	(United States) Houston Dynamo	Trade	December 8, 2014	
4	DF	(Canada) Nana Attakora	(United States) San Antonio Scorpions	Option declined	December 8, 2014	
12	MF	(United States) Alex Caskey	Retired	Option declined	December 8, 2014	
2	DF	(United States) Jeff Parke	Retired	Option declined	December 8, 2014	
19	MF	(Canada) Kyle Porter	(United States) Atlanta Silverbacks	Option declined	December 8, 2014	
17	MF	(United States) Conor Shanosky	(United States) Louisville City FC	Option declined	December 8, 2014	
24	MF	(England) Lewis Neal	(United States) Orlando City SC	Selected in the 2014 MLS Expansion Draft	December 10, 2014	
	MF	(United States) Thomas McNamara	(United States) New York City FC	Selected in the 2014 MLS Expansion Draft	December 10, 2014	
	MF	(England) Andrew Driver	(Scotland) Aberdeen FC	Released	February 11, 2015	
	MF	(United States) Dan Metzger	(United States) New York Red Bulls II	Released	February 13, 2015	
3	M/F	(United States) David Estrada	(United States) Sacramento Republic	Released	February 20, 2015	
11	MF	(United States) Luis Silva	(United States) Real Salt Lake	Trade	July 16, 2015	
29	W	(Jamaica) Michael Seaton	(United States) Portland Timbers	Undisclosed	August 6, 2015	

=== Loan out ===
No.	Pos.	Player	Loaned to	Start	End	Source
48	GK	(United States) Travis Worra	(United States) Richmond Kickers	March 20, 2015		
34	DF	(United States) Luke Mishu	(United States) Richmond Kickers	March 20, 2015		
27	MF	(United States) Collin Martin	(United States) Richmond Kickers	March 20, 2015		
20	DF	(United States) Jalen Robinson	(United States) Richmond Kickers	March 20, 2015		
29	FW	(Jamaica) Michael Seaton	(Sweden) Örebro SK	April 2, 2015	June 4, 2015	
17	MF	(Mexico) Miguel Aguilar	(United States) Richmond Kickers	April 21, 2015		
