= 2017 D.C. United season =

D.C. United
2017 season
- General manager: Dave Kasper
- Head coach: Ben Olsen
- Stadium: RFK Stadium
- MLS: Conference: 11th Overall: 21st
- MLS Cup Playoffs: Did not qualify
- U.S. Open Cup: Fifth round
- Atlantic Cup: Runners-up
- Top goalscorer: League: Luciano Acosta (5); All: Luciano Acosta (5)
- Highest home attendance: 41,418 (Oct 22 vs. RB New York)
- Lowest home attendance: 5,286 (Jun 13 vs. Christos)
- Average home league attendance: 17,904
Home colors	Away colors

The 2017 D.C. United season was D.C. United's 22nd season of existence, and their 22nd in Major League Soccer, the top flight of American soccer.

An array of injuries to key players such as Steve Birnbaum and Patrick Mullins greatly affected D.C. United's form, as the team's scoring output and defensive performance suffered. United finished at the bottom of the Eastern Conference, and second-bottom of the overall league table. United failed to qualify for the MLS Cup Playoffs for the first time since 2013, and for only the second time in the last six seasons. United also had a short spell in the 2017 U.S. Open Cup, where they were bounced in the fifth round proper by New England Revolution.

The season was also United's final season at Robert F. Kennedy Memorial Stadium, ending a 22-year run for the club leasing the stadium. RFK Stadium was the final original stadium to be used by one of the charter franchises in MLS. It was at the time, the longest tenure for an MLS team in a specific stadium. Starting the following season, United moved into Audi Field, a soccer-specific stadium situated in the Buzzard Point neighborhood of Washington, D.C.

== Review ==
=== Off season ===
D.C. United began the off-season by dealing a copy of international reserve players to gain spots on the expansion draft protection list for domestic players they valued more. Former draft choice Miguel Aguilar and Kennedy Igboananike were traded, with the team acquiring lower round draft picks. None of United's players were selected in the 2016 MLS Expansion Draft, allowing the team to focus on building on the foundation of the surprising 2016 team. Luciano Acosta's loan status ended as he was signed on a permanent transfer from Boca Juniors. Shortly after the expansion draft, the team announced it had acquired on loan from Club Sport Herediano a young forward, José Guillermo Ortiz who was transferred from Alajuelense, for whom he had scored twice against D.C. in CONCACAF Champions League play, to Club Sport Herediano, which turned around and loaned him out to D.C. United. In the 2017 MLS SuperDraft D.C. dipped into a familiar talent pool, selecting University of Maryland fullback Chris Odoi-Atsem in the first round, In the second round, the team selected goalie Eric Klenofsky and defender Jo Vetle Rimstad. Following the draft, the team signed a Homegrown Player deal with midfielder Ian Harkes, winner of the Hermann Trophy and son of former D.C. United captain John Harkes. Before the season started, the team also added some veteran depth, signing Sebastien Le Toux.

=== Early season ===
The month of March proved to be frustrating. DC opened the season with a scoreless draw at home against Sporting Kansas City, followed by 2 straight shutout losses against New York City FC and Columbus Crew SC, barely creating any chances. Finally, the United offense broke through in their fourth match as off-season signing José Guillermo Ortiz scored an early goal against the Philadelphia Union on a deflected shot. Luciano Acosta added a penalty kick goal to give D.C. a 2–0 lead, which held up for a 2–1 victory as United recorded first win of the season. D.C. followed that result with a surprising 2–1 victory over NYCFC, on goals by Lloyd Sam and Acosta. Despite a subsequent 2–0 loss at New York Red Bulls, United continued a good stretch of play with a 2–2 draw at New England Revolution, on goals by Jared Jeffrey and Le Toux. D.C. United's first ever trip to Atlanta resulted in 3–1 victory, as the visitors rallied after an early goal, evening the score on an own goal and sealing the three points on goals by Le Toux and Acosta.

D.C. could not sustain those results, though, and dropped the next three matches at home, once again failing to score in three straight matches, including losses to Montreal Impact, Philadelphia Union and Chicago Fire. D.C. went on the road to play Vancouver Whitecaps FC and earned another road win, on Lamar Neagle's penalty kick goal. that result was followed by yet another 3 game scoreless stretch including a loss to Orlando City S.C., a home draw with LA Galaxy, and a 2–0 loss to Toronto F.C. Following that loss, United added Deshorn Brown to try to inject some venom into the attack. United did get back on the winning side, with a 2–1 victory of goals by Acosta and Patrick Nyarko, as expansion side Atlanta United F.C. made its first visit to D.C. It would be two more months before D.C. United recorded another victory.

Shutout road losses in Philadelphia and Montreal were sandwiched around a 2–1 U.S. Open Cup loss in New England despite an early goal by Ortiz. A trip to F.C. Dallas produced a disappointing 4–2 result, despite goals by Harkes and Brown, the first goals for each in a United uniform. Another road trip to face Seattle Sounders F.C. resulted in a 4–3 defeat, with United becoming the first Major League Soccer team to lose after taking a 3–0 lead. Brown and Harkes got the side off to a fast start with goals in their second straight game, and Sam added what might have seemed a clincher, but the late collapse seemed to be the ultimate word on a disastrous 2017 season. However, it only got worse. United lost to Houston Dynamo by 3–1, despite what would prove to be Bobby Boswell's last goal for D.C. United. That would be the team's fifth straight loss, the last four with Travis Worra in goal because Bill Hamid was with the national team for the 2017 CONCACAF Gold Cup. The first visit to Minnesota United FC marked Hamid's return to the lineup, but the defense was still wanting during a 4–0 thrashing by the previously struggling expansion side, the sixth straight loss for D.C. United.

=== Summer signings ===
Those losses provided the impetus for the front office to finally move to bolster the team. Boswell was sent to Atlanta to free up roster space. Neagle was returned to Seattle for the same reason, and Le Toux was given his release. Ortiz and Alhaji Kamara were released to free up international roster slots. D.C. added young Bolivian striker Bruno Miranda. That signing was followed in days to come by the acquisition of Hungarian international Zoltan Stieber, who was playing in the Bundesliga second-flight, and a dramatic move to sign U.S. international Paul Arriola, after dealing $500,000 in allocation funds to acquire his MLS rights from the L.A. Galaxy. In addition to Arriola, the team added a U.S. youth international, Russell Canouse. The Pennsylvania native left Germany to return and play for his boyhood favorite team. The wheeling and dealing also included the acquisition of former Columbus Crew standout goalkeeper Steve Clark, to provide insurance in case the team was unable to sign star goalie Bill Hamid to a new contract.

These moves really did seem to raise the play of the team. United almost took three points from league-leading Toronto after an early goal by Sam, but an own goal by Steve Birnbaum forced the team to settle for a draw. D.C. did lose two consecutive hard-fought 1–0 matches, against Real Salt Lake and Colorado Rapids. D.C. then completed a sweep of the season series with Atlanta United, winning 1–0 on an own goal. In the next match, the team earned the win over New England on a second-half goal by Acosta. Homegrown player centerback Jalen Robinson contributed to the consecutive clean sheets, going 90 in each, only his second and third appearance of the year.

While August had seemed bright for D.C., September saw the team suffer more reversals. Sloppy defensive play allowed Orlando City S.C. to take a 2–0 first half lead at R.F.K. Stadium, and a late goal by Kofi Opare was not enough to salvage a result. Despite a strong start in Chicago, an own goal by Harkes put the team behind the eight-ball, and the Chicago Fire sealed the deal with 2 second-half goals. However, the D.C. team rebounded before over 25,000 people in the next-to-last ever home game at R.F.K. Stadium, against San Jose Earthquakes. D.C. failed to convert on a number of early chances, but the second half produced the fastest four-goal outburst by one player in league history, as Patrick Mullins ended his long goalless start to the 2017 season, scoring a hat trick with 3 finishes in front of goal, followed by a stunning free kick goal to cap the 4–0 win. Mullins was the first player to score four goals in one half of a MLS match. New Designated Player Paul Arriola got his first two assists in his seventh game with the team. The game may have also been noteworthy for being Steve Clark's first match in goal for D.C. Clark was barely tested in turning in a clean sheet. The win did not move the team out of the Eastern Conference cellar, but it did move the team ahead of a pair of Western Conference teams in the league-wide table. It also raised questions as to what might have been for a team that never seemed to finish chances, wasting the frequent heroic efforts of goalie Bill Hamid throughout the season.

D.C. kicked off a three-game road trip with a midweek match against New York Red Bulls. As usual, NYRB dominated possession and took the lead when youngster Tyler Adams scored his first career MLS goal. D.C., however, drew even on a free kick in first half stoppage time, as Zoltan Stieber notched his first in MLS when the ball deflected off the wall past NY goalie Luis Robles. The home team constantly tested the D.C. goal but Clark (playing for an injured Hamid) proved up to the task, including stopping a point-blank shot by Bradley Wright-Phillips. Against the run of play, D.C. briefly took the lead, when Russell Canouse got his first assist, threading a pass to Mullins, who scored his fifth goal in five days. NYRB, however, regained the lead on another goal by Adams and penalty kick goal by Gonzalo Veron. D.C. seemed destined for defeat, but they struck again in stoppage time, the tying goal coming when a defender misplayed a cross by Canouse, resulting in an own goal, the fourth of the season that counted for United. Nonetheless, D.C. needed a full three points to remain in playoff contention, so the draw ended any possibility of post-season play.

With little to lay for on a trip to Columbus, D.C. United fell 2–0. A road game in Portland started brightly, but a giveaway in the box by Korb forced Clark to foul, and the resultant penalty kick put United in a hole. The Timbers added three goals in the second half, including one while defender Steve Birnbaum lay unconscious, suffering his third concussion of the season.

=== RFK finale ===
In the build-up to the final match of the season, the team sought to honor their history in R.F.K. Stadium. as they prepared to leave the stadium behind. First, came the announcement that longtime goalkeeper Bill Hamid would not return in 2018, having agreed to join a team in Denmark, F.C. Midtjylland. On the day of the game, players from the team's 21-year history came together for a "Legends" game, featuring goals by Marco Etcheverry, Luciano Emilio and Freddy Adu, among others. The main event was the deciding event of the 2018 version of the Atlantic Cup, against New York Red Bulls. One of the largest regular-season home crowds in team history came to celebrate history, but also had the pleasure of seeing the team take the lead before halftime on a scintillating cross by Acosta that was finished by Arriola, who scored his first ever MLS goal, which later captured Goal of the Week honors. The visitors tied the score in the second half and, after Acosta was ejected, it was probably only a matter of time before the Red Bulls took the lead. As it was, D.C. closed the season with yet another defeat—the third consecutive loss, and finished even on points with the L.A. Galaxy in the league cellar. Because D.C. had more wins, they would be drafting after the Galaxy in the league's 2018 pre-season drafts.

== Non-competitive ==
=== Preseason ===
February 1 1	United States U-17	0–6	D.C. United	Bradenton
10:00 EST		Report	Vincent 22'; Sam 24'; Neagle 27'; Ortiz 48'; Le Toux 53'; Büscher 66'	Stadium: IMG Academy

February 4 2	D.C. United	1–1	Philadelphia Union	St. Petersburg
TBD EST	Ortiz 2nd half'	Report	Sapong 1st half'	Stadium: Al Lang Stadium

February 8 3	D.C. United	3–2	Jönköpings Södra IF	Bradenton
16:00 EST	Birnbaum (yellow card) 22'; Sarvas 28'; Franklin (yellow card) 37'; Acosta 43'; Le Toux 76'	Report	Aasmundsen 81', 90'	Stadium: IMG Academy

February 18 Suncoast Invitational	D.C. United	2–4	Montreal Impact	St. Petersburg
17:00 EST	Birnbaum 14'; Nyarko 56'	Report	Oduro 6'; Piatti 22' (pen.); Mancosu 53'; Jackson-Hamel 90'	Stadium: Al Lang Stadium

February 22 Suncoast Invitational	St. Louis FC	0–3	D.C. United	Clearwater
16:00 EST		Report	Kamara 20'; Le Toux 59'; Nyarko 88'	Stadium: Joe DiMaggio Sports Complex

February 25 Suncoast Invitational	D.C. United	3–2	Philadelphia Union	St. Petersburg
17:00 EST	Nyarko 14'; Jeffrey 21'; Mullins 24'; Acosta (yellow card) 34'; Sarvas (yellow card) 43'	Report	Marquez (yellow card) 9'; Fabinho (yellow card) 21'; Rosenberry (yellow card) 33'; Bedoya (yellow card) 34' (yellow-red card) 89'; Sapong (yellow card) 46'; Onyewu 51'; Epps 86'	Stadium: Al Lang Stadium

== Competitive ==
=== MLS ===
March 4, 2017 1	D.C. United	0–0	Sporting Kansas City	Washington, D.C.
19:00 EST	Franklin (yellow card) 54'; Vincent (yellow card) 64'	Report	Sinovic (yellow card) 37'; Espinoza (yellow card) 72'	Stadium: RFK Memorial Stadium; Attendance: 18,268; Referee: Robert Sibiga

March 12, 2017 2	New York City FC	4–0	D.C. United	New York City, New York
14:00 EST	Wallace 8'; Villa 28', 75'; Morález 39'	Report	Birnbaum (yellow card) 24'; Jeffrey (yellow card) 35'; DeLeon (yellow card) 63'; Vincent (yellow card) 77'; Neagle (yellow card) 85'	Stadium: Yankee Stadium; Attendance: 24,259; Referee: Alan Kelly

March 18, 2017 3	D.C. United	0–2	Columbus Crew	Washington, D.C.
19:00 EST	Harkes (yellow card) 17'; Sam (yellow card) 41'; Sarvas (yellow card) 70'	Report	Higuaín 38' (PK); Afful (yellow card) 45+2'; Kamara 66' (PK); Williams (yellow card) 17'	Stadium: RFK Memorial Stadium; Attendance: 14,031; Referee: Ted Unkel

April 1, 2017 4	D.C. United	2–1	Philadelphia Union	Washington, D.C.
19:00 EST	Ortiz 18'; Acosta 27' (pen.); Sarvas (yellow card) 66'	Report	Ilsinho (yellow card) 57'; Jones (yellow card) 61'; Sapong 71'	Stadium: RFK Memorial Stadium; Attendance: 14,560; Referee: Ricardo Salazar

April 8, 2017 5	D.C. United	2–1	New York City FC	Washington, D.C.
16:00 EST	Sam 53'; Acosta 73'	Report	Callens (yellow card) 11'; Matarrita (yellow card) 35'; Villa 84'	Stadium: RFK Memorial Stadium; Attendance: 18,855; Referee: Drew Fischer

April 15, 2017 6	New York Red Bulls	2–0	D.C. United	Harrison, New Jersey
19:30 EST	Felipe (yellow card) 40'; Kljestan (yellow card) 45+2'; Muyl 46'; Lawrence (yellow card) 56'; Wright-Phillips 62'	Report	Acosta (yellow card) 52'; Franklin (yellow card) 80'	Stadium: Red Bull Arena; Attendance: 20,104; Referee: Sorin Stoica

April 22, 2017 7	New England Revolution	2–2	D.C. United	Foxborough, Massachusetts
19:30 EST	Nguyen 5'; Mlinar (yellow card) 39'; Agudelo 48'; Kouassi (yellow card) 89'	Report	Jeffrey 26'; Le Toux (yellow card) 27' (goal) 28'	Stadium: Gillette Stadium; Attendance: 16,591; Referee: Jose Carlos Rivero

April 30, 2017 8	Atlanta United FC	1–3	D.C. United	Atlanta, Georgia
15:00 EST	Jones 9'; Asad (yellow card) 83'	Report	Franklin (yellow card) 2'; Parkhurst 25' (o.g.); Acosta 36'; Jeffrey (yellow card) 45'; Le Toux 55'	Stadium: Bobby Dodd Stadium; Attendance: 46,011; Referee: Jair Marrufo

May 6, 2017 9	D.C. United	0–1	Montreal Impact	Washington, D.C.
TBD EST		Report	Tabla 18'; Bernardello (yellow card) 45'; Lovitz (yellow card) 50'; Fisher (yellow card) 59'	Stadium: RFK Memorial Stadium; Attendance: 14,993; Referee: Robert Sibiga

May 13, 2017 10	D.C. United	0–4	Philadelphia Union	Washington, D.C.
19:00 EST	Neagle (yellow card) 19'; Acosta (red card) 55'; Sarvas (yellow card) 64'	Report	Fabinho (yellow card) 4'; Bedoya (yellow card) 9'; Medunjanin 39'; Onyewu 64'; Picault 78'; Herbers 88'	Stadium: RFK Memorial Stadium; Attendance: 14,576; Referee: Chris Penso

May 20, 2017 11	D.C. United	0–1	Chicago Fire	Washington, D.C.
16:00 EST	Sarvas (yellow card) 7'; Neagle (yellow card) 64'	Report	Accam 52'; Schweinsteiger (yellow card) 66'	Stadium: RFK Memorial Stadium; Attendance: 20,618; Referee: Hilario Grajeda

May 27, 2017 12	Vancouver Whitecaps FC	0–1	D.C. United	Vancouver, British Columbia
19:00 EST	Tchani (yellow card) 53'; Parker (yellow card) 90+7'	Report	Neagle 61' (pen.); Opare (yellow card) 76'	Stadium: BC Place; Attendance: 20,905; Referee: Sorin Stoica

May 31, 2017 13	Orlando City SC	2–0	D.C. United	Orlando, Florida
19:30 EST	Toia (yellow card) 35'; Bendik (yellow card) 65'; Larin 67'; Barnes 88'	Report	Kemp (yellow card) 34'; Sam (yellow card) 66'	Stadium: Orlando City Stadium; Attendance: 24,112; Referee: Allan Chapman

June 3, 2017 14	D.C. United	0–0	LA Galaxy	Washington, D.C.
19:00 EST	Sam (yellow card) 37'	Report	Van Damme (yellow card) 35'	Stadium: RFK Memorial Stadium; Attendance: 17,730; Referee: Drew Fischer

June 17, 2017 15	Toronto FC	2–0	D.C. United	Toronto, Ontario
TBD EST	Vázquez (yellow card) 27'; Giovinco (yellow card) 40'; Altidore 60' (yellow card) 65'; Hamilton 85'	Report	Opare (yellow card) 72'; Harkes (yellow card) 83'	Stadium: BMO Field; Attendance: 28,627; Referee: Jose Carlos Rivero

June 21, 2017 16	D.C. United	2–1	Atlanta United FC	Washington, D.C.
19:30 EST	Acosta 23'; Nyarko 60' (Korb, Harkes); Neagle (yellow card) 73'	Report	Gressel 17' (Almirón, Asad); Larentowicz (yellow card) 62'; Vázquez (yellow card) 79'	Stadium: RFK Memorial Stadium; Attendance: 14,594; Referee: Nima Saghafi

June 24, 2017 17	Philadelphia Union	1–0	D.C. United	Chester, Pennsylvania
19:00 EST	Picault 32' (Bedoya, Gaddis)	Report	Ortiz (yellow card) 31'	Stadium: Talen Energy Stadium; Attendance: 17,656; Referee: Sorin Stoica

July 1, 2017 18	Montreal Impact	2–0	D.C. United	Montreal, Quebec, Canada
TBD EST	Dzemaili 21' (Bernardello); Tabla (yellow card) 22'; Duvall 23' (Dzemaili); Mancosu (yellow card) 25'; Camara (yellow card) 82'; Bush (yellow card) 89'	Report	Sam (yellow card) 45+1'; Sarvas (yellow card) 85'	Stadium: Saputo Stadium; Attendance: 18,707; Referee: Jorge Gonzalez

July 4, 2017 19	FC Dallas	4–2	D.C. United	Frisco, Texas
20:30 EST	Harris 41' (Ulloa); Grana (yellow card) 43'; Lamah 45+3', 55' (Díaz, Barrios); Urruti 47' (Barrios)	Report	Harkes 30' (Nyarko); Jeffrey (yellow card) 49'; Brown 57' (Acosta)	Stadium: Toyota Stadium; Attendance: 16,291; Referee: David Gantar

July 19, 2017 20	Seattle Sounders FC	4–3	D.C. United	Seattle, Washington
22:30 EST	Bruin 51' (Jones); Evans 62' (Jones, Tolo); Svennson 74' (Lodiero); Roldan 78' (Bruin); Loderio (red card) 87'	Report	Brown 8' (Nyarko); Harkes 27' (Franklin, Sam); Sarvas (yellow card) 33'; Sam 50' (Acosta)	Stadium: CenturyLink Field; Attendance: 42,714; Referee: Kevin Stott

July 22, 2017 21	D.C. United	1–3	Houston Dynamo	Washington, D.C.
19:00 EST	Boswell 62' (Sam, Jeffrey); DeLeon (yellow card) 63'; Jeffrey (yellow card) 72'	Report	Wenger 6' (Alex) (yellow card) 90+5'; Alex (yellow card) 13'; Manotas 15' (Alex); Rodríguez 17' (Wenger, Alex); Deric (yellow card) 90+4'	Stadium: RFK Memorial Stadium; Attendance: 15,321; Referee: Marcos Deoliveira

July 29, 2017 22	Minnesota United FC	4–0	D.C. United	Minneapolis, Minnesota
20:00 EST	Ramirez 7' (Molino); Danladi 40' (Molino); Jeffrey 58' (OG); Shuttleworth (yellow card) 79'; Ibarra 90+1' (Venegas)	Report	Kemp (yellow card) 36'	Stadium: TCF Bank Stadium; Attendance: 20,146; Referee: Robert Sibiga

August 5, 2017 23	D.C. United	1–1	Toronto FC	Washington, D.C.
19:00 EST	Opare 6' (Sam); Franklin (yellow card) 38'; Sam (red card) 4'	Report	Birnbaum 52' (OG) Delgado (yellow card) 11'; Bradley (yellow card) 36'	Stadium: RFK Memorial Stadium; Attendance: 16,444; Referee: Allen Chapman

August 12, 2017 24	D.C. United	0–1	Real Salt Lake	Washington, D.C.
19:00 EST	Arriola (yellow card) 64'	Report	Wingert (yellow card) 62'; Silva 64'	Stadium: RFK Memorial Stadium; Attendance: 14,193; Referee: Drew Fischer

August 19, 2017 25	Colorado Rapids	0–1	D.C. United	Commerce City, Colorado
21:00 EST	Watts (yellow card) 78'	Report	Watts 27' (OG); Acosta (yellow card) 79'; DeLeon (yellow card) 85'	Stadium: DSG Park; Attendance: 16,089; Referee: Alex Chilowicz

August 23, 2017 26	D.C. United	1–0	Atlanta United FC	Washington, D.C.
19:30 EST	Acosta (yellow card) 18'; Brown (yellow card) 24'; Parkhurst 46' (OG); Sarvas (yellow card) 53'; Mullins (yellow card) 90+2'	Report	Walkes (yellow card) 12'; Carmona (yellow card) 78'	Stadium: RFK Memorial Stadium; Attendance: 11,972; Referee: Ted Unkel

August 26, 2017 27	D.C. United	1–0	New England Revolution	Washington, D.C.
19:00 EST	Canouse (yellow card) 26'; Acosta 71' (Sam, Opare); Sarvas (yellow card) 81'	Report	Dielna (yellow card) 63'; Kamara (yellow card) 65'	Stadium: RFK Memorial Stadium; Attendance: 15,539; Referee: Jose Carlos Rivero

September 9, 2017 28	D.C. United	1–2	Orlando City SC	Washington, D.C.
19:00 EST	Acosta (yellow card) 24'; Franklin (yellow card) 78'; Opare 89' (Brown, Sarvas); Sam (yellow card) 90+6'	Report	Larin 19' (Dwyer); Barnes 28'; Sutter (yellow card) 32'; Carrasco (yellow card) 76' (yellow-red card) 79'; Hines (red card) 90+5'; Kaká (yellow card) 90+9'	Stadium: RFK Memorial Stadium; Attendance: 18,028; Referee: Dave Gantar

September 16, 2017 29	Chicago Fire	3–0	D.C. United	Bridgeview, Illinois
20:30 EST	Vincent (yellow card) 15' (goal) 62' (Alvarez, Conner); Nikolic 90' (PK) Harkes 23' (OG)	Report		Stadium: Toyota Park; Attendance: 15,643; Referee: Ismail Elfath

September 23, 2017 30	D.C. United	4–0	San Jose Earthquakes	Washington, D.C.
19:00 EST	Mullins 57' (Arriola, Acosta), 60' (Arriola), 68', 88'	Report	Jungwirth (yellow card) 50'; Imperiale (yellow card) 67'	Stadium: RFK Memorial Stadium; Attendance: 25,229; Referee: Marcos DeOliveira

September 27, 2017 31	New York Red Bulls	3–3	D.C. United	Harrison, New Jersey
19:30 EST	Tyler Adams 19' (Lade, Kljestan), 74'; Perrinelle (yellow card) 45'; Kjlestan (yellow card) 68'; Verón 78' (PK)	Report	Canouse (yellow card) 37'; Stieber 45+1' (yellow card) 64'; Mullins 70' (Canouse, Stieber); Birmbaum (yellow card) 87' Escobar 90+1' (OG)	Stadium: Red Bull Arena; Attendance: 16,538; Referee: Chris Penso

September 30, 2017 32	Columbus Crew	2–0	D.C. United	Columbus, Ohio
19:30 EST	Williams 14' (Higuaín); Mensah (yellow card) 49'; Meram 56' (Artur)	Report	Canouse (yellow card) 18'	Stadium: Mapfre Stadium; Attendance: 17,350; Referee: Ted Unkel

October 15, 2017 33	Portland Timbers	4–0	D.C. United	Portland, Oregon
19:30 EST	Valeri 45+3' (PK); Powell 50' (Valeri); Guzmán (yellow card) 58'; Blanco 60' (Valeri), 86' (Ebobisse)	Report	Clark (yellow card) 58'	Stadium: Providence Park; Attendance: 21,114; Referee: Mark Geiger

October 22, 2017 34	D.C. United	1–2	New York Red Bulls	Washington, D.C.
16:00 EST	Arriola 44' (Acosta); Acosta (yellow card) 70'	Report	Escobar (yellow card) 23'; Murillo 68' (Keita); Veron 75' (Muyl, Bezecourt); Muyl (yellow card) 90+6'	Stadium: RFK Memorial Stadium; Attendance: 41,418; Referee: David Gantar

=== U.S. Open Cup ===
June 13, 2017 Fourth round	D.C. United	4–1	Christos FC	Boyds, Maryland
19:00 EST	Büscher 35', 90'; Harkes (yellow card) 63' (goal) 90+2'; Robinson (yellow card) 71'; Sam 81'	Report	Kansaye 23'; Houapeau (yellow card) 70'	Stadium: Maryland SoccerPlex; Attendance: 5,286

June 28, 2017 Fifth round	New England Revolution	2–1	D.C. United	Cambridge, Massachusetts
19:30 EST	Fagundez 44'; Woodberry (yellow card) 37'; Wright 48'; Smith (yellow card) 57'	Report	Ortiz 7' (Harkes); Jeffrey (yellow card) 10'; Korb (yellow card) 90+4'	Stadium: Jordan Field; Attendance: 2,572; Referee: Mark Kadlecik

== Player statistics ==
As of June 14, 2017

=== Appearances and goals ===
No.	Pos	Nat	Player	Total		MLS		MLS Cup		U.S. Open Cup	
No.	Pos	Nat	Player	Apps	Goals	Apps	Goals	Apps	Goals	Apps	Goals
Goalkeepers
1	GK	(United States) USA	Travis Worra	2	0	1+0	0	0	0	1	0
24	GK	(United States) USA	Eric Klenofsky	0	0	0	0	0	0	0	0
28	GK	(United States) USA	Bill Hamid	13	0	13+0	0	0	0	0	0
50	GK	(United States) USA	Steve Clark	5	0	5+0	0	0	0	0	0
Defenders
2	DF	(United States) USA	Taylor Kemp	13	0	13	0	0	0	0	0
3	DF	(United States) USA	Chris Odoi-Atsem	2	0	0+1	0	0	0	1	0
5	DF	(United States) USA	Sean Franklin	9	0	7+2	0	0	0	0	0
6	DF	(Ghana) GHA	Kofi Opare	9	0	7+1	0	0	0	0+1	0
15	DF	(United States) USA	Steve Birnbaum	10	0	10+0	0	0	0	0	0
20	DF	(United States) USA	Jalen Robinson	2	0	1	0	0	0	1	0
22	DF	(United States) USA	Chris Korb	5	0	3+1	0	0	0	1	0
Midfielders
4	MF	(United States) USA	Russell Canouse	10	0	10+0	0	0	0	0	0
7	MF	(Brazil) BRA	Marcelo Sarvas	12	0	7+4	0	0	0	1	0
8	MF	(Ghana) GHA	Lloyd Sam	14	2	13+0	1	0	0	0+1	1
10	MF	(Argentina) ARG	Luciano Acosta	11	3	10+1	3	0	0	0	0
12	MF	(Ghana) GHA	Patrick Nyarko	7	0	6+1	0	0	0	0	0
13	MF	(United States) USA	Paul Arriola	10	0	10+0	0	0	0	0	0
14	MF	(United States) USA	Nick DeLeon	6	0	6+0	0	0	0	0	0
19	FW	(Hungary) HUN	Zoltán Stieber	8	1	6+2	1	0	0	0	0
21	MF	(United States) USA	Chris Durkin	1	0	0	0	0	0	1	0
23	MF	(United States) USA	Ian Harkes	13	1	11+1	0	0	0	0+1	1
25	MF	(United States) USA	Jared Jeffrey	13	1	12+1	1	0	0	0	0
26	MF	(England) ENG	Rob Vincent	2	0	0+2	0	0	0	0	0
33	MF	(Germany) GER	Julian Büscher	4	2	2+1	0	0	0	1	2
Forwards
16	FW	(United States) USA	Patrick Mullins	8	0	5+3	0	0	0	0	0
17	FW	(Jamaica) JAM	Deshorn Brown	0	0	0	0	0	0	0	0
18	FW	(United States) USA	Chris Rolfe	0	0	0	0	0	0	0	0
27	FW	(Bolivia) BOL	Bruno Miranda	5	0	0+5	0	0	0	0	0
Left during the season
9	FW	(Costa Rica) CRC	José Guillermo Ortiz	18	2	7+9	1	0	0	2	1
11	FW	(France) FRA	Sébastien Le Toux	17	2	8+8	2	0	0	1	0
13	FW	(United States) USA	Lamar Neagle	23	1	9+13	1	0	0	1	0
31	DF	(Canada) CAN	Maxim Tissot	1	0	1+0	0	0	0	0	0
32	DF	(United States) USA	Bobby Boswell	11	1	10+0	1	0	0	1	0
45	FW	(Sierra Leone) SLE	Alhaji Kamara	1	0	0+1	0	0	0	0	0

=== Top scorers ===
As of August 14, 2017

Rank	Position	Name	MLS	MLS Cup	Open Cup	Total
1	MF	(Argentina) Luciano Acosta	5	0	0	5
2	MF	(United States) Ian Harkes	2	0	2	4
2	MF	(Ghana) Lloyd Sam	2	0	1	3
2	FW	(Jamaica) Deshorn Brown	2	0	0	2
2	FW	(France) Sébastien Le Toux	2	0	0	2
2	MF	(Germany) Julian Büscher	0	0	2	2
7	MF	(United States) Jared Jeffrey	1	0	0	1
7	FW	(Costa Rica) José Guillermo Ortiz	1	0	0	1
Total			8	0	4	12

=== Disciplinary record ===
Rank	Position	Name	MLS		MLS Cup		USOC Cup		Total	
Rank	Position	Name	Booked	Sent off (straight red)	Booked	Sent off (straight red)	Booked	Sent off (straight red)	Booked	Sent off (straight red)
1	MF	Marcelo Sarvas	4	0	0	0	0	0	4	0
2	DF	Sean Franklin	3	0	0	0	0	0	3	0
2	MF	Lamar Neagle	3	0	0	0	0	0	3	0
2	MF	Lloyd Sam	3	0	0	0	0	0	3	0
3	FW	Luciano Acosta	1	1	0	0	0	0	1	1
3	MF	Jared Jeffrey	2	0	0	0	0	0	2	0
3	MF	Rob Vincent	2	0	0	0	0	0	2	0
3	MF	Ian Harkes	1	0	0	0	1	0	2	0
4	DF	Steve Birnbaum	1	0	0	0	0	0	1	0
4	MF	Nick DeLeon	1	0	0	0	0	0	1	0
4	FW	Sébastien Le Toux	1	0	0	0	0	0	1	0
4	DF	Kofi Opare	1	0	0	0	0	0	1	0
4	DF	Jalen Robinson	0	0	0	0	1	0	1	0
4	DF	Taylor Kemp	1	0	0	0	0	0	1	0

== Transfers ==
=== In ===
No.	Pos.	Nat.	Name	Age	Moving from	Type	Transfer window	Ends	Transfer fee	Source
10	MF	(Argentina)	Luciano Acosta	22	Boca Juniors (Argentina)	Transfer	Pre-season	Undisclosed	Undisclosed	
9	FW	(Costa Rica)	José Guillermo Ortiz	24	Herediano (Costa Rica)	Loan	Pre-season	2017	Undisclosed	
23	MF	(United States)	Ian Harkes	21	Wake Forest Demon Deacons	Transfer	Pre-season	Undisclosed	Free (Note: Harkes signed a Homegrown player contract. This means his salary will not count against the salary cap. There was no fee for signing Harkes.)	
11	FW	(France)	Sébastien Le Toux	33	Colorado Rapids	Transfer	Pre-season	2017	Free	
31	DF	(Canada)	Maxim Tissot	24	Ottawa Fury FC (Canada)	Transfer	Pre-season		Free	
3	DF	(United States)	Chris Odoi-Atsem	21	Maryland Terrapins	Draft	Pre-season		Free	
24	GK	(United States)	Eric Klenofsky	22	Monmouth Hawks	Draft	Pre-season		Free	
22	DF	(United States)	Chris Korb	29		Re-signed	Mid-season		Free	
17	FW	(Jamaica)	Deshorn Brown	26	Tampa Bay Rowdies	Transfer	Mid-season		Free	
27	FW	(Bolivia)	Bruno Miranda	19	Universidad de Chile	Loan	Mid-season			
19	MF	(Hungary)	Zoltán Stieber	28	1. FC Kaiserslautern (Germany)	Transfer	Mid-season			
4	MF	(United States)	Russell Canouse	22	TSG 1899 Hoffenheim (Germany)	Transfer	Mid-season			
13	MF	(United States)	Paul Arriola	22	Tijuana (Mexico)	Transfer	Mid-season			
50	GK	(United States)	Steve Clark	31	AC Horsens (Denmark)	Transfer	Mid-season		Free	

==== Draft picks ====
Draft picks are not automatically signed to the team roster. Only trades involving draft picks and executed after the start of 2017 MLS SuperDraft will be listed in the notes.

2017 D.C. United SuperDraft Picks
Round	Selection	Player	Position	College	Status
1	12	(United States) Chris Odoi-Atsem	DF	Maryland	Signed by DC United & loaned to Richmond.
2	34	(United States) Eric Klenofsky	GK	Monmouth	Signed by DC United & loaned to Richmond.
2	43	(Norway) Jo Vetle Rimstad	DF	Radford	Not signed.
4	78	PASS			

=== Out ===
No.	Pos.	Nat.	Name	Age	Moving to	Type	Transfer window	Transfer fee	Source
9	FW	(Costa Rica)	Álvaro Saborío	34	(Costa Rica) Saprissa	Release	Pre-season	Free	
34	DF	(United States)	Luke Mishu	25		Retirement	Pre-season		
17	MF	(Mexico)	Miguel Aguilar	23	LA Galaxy	Trade	Pre-season	(Note: Traded for two fourth round picks in the 2018 and 2019 MLS SuperDraft.)	
77	FW	(Nigeria)	Kennedy Igboananike	27	Portland Timbers	Trade	Pre-season	(Note: Traded for second-round pick in the 2017 MLS SuperDraft.)	
50	GK	(United States)	Andrew Dykstra	31	Sporting Kansas City	Waiver	Pre-season	2016 MLS Re-Entry Draft	
27	MF	(United States)	Collin Martin	22	Minnesota United FC	Trade	Pre-season	(Note: Traded for a fourth-round pick in the 2018 MLS SuperDraft.)	
30	GK	(United States)	Charlie Horton	22		Release	Pre-season		
31	MF	(Canada)	Maxim Tissot	25	San Francisco Deltas	Release	Mid-season	Free	
45	FW	(Sierra Leone)	Alhaji Kamara	23	(Saudi Arabia) Al-Taawoun	Transfer	Mid-season	Free	
9	FW	(Costa Rica)	José Guillermo Ortiz	24		Waiver	Mid-season		
13	MF	(United States)	Lamar Neagle	30	Seattle Sounders FC	Trade	Mid-season		
45	DF	(United States)	Bobby Boswell	34	Atlanta United FC	Trade	Mid-season		
11	FW	(France)	Sébastien Le Toux	33		Release	Mid-season		
