= Worra =

Worra is a surname. Notable people with the surname include:

- Bryan Thao Worra (born 1973), Laotian American writer
- Travis Worra (born 1993), American soccer player
