= Perry Kitchen =

American professional soccer player

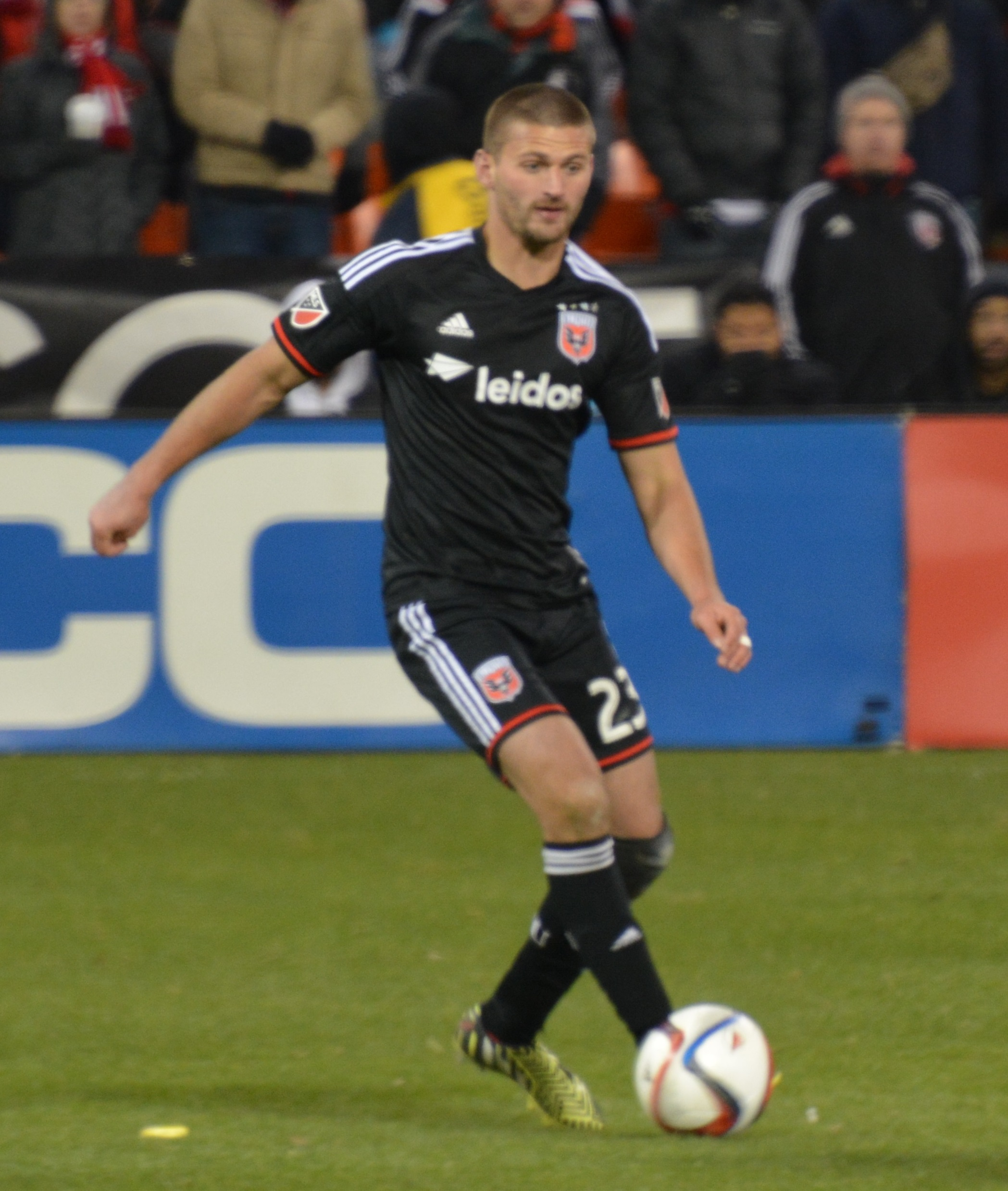
- Kitchen playing for D.C. United in 2015

Personal information
- Full name: Perry Allen Kitchen
- Date of birth: February 29, 1992 (age 34)
- Place of birth: Indianapolis, Indiana, U.S.
- Height: 6 ft 0 in (1.83 m)
- Position: Defensive midfielder

Youth career
- Chicago Magic SC

College career
Years	Team	Apps	(Gls)
2010	Akron Zips	25	(6)

Senior career*
Years	Team	Apps	(Gls)
2010	Chicago Fire Premier	1	(0)
2011–2015	D.C. United	158	(10)
2016–2017	Heart of Midlothian	39	(0)
2017–2018	Randers	17	(0)
2018–2020	LA Galaxy	60	(0)
2021–2022	Columbus Crew	5	(0)
Total		280	(10)

International career^{‡}
2007–2009	United States U17	34	(0)
2010–2011	United States U20	8	(0)
2012	United States U23	5	(0)
2015–2016	United States	5	(0)
- * Club domestic league appearances and goals as of 03:34, 25 July 2021 (UTC) ‡ National team caps and goals as of October 11, 2016

Perry Allen Kitchen (born February 29, 1992) is an American former professional soccer player who played as a defensive midfielder.

Kitchen was part of the Akron Zips side that won the 2010 NCAA Division I Men's Soccer Championship, and was a first-round draft pick (3rd overall) for D.C. United in the 2011 MLS SuperDraft. He played 187 total games and scored 10 goals for D.C., and won the 2013 Lamar Hunt U.S. Open Cup. In March 2016, he moved to Heart of Midlothian of the Scottish Premiership, who appointed him their captain. After six months with Randers of the Danish Superliga, he returned to MLS with the LA Galaxy in January 2018. Three years later, he joined the Columbus Crew of the same league.

Kitchen was captain of the United States men's national under-17 soccer team at the 2009 FIFA U-17 World Cup in Nigeria. He made his senior international debut in February 2015 and was part of the squad that came fourth at the Copa América Centenario.

== College and amateur ==
Born in Indianapolis, Indiana, Kitchen was signed up for soccer by his mother and quickly excelled in the sport, as his local league made him play two age groups higher due to his ability. Two years later he was signed to the Chicago Magic, a team in the U.S. Soccer Development Academy, while remaining in Indiana. He was invited to spend two years in the United States men's national under-17 soccer team camp in Bradenton, Florida, and captained the team at the 2009 FIFA U-17 World Cup in Nigeria.

In 2010, he enrolled at University of Akron and played a season for the Akron Zips, who won the 2010 NCAA Division I Men's Soccer Championship under Caleb Porter with other future MLS players such as Darlington Nagbe. He started 25 games for the Zips in 2010, scoring six goals and adding one assist. He earned an All-MAC First Team selection and scored an unassisted goal on a right-footed blast from 30 yards out during Akron's 2–1 win over the Michigan Wolverines in the national semifinal of the College Cup.

Kitchen also made a solitary appearance for USL Premier Development League club Chicago Fire Premier in 2010.

== Professional career ==
=== D.C. United ===
Kitchen passed on a trial offer from Belgium's Anderlecht to sign a Generation Adidas contract with MLS. He was selected by D.C. United in the first round (3rd overall) of the 2011 MLS SuperDraft. He made his professional debut on March 19, 2011, in United's 2011 MLS season opener against the Columbus Crew, and scored his first professional goal on May 29 in a 3–2 win over the Portland Timbers. Perry was a finalist for the 2011 Rookie of the Year award, although he was ultimately not selected.

He recorded 4 assists for the season of 2013, which was the record high for the team that year. He was voted D.C. United's Most Valuable Player of the 2013 season. He played all five matches of their 2013 U.S. Open Cup win, including the 1–0 final victory at Real Salt Lake on October 1.

Kitchen's deal with D.C. United expired after the 2015 season.

=== Europe ===
Kitchen signed with Heart of Midlothian on a two-and-a-half-year deal on March 9, 2016. He made his debut in the Scottish Premiership three days later in a 1–0 win at Dundee, as a 73rd-minute substitute for Sam Nicholson.

On September 21, 2016, Kitchen was appointed club captain. Kitchen played less often after Ian Cathro was appointed Hearts manager, and he was allowed to leave the club at the end of the season.

Kitchen signed for Danish Superliga club Randers on a two-year deal in July 2017.

=== LA Galaxy ===
Kitchen returned to the United States when he signed with LA Galaxy in January 2018. LA acquired his MLS rights from D.C. United in exchange for $100,000 in general allocation money and $200,000 in targeted allocation money. He made his debut on March 4 in the season opener, a 2–1 win over Portland. After the 2020 season, Kitchen was out of contract.

=== Columbus Crew ===
On January 28, 2021, Kitchen signed with the Columbus Crew as a free-agent. On April 15, 2021, Kitchen made his debut for the Crew in a CONCACAF Champions League match against Real Esteli. After playing in the first match of the 2021 MLS season, Kitchen suffered an injury to his right hamstring and did not appear again for the Black and Gold until July 9, starting against FC Cincinnati. On August 19, the club announced that Kitchen had undergone successful back surgery for a herniated disc, which ended his 2021 MLS campaign after three starts and five total appearances.

On October 26, 2022, Kitchen announced his retirement from professional soccer on his personal Instagram account.

== International ==
Kitchen, who captained the United States men's national under-17 soccer team at the 2009 FIFA U-17 World Cup in Nigeria, also played with the under-20 team.

On January 9, 2015, Kitchen was called to the senior training camp for the first time. He made his first international appearance on February 8 that year against Panama at the StubHub Center, replacing the injured DeAndre Yedlin for the last 22 minutes of a 2–0 win.

He was part of the 23-man squad that Jürgen Klinsmann called up for the Copa América Centenario on home soil in May 2016. The team came fourth, though he did not play.

== Career statistics ==
=== Club ===
As of July 18, 2021

Appearances and goals by club, season and competition
Club	Season	League			National cup		League cup		Continental		Total	
Club	Season	Division	Apps	Goals	Apps	Goals	Apps	Goals	Apps	Goals	Apps	Goals
Chicago Fire Premier	2010	PDL	1	0	0	0	0	0	0	0	1	0
D.C. United	2011	Major League Soccer	31	1	0	0	0	0	0	0	31	1
D.C. United	2012	Major League Soccer	36	0	2	0	4	0	0	0	42	0
D.C. United	2013	Major League Soccer	31	1	5	0	0	0	0	0	36	1
D.C. United	2014	Major League Soccer	33	5	0	0	2	0	1	0	36	5
D.C. United	2015	Major League Soccer	36	3	0	0	3	0	3	0	42	3
D.C. United	Total		167	10	7	0	9	0	4	0	187	10
Heart of Midlothian	2015–16	Scottish Premiership	10	0	0	0	0	0	—		10	0
Heart of Midlothian	2016–17	Scottish Premiership	29	0	3	0	0	0	3	0	35	0
Heart of Midlothian	Total		39	0	3	0	0	0	3	0	45	0
Randers	2017–18	Danish Superliga	17	0	1	0	—		—		18	0
Randers	Total		17	0	1	0	—		—		18	0
LA Galaxy	2018	Major League Soccer	31	0	1	0	0	0	0	0	32	0
LA Galaxy	2019	Major League Soccer	8	0	2	0	2	0	0	0	12	0
LA Galaxy	2020	Major League Soccer	21	0	0	0	0	0	0	0	21	0
LA Galaxy	Total		60	0	3	0	2	0	0	0	65	0
Columbus Crew	2021	Major League Soccer	5	0	0	0	0	0	2	0	7	0
Columbus Crew	Total		5	0	0	0	0	0	2	0	7	0
Career total			288	10	14	0	11	0	9	0	322	10

=== International ===
Appearances and goals by national team and year
National team	Year	Apps	Goals
United States	2015	2	0
United States	2016	3	0
Total		5	0

== Honors ==
Akron Zips

- NCAA Men's Division I Soccer Championship: 2010
- Mid-American Conference Regular Season: 2010
- Mid-American Conference Tournament: 2010

D.C. United

- Lamar Hunt U.S. Open Cup: 2013

United States

- Milk Cup U-20 Tournament: 2010
