= Facundo Coria =

Argentine footballer

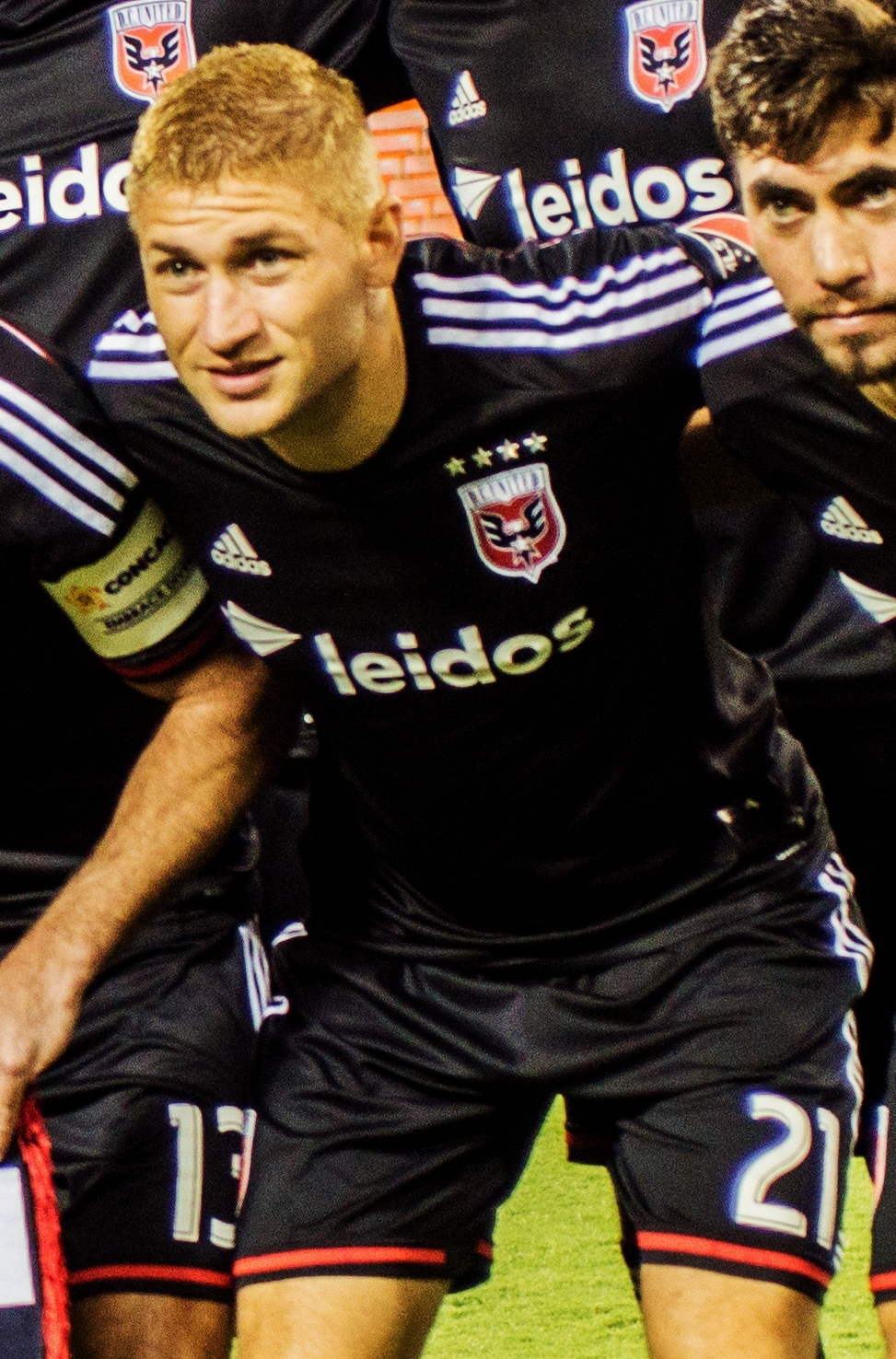

Personal information
- Full name: Facundo Gabriel Coria
- Date of birth: 28 May 1987 (age 39)
- Place of birth: Buenos Aires, Argentina
- Height: 1.80 m (5 ft 11 in)
- Position: Attacking midfielder

Team information
- Current team: Casarano

Youth career
- 2004–2007: Vélez Sársfield

Senior career*
Years	Team	Apps	(Gls)
2007–2010	Vélez Sársfield	18	(2)
2008	→ Arsenal de Sarandí (loan)	10	(1)
2009	→ Emelec (loan)	22	(3)
2009–2010	→ Argentinos Juniors (loan)	33	(5)
2010–2015	Villarreal B	15	(3)
2011	→ Pachuca (loan)	6	(0)
2011–2012	Estudiantes	10	(0)
2012	Colo-Colo	12	(0)
2013–2014	Argentinos Juniors	11	(0)
2015–2016	D.C. United	7	(0)
2016–2017	Quilmes	12	(0)
2017–2018	Sportivo Estudiantes	13	(0)
2019	Monagas	9	(1)
2019–2021	FC Messina	44	(11)
2021–	Casarano	0	(0)
- * Club domestic league appearances and goals as of 12:03, 30 August 2021 (UTC)

Facundo Gabriel Coria (Spanish pronunciation: [faˈkundo ˈkoɾja]; born 28 May 1987) is an Argentine footballer who plays for Italian club Casarano.

== Career ==
Coria made his league debut on 18 February 2007 for Vélez Sársfield in a 2–2 draw with Racing Club. Since then he has had several loan spells with other clubs. He joined Arsenal de Sarandí in 2008, CS Emelec of Ecuador in 2009 and Argentinos Juniors between 2009 and 2010.

While at Argentinos he was an important member of the team that won the Clausura 2010 championship, having played in 16 of the club's 19 games and scored four goals during the championship winning campaign. Coria scored the decisive goal in Argentinos Juniors' 2–1 away win against Huracán on the last day of the season to secure the championship ahead of title rivals Estudiantes.

Coria joined Villarreal B on July 1, 2010, for a $846k transfer price. Coria was loaned to CF Pachuca in early 2011 and returned in June after making 6 appearances.

On July 1, 2011, Coria signed with Estudiantes.

Coria joined Chilean team, Colo-Colo in a free transfer on June 25, 2012.

On August 5, 2013, Coria returned to Argentina, joining the Argentinos Juniors.

Coria signed with D.C. United on May 18, 2015. During his time with DC he played 7 games and recorded one assist. His contract was waived on December 7, 2015.

After being left without a club, Coria joined Quilmes on August 9, 2016.

Coria joined Sportivo Estudiantes on September 19, 2017.

On January 1, 2019, Coria joined Venezuelan side, Monagas SC.

Coria joined Italian Serie D club FC Messina on August 29, 2019.

He left FC Messina in August 2021 to join another Serie D club, Casarano.

== Honours ==
=== Club ===
Arsenal de Sarandí

- Suruga Bank Cup (1): 2008

Argentinos Juniors

- Torneo de Clausura (1): 2010
