= Travis Worra =

American soccer player

Personal information
- Full name: Travis Worra
- Date of birth: April 9, 1993 (age 33)
- Place of birth: Lancaster, Pennsylvania, United States
- Height: 1.90 m (6 ft 3 in)
- Position: Goalkeeper

Youth career
- 2007–2010: PA Classics

College career
Years	Team	Apps	(Gls)
2011–2014	New Hampshire Wildcats	60	(0)

Senior career*
Years	Team	Apps	(Gls)
2012–2013	Seacoast United Phantoms	4	(0)
2014	Carolina RailHawks U-23's	10	(0)
2015–2018	D.C. United	19	(0)
2015–2018	→ Richmond Kickers (loan)	38	(0)
Total		71	(0)
- * Club domestic league appearances and goals

Travis Worra (born April 9, 1993) is an American retired professional soccer player. He played for D.C. United and Richmond Kickers during his professional career and appeared at the semi-professional level with Seacoast United Phantoms and Carolina RailHawks U-23's.

== Youth and college ==
Worra led Hempfield High School to the PIAA Class AAA State title in 2010. As a senior, Worra compiled a school-record 157 saves on his way to 19 shutouts and a .357 goals against average. Worra was named the Lancaster-Lebanon League Goalkeeper of the Year for the second straight year. He had similar success in the classroom, earning honor roll status all four years, while also earning the Senior Soccer Scholar Award for having the highest GPA on the team as a senior. Worra played club soccer in the U.S. Soccer Development Academy for PA Classics. Prior to his time in the Development Academy, Worra was also a three-time EPA Olympic Development Program player.

== Club career ==
Worra began his senior career as a backup goalie for the Seacoast United Phantoms. Garnering only four starts in his two seasons, Worra left the Phantoms to join the U-23 team of the Carolina RailHawks FC during the 2014 campaign. Worra made all 10 starts for the U-23 squad.

Although Worra was not drafted in the 2015 MLS SuperDraft, he went on trial with D.C. United. On February 25, 2015, he was signed as a free agent as the third string goalkeeper. Immediately after, he was sent on loan to Richmond Kickers, where he made his professional debut on April 4, 2014, in a 1–1 draw against Louisville City FC.

Worra made his first appearance for DC United on April 25, 2015, against the Vancouver Whitecaps, when starting goalie Andrew Dykstra injured his ankle around the 58th minute of the match and had to be subbed off. He maintained a clean sheet from that point on and helped DC win 2–1.

In 2016, Worra became the starting goalkeeper for DC United by the second game of the season, as Bill Hamid and Dykstra both suffered injuries that would require surgery and several months of recovery. During his first official start for the team on March 12 of that year, he kept a clean sheet against the New England Revolution in a 0–0 draw. Worra was nominated for Save of the Week for his performance on May 13, 2016, in a game against New York City FC.

In 2018, Worra was the primary goalkeeper of the Richmond Kickers.

Worra's contract with D.C. United ended after the 2018 season. In his 22 appearances for D.C. United, he recorded 6 clean-sheets. On February 12, 2019, Worra announced on his personal Twitter account that he was retiring from professional soccer.
