= José Guillermo Ortiz =

Costa Rican footballer (born 1992)

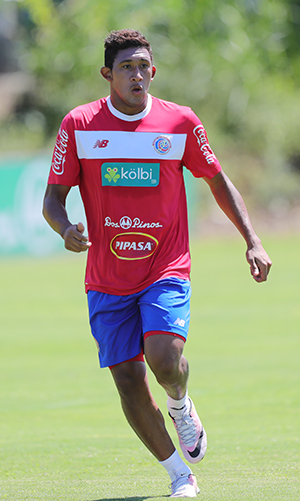

Personal information
- Full name: José Guillermo Ortiz Picado
- Date of birth: 20 June 1992 (age 34)
- Place of birth: Uruca, Costa Rica
- Height: 1.80 m (5 ft 11 in)
- Position: Forward

Team information
- Current team: Herediano
- Number: 77

Youth career
- 2008–2013: Alajuelense

Senior career*
Years	Team	Apps	(Gls)
2013–2017	Alajuelense	140	(33)
2017–	Herediano	92	(30)
2017	→ D.C. United (loan)	16	(1)
2019–2020	→ Millonarios (loan)	19	(8)
2020	→ Ho Chi Minh City (loan)	6	(1)
2021	→ Deportes Tolima (loan)	16	(0)

International career^{‡}
2017–	Costa Rica	21	(3)
- * Club domestic league appearances and goals as of 5 March 2022 ‡ National team caps and goals as of 27 January 2022

José Guillermo Ortiz Picado (born 20 June 1992) is a Costa Rican international footballer who plays as a forward for Costa Rican club Herediano.

== Club career ==
=== Alajuelense ===
Ortiz spent four seasons in Alajuelense. He scored 15 goals for Alajuelense in 2016.

=== Herediano ===
On January 1, 2017, Ortiz joined Herediano.

=== D.C. United ===
On 18 December 2016, Ortiz was loaned to D.C. United in MLS with an option to buy.

He scored his first MLS goal on April 1, 2017, scoring in the 18th minute against the Philadelphia Union.

On 30 May 2017, Ortiz was suspended for one game by Major League Soccer for simulation that led to a decisive penalty in a game against the Vancouver Whitecaps.

He was released by D.C. United on 12 July 2017.

=== Millonarios ===
Ortiz joined Colombian side Millonarios on August 6, 2019, on loan from his club Herediano. On August 11, he debuted for the club in the game against Atlético Huila. He scored his first goals on August 14 against Independiente Medellín in 2019 Copa Colombia.

He scored his first goal in 2020 against La Equidad in a 2–2 draw, previously he scored his first hat-tricks in Colombia also against the same opponent.

=== Ho Chi Minh City ===
In July 2020, he made a surprise decision by confirmed joining the Vietnamese side Ho Chi Minh City FC, becoming the first full Costa Rican international players, alongside teammate Ariel Francisco Rodríguez, to play in Vietnam.

== International career ==
Ortiz was named to the 23-man squad for the 2017 Copa Centroamericana, making it his first call-up to the senior national team. In Ortiz's debut, he scored twice, in a 3–0 victory over Belize.

=== International goals ===
Scores and results list Costa Rica's goal tally first.

No.	Date	Venue	Opponent	Score	Result	Competition
1.	15 January 2017	Estadio Rommel Fernández, Panama City, Panama	Belize	1–0	3–0	2017 Copa Centroamericana
2.	15 January 2017	Estadio Rommel Fernández, Panama City, Panama	Belize	2–0	3–0	2017 Copa Centroamericana
3.	10 October 2019	Thomas Robinson Stadium, Nassau, Bahamas	Haiti	1–0	1–1	2019–20 CONCACAF Nations League A

== Career statistics ==
As of 5 January 2017

Club	Season	League			Cup		League Cup		Other^{[A]}		Total	
Club	Season	Division	Apps	Goals	Apps	Goals	Apps	Goals	Apps	Goals	Apps	Goals
Costa Rica			League		Costa Rica Cup		FPD Playoffs		North America		Total	
Alajuelense	2012–13	Primera División	9	2	0	0	0	0	—		9	2
Alajuelense	2013–14	Primera División	24	6	0	0	0	0	3	0	27	6
Alajuelense	2014–15	Primera División	32	4	0	0	0	0	5	2	37	5
Alajuelense	2015–16	Primera División	48	17	0	0	0	0	—		48	17
Alajuelense	2016–17	Primera División	27	4	0	0	0	0	—		27	4
Herediano	2016–17	Primera División	0	0	0	0	0	0	—		0	0
United States			League		US Open Cup		MLS Cup		North America		Total	
D.C. United (loan)	2017	MLS	0	0	0	0	0	0	—		0	0
Total	Costa Rica		140	33	0	0	0	0	8	2	148	35
Total	United States		0	0	0	0	0	0	0	0	0	0
Career statistics			140	33	0	0	0	0	8	2	148	35
