= Jalen Robinson =

American soccer player (born 1994)

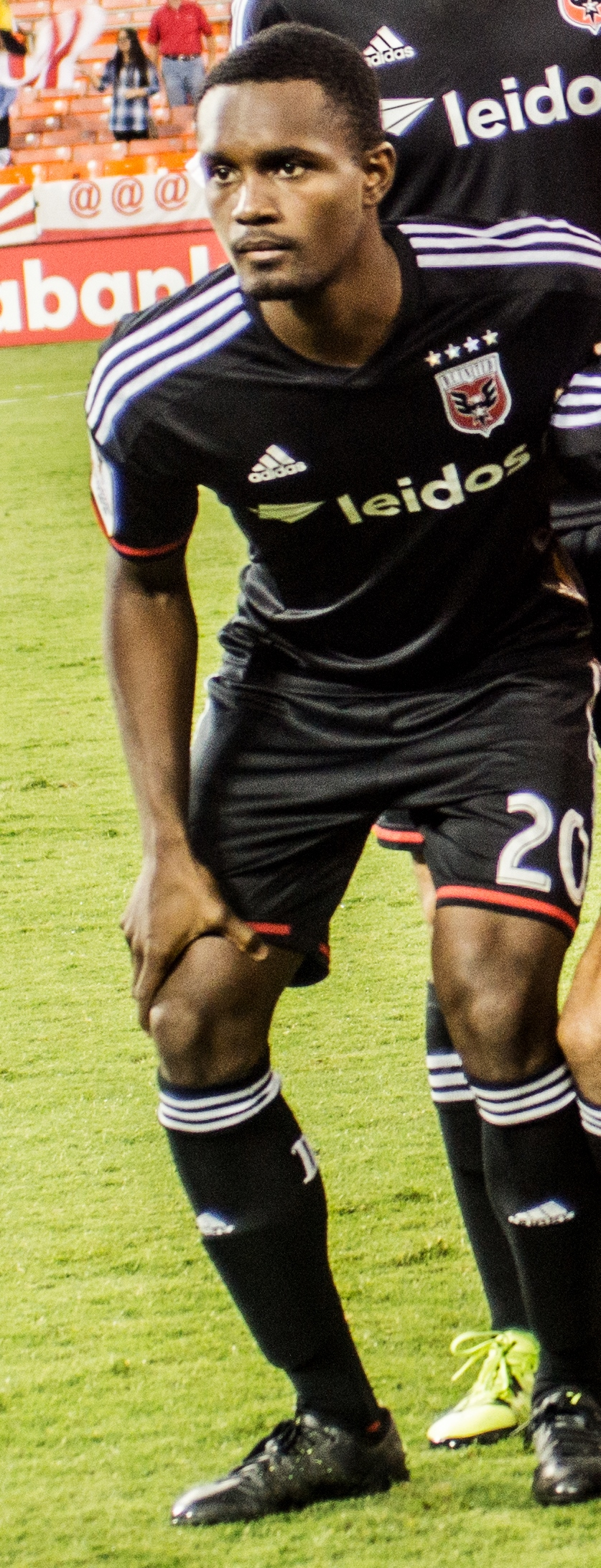

Personal information
- Date of birth: May 8, 1994 (age 32)
- Place of birth: Catonsville, Maryland, United States
- Height: 1.83 m (6 ft 0 in)
- Position: Defender

Youth career
- Bethesda SC
- 2009–2012: D.C. United

College career
Years	Team	Apps	(Gls)
2012–2013	Wake Forest Demon Deacons	36	(2)

Senior career*
Years	Team	Apps	(Gls)
2014–2019	D.C. United	26	(0)
2014	→ Richmond Kickers (loan)	3	(0)
2014	→ Arizona United (loan)	19	(0)
2015–2017	→ Richmond Kickers (loan)	18	(1)
2021	Pittsburgh Riverhounds	18	(0)
2022	Loudoun United	23	(1)
2023	Detroit City	10	(0)

International career^{‡}
2010–2011	United States U18	5	(1)
- * Club domestic league appearances and goals as of October 17, 2023 ‡ National team caps and goals as of April 28, 2014

Jalen Robinson (born May 8, 1994) is an American former professional soccer player who played as defender.

== Youth and amateur soccer ==
Robinson grew up in the Washington metropolitan area, and played for Bethesda SC in Maryland, before signing on with D.C. United's academy. After two years of playing for the academy, Robinson opted to forgo a professional contract and signed a scholarship to play college soccer at Wake Forest University. Robinson was a two-year starter for the Wake Forest Demon Deacons men's soccer program, where he earned the All-ACC Second Team in 2013.

== Professional career ==
Robinson signed a homegrown contract with MLS club D.C. United on January 6, 2014. In March 2014, he was loaned to USL Pro affiliate club Richmond Kickers. His professional debut and only appearance for the Kickers came on April 26 in a 5–1 victory over the Dayton Dutch Lions. After six weeks in Richmond and unable to find much playing time, D.C. United recalled Robinson and loaned him to Arizona United. With Arizona, Robinson made 14 appearances for the club.

Ahead of the 2015 season, Robinson was loaned out once again to Richmond. On March 28, 2015, in the first game of the 2015 USL season, Robinson scored his first professional goal in a 2–2 draw against Wilmington Hammerheads FC.

Robinson made his D.C. United debut on June 19, 2016, coming on against the Houston Dynamo as a late game substitute. Robinson played in the following game against the New England Revolution, lifting a depleted D.C. United defensive back line to 2–0 shutout in his first MLS start. Robinson was credited with three blocked shots, five recoveries, seven clearances, four interceptions and two tackles while completing 85.7% of his passes. Fans and teammates alike commented that his performance made him a Man of the Match contender.

Robinson's contract with D.C. United ended after the 2019 season.

On May 21, 2021, Robinson signed with USL Championship club Pittsburgh Riverhounds SC.

Robinson joined USL Championship side Loudoun United FC on May 25, 2022.

Robinson made the move to USL Championship side Detroit City on February 2, 2023, joining on a one-year deal. He left Detroit following their 2023 season.
