= Luke Mishu =

American soccer player

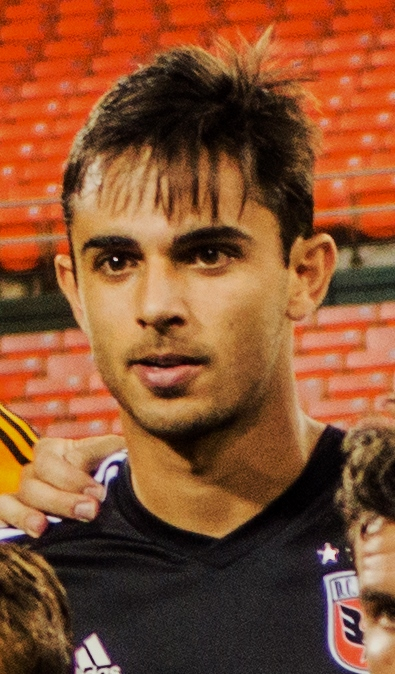

Personal information
- Date of birth: June 26, 1991 (age 35)
- Place of birth: Knoxville, Tennessee, U.S.
- Height: 1.83 m (6 ft 0 in)
- Position: Defender

College career
Years	Team	Apps	(Gls)
2010–2014	Notre Dame Fighting Irish	65	(0)

Senior career*
Years	Team	Apps	(Gls)
2015–2016	D.C. United	9	(0)
2015	→ Richmond Kickers (loan)	11	(0)
2016	→ Richmond Kickers (loan)	9	(0)
- * Club domestic league appearances and goals as of November 1, 2016

Luke Mishu (born June 26, 1991) is an American retired soccer player who last played for D.C. United in Major League Soccer.

== Career ==
=== College ===
Mishu spent his entire college career at the University of Notre Dame. He made a total of 75 appearances for the Fighting Irish and tallied 12 assists.

=== Professional ===
Mishu went undrafted in the 2015 MLS SuperDraft. On March 6, 2015, he signed a professional contract with D.C. United. Two weeks later, he was sent on loan to USL affiliate club Richmond Kickers. He made his professional debut on March 28 in a 2–2 draw against the Wilmington Hammerheads.

Mishu announced his retirement from the game on December 6, 2016, in hopes of pursuing a business career.
