= Taylor Kemp =

American soccer player (born 1990)

Personal information
- Full name: Taylor Eric Kemp
- Date of birth: July 23, 1990 (age 36)
- Place of birth: Highlands Ranch, Colorado, United States
- Height: 5 ft 11 in (1.80 m)
- Position: Left-back

Youth career
- 2007–2009: Real Colorado

College career
Years	Team	Apps	(Gls)
2009–2012	Maryland Terrapins	78	(2)

Senior career*
Years	Team	Apps	(Gls)
2011–2012	Real Colorado Foxes	11	(4)
2013–2018	D.C. United	101	(3)
2013	→ Richmond Kickers (loan)	5	(0)
2014	→ Richmond Kickers (loan)	5	(0)
Total		122	(7)

International career
2008	United States U18	1	(0)
2008	United States U20	1	(0)
- * Club domestic league appearances and goals

Taylor Eric Kemp (born July 23, 1990) is an American former professional soccer player who played as a left-back.

== Career ==
=== College and amateur ===
Kemp played college soccer at the University of Maryland between 2009 and 2012.

=== Professional ===
Kemp was drafted 17th overall by D.C. United in the 2013 MLS SuperDraft. Upon a trial with United, Kemp was offered a contract. Due to team depth and the unlikeliness of many first team minutes, Kemp was loaned to United's USL Pro-affiliated, Richmond Kickers of the third tier. On April 6, 2013, in a match between Richmond and the Pittsburgh Riverhounds, Kemp started and played 90 minutes. Ahead of the April 27 fixture against Columbus, D.C. United recalled Kemp from loan.

The beginning of the 2014 MLS season saw Kemp primarily making appearances from the United bench and in Richmond, until August, when he was inserted into the United starting lineup at left back due to an injury to Chris Korb. From August on, Kemp locked down a starting position in the United lineup, creating two assists against the Colorado Rapids on August 7 and scoring a goal against the Houston Dynamo on October 12.

In the 2015 season, Kemp started 25 of United's 34 regular season matches. He contributed 6 assists as well as 1 goal, a long-range volley that won the MLS Goal of the Week award for Week 22.

During the 2018 season, Kemp struggled with injuries and didn't appear in any games.

On November 7, 2018, Kemp announced his retirement from playing professional soccer. At the time of his retirement, he was one of the only 24 players in D.C. United history to reach a 100-game milestone. In his career for D.C. United, he played 101 games, scored 3 goals, and contributed 14 assists.

=== International ===
On January 6, 2017, for the first time Kemp was called for the United States national team by coach Bruce Arena.

== Honors ==
D.C. United

- Lamar Hunt U.S. Open Cup: 2013
