= Andrew Dykstra =

American soccer player

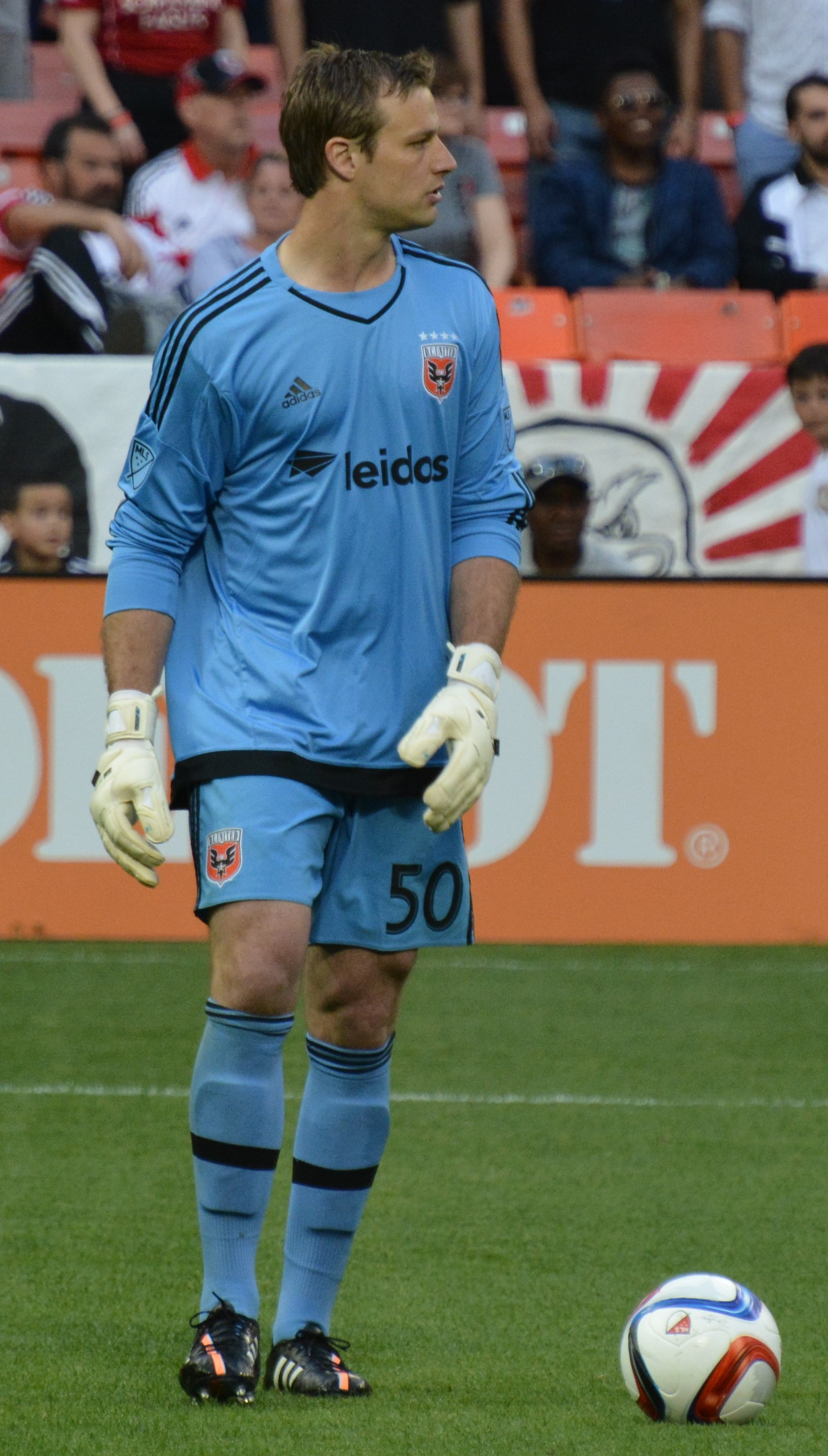
- Andrew Dykstra playing for DC United

Personal information
- Full name: Andrew Dykstra
- Date of birth: January 2, 1986 (age 40)
- Place of birth: Honolulu, Hawaii, U.S.
- Height: 6 ft 4 in (1.93 m)
- Position: Goalkeeper

College career
Years	Team	Apps	(Gls)
2004–2008	VCU Rams		

Senior career*
Years	Team	Apps	(Gls)
2005–2008	Richmond Kickers Future	45	(0)
2009–2010	Chicago Fire	17	(0)
2011	Charleston Battery	13	(0)
2012–2016	D.C. United	14	(0)
2012	→ Charleston Battery (loan)	19	(0)
2013	→ Richmond Kickers (loan)	22	(0)
2016	→ Richmond Kickers (loan)	8	(0)
2017	Sporting Kansas City	4	(0)
2017	→ Swope Park Rangers (loan)	3	(0)
2018	Colorado Rapids	0	(0)
2018	→ Charlotte Independence (loan)	22	(0)
Total		167	(0)
- * Club domestic league appearances and goals as of 09:54, 15 October 2018 (UTC)

Andrew Dykstra (/ˈdaɪkstrə/; born January 2, 1986) is an American former professional soccer player who played as a goalkeeper.

== Career ==
=== College and amateur ===
Dykstra grew up in Woodbridge, Virginia, attended Osbourn Park High School, and played college soccer at Virginia Commonwealth University from 2004 to 2008, redshirting in his first year. He was named to the CAA All-Rookie Team as a freshman in 2005, and played in all 18 matches for VCU in his senior season, being named to the All-CAA Second Team and recognized as the goalkeeper on the 2008 Scholar All-East Third Team.

During his college years Dykstra also played four seasons in the USL Premier Development League for Richmond Kickers Future.

=== Professional ===
Undrafted out of college, Dykstra was signed to Chicago Fire's developmental roster on April 6, 2009 and signed to a senior roster spot later in June 2009. He made his full professional debut for Fire on June 30, 2009, in a US Open Cup third-round game against Wilmington Hammerheads.

Dykstra became the Fire's number one goalkeeper just prior to the 2010 season, when the new coaching staff, in a surprise last-minute move, chose to waive starting goalkeeper Jon Busch. He made his MLS debut on March 27, 2010, in Chicago's 2010 season opener against the New York Red Bulls

On January 31, 2011, the Fire announced that they released Dykstra after two seasons with the club. Dykstra signed with Charleston Battery of the USL Pro league on March 23, 2011.

On August 12, 2011, Dykstra was named Most Valuable Player at the final league game of the regular season, in recognition for his successful season in which he led the USL Pro League in lowest Goals Against Average and fewest goals allowed.

During the 2014 season, Dykstra started for the first time in the MLS since 2010 for three matches to replace injured goalkeeper Bill Hamid. Dykstra performed "admirably" allowing only one goal. Later in the same season, Dykstra started for a friendly game against Fulham FC where he suffered a ruptured Achilles and was ruled out for the rest of the season.

Following his release from D.C. United at the end of the 2016 season, Dykstra was selected by Sporting Kansas City in the 2016 MLS Re-Entry Draft Stage 2.

On February 8, 2018, Dykstra was traded by Sporting Kansas City to Colorado Rapids in exchange for a second-round pick in the 2020 MLS SuperDraft. Dykstra was released by Colorado at the end of their 2018 season.

In March 2019, Dykstra retired from professional soccer.

== Personal life ==
Dykstra enjoys homebrewing in his personal time. After retiring from professional soccer, Dykstra took a job for Prince William Soccer in Virginia.
