= 2016 D.C. United season =

D.C. United
2016 season
- General manager: Dave Kasper
- Head coach: Ben Olsen
- Stadium: RFK Stadium
- MLS: Conference: 4th Overall: 9th
- MLS Cup Playoffs: Knockout round
- U.S. Open Cup: Fourth round
- CONCACAF Champions League (15–16): Quarterfinals
- Atlantic Cup: Winners
- Top goalscorer: League: Lamar Neagle (9); All: Lamar Neagle (9)
- Highest home attendance: 30,943 (Oct 16 vs. NYCFC)
- Lowest home attendance: League: 14,088 (Apr 9 vs. Toronto); All: 10,790 (Mar 1 vs. Querétaro)
- Average home league attendance: League: 15,061; All: 14,451
Home colors	Away colors

The 2016 D.C. United season was the club's twenty-first season of existence, and their twenty-first in Major League Soccer, the top flight of American soccer.

The 2016 season began in February 2016, with United playing Liga MX club, Querétaro, in the quarterfinal series of the 2015–16 CONCACAF Champions League. United ultimately lost 1–3 on aggregate to Querétaro and were eliminated in the quarterfinals of the Champions League for the second consecutive season. United began the Major League regular season winless in their first five matches, before winning at home 4–0 to Vancouver Whitecaps FC. Through the spring and summer, United maintained a playoff bubble position in the Eastern Conference table. Additionally, during this time, United was bumped from the fourth round of the 2016 U.S. Open Cup by NASL club, Fort Lauderdale Strikers. In the fall, United went on a regular season surge, which saw the Black-and-Red win four of their final five games, allowing them to finish fourth in the Eastern Conference and tied for ninth overall. This resulted in United qualifying for the MLS Cup Playoffs for the third consecutive season. In the preliminary round of the 2016 MLS Cup Playoffs, United lost at home to Montreal Impact, 2–4. The late October loss in the MLS Cup Playoffs was United's last competitive game of the year.

United's top scorers during the campaign came from newcomers, both of whom had previous played for MLS franchises: Lamar Neagle from Seattle Sounders FC lead the team with 10 goals across all competitions. Mid-season signee, Patrick Mullins, from New York City FC had eight goals during the campaign. Additionally, newcomer Luciano Acosta, a loanee from Boca Juniors lead United during the 2016 season with 11 assists across all competitions.

== Background ==
=== Preseason ===
==== January ====
D.C. United entered 2016 in desperate need of a makeover in midfield. The team traded winger Chris Pontius to the Philadelphia Union, they were unable to reach a new agreement with long-time central midfielder Perry Kitchen. Kitchen's central midfield partner, Davy Arnaud seemed unlikely to make a recovery from a concussion suffered in September 2015. Also Michael Farfan was released. Although the team traded for two wingers, Lamar Neagle and Patrick Nyarko, they were still in need of help in the center of the pitch. At the 2016 MLS SuperDraft, the team traded up two positions to select a Generation Adidas player from Syracuse University, midfielder Julian Buescher. The team then traded its own first round selection for a pick in the second round along with TAM money. The team used the pick to Select another midfielder, from 2015 NCAA Division I Men's Soccer Championship Game runner-up Clemson University, Paul Clowes. However, the team was still in search of more experienced players, and stories began surfacing that the team was trying to sign various foreign midfielders, including Leonardo Gil and Antonio Nocerino. The biggest news of the preseason, though, was probably the announcement that the team's star player, goalkeeper Bill Hamid had reinjured his knee during the off-season and was forced to have knee surgery that was expected to sideline him for several months.

==== February ====
Having set their sights on A.C. Milan player Antonio Nocerino, D.C. United found their negotiation was undermined when Orlando City S.C.'s Kaka apparently convinced his former teammate to reject United's offer and pursue a contract with Orlando. Fortunately, a plan B quickly emerged. The team filled the holding mid slot by trading for MLS veteran Marcelo Sarvas, and got a bit of an unexpected boost when the name of a former acquisition target, Boca Junior's midfielder/forward Luciano Acosta suddenly showed up on the transfer rumor wires. Within a week, United had the diminutive midfielder signed and training in their Florida pre-season camp. The next day, Acosta even assisted on the lone goal in a match against Tampa Bay Rowdies. Reportedly, United agreed to a trade of a conditional draft pick to New York Red Bulls, who had gained discovery claim priority on Acosta, after United had relinquished its own. As preseason continued, the team released Conor Doyle to make way for a trialist from USL side Pittsburgh Riverhounds, winger Rob Vincent. United took to the pitch for the first time in 2016, with a 2015–16 CONCACAF Champions League quarterfinal series against Querétaro F.C. In a match in the Mexican mountain city, D.C. United mostly held its own. But, missed chances by the visitors opened the door for the home team, which scored twice in the final 20 minutes, to take a daunting 2–0 lead in the series.

==== March ====
For the second straight year, the D.C. team bowed out in the quarterfinals of CONCACAF play. An away goal in the 4th minute locked up the series for Querétaro, but United did manage to reclaim some dignity with an impressive late strike for a goal by rookie Julian Büscher. Unable to practice with the team because of lingering post-concussion symptoms, Davy Arnaud retired from playing and joined the coaching staff. Because he had a guaranteed contract, Arnaud's retirement was not expected to free up any salary cap space, but it did open a roster spot. United made a trade to acquire the rights to U.S. youth international goalkeeper, Charlie Horton, who had left his English team, Leeds United, to play closer to home.

=== MLS regular season ===
In its 2016 Major League Soccer season opener, D.C. United started off well with a goal by newcomer Lamar Neagle to take a 1–0 lead over the LA Galaxy in the fifth minute. However, the Galaxy stormed back in the second half, led by former MLS MVP Mike Magee, and crushed D.C. 4–1. As D.C. traveled to Foxboro to face the New England Revolution, Andrew Dykstra was forced to sit out with back spasms, and Fabian Espindola was nursing a tender hamstring. The match ended in a scoreless draw. Dykstra later turned out to need back surgery that would sideline him for 10–12 weeks, joining Hamid on the injury list and leaving the netminding duties up to sophomore keeper Travis Worra and the recently signed Horton.

DC hoped to bounce back in their home opener against the Colorado Rapids, but the team only managed a 1–1 draw thanks to Espindola coming off the bench and chipping a rebound into the net in the 80th minute. The following week, Steve Birnbaum and Álvaro Saborío were called up to their respective national teams in the US and Costa Rica. D.C. faced off against an FC Dallas side that was suffering even more losses from injury and national call-ups, but were crushed 3–0 after Dallas took advantage of multiple mistakes between Bobby Boswell and Kofi Opare, who filled in for Birnbaum.

=== April ===
D.C. United announced the signing of veteran MLS keeper Tally Hall to shore up their increasingly-wounded goalkeeping corps, which turned out to be a prescient move as Horton suffered a concussion during training and would not be ready in time for the next match. Still searching for their first victory of the season, D.C. instead found another draw in San Jose. Despite getting an early lead when Nyarko headed in a spectacular cross by Neagle, and seeing several miraculous saves from Worra, a mistake by Espindola late in the game quickly led to a game-tying goal by Adam Jahn. D.C. finally got its first win in 2016 when they returned home to face the Vancouver Whitecaps F.C. Espindola and Alvaro Saborio each scored a pair of goals, with the latter player's goals both assisted by Acosta late in the second half, to notch a 4–0 shutout. Unfortunately, the team's good fortune would be short-lived, when they allowed Sebastian Giovinco to score in the first minute of the very next game, leading to a 1–0 defeat against Toronto.

On April 20, the MLS Disciplinary Committee suddenly announced that they would suspend manager Ben Olsen and fine him $500 for stepping onto the field during the Toronto match. With Chad Ashton as their acting manager, D.C. bounced back in their very next match with a 3–0 victory against New England. Neagle opened the scoring for D.C. and Saborio closed it out with another late insurance goal, but the most memorable moment of the game came when Lucho Acosta scored a fabulous goal—a long distance chip over the goalie that struck the bottom of the crossbar and went in the net for Acosta's first goal in a D.C. United uniform. The goal also earned Acosta the MLS Goal of the Week honor. United closed out the month on the road against the Chicago Fire. The Fire scored first on a free kick late in the first half, but D/C was able to level the score when Nyarko headed home a cross from Acosta.

=== May ===
Despite missing several key players, D.C. United started off the month of May expecting three points in a home match against cellar-dwelling NYCFC, but the team missed some good chances to score in the first half and the visiting team punished them with 2 goals early in the second half, the first by Spanish star David Villa and the second by Khiry Shelton. 5 days later, D.C. hosted the other team from the New York region, the potent New York Red Bulls The biggest home crowd of the season turned out for this rivalry match, and the home team responded with a strong overall effort. Nyarko sent Sarvas in on goal with a terrific through ball, and Sarvas unselfishly sent a pass across the goal to a waiting Saborio, who had an easy tap-in to take the lead. Worra delivered with several spectacular saves to maintain United's lead, and the team closed out the first half with a spectacular goal, as Neagle served up a sharp cross that Nyarko was able to turn into a goal with an impressive outside of the foot volley shot that sealed the 2–0 win.

The team also made a couple of personnel changes during that short home-stand, acquiring a young striker from Sierra Leone, via Sweden, Alhaji Kamara. Kamara had been ruled out from UEFA competition due to the discovery of a congenital heart defect that was deemed to pose risk to the striker's life. However, cardiologists hired by both D.C. United and MLS decided Kamara was healthy enough to safely participate in the sport. To make room for Kamara, the team waived Clowes.

On the pitch, the team continued to struggle to produce offense, and dropped point when they surrendered a stoppage-point goal on a trip to the Philadelphia Union. Days after the 0–1 loss to the Union, the team announced that they had mutually parted ways with Markus Halsti, just as he was called up to the Finnish national team. Halsti had been plagued by injuries and fitness concerns, and only appeared in one match for the team in 2016, as a substitute in the second leg of the CCL against Querétaro.

On the 27th, despite furious storms that nearly scuttled the match, D.C. United managed to sneak away with a victory when the newly signed Kamara subbed in for Neagle in the 85th minute, and then scored his first goal for the team less than a minute later, giving his new team a 1–0 victory over Sporting KC.

=== June ===
United failed to build on the momentum of the Kansas City win, suffering a crushing 0–2 home loss to Seattle, on late goals by rookie Jordan Morris and Joevin Jones. The entire MLS went on break for the Copa América Centenario. Birnbaum and Saborio were called up to their respective national team squads for the US and Costa Rica. During the league break, the team made an unusual move, adding 16-year old youth national team captain Chris Durkin as a Homegrown Player signing. Durkin was one of the youngest signings in league history, but the unusual deal did not add Durkin to D.C. United's MLS roster. Instead, he was available to play in a U.S. Open Cup match the next day, and would go out on loan after the match, first to Richmond Kickers, and then to resume his residency with the national team program in Bradenton as least until the USA U-17s finished their run at the 2017 FIFA U-17 World Cup. Durkin did make his debut in the USOC match and by all accounts looked very much as if he belonged. However, the team was unable to break through against the Ft. Lauderdale Strikers defense, and the D.C. squad made a quick exit from the competition, after losing to the Strikers in a penalty kick shootout. When MLS league action resumed, United claimed 4 points in their final 2 matches of the month, including a dreary 0–0 draw in Houston that produced no excitement until stoppage time, when Bill Hamid was forced into two spectacular reaction saves. D.C. United turned in a stronger performance with some home cooking against the New England Revolution, as Neagle and Franklin turned in highlight reel goals, and the home team cruised to a 2–0 win.

=== July ===
July began with another impotent showing from the United offense in a place where the team had long ago become accustomed to losing. Despite repeated jaw-dropping heroics by goalie Hamid, United fell behind in Utah to home team Real Salt Lake on a 52nd-minute goal. United seemed resigned to another road loss at Rio Tinto Stadium until Jeffrey scored a header on a stoppage time corner kick to gain the surprise point. That result, however, seemed a distant memory the next week, when United traveled to the Philadelphia Union, and suffered the team's worst loss to that franchise, a 3-0 drubbing with 2 first-half penalty kick goals and a second yellow-card ejection for Opare. starting in place of captain Boswell, who had been beaten several times in the previous match against RSL.

D.C. United did bounce back the next week on a trip to Columbus. The game marked the first appearance for the D.C. side by long-time nemesis Lloyd Sam, acquired in a trade with the N.Y. Red Bulls. United seemed the more likely side for much of the match in Columbus, but surrendered a goal to the Crew's scoring sensation, Ola Kamara, in the 63rd minute. The D.C. team did catch a break 10 minutes later as Harrison Afful was shown a red card for a sliding challenge on Sarvas. That card was rescinded later by the Disciplinary Committee, but United was able to press the man advantage and gained a point when late substitute Fabian Espindola pounced on a loose ball and shot it past the reach of the Crew goalie. That thrilling moment proved to be the coda to Espindola's career with D.C. United as "Fabi" was traded the next week to the Vancouver Whitecaps in what amounted to a 3-way deal that saw former University of Maryland Terrapins star Patrick Mullins move from NYCFC to D.C. United, with the NYC side getting one of D.C.'s international roster slots. The acquisition of Mullins was one local fans had hoped for since the Hermann award winner left school.

The team's long July road trip finished in Toronto, where Worra started for an injured Hamid. It was a tough lesson for Worra, who was beat for two free kick goals by Sebastian Giovinco in a 4–1 loss. When the team finally returned to RFK, the newly acquired Mullins made his first start for United and put his new team ahead with a header, but the team surrendered a late tying goal to the visiting Montreal Impact, not long after Montreal's star striker Didier Drogba had been sent off for a dead ball foul. The match also marked the first appearance for United by Kennedy Igboananike, who had just been acquired in a trade with the Chicago Fire.

=== August ===
D.C.'s homestand continued with a match against the Eastern Conference leading Philadelphia Union. United took the lead when Kemp intercepted a pass in the defensive end, raced through the Union defense and beat the goalie to the far post. However, the Union tied the game on a free kick just before halftime. The visitors took the lead when Acosta was dispossessed as he tried to dribble out of the defensive end and former United star Chris Pontius continued a remarkable renaissance in his first season away from D.C. and put the Union ahead. United's coach, Ben Olsen was ejected late in the second half for protesting one of many uncalled fouls on Acosta. Despite missing their leader, United pushed hard for a tying goal. Despite having a couple of apparent goals waved off by the officials, the team finally found the tying goal in the fourth minute of stoppage time, when Birnbaum got his head on the end of a service into the box by Nyarko. Despite being only a draw, it was a very emotional goal for the players and fans, but the home draw meant the team remained outside of playoff contention.

After getting only 2 points on draws in the first two games of the four-game homestand, United was desperate for a win when Portland Timbers came to town. The start of the game was delayed an hour because of record-setting heat that exceeded 100 degrees (on the Fahrenheit scale), but United got off to a hot start themselves. An early corner was headed on by Boswell to Birnbaum, who took his chance on a sharp volley to give D.C. an early lead. The team doubled that lead in the 29th minute, just before a scheduled heat break, when Acosta finished a chance in front of goal, set up by a nifty chipped pass from Mullins. Thanks to the usual heroics by Hamid, the team held on for a 2–0 shutout win that lifted United ahead of New England and at least temporarily holding the sixth and final postseason spot in the East.

The four-game homestand concluded with a Sunday afternoon national TV game against arch-rivals New York Red Bulls. Despite a pre-game shower during warm-ups and with inclement weather approaching, the teams kicked off on time, but the game was stopped just shy of the 8:00 mark, because a powerful storm was about to settle over RFK. After the torrential rains eased somewhat, grounds-crew tried to remove some of the bigger puddles of water and play resumed after a delay of about an hour and a quarter. Despite epically sloppy conditions, United was able to create some excellent chances to score, but their finishing was not up to the task. NYRB punished the home team's mistakes when Bradley Wright-Phillips finished off a play that opened up when Franklin whiffed on an attempted clearance due to poor footing. The visitors extended their lead in the second half on a shot by Felipe. As the team had done 2 weeks earlier, a desperate United team was able to rally to gain a home draw. First, Marcelo Sarvas scored on a penalty kick, earned by Lloyd Sam, who was playing against his old team for the first time. The tying goal was scored on a header by Patrick Mullins after Birnbaum headed a long corner kick back into the box. With a mid-week trip to Montreal looming, United were clinging to the final post-season slot, holding a tiebreaker edge over Orlando City SC.

In Montreal, United got off to an early lead on a penalty kick goal by Neagle, but Neagle gave it away late in the match when his turnover in the defensive zone was quickly turned into the tying goal. Still, the point was enough to hold on to the playoff position spot in the table.

D.C. United closed out an unbeaten August with some good home cooking and a 6-2 drubbing of the cellar-dwelling Chicago Fire SC. Acosta opened the scoring in the 25th minute, finishing off a cross through the box from Sarvas. Against the run of play, Hamid surrendered the lead six minutes later, when he gave up a big rebound on a long shot and he was helpless to deny the follow-up shot. However, United was soon playing with a man advantage after a Fire player was ejected for dissent. Mullins then slotted home a Nyarko pass to put United ahead again, and just before halftime Mullins finished off a pass from Acosta to extend the lead to 2 goals. The Fire responded with a goal just before the whistle for halftime. However, in the second half, a Nyarko volley just got across the line to restore the two-goal lead. Mullins added another goal to get the first hat-trick of the year for United, and Deleon came off the bench to close out the 6–2 scoreline with a crisp shot past the outstretched Chicago goalie, which was Deleon's first goal of the year.

=== September ===
D.C. United opened September with a Thursday match in Yankee Stadium against NYCFC without Steven Birnbaum, who was called up to play in his first United States Men's National Soccer Team World Cup qualifying match. Jalen Robinson played well over the first hour ad a quarter, as D.C. protected a 1–0 lead gained when Sam finished off a play started by Acosta and assisted by Nyarko. However, an errant back-pass by Luke Mishu, found its way to David Villa, who easily beat Hamid. In the 85th minute, Villa received a ball in the box and he was taken down by Robinson. Advantage was played when Frank Lampard collected the loose ball and beat Hamid with a laser shot. United seemed to have recovered for a draw, when Neagle headed in a corner kick by Büscher in stoppage time. However, the defense couldn't slow down the NYCFC attack and Lampard was able to get Robinson to slide early and then took the open shot to give NYCFC the 3–2 win in the third minute of stoppage time. In addition to the disappointing result for the team, Acosta received a yellow card which mean he would miss the next match due to an accumulation of yellow cards.

Before the team's next match at NYRB, Andrea Mancini was released to join the New York Cosmos, freeing up an international roster slot, and allowing the team to activate Kamara, who had sat out over six weeks with a hamstring injury. Without Acosta, United seemed hopelessly overmatched by the potent NYRB in a match scheduled to honor the 15th anniversary of the September 11 attacks. Indeed, the Red Bulls went ahead in the first half following a Nyarko defensive turnover that led to a historic goal by Bradley Wright-Phillips, giving BWP the most goals over a 3-year stretch by any player in league history. In the second half, Wright-Phillips caught Hamid leaning towards the far post and slammed it past him to the near side, giving NY a 2–0 lead. The New York team only turned up the pressure, but Hamid responded with multiple highlight reel saves to keep his team in the match. In the 89th minute, a loose ball in the box came to Birnbaum, and he delivered with a shot that narrowed the gap to 2–1. Then, in the 5th minute of stoppage time, a loose ball in the box came to Neagle for an easy tap-in, and United emerged with a shocking draw against the run of play. The result was the first time that NYRB had ever surrendered a 2-goal lead in Red Bull Arena.

A short week two-game road trip concluded on a Friday in Chicago, where D.C. once again rescued a point in the final minutes. The game started brightly for the visitors, when they were awarded an indirect free kick just outside the Fire's 6-yard box. Rob Vincent scored his first MLS goal, with a blast through the defense, assisted by Acosta. However, the Fire responded quickly as Luke Mishu, playing for the injured Franklin, lost his mark on a corner kick and surrendered a header for goal. The Fire made it 2-0 not long thereafter, as David Accam dribbled around Birnbaum and took a long shot that found the corner of the goal. Down a goal, United turned in a tired display, and seemed destined for a defeat. As the game went into stoppage time, Mullins took a chance with a spectacular overhead volley that rang off the crossbar. The rebound went to Nyarko, who forced a save by the diving Sean Johnson, but Boswell headed that rebound in for the tying goal. The draw again put United ahead of Orlando City Soccer Club in the race for the final playoff position, – but only on the goal differential tiebreaker with a big home match against Orlando City looming the following weekend. Both teams actually trailed New England Revolution in that race, by two points, but the Revolution had played an additional game.

The match against Orlando City was a hit at the box office, as the official attendance at RFK Stadium exceeded 25,000 for the first time in years. D.C. rewarded the big home crowd with a fluid performance that produced a 4–1 win and gave United a cushion over the visitors in the playoff chase. Mullins opened the scoring in the 34th minute, getting a foot on a cross across the goalmouth from Kemp, which followed a nifty back heel from Nyarko that created Kemp's chance. Two goals in quick succession put the game out of reach early in the second half. Sam got a header on a cross by Kemp, who had his second assist of the match. That was followed by Mullins' second goal, when the striker collected a pass from Nyarko, slipped wide of a defender, and cut the ball back just inside the far post. Orlando did get one back on a free kick in the 72nd minute, but the rookie Julian Büscher, who subbed on for an injured Sarvas in the first half, capped off the scoring with a goal in the 90th minute. The goal was Büscher's first in MLS play.

The midweek match at home against Columbus Crew SC was almost the opposite. Rain earlier in the day and a rainy forecast resulted in a small, but enthusiastic crowd. The visitors controlled play over most of the first hour, but United began to assert itself and seized control when Acosta was able to deliver the ball to Sam just outside the six-yard box. Sam created a shooting lane and took advantage with a shot that put United in the lead, even as Neagle stood at midfield waiting to come on for Sam. Fifteen minutes later, it was Neagle whose shot found the back of the net. He finished off a play that began when Nyarko got on the end of a long kick by Hamid and passed to Büscher. Then, Büscher passed to Neagle, who was unmarked inside the 18-yard box. A 3–0 victory was in the books after Neagle collected a long outlet pass by Hamid and then set up Saborio in front of the goal in the 90th minute. The Costa Rican had not played in over a month but showed no sign of rust as he neatly beat the Crew goalie. It was the first time in 2016 that D.C. had won two games in a row, and it stretched the team's home unbeaten streak to 8 games. The win solidified United's hold on 6th place and a playoff spot, stretching the lead over New England to four points, but United also trailed Montreal by only a point and Philadelphia by only two points, with three games remaining in the regular season.

=== October ===
For D.C. United, the final month of MLS' regular season began the way the prior month ended—with a victory, one that extended the winning streak to three games in a row. Following the midweek win over the Crew, United traveled to Toronto, where they faced a Toronto F.C. squad that had struggled since their star Giovinco was injured. Jozy Altidore, however, continued his hot streak. as he dribbled past both Birnbaum and Hamid and scored to stake the home team to a lead in the 36th minute. But, Neagle scored on a header three minutes later to level the score, when a goalmouth scramble forced a saved by the Toronto goalie that found its way to Neagle in front of the goal. Neagle made it two in the second half when he got on the end of a Sam pass and touched it beyond the keeper's reach. Pending the next day's Montreal Impact match, the win catapulted D.C. at least temporarily into 4th place in the Eastern Conference. The Toronto match was followed by a break for international games, and both Birnbaum and Hamid were called into the national team. Birnbaum made the trip to Cuba where he was a second-half substitute, but a kick to the face left him bloody and needing stitches.

Despite the incident in Havana, Birnbaum was in the starting lineup when NYCFC came to RFK in the final home game of the regular season for DC. Playing before an announced crowd of over 30,000, United played as strong a half as the team had at any time under Coach Ben Olsen. Patrick Mullins put DC out in front as he finished a Lloyd Sam cross in the 27th minute. Four minutes later, Boswell headed in a Sam corner kick to give the home team a much deserved 2–0 lead. Just before halftime, a defensive error allowed United to extend the lead to 3–0. An errant back pass found its way to Mullins, who then found Rob Vincent at the top of the box, leaving Vincent with a wide-open goal to shoot at for his second MLS goal. NYCFC got one back after the 70' mark, when David Villa drew a soft penalty call, and then beat Hamid on the penalty kick. The 3–1 win clinched a postseason spot for United and left them a point ahead of Montreal in the race for 4th place and a home-field advantage in the play-in game.

D.C. closed out the regular season in Orlando knowing that they would be hosting the play-in round match four days later so long as the Montreal Impact did not win at New England, so it probably should not have surprised anyone that Coach Olsen started a line-up made of entirely of reserves and a few players returning from lengthy injury spells. Not surprisingly, Orlando City dominated the match, winning 4–2, despite United goals by Saborio and Igboananike, who notched his first goal for United, with Büscher assisting on both goals. Montreal fell to defeat to the Revolution, however, so D.C. would host the Impact in the mid-week play-in match.

United's season came to a crashing end in the playoff match against Montreal Impact. In the 3rd minute, captain Bobby Boswell made a huge mental mistake, ignoring his goalie's pleas to allow a missed shot to bounce over the end line and under no pressure, Boswell played it out for a corner. Montreal converted on the set piece as Laurent Ciman ran onto the cross and volleyed to give the visitors the early lead. United was frustrated by the Impact defense, and finally surrendered a second goal late in the first half after a failed clearance gave the Impact a chance to run at the D.C. defense. Ignacio Piatti chipped the ball behind the back line and Matteo Mancosu ran on to the pass and slotted it in for a 2–0 lead. The lead grew to 3-0 when a Mancosu header beat Hamid. United began showing some life late, but two Birnbaum headers were cleared off the line. The result was put beyond any doubt when Mancosu and Piatti combined on a breakaway, with Piatti getting the goal. D.C. did manage to make the scoreline more respectable in the closing moments, as Neagle headed in a Nyarko cross for a goal in the 90th minute and Kemp scored unassisted in stoppage time with a screamer inside the post from 25 yards. Though the team showed the same late-game fire they had for the last 3 months, they had dug too deep a hole, and a 4–2 loss began the long off-season.

== Squad ==
=== Roster ===
As of September 9, 2016

Squad No.	Name	Nationality	Position(s)	Previous club	Date of birth (age)
Goalkeepers
28	Bill Hamid formerly HGP	(United States)	GK	(United States) D.C. United Academy	November 25, 1990 (age 35)
30	Charlie Horton	(United States)	GK	(England) Leeds United	September 14, 1994 (age 31)
48	Travis Worra	(United States)	GK	(United States) New Hampshire Wildcats	April 19, 1993 (age 33)
50	Andrew Dykstra	(United States)	GK	(United States) Charleston Battery	January 2, 1986 (age 40)
Defenders
2	Taylor Kemp	(United States)	LB / WB	(United States) Maryland Terrapins	July 23, 1990 (age 35)
5	Sean Franklin	(United States)	RB / WB	(United States) LA Galaxy	March 21, 1985 (age 41)
6	Kofi Opare	(Ghana)	CB	(United States) LA Galaxy	October 12, 1990 (age 35)
15	Steve Birnbaum formerly GA	(United States)	CB / RB	(United States) California Golden Bears	January 23, 1991 (age 35)
20	Jalen Robinson HGP	(United States)	CB / DM	(United States) Wake Forest Demon Deacons	May 8, 1994 (age 31)
22	Chris Korb	(United States)	RB / WB	(United States) Akron Zips	October 8, 1987 (age 38)
32	Bobby Boswell (C)	(United States)	CB	(United States) Houston Dynamo	March 15, 1983 (age 43)
34	Luke Mishu	(United States)	RB / CB	(United States) Notre Dame Fighting Irish	June 26, 1991 (age 34)
Midfielders
7	Marcelo Sarvas	(Brazil)	CM / AM	(United States) Colorado Rapids	October 16, 1981 (age 44)
8	Lloyd Sam	(Ghana)	LW / RW	(United States) New York Red Bulls	September 27, 1984 (age 41)
11	Luciano Acosta	(Argentina)	AM / FW	(Argentina) Boca Juniors	May 31, 1994 (age 31)
12	Patrick Nyarko	(Ghana)	RW	(United States) Chicago Fire	January 15, 1986 (age 40)
13	Lamar Neagle	(United States)	LW / FW	(United States) Seattle Sounders FC	May 7, 1987 (age 38)
14	Nick DeLeon formerly GA	(United States)	CM / LM	(United States) Louisville Cardinals	July 17, 1990 (age 35)
21	Chris Durkin HGP	(United States)	DM	(United States) Richmond Kickers	February 8, 2000 (age 26)
25	Jared Jeffrey	(United States)	CM / AM	(Germany) Mainz 05	July 14, 1990 (age 35)
26	Rob Vincent	(England)	CM	(United States) Pittsburgh Riverhounds	October 26, 1990 (age 35)
27	Collin Martin HGP	(United States)	CM	(United States) Wake Forest Demon Deacons	November 9, 1994 (age 31)
33	Julian Büscher GA	(Germany)	CM / AM	(United States) Syracuse Orange	April 22, 1993 (age 33)
Forwards
9	Álvaro Saborío	(Costa Rica)	FW	(United States) Real Salt Lake	March 25, 1982 (age 44)
16	Patrick Mullins	(United States)	FW	(United States) New York City FC	February 5, 1992 (age 34)
17	Miguel Aguilar	(Mexico)	FW / RW	(United States) San Francisco Dons	August 30, 1993 (age 32)
18	Chris Rolfe (VC)	(United States)	FW / LW	(United States) Chicago Fire	January 17, 1983 (age 43)
45	Alhaji Kamara	(Sierra Leone)	FW	(Sweden) Norrköping	April 16, 1994 (age 32)
77	Kennedy Igboananike	(Nigeria)	FW	(United States) Chicago Fire	February 26, 1989 (age 37)

- HGP = Home grown player
- GA = Generation Adidas player
- DP = Designated Player

== Competitions ==
=== Preseason friendlies ===
January 29	Elfsborg	1–0	D.C. United	Bradenton
19:00 EDT	Claesson 4'	Report		Stadium: IMG Academy

February 2	J-Södra	2–2	D.C. United	Bradenton
15:00 EDT	Cibicki 48'; Siwe 58'		Espíndola 4' (pen.); Aguilar 61'	Stadium: IMG Academy

February 5	Brann	Cancelled	D.C. United	Bradenton
10:00 EDT				Stadium: IMG Academy

=== Suncoast Invitational ===
February 13	Tampa Bay Rowdies	0–1	D.C. United	St. Petersburg
19:00 EDT	King (yellow card) 32'; Burgos (yellow card) 41'	Report	Espíndola 27'; Clowes (yellow card) 30'; Birnbaum (yellow card) 43'	Stadium: Al Lang Stadium; Referee: Silviu Petrescu

February 17	D.C. United	1–1	Philadelphia Union	St. Petersburg
16:00 EDT	Espíndola 54' (pen.)	Report	Le Toux 6'	Stadium: Al Lang Stadium

February 20	D.C. United	1–4	Montreal Impact	St. Petersburg
16:00 EDT	Saborío 36'	Report	Oduro 5', 31'; Salazar 18'; Williams 86'	Stadium: Al Lang Stadium

=== Major League Soccer ===
==== League tables ====
===== Eastern Conference =====
Pos	Team	Pld	W	L	T	GF	GA	GD	Pts	Qualification
2	New York City FC	34	15	10	9	62	57	+5	54	MLS Cup Conference Semifinals
3	Toronto FC	34	14	9	11	51	39	+12	53	MLS Cup Knockout Round
4	D.C. United	34	11	10	13	53	47	+6	46	MLS Cup Knockout Round
5	Montreal Impact	34	11	11	12	49	53	−4	45	MLS Cup Knockout Round
6	Philadelphia Union	34	11	14	9	52	55	−3	42	MLS Cup Knockout Round

Source: MLS

===== Overall =====
Pos	Team	Pld	W	L	T	GF	GA	GD	Pts
8	Sporting Kansas City	34	13	13	8	42	41	+1	47
9	Real Salt Lake	34	12	12	10	44	46	−2	46
10	D.C. United	34	11	10	13	53	47	+6	46
11	Montreal Impact	34	11	11	12	49	53	−4	45
12	Portland Timbers	34	12	14	8	48	53	−5	44

Source: MLS
Rules for classification: 1) points; 2) total wins; 3) total goal differential; 4) total goals scored;

==== Results ====
March 6 1	LA Galaxy	4–1	D.C. United	Carson
22:00 EDT	Steres 54'; Magee 64', 87'; Keane 83' (pen.)	Report	Neagle 5' (yellow card) 48'; Franklin (yellow card) 59'; DeLeon (yellow card) 86'	Stadium: StubHub Center; Attendance: 25,667

March 12 2	New England Revolution	0–0	D.C. United	Foxborough
22:00 EDT	Koffie (yellow card) 26'	Report	Acosta (yellow card) 45+1'; Franklin (yellow card) 56'; DeLeon (yellow card) 64'; Sarvas (yellow card) 87'	Stadium: Gillette Stadium; Attendance: 16,102; Referee: Silviu Petrescu

March 20 3	D.C. United	1–1	Colorado Rapids	Washington, D.C.
17:00 EDT	Espindola 80'; Sarvas (yellow card) 86'	Report	Watts (yellow card) 19'; Powers (yellow card) 45+1' (goal) 69'; Sjöberg (yellow card) 49'; Azira (yellow card) 73'	Stadium: RFK Stadium; Attendance: 15,334; Referee: Chris Penso

March 26 4	D.C. United	0–3	FC Dallas	Washington, D.C.
17:30 EDT	Sarvas (yellow card) 37' (red card) 66'; Rolfe (yellow card) 61'	Report	Barrios 14', 28' (yellow card) 60'; Gruezo (yellow card) 30'; Urruti 52'	Stadium: RFK Stadium; Attendance: 14,201; Referee: Jose Carlos Rivero

April 2 5	San Jose Earthquakes	1–1	D.C. United	San Jose
22:30 EDT	Francis (yellow card) 31'; Imperiale (yellow card) 55'; Jahn 88'	Report	Nyarko 34' (yellow card) 64'; Kemp (yellow card) 59'; Acosta (yellow card) 86'	Stadium: Avaya Stadium; Attendance: 18,000; Referee: Fotis Bazakos

April 9 6	D.C. United	4–0	Vancouver Whitecaps FC	Washington, D.C.
17:30 EDT	Espindola 39', 54'; Franklin (yellow card) 70'; Saborio 88', 90+1'	Report	Froese (yellow card) 65'	Stadium: RFK Stadium; Attendance: 14,088; Referee: Jorge Gonzalez

April 16 7	D.C. United	0–1	Toronto FC	Washington, D.C.
19:00 EDT	Sarvas (yellow card) 89'; Birnbaum (yellow card) 90+5'	Report	Giovinco 1'; Altidore (yellow card) 35'; Irwin (yellow card) 88'	Stadium: RFK Stadium; Attendance: 16,236; Referee: Mathieu Bourdeau

April 23 8	D.C. United	3–0	New England Revolution	Washington, D.C.
17:00 EDT	Sarvas (yellow card) 21'; Neagle 33' (pen.); Franklin (yellow card) 62'; Acosta 86'; Saborío 90'	Report	Caldwell (yellow card) 45+1'; Gonçalves (yellow card) 68'	Stadium: RFK Stadium; Attendance: 16,005; Referee: Alan Kelly

April 30 9	Chicago Fire	1–1	D.C. United	Bridgeview
17:00 EDT	Campbell 41'; Igboananike (yellow card) 44'	Report	Rolfe (yellow card) 45+1'; Nyarko 64'; Birnbaum (yellow card) 83'	Stadium: Toyota Park; Attendance: 13,114; Referee: Edvin Jurisevic

May 8 10	D.C. United	0–2	New York City FC	Washington, D.C.
19:30 EDT	Acosta (yellow card) 3'; Jeffrey (yellow card) 47'; Büscher (yellow card) 90+4'	Report	Villa 49'; Shelton 53'; Brillant (yellow card) 59'; Saunders (yellow card) 78'; Bravo (yellow card) 79'	Stadium: RFK Stadium; Attendance: 14,504; Referee: Allen Chapman

May 13 11	D.C. United	2–0	New York Red Bulls	Washington, D.C.
19:00 EDT	Sarvas (yellow card) 8'; Saborío 20'; Nyarko 43'; Birnbaum (yellow card) 45+1'; DeLeon (yellow card) 83'	Report	Grella (yellow card) 11'; Duvall (yellow card) 41'	Stadium: RFK Stadium; Attendance: 19,632; Referee: Silviu Petrescu

May 20 12	Philadelphia Union	1–0	D.C. United	Chester
19:00 EDT	Barnetta (yellow card) 80'; Gaddis (yellow card) 82'; Marquez 90+1' (yellow card) 90+2'	Report	Nyarko (yellow card) 45+1'; Birnbaum (yellow card) 53'	Stadium: Talen Energy Stadium; Attendance: 17,364; Referee: Jaime Herrera

May 27 13	Sporting Kansas City	0–1	D.C. United	Kansas City
00:00 EDT	Dwyer (yellow card) 71'; Nagamura (yellow card) 78'	Report	Sarvas (yellow card) 7'; Jeffrey (yellow card) 42'; Neagle (yellow card) 68'; Kamara 86'	Stadium: Children's Mercy Park; Attendance: 19,118; Referee: Alan Kelly

June 1 14	D.C. United	0–2	Seattle Sounders FC	Washington, D.C.
19:00 EDT	Espíndola (yellow card) 73'	Report	Ivanschitz (yellow card) 38'; Kovar (yellow card) 64'; Morris 79'; Jones 83'	Stadium: RFK Stadium; Attendance: 15,174; Referee: Jose Carlos Rivero

June 18 15	Houston Dynamo	0–0	D.C. United	Houston
20:00 EDT	Rodríguez (yellow card) 42'	Report	DeLeon (yellow card) 9'; Boswell (yellow card) 28'; Jeffrey (yellow card) 87'	Stadium: BBVA Compass Stadium; Attendance: 19,774; Referee: Allen Chapman

June 25 16	D.C. United	2–0	New England Revolution	Washington, D.C.
19:00 EDT	Neagle 20'; Opare (yellow card) 22'; Franklin 27'; Espíndola (yellow card) 57'; Acosta (yellow card) 67'	Report		Stadium: RFK Stadium; Attendance: 16,051; Referee: Marcos de Oliveira

July 1 17	Real Salt Lake	1–1	D.C. United	Sandy
22:30 EDT	Beltran (yellow card) 19'; Beckerman (yellow card) 42'; Martínez 52'	Report	Kemp (yellow card) 3'; Boswell (yellow card) 81'; Jeffrey 90+2'	Stadium: Rio Tinto Stadium; Attendance: 20,389; Referee: Juan Guzman

July 9 18	Philadelphia Union	3–0	D.C. United	Chester
19:00 EDT	Alberg 20' (pen.); Ilsinho 37' (pen.), 47'	Report	Opare (yellow card) 19' (yellow card) 65' (red card)	Stadium: Talen Energy Stadium; Attendance: 18,463; Referee: Sorin Stoica

July 16 19	Columbus Crew	1–1	D.C. United	Columbus
19:30 EDT	Kamara 63'; Trapp (yellow card) 21'; Afful (red card) 74'; Clark (yellow card) 88'		Fabian Espindola 89'	Stadium: Mapfre Stadium; Attendance: 20,065; Referee: Silvio Petrescu

July 23 20	Toronto FC	4–1	D.C. United	Toronto
19:30 EDT	Chapman (yellow card) 17'; Giovinco 21', 39', 90+1'; Delgado 29' (yellow card) 60'; Moor (yellow card) 54'	Report	Jeffrey 24' (yellow card) 38'; Sarvas (yellow card) 28'	Stadium: BMO Field; Attendance: 26,349; Referee: Armando Villarreal

July 31 21	D.C. United	1–1	Montreal Impact	Washington, D.C.
18:30 EDT	Mullins 20' (yellow card) 77'; Sarvas (yellow card) 25'	Report	Bekker (yellow card) 54'; Drogba (red card) 81'; Bernardello 86' (yellow card) 90+2'	Stadium: RFK Stadium; Attendance: 16,728; Referee: Ted Unkel

August 6 22	D.C. United	2–2	Philadelphia Union	Washington, D.C.
19:00 EDT	Kemp 16'; Acosta (yellow card) 58'; Birnbaum 90+4'	Report	Marquez (yellow card) 5'; Barnetta 45+1'; Pontius 57'; Tribbett (yellow card) 63'	Stadium: RFK Stadium; Attendance: 16,392; Referee: Jair Marrufo

August 13 23	D.C. United	2–0	Portland Timbers	Washington, D.C.
19:00 EDT	Birnbaum 7'; Acosta 29'; Boswell (yellow card) 56'; Franklin (yellow card) 75'	Report	Ridgewell (yellow card) 50'; Jewsbury (yellow card) 57'; Andriuskevicius (yellow card) 83'	Stadium: RFK Stadium; Attendance: 16,298; Referee: Jorge González

August 21 24	D.C. United	2–2	New York Red Bulls	Washington, D.C.
15:00 EDT	Acosta (yellow card) 36'; Marcelo (yellow card) 52' (goal) 70' (pen.); Mullins 73'	Report	B. Wright-Phillips 38'; Felipe 64'	Stadium: RFK Stadium; Attendance: 15,139; Referee: Ismail Elfath

August 24 25	Montreal Impact	1–1	D.C. United	Montreal
19:00 EDT	Bush (yellow card) 36'; Camara 77'	Report	Birnbaum (yellow card) 8'; Neagle 39' (pen.); Sarvas (yellow card) 63'; Igboananike (yellow card) 67'; Opare (red card) 89'	Stadium: Stade Saputo; Attendance: 19,740; Referee: Robert Sibiga

August 27 26	D.C. United	6–1	Chicago Fire	Washington, D.C.
19:30 EDT	Jeffrey (yellow card) 19'; Acosta 25'; Mullins 40', 45+1', 74'; Nyarko 51'; DeLeon 89'	Report	de Leeuw 31'; Thiam (red card) 34'; Cociș (yellow card) 45+2'	Stadium: RFK Stadium; Attendance: 15,720; Referee: Drew Fischer

September 1 27	New York City FC	3–2	D.C. United	New York City
19:00 EDT	Villa 79'; Lampard 85', 90+3'	Report	Acosta (yellow card) 33'; Sam 36'; Vincent (yellow card) 58'; Neagle 90+1'	Stadium: Yankee Stadium; Attendance: 23,768; Referee: Chris Penso

September 11 28	New York Red Bulls	2–2	D.C. United	Harrison
13:00 EDT	Verón 35'; B. Wright-Phillips 54'	Report	Vincent (yellow card) 24'; Sam (yellow card) 34'; Büscher (yellow card) 68'; Birnbaum 89'; Neagle 90+5'	Stadium: Red Bull Arena; Attendance: 20,086; Referee: Jair Marrufo

September 16 29	Chicago Fire	2–2	D.C. United	Bridgeview
20:00 EDT	Cociș 22'; Accam 29'	Report	Vincent 19'; Boswell 90+2'	Stadium: Toyota Park; Attendance: 13,807

September 24 30	D.C. United	4–1	Orlando City SC	Washington, D.C.
19:00 EDT	Acosta (yellow card) 25'; Mullins 34', 53'; Sam 51'; Büscher (yellow card) 59' (goal) 90'; Vincent (yellow card) 72'	Report	Nocerino (red card) 66'; Alston (yellow card) 67'; Baptista 72'	Stadium: RFK Stadium; Attendance: 25,842; Referee: Sorin Stoica

September 28 31	D.C. United	3–0	Columbus Crew	Washington, D.C.
19:00 EDT	Sam 71'; Neagle 86'; Saborío 90'			Stadium: RFK Stadium; Attendance: 12,094

October 1 32	Toronto FC	1–2	D.C. United	Toronto
19:30 EDT	Altidore 36'	Report	Vincent (yellow card) 22'; Neagle 39', 58'; Acosta (yellow card) 83'	Stadium: BMO Field; Attendance: 22,212; Referee: Mark Geiger

October 16 33	D.C. United	3–1	New York City FC	Washington, D.C.
15:00 EDT	Mullins 27'; Boswell 31'; Vincent 45'; DeLeon (yellow card) 75'	Report	Pirlo (yellow card) 53'; Villa 72' (pen.)	Stadium: RFK Stadium; Attendance: 30,943; Referee: Alan Kelly

October 23 34	Orlando City SC	4–2	D.C. United	Orlando
16:00 EDT	Molino 13'; Kaká 21'; Higuita 50'; Baptista 89'	Report	Saborío 43'; Igboananike 78'	Stadium: Camping World Stadium; Attendance: 30,022; Referee: Juan Guzman

=== MLS Cup Playoffs ===
==== Knockout round ====
October 27 Knockout Round	D.C. United	2–4	Montreal Impact	Washington, D.C.
19:30 EDT	Neagle 90'; Kemp 90+4'	Report	Ciman 4'; Mancosu 43', 58'; Piatti 83'	Stadium: RFK Stadium; Attendance: 12,773; Referee: Jair Marrufo

=== U.S. Open Cup ===
June 15 Fourth round	D.C. United	0–0 (a.e.t.) (3–4 p)	Fort Lauderdale Strikers	Boyds
19:00 EDT	Kamara (yellow card) 47'; Durkin (yellow card) 63'	Report		Stadium: Maryland SoccerPlex; Referee: Matthew Kreitzer
	Penalties
	Büscher (penalty scored); Vincent (penalty scored); Kemp (penalty scored); Acosta (penalty missed); Jeffrey (penalty missed)		(penalty scored) Paligari; (penalty missed) Santos; (penalty scored) Gabriel; (penalty scored) Núñez; (penalty scored) Carvalho

=== CONCACAF Champions League ===
==== 2015–16 ====
D.C. United advanced to the quarterfinals after dominating their Group with three wins and one draw. Lamar Neagle was ruled ineligible to play, as he had previously played in the group stage with the Seattle Sounders before being traded to D.C., and could not represent two different teams in the same competition. Miguel Aguilar was suspended from the first match due to yellow card accumulation in the group stage.

===== Quarterfinals =====
February 23 First leg	Querétaro (Mexico)	2–0	D.C. United	Querétaro City
20:00 EDT	Candelo 71'; Benítez 83'	Report	Sarvas (yellow card) 73'	Stadium: Estadio Corregidora; Referee: Ramón Hernández

March 1 Second leg	D.C. United	1–1 (1–3 agg.)	(Mexico) Querétaro	Washington, D.C.
20:00 EDT	Sarvas (yellow card) 12'; Boswell (yellow card) 72'; Büscher 84'	Report	Sepúlveda 4'; Martínez (yellow card) 18'	Stadium: RFK Stadium; Attendance: 10,790; Referee: John Pitti

== Transfers ==
=== In ===
No.	Pos.	Player	Transferred from	Fee/notes	Date	Source
13	MF	(United States) Lamar Neagle	(United States) Seattle Sounders FC	Trade	December 7, 2015	
12	FW	(Ghana) Patrick Nyarko	(United States) Chicago Fire	Traded for SuperDraft pick	January 6, 2016	
33	MF	(Germany) Julian Büscher	(United States) Syracuse Orange	2016 MLS SuperDraft 1st round pick	January 14, 2016	
16	MF	(England) Paul Clowes	(United States) Clemson Tigers	2016 MLS SuperDraft 2nd round pick	January 14, 2016	
	DF	(Isle of Man) Liam Doyle	(United States) Ohio State Buckeyes	2016 MLS SuperDraft 4th round pick	January 19, 2016	
7	MF	(Brazil) Marcelo Sarvas	(United States) Colorado Rapids	Approximately $180,000	February 1, 2016	
11	MF	(Argentina) Luciano Acosta	(Argentina) Boca Juniors	On loan, with buyout option	February 15, 2016	
26	MF	(England) Rob Vincent	(United States) Pittsburgh Riverhounds	Undisclosed Fee	February 17, 2016	
30	GK	(United States) Charlie Horton	(England) Leeds United	Free Transfer	February 29, 2016	
41	MF	(Italy) Andrea Mancini	(Hungary) Szombathelyi Haladás	Free Transfer	March 27, 2016	
1	GK	(United States) Tally Hall	(United States) Orlando City SC	Free Transfer	April 1, 2016	
45	FW	(Sierra Leone) Alhaji Kamara	(Sweden) Norrköping	Free Transfer	May 10, 2016	
21	MF	(United States) Chris Durkin	(United States) Richmond Kickers	Signed as a Homegrown Player	June 14, 2016	
8	MF	(Ghana) Lloyd Sam	(United States) New York Red Bulls	Acquired in exchange for General Allocation Money	July 7, 2016	
16	FW	(United States) Patrick Mullins	(United States) New York City F.C.	Acquired in exchange for General Allocation Money and international roster slot	July 20, 2016	
77	FW	(Nigeria) Kennedy Igboananike	(United States) Chicago Fire	Acquired in exchange for Targeted Allocation Money and a 3rd round pick in the 2019 MLS SuperDraft	July 29, 2016	

=== Out ===
No.	Pos.	Player	Transferred to	Fee/notes	Date	Source
7	FW	(United States) Eddie Johnson	None	Retired	November 1, 2015	
19	FW	(Costa Rica) Jairo Arrieta	(United States) New York Cosmos	Option Declined	December 7, 2015	
12	MF	(United States) Michael Farfan	(United States) Seattle Sounders FC	Option Declined	December 7, 2015	
21	MF	(Argentina) Facundo Coria	(Argentina) Quilmes	Waived	December 7, 2015	
13	FW	(United States) Chris Pontius	(United States) Philadelphia Union	Trade	December 6, 2015	
23	MF	(United States) Perry Kitchen	(Scotland) Heart of Midlothian	Contract expired, refused new contract	December 23, 2015	
	DF	(Isle of Man) Liam Doyle	(United States) Harrisburg City Islanders	Released	February 5, 2016	
30	FW	(United States) Conor Doyle	(United States) Colorado Rapids	Trade for 3rd round pick in 2017 MLS SuperDraft	February 9, 2016	
8	MF	(United States) Davy Arnaud	None	Retired, staying as coach.	March 3, 2016	
16	MF	(England) Paul Clowes	(United States) Charlotte Independence	Waived	May 10, 2016	
4	MF	(Finland) Markus Halsti	(Denmark) Midtjylland	Mutually Terminated Contract	May 25, 2016	
10	FW	(Argentina) Fabian Espindola	(Canada) Vancouver Whitecaps FC	Trade in exchange for General Allocation Money	July 20, 2016	
1	GK	(United States) Tally Hall	None	Retired	July 29, 2016	
41	MF	(Italy) Andrea Mancini	(United States) New York Cosmos	Released	September 9, 2016	

=== Loan out ===
No.	Pos.	Player	Loaned to	Start	End	Source
27	MF	(United States) Collin Martin	(United States) Richmond Kickers	March 23, 2016		
20	DF	(United States) Jalen Robinson	(United States) Richmond Kickers	March 23, 2016		
16	MF	(England) Paul Clowes	(United States) Richmond Kickers	March 23, 2016	May 10, 2016	
30	GK	(United States) Charlie Horton	(United States) Richmond Kickers	May 17, 2016		
26	MF	(England) Rob Vincent	(United States) Pittsburgh Riverhounds	May 25, 2016	June 11, 2016	

=== Draft picks ===
2016 D.C. United Draft
Round	Selection	Player	Position	College
1	11	Julian Buescher	Midfielder	Syracuse
2	32	Paul Clowes	Midfielder	Clemson
4	67	Liam Doyle	Defender	Ohio State
4	74	PASS		
4	79	PASS		

== Statistics ==
As of match played July 1, 2016

=== Appearances and goals ===
No.	Pos	Nat	Player	Total		MLS		MLS Cup Playoffs		U.S. Open Cup		CONCACAF Champions League	
No.	Pos	Nat	Player	Apps	Goals	Apps	Goals	Apps	Goals	Apps	Goals	Apps	Goals
2	DF	(United States) USA	Taylor Kemp	36	2	31+1	1	1+0	1	0+1	0	2+0	0
5	DF	(United States) USA	Sean Franklin	32	1	29+0	1	0+0	0	1+0	0	2+0	0
6	DF	(Ghana) GHA	Kofi Opare	11	0	10+0	0	0+0	0	1+0	0	0+0	0
7	MF	(Brazil) BRA	Marcelo Sarvas	31	1	26+2	1	0+1	0	0+0	0	2+0	0
8	MF	(England) ENG	Lloyd Sam	14	3	13+0	3	1+0	0	0+0	0	0+0	0
9	FW	(Costa Rica) CRC	Álvaro Saborío	20	6	8+11	6	0+0	0	0+0	0	0+1	0
11	MF	(Argentina) ARG	Luciano Acosta	35	3	25+6	3	1+0	0	0+1	0	1+1	0
12	MF	(Ghana) GHA	Patrick Nyarko	29	4	23+3	4	1+0	0	0+0	0	2+0	0
13	MF	(United States) USA	Lamar Neagle	32	10	21+10	9	0+1	1	0+0	0	0+0	0
14	MF	(United States) USA	Nick DeLeon	35	1	27+5	1	1+0	0	0+0	0	2+0	0
15	DF	(United States) USA	Steve Birnbaum	29	3	26+0	3	1+0	0	0+0	0	2+0	0
16	FW	(United States) USA	Patrick Mullins	15	8	12+2	8	1+0	0	0+0	0	0+0	0
17	FW	(Mexico) MEX	Miguel Aguilar	7	0	0+6	0	0+0	0	1+0	0	0+0	0
18	FW	(United States) USA	Chris Rolfe	11	0	9+0	0	0+0	0	0+0	0	2+0	0
20	DF	(United States) USA	Jalen Robinson	5	0	3+1	0	0+0	0	1+0	0	0+0	0
21	MF	(United States) USA	Chris Durkin	1	0	0+0	0	0+0	0	1+0	0	0+0	0
22	DF	(United States) USA	Chris Korb	0	0	0+0	0	0+0	0	0+0	0	0+0	0
25	MF	(United States) USA	Jared Jeffrey	23	2	14+7	2	1+0	0	1+0	0	0+0	0
26	MF	(England) ENG	Rob Vincent	24	2	12+8	2	1+0	0	1+0	0	1+1	0
27	MF	(United States) USA	Collin Martin	2	0	1+1	0	0+0	0	0+0	0	0+0	0
28	GK	(United States) USA	Bill Hamid	21	0	20+0	0	1+0	0	0+0	0	0+0	0
30	GK	(United States) USA	Charlie Horton	0	0	0+0	0	0+0	0	0+0	0	0+0	0
32	DF	(United States) USA	Bobby Boswell	33	2	29+1	2	1+0	0	0+0	0	2+0	0
33	MF	(Germany) GER	Julian Büscher	24	2	3+17	1	0+1	0	1+0	0	0+2	1
34	DF	(United States) USA	Luke Mishu	8	0	5+2	0	0+0	0	1+0	0	0+0	0
45	FW	(Sierra Leone) SLE	Alhaji Kamara	7	1	1+5	1	0+0	0	1+0	0	0+0	0
48	GK	(United States) USA	Travis Worra	14	0	13+0	0	0+0	0	1+0	0	0+0	0
50	GK	(United States) USA	Andrew Dykstra	3	0	1+0	0	0+0	0	0+0	0	2+0	0
77	FW	(Nigeria) NGA	Kennedy Igboananike	7	1	2+5	1	0+0	0	0+0	0	0+0	0
Players who left the club during the 2016 season
1	GK	(United States) USA	Tally Hall	0	0	0+0	0	0+0	0	0+0	0	0+0	0
4	MF	(Finland) FIN	Markus Halsti	1	0	0+0	0	0+0	0	0+0	0	0+1	0
10	FW	(Argentina) ARG	Fabián Espíndola	15	3	9+4	3	0+0	0	0+0	0	2+0	0
16	MF	(England) ENG	Paul Clowes	0	0	0+0	0	0+0	0	0+0	0	0+0	0
41	MF	(Italy) ITA	Andrea Mancini	1	0	0+0	0	0+0	0	0+1	0	0+0	0

=== Goals and assists ===
No.	Pos.	Name	MLS		MLS Cup		U.S. Open Cup		CONCACAF Champions League		Total	
No.	Pos.	Name	Goals	Assists	Goals	Assists	Goals	Assists	Goals	Assists	Goals	Assists
13	M/F	Lamar Neagle	9	6	1	0	0	0	0	0	10	6
16	FW	Patrick Mullins	8	2	0	0	0	0	0	0	8	2
9	FW	Álvaro Saborío	6	3	0	0	0	0	0	0	6	3
12	MF	Patrick Nyarko	4	8	0	1	0	0	0	0	4	9
10	FW	Fabian Espindola	4	1	0	0	0	0	0	1	4	2
11	M/F	Luciano Acosta	3	11	0	0	0	0	0	0	3	11
8	MF	Lloyd Sam	3	6	0	0	0	0	0	0	3	6
15	D	Steve Birnbaum	3	2	0	0	0	0	0	0	3	2
2	DF	Taylor Kemp	1	6	1	0	0	0	0	0	2	6
33	MF	Julian Büscher	1	4	0	0	0	0	1	0	2	4
32	D	Bobby Boswell	2	1	0	0	0	0	0	0	2	1
26	MF	Rob Vincent	2	0	0	0	0	0	0	0	2	0
25	MF	Jared Jeffrey	2	0	0	0	0	0	0	0	2	0
5	DF	Sean Franklin	1	2	0	0	0	0	0	0	1	2
7	MF	Marcelo Sarvas	1	2	0	0	0	0	0	0	1	2
45	FW	Alhaji Kamara	1	0	0	0	0	0	0	0	1	0
14	MF-D	Nick DeLeon	1	0	0	0	0	0	0	0	1	0
77	FW	Kennedy Igboananike	1	0	0	0	0	0	0	0	1	0
18	F	Chris Rolfe	0	1	0	0	0	0	0	0	0	1

=== Disciplinary record ===
No.	Pos.	Name	MLS		MLS Cup		U.S. Open Cup		CONCACAF Champions League		Total	
No.	Pos.	Name	Booked	Sent off (straight red)	Booked	Sent off (straight red)	Booked	Sent off (straight red)	Booked	Sent off (straight red)	Booked	Sent off (straight red)
7	MF	Marcelo Sarvas	11	1	0	0	0	0	2	0	11	1
11	M/F	Luciano Acosta	9	0	0	0	0	0	0	0	9	0
25	MF	Jared Jeffrey	5	0	0	0	0	0	0	0	5	0
15	DF	Steve Birnbaum	5	0	0	0	0	0	0	0	5	0
5	DF	Sean Franklin	5	0	0	0	0	0	0	0	5	0
14	MF	Nick DeLeon	5	0	0	0	0	0	0	0	5	0
26	MF	Rob Vincent	4	0	0	0	0	0	0	0	4	0
32	DF	Bobby Boswell	3	0	0	0	0	0	1	0	4	0
10	FW	Fabian Espindola	3	0	0	0	0	0	0	0	3	0
33	MF	Julian Büscher	3	0	0	0	0	0	0	0	3	0
12	MF	Patrick Nyarko	2	0	0	0	0	0	0	0	2	0
13	M/F	Lamar Neagle	2	0	0	0	0	0	0	0	2	0
18	FW	Chris Rolfe	2	0	0	0	0	0	0	0	2	0
2	DF	Taylor Kemp	2	0	0	0	0	0	0	0	2	0
6	DF	Kofi Opare	2	2	0	0	0	0	0	0	2	2
8	MF	Lloyd Sam	1	0	0	0	0	0	0	0	1	0
77	F	Kennedy Igboananike	1	0	0	0	0	0	0	0	1	0
21	MF	Chris Durkin	0	0	0	0	1	0	0	0	1	0
45	FW	Alhaji Kamara	0	0	0	0	1	0	0	0	1	0

== See also ==
- 2016 Major League Soccer season
- 2016 in American soccer
- 2016 Richmond Kickers season
