= Birnbaum =

Birnbaum may refer to:

== Places ==
=== Austria ===
- Birnbaum (Lesachtal), a village in Lesachtal, Carinthia, Austria

=== Germany ===
- Birnbaum (Frankenwald), an unincorporated area in Kronach, Bavaria
- Birnbaum (Gummersbach), a district of Gummersbach, North Rhine-Westphalia

=== Poland ===
- Birnbaum an der Warthe, now Międzychód, Greater Poland Voivodeship
- Kreis Birnbaum, an administrative district of the Grand Duchy of Posen and, later, the Prussian province of Posen

=== Slovenia ===
- Hrušica (plateau) (German: Birnbaumer Wald)
- Hrušica (settlement) (German: Birnbaum), village in the municipality of Jesenice

== Other uses ==
- Birnbaum (painting), by Gustav Klimt
- Birnbaum (surname)

== See also ==
- Barenboim (surname)
- Bernbaum
- Berenbaum
