= Birnbaum (surname) =

Birnbaum (German: "pear tree") is a German-language family name common among Ashkenazi Jews. Notable people with the surname include:

- Adam Birnbaum (born 1979), American jazz pianist, composer, and arranger
- Alfred Birnbaum (born 1955), American translator
- Alan Birnbaum, founder of the Temple of the True Inner Light, a psychedelic church
- Allan Birnbaum (1923–1976), American statistician
- Amy Birnbaum (born 1975), American voice actress
- Arved Birnbaum (1962–2021), German actor and director
- Brigitte Birnbaum (1938–2024), German author
- Clemens Birnbaum (born 1963), German musicologist and cultural manager
- Daniel Birnbaum (born 1963), curator
- Dara Birnbaum (1946–2025), American feminist video artist
- David Birnbaum (born 1956), Canadian politician
- Dieter Birnbaum (born 1931), German biologist
- Dietrich Birnbaum (1942–2017), German cardiac surgeon
- Eduard Birnbaum (1855–1920), German musicologist
- Effi Birnbaum (born 1954), Israeli professional basketball coach
- Ferdinand Birnbaum (1892–1947), Austrian pedagogue and psychologist
- Frank Birnbaum (1922–2005), cantor
- Fritz Birnbaum (1912 – 2006) Highly decorated German Panzer Officer WWII
- Georg Birnbaum (1890–1948), German dermatologist and university professor
- George E. Birnbaum (born 1970), American international political consultant, one of "Arthur's Kid"
- Hans Birnbaum (1912–1980), German lawyer, Ministerialbeamter and manager
- Heinrich Birnbaum (1403–1473), monk
- Henrik Birnbaum (1925–2002), American linguist and Slavist
- Heinz Birnbaum (1920–1943), German worker and resistance fighter against Nazism
- Immanuel Birnbaum (1894–1982), German journalist and publicist
- Jacob Birnbaum (1926–2014), human rights activist
- Jeffrey Birnbaum (born 1955), American columnist
- Jeremiah Birnbaum (born 1978), American singer/songwriter
- Johann Michael Franz Birnbaum (1792–1877), German legal scholar and playwright
- Johanna Birnbaum (1904–1978), German non-fiction - writer and novelist
- Johann Birnbaum (1763–1832), German jurist
- Karl Birnbaum (1878–1950), German neurologist
- Karl Birnbaum (agronomist) (1829–1907), German agronomist
- Karl Birnbaum (chemist) (1839–1887), German chemist
- Lillian Birnbaum (born 1955), Austrian - American film director and producer and photographer
- Linda Birnbaum (born 1946), toxicologist and director of the National Institute for Environmental Health Sciences
- Lucas Birnbaum (born 1997), Austrian ice hockey player
- Maria Birnbaum (politician) (1872–1959), German National Liberal politician ( DVP )
- Martin Birnbaum (actor) (born 1970), German actor and musical actor
- Menachem Birnbaum (1893–1944), book illustrator and portrait painter
- Menucha Birnbaum (born 1948), Israeli educator
- Morton Birnbaum (1926–2005), American physician
- Nathan Birnbaum (1864–1937), Jewish philosopher
- George Burns (born Nathan Birnbaum, 1896–1996), American singer and actor
- Nico Birnbaum (born 1977), German actor
- Norman Birnbaum (1926–2019), American sociologist
- Paula Birnbaum (born 1986), German actress and entrepreneur
- Philip Birnbaum (1904–1988), American translator of Jewish prayer book
- Roger Birnbaum (born 1950), American film producer
- Solomon Birnbaum, Yiddish linguist and son of Nathan Birnbaum
- Stephen Birnbaum (1937–1991), American travel writer and editor
- Steve Birnbaum (born 1991), American Major League Soccer player
- Uriel Birnbaum (1894–1956), painter, caricaturist, writer and poet
- Uta Birnbaum (1933–2022), German theater and film director
- Walter Birnbaum (theologian) (1893–1987), German theologian and university professor
- Walter Birnbaum (physicist) (1897–1925), German physicist
- Wilhelm Birnbaum (1895–1980), German politician of the SPD
- Yaakov (Jacob) Birnbaum (1926–2014), human rights activist
- Zdzisław Birnbaum (1878–1921), Polish violinist and conductor
- Zygmunt Wilhelm Birnbaum (1903–2000), Polish-American mathematician and statistician

== See also ==
- Barenboim, Yiddish form
- Bernbaum
- Berenbaum
- Birnbaumins
