= Sulamita Aronovsky =

Soviet-born British classical pianist and piano teacher (1929–2022)

- Sulamita Aronovsky, in the 1970s
- Born: Sulamita Ziuraitiene; 5 May 1929; Kaunas, Lithuania
- Died: 15 December 2022 (aged 93)
- Occupations: Pianist; Academic teacher

Sulamita Aronovsky (5 May 1929 – 15 December 2022, née Ziuraitiene) was a Lithuanian-born British classical pianist and piano teacher who spent her formative years in Moscow and Soviet-occupied Lithuania, moving to London in 1971.

Aronovsky was born in Kaunas, Lithuania on 5 May 1929. Her teachers included Lev Barenboim, Abram Schatzkes, Grigory Ginsburg and Aleksandr Goldenweiser. An experienced Juror of International Competitions, she founded the London International Piano Competition in 1991.

In 1971, after visiting family in the USA, she decided to defect to Britain, where she settled in Manchester, teaching at the Royal Northern College of Music.

In the 1990s, Aronovsky moved to London, where she served as Professor of Piano at the Royal Academy of Music.

Aronovsky's students included Peter Lawson, David Fanning, Julia Goldstein, Vovka Ashkenazy, Melani Mestre, Michael Bell, John Thwaites, Pamela Chowhan, Ian Flint, Amir Katz, Andrew Wilde, Ian Fountain, Stefan Ćirić, Junko Urayama, Nils Franke, Howard Evans, Gareth Jones, Nicolas Hodges, Beate Perrey, Jonathan Powell, Nicholas Angelich, Bartosz Barasinski, Raul Jimenez, Toby Purser, Nicolette Wong, Panos Karan, Mantautas Katinas, Adam Repa and Riyad Nicolas among others.

Aronovsky died on 15 December 2022, at the age of 93.
