= Panos Karan =

Greek-British classical pianist and conductor (born 1982)

Panos Karan (born 1982) is a British classical pianist, conductor and composer of Greek origin. He was born in Crete, and grew up in Athens, where he graduated from the American College of Greece. He studied piano at the Royal Academy of Music as a student of Sulamita Aronovsky. He made his professional debut performance at the Southbank Centre at age 19.

== Performances ==
- St Martin-in-the-Fields on 15 April 2004;
- Hermitage Theatre on 17 January 2008;
- Konzerthaus, Vienna on 6 May 2011;
- Weill Recital Hall at Carnegie Hall on 19 May 2007, 9 June 2009,11 October 2011 and 8 June 2018;
- Athens Concert Hall on 14 January 2011 and 26 June 2013;
- Tokyo Oji Hall on 16 March 2014;
- Queen Elizabeth Hall on 2 April 2014 and 1 April 2019;
- Teatro Nacional Sucre on 13 December 2012 and 29 April 2015;
- Blue Rose Hall at Suntory Hall on 14 March 2014, 3 August 2015 and 23 June 2018;
- St John's, Smith Square in November 2008 and 1 June 2015;
- Tokyo Opera City on 20 August 2015;
- Symphony Hall, Boston on 3 April 2016;
- Cadogan Hall on 11 June 2018;
- Suntory Hall on 6 August 2018;
- Sydney Opera House on 3 February 2020.

Karan's composition Surupanga was premiered at St.John's, Smiths Square, London on 1 June 2015.

== Recordings ==
Karan has recorded Rachmaninov Piano Concerto No. 3 with Toby Purser, conductor, and the Orion Symphony Orchestra.

In 2018 he recorded the 24 Chopin Études in live concert at London's Cadogan Hall.

== Awards ==
Karan was laureate at the 2004 "José Iturbi" International Piano Competition in Valencia, Spain.

== Humanitarian work ==
In 2011, he founded charity organisation Keys of Change, with the motto "Can music change the world? We believe it can", an organisation aiming to use music as a tool to improve to improve and empower the lives of young people around the world. With Κeys of Change he has completed musical projects in the Amazon, Sierra Leone, Uganda, India, Serbia and Japan.

In 2012, with the support of Keys of Change, he founded the Fukushima Youth Sinfoinetta, an orchestra made up of young musicians that came together in the wake of the 2011 disaster. In April 2014 and 2019 he performed with the Fukushima Youth Sinfoinetta at the Queen Elizabeth Hall, London, in August 2015 at the Tokyo Opera City and in April 2016 at Symphony Hall, Boston.

He has helped create the Kolkata Youth Orchestra and the Accra Youth Sinfonietta.

== Personal life ==
Karan has resided in London since 2000.
