= FYS =

FYS may refer to:

- Ferryside railway station, in Wales
- Fukushima Youth Sinfonietta, a Japanese orchestra
- Four Year Strong, an american rock band
- "FYS" (song), by Chlöe (2024)
