= 2011 MLS All-Star Game =

Soccer game played in Harrison, New Jersey

AT&T MLS All-Star Game 2011
- Event: 2011 Major League Soccer season
MLS All-Stars	Manchester United
(United States) (Canada)	(England)
0	4
- Date: July 27, 2011
- Venue: Red Bull Arena, Harrison, New Jersey
- Most Valuable Player: Park Ji-Sung (Manchester United)
- Referee: Jair Marrufo (United States)
- Attendance: 26,760

The 2011 Major League Soccer All-Star Game, held on July 27, 2011, was the 16th annual Major League Soccer All-Star Game, a soccer match involving all-stars from Major League Soccer. The MLS All-Stars faced Manchester United of the English Premier League for the second year running in the eighth MLS All-Star Game to feature international opposition. Manchester United won the game 4–0 with goals from Anderson, Park Ji-Sung, Dimitar Berbatov and Danny Welbeck.

The game was played at the Red Bull Arena in Harrison, New Jersey, making it the first MLS All-Star Game to be played in the New York metropolitan area since 1997.

== Rosters ==
=== MLS All-Stars ===
As of July 28, 2011.

Note: Flags indicate national team as defined under FIFA eligibility rules; some limited exceptions apply. Players may hold more than one non-FIFA nationality.

No.	Pos.	Nation	Player
1	GK	COL	Faryd Mondragón (Philadelphia Union)
2	DF	USA	Sean Franklin (LA Galaxy)
3	DF	USA	Heath Pearce (Chivas USA)
4	DF	COL	Jamison Olave (Real Salt Lake)
5	MF	USA	Kyle Beckerman (Real Salt Lake)
6	MF	USA	Nick LaBrocca (Chivas USA)
7	DF	USA	Matt Besler (Sporting Kansas City)
8	FW	USA	Chris Wondolowski (San Jose Earthquakes)
9	FW	JAM	Omar Cummings (Colorado Rapids)
11	MF	USA	Brad Davis (Houston Dynamo)
12	DF	USA	Bobby Convey (San Jose Earthquakes)
13	MF	USA	Jack Jewsbury (Portland Timbers)
14	FW	FRA	Thierry Henry (New York Red Bulls)
15	DF	USA	Tim Ream (New York Red Bulls)
17	FW	USA	Juan Agudelo (New York Red Bulls)♦
18	GK	USA	Kasey Keller (Seattle Sounders FC)

No.	Pos.	Nation	Player
20	DF	USA	Geoff Cameron (Houston Dynamo)
21	MF	GRN	Shalrie Joseph (New England Revolution)
22	GK	USA	Tally Hall (Houston Dynamo)
23	MF	ENG	David Beckham (LA Galaxy, captain)
26	DF	USA	Corey Ashe (Houston Dynamo)
99	FW	MEX	Omar Bravo (Sporting Kansas City)♦
—	GK	USA	Nick Rimando (Real Salt Lake)♥
—	DF	USA	Omar Gonzalez (LA Galaxy)†
—	DF	MEX	Rafael Márquez (New York Red Bulls)†
—	MF	USA	Brek Shea (FC Dallas)♠
—	MF	CAN	Dwayne De Rosario (New York Red Bulls)♥
—	MF	CUB	Osvaldo Alonso (Seattle Sounders FC)♥
—	MF	EST	Joel Lindpere (New York Red Bulls)♥
—	MF	BRA	Juninho (LA Galaxy)♥
—	FW	USA	Landon Donovan (LA Galaxy)†
—	FW	FRA	Eric Hassli (Vancouver Whitecaps FC)♥

♦ – Players selected by MLS Commissioner Don Garber † – Injured and unavailable for matchday ♠ – Unavailable due to FC Dallas playing in the CONCACAF Champions League match the same week of the All Stars game ♥ – "Inactive Roster" players voted for by other players in MLS

=== Manchester United ===
Note: Flags indicate national team as defined under FIFA eligibility rules; some limited exceptions apply. Players may hold more than one non-FIFA nationality.

No.	Pos.	Nation	Player
3	DF	FRA	Patrice Evra
4	DF	ENG	Phil Jones
5	DF	ENG	Rio Ferdinand
7	FW	ENG	Michael Owen
8	MF	BRA	Anderson
9	FW	BUL	Dimitar Berbatov
10	FW	ENG	Wayne Rooney
11	MF	WAL	Ryan Giggs
12	DF	ENG	Chris Smalling
13	MF	KOR	Park Ji-sung
14	FW	MEX	Javier Hernández
15	DF	SRB	Nemanja Vidić (captain)
16	MF	ENG	Michael Carrick
17	MF	POR	Nani

No.	Pos.	Nation	Player
18	MF	ENG	Ashley Young
19	FW	ENG	Danny Welbeck
20	DF	BRA	Fábio
21	DF	BRA	Rafael
23	DF	NIR	Jonny Evans
24	MF	SCO	Darren Fletcher
25	MF	ECU	Antonio Valencia
26	FW	FRA	Gabriel Obertan
27	FW	ITA	Federico Macheda
28	MF	IRL	Darron Gibson
32	FW	SEN	Mame Biram Diouf
34	GK	DEN	Anders Lindegaard
35	MF	ENG	Tom Cleverley
40	GK	ENG	Ben Amos

== Match ==
=== Details ===
July 27, 2011
8:30 p.m. EDT

MLS All-Stars (United States) (Canada)	0–4	(England) Manchester United
	Report	Anderson 20'; Park Ji-sung 45'; Berbatov 52'; Welbeck 68'

Red Bull Arena, Harrison, New Jersey
Attendance: 26,760
Referee: Jair Marrufo (United States)

MLS All-Stars	Manchester United

GK	1	(Colombia) Faryd Mondragón	(substituted off) 46'
RB	2	(United States) Sean Franklin	(substituted off) 46'
CB	4	(Colombia) Jámison Olave	(substituted off) 38'
CB	15	(United States) Tim Ream	(substituted off) 76'
LB	12	(United States) Bobby Convey	(substituted off) 61'
RM	21	(Grenada) Shalrie Joseph	(substituted off) 46'
CM	23	(England) David Beckham (c)
LM	11	(United States) Brad Davis	(substituted off) 61'
RF	9	(Jamaica) Omar Cummings	(substituted off) 46'
CF	99	(Mexico) Omar Bravo	(substituted off) 81'
LF	14	(France) Thierry Henry	(substituted off) 46'
Substitutes:
GK	18	(United States) Kasey Keller		(substituted on) 83'
GK	22	(United States) Tally Hall	(substituted on) 46'	(substituted off) 83'
DF	3	(United States) Heath Pearce	(substituted on) 46'
DF	7	(United States) Matt Besler	(substituted on) 76'
DF	20	(United States) Geoff Cameron	(substituted on) 38'
DF	26	(United States) Corey Ashe	(substituted on) 61'
MF	5	(United States) Kyle Beckerman	(substituted on) 46'
MF	6	(United States) Nick LaBrocca	(substituted on) 46'
MF	13	(United States) Jack Jewsbury	(substituted on) 61'
FW	8	(United States) Chris Wondolowski	(substituted on) 46'
FW	17	(United States) Juan Agudelo	(substituted on) 81'
Manager:
(Sweden) Hans Backe

GK	34	(Denmark) Anders Lindegaard	(substituted off) 46'
RB	4	(England) Phil Jones
CB	5	(England) Rio Ferdinand	(substituted off) 61'
CB	15	(Serbia) Nemanja Vidić (c)	(substituted off) 73'
LB	3	(France) Patrice Evra
RM	18	(England) Ashley Young	(substituted off) 61'
CM	16	(England) Michael Carrick	(substituted off) 61'
CM	8	(Brazil) Anderson	(substituted off) 73'
LM	13	(South Korea) Park Ji-sung	(substituted off) 61'
CF	9	(Bulgaria) Dimitar Berbatov	(substituted off) 61'
CF	10	(England) Wayne Rooney	(substituted off) 61'
Substitutes:
GK	40	(England) Ben Amos	(substituted on) 46'
DF	12	(England) Chris Smalling	(substituted on) 61'
DF	20	(Brazil) Fábio	(substituted on) 73'
MF	17	(Portugal) Nani	(substituted on) 61'
MF	35	(England) Tom Cleverley	(substituted on) 61'
FW	7	(England) Michael Owen	(substituted on) 61'
FW	19	(England) Danny Welbeck	(substituted on) 61'
FW	27	(Italy) Federico Macheda	(substituted on) 61'
FW	32	(Senegal) Mame Biram Diouf	(substituted on) 73'
Manager:
(Scotland) Sir Alex Ferguson

Most Valuable Player:
(South Korea) Park Ji-sung (Manchester United)
