= Steve Birnbaum =

American soccer player (born 1991)

Steven Birnbaum
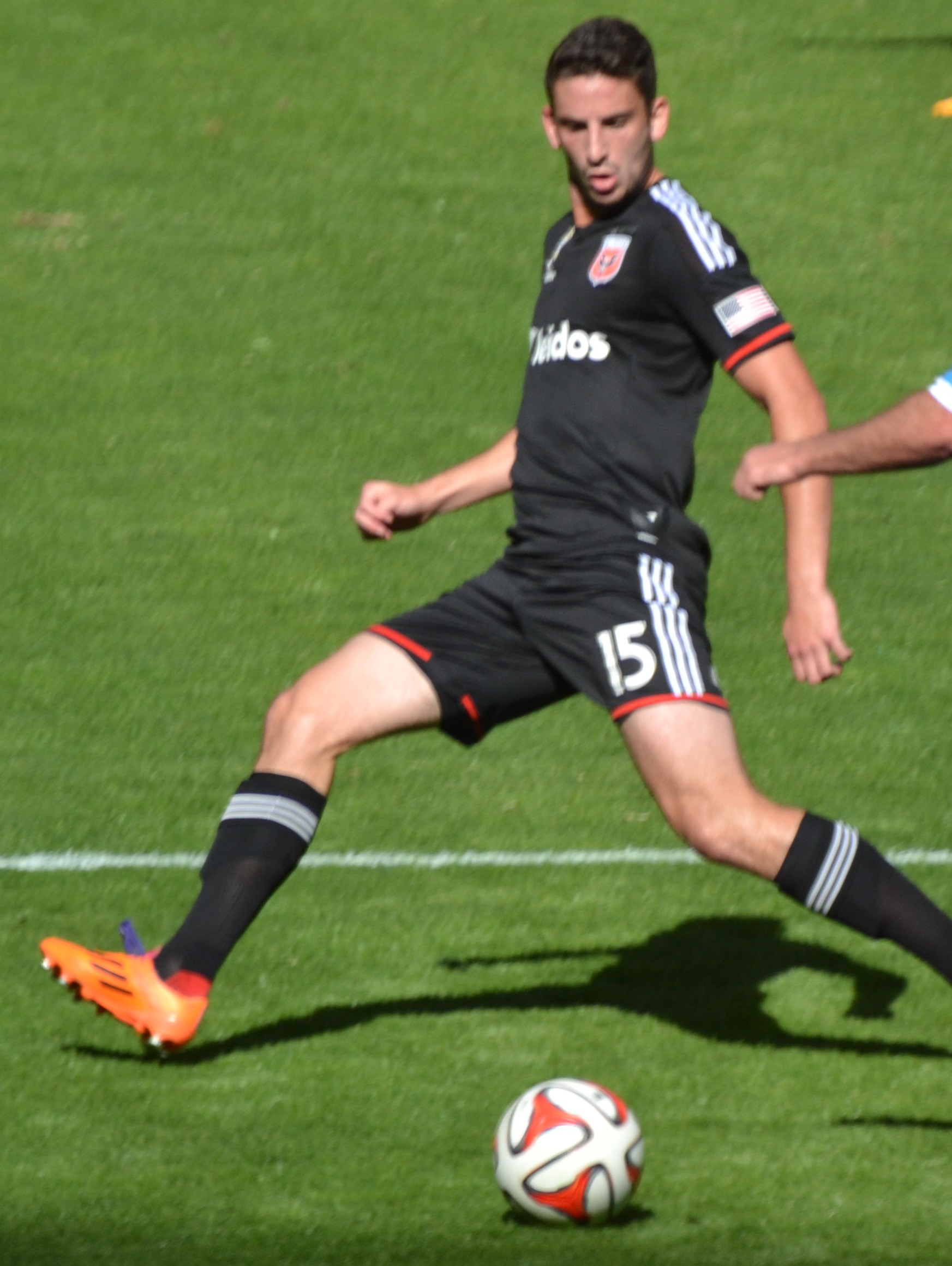
- Birnbaum with D.C. United in 2014

Personal information
- Full name: Steven Mitchell Birnbaum
- Date of birth: January 23, 1991 (age 35)
- Place of birth: Newport, California, U.S.
- Height: 6 ft 1 in (1.85 m)
- Position: Center-back

Youth career
- 2004–2008: Pateadores

College career
Years	Team	Apps	(Gls)
2009–2013	California Golden Bears	72	(12)

Senior career*
Years	Team	Apps	(Gls)
2010–2011	Orange County Blue Star	7	(0)
2014–2024	D.C. United	254	(13)
2014	→ Richmond Kickers (loan)	1	(0)
Total		262	(13)

International career^{‡}
2008–2009	United States U18		
2008	United States U20		
2015–2017	United States	11	(1)
- * Club domestic league appearances and goals as of June 3, 2024 ‡ National team caps and goals as of February 3, 2017

Steven Mitchell Birnbaum (born January 23, 1991) is an American former professional soccer player who is currently the sporting director for DC Power FC in the USL Super League. He was captain of and played as a center-back for D.C. United for the majority of his professional career. Birnbaum started every game for D.C. United in the 2018 season. In 2018 he played every minute in all 34 regular season games, and led Major League Soccer in total clearances, headed clearances, and aerials won, and in 2019 he again led the league in headed clearances and aerials won.

== Early life ==
Birnbaum was born in Newport, California. His hometown is Irvine, California. His mother is Peggy (Schmidt) Birnbaum, who played softball and volleyball at the University of Missouri. Birnbaum now celebrates Christmas as per his mother.

He completed high school early at Northwood High School at age 17. Birnbaum also played volleyball and lacrosse in high school.

== Youth and college career ==
Birnbaum played in the U.S. Soccer Development Academy for Southern California club Pateadores, of which he was the captain. He played for the U.S. U-18 and U.S. U-20 national teams in tournaments in Portugal and Mexico in 2008.

He played 72 games over five years of college soccer on scholarship at the University of California, Berkeley for the California Golden Bears men's soccer team, between 2009 and 2013, though redshirted the 2012 season, and was team captain. Birnbaum majored in social welfare. He was 2010 and 2011 Pac-12 All-Academic honorable mention, 2011 and 2013 All-Pac-12 first team, 2011 Jewish Sports Review first-team All-American, a 2013 Missouri Athletic Club Hermann Trophy semifinalist, an National Soccer Coaches Association of America (NSCAA) 2013 First Team All-American, NSCAA 2013 First Team All-Far-West Team, and a finalist for the Soccer News Net College Boot Player of the Year Award. While at college, Birnbaum also appeared for USL PDL club Orange County Blue Star in 2010 and 2011.

In 2012, he won a silver medal with the U.S. team in the 2012 Pan American Maccabi Games in Brazil.

== Professional career ==
Birnbaum was selected in the first round (2nd overall) of the 2014 MLS SuperDraft on January 14, 2014, by D.C. United. He was loaned out to their USL Pro affiliate Richmond Kickers in March 2014, making his professional debut on April 5, 2014, in a 3–1 win over the Pittsburgh Riverhounds. He is a crucial player of D.C. United because of his great defensive capabilities, and has played for them since 2014.

Following an injury to Jeff Parke, in 2014 Birnbaum became United's starting center back alongside Bobby Boswell. Birnbaum was named a finalist for the 2014 MLS Rookie of the Year, but lost to Tesho Akindele.

Birnbaum scored his first goal for United on February 26, 2015, in a CONCACAF Champions League quarterfinal leg against Alajuelense. In 2016, Birnbaum was the subject of several rumors regarding a possible transfer to Europe or Israel, with Maccabi Tel Aviv offering $1.5 million and mentioned as one possible destination. He was an MLS All Star in 2016. He became the team captain in 2017.

Birnbaum started every game for D.C. United in the 2018 season. In 2018 he played a career-high and club record 3,060 minutes, playing every minute in all 34 regular season games. He led the league in total clearances (217), headed clearances (120), and aerials won (173), and came in 6th in the voting for the MLS Defender of the Year Award.

In 2019, Birnbaum again started every game for D.C. United. His teamwork with fellow defender, Frédéric Brillant, and goalkeeper, Bill Hamid, helped DC to concede the lowest number of goals in the Eastern Conference in 2019. In 2019 he led the MLS in headed clearances (109) and aerials won (177).

Birnbaum was forced to miss the start of the 2024 season after undergoing knee surgery in the offseason, but stated he would continue to "play until the wheels fall off." Issues with his knee would persist throughout the season, as he suffered another knee injury just six matches into his return. Birnbaum recounted that there were days where he couldn't keep up with his children, and he struggled to get out of bed after games due to the pain in his knees and hips. In July 2024, he announced his retirement from professional soccer at the age of 33. At the time of his retirement, he had made the third-most appearances in D.C. United history, behind Hamid and Jaime Moreno. His final D.C. United appearance was in a mid-season friendly match again Scottish club Celtic on July 20, where he made a cameo appearance and was substituted off after 5 seconds as planned, before being honored by the club in a half-time ceremony. Members of the D.C. United team also wore white No. 15 T-shirts in honor of Birnbaum prior to the start of the match.

== International career ==
Birnbaum played for the United States U18 and United States U20 national teams in 2008.

Birnbaum debuted for the United States men's national soccer team on January 28, 2015. His first goal for the USMNT was a 90th-minute winner versus Iceland on January 31, 2016, a game in which he had already provided an equalizing assist to Michael Orozco to make it 2-2. He also played for the team in the 2016 Copa América Centenario and World Cup Qualifiers. In 2017, he played against Serbia and Jamaica.

== Administrative career ==
In January 2025, Birnbaum was named the first-ever sporting director for USL Super League club DC Power FC.

== Accolades ==
Birnbaum was inducted into the Greater Washington Jewish Sports Hall of Fame in 2017. He was inducted into the Southern California Jewish Sports Hall of Fame in 2020.

== Personal life ==
Birnbaum married his fiancé, Jeanne, on December 15, 2018, in Virginia. They live in Bethesda. He and Jeanne had a daughter together on October 16, 2019 and a son on Dec 1st, 2020. They have 2 dogs, a frenchie named Moose and a long-haired german shepherd named Mila. Mila is 1 year older.

== Career statistics ==
=== College ===
School	Season	NCAA Regular Season			NCAA Tournament		Other		Total	
School	Season	Division	Apps	Goals	Apps	Goals	Apps	Goals	Apps	Goals
California	2009	Div. I	17	0	0	0	0	0	17	0
California	2010	Div. I	18	1	2	0	0	0	20	1
California	2011	Div. I	16	1	0	0	0	0	16	1
California	2012	Div. I	2	0	0	0	0	0	2	0
California	2013	Div. I	16	9	3	1	0	0	19	10
NCAA Total			69	11	5	1	0	0	74	12

=== Club ===
As of June 1, 2024

Club	Season	League			National cup		Playoffs		Continental		Total	
Club	Season	League	Apps	Goals	Apps	Goals	Apps	Goals	Apps	Goals	Apps	Goals
D.C. United	2014	MLS	21	0	1	0	2	0	1 (Note: Appearance(s) in CONCACAF Champions League)	0	25	0
D.C. United	2015	MLS	22	2	1	0	3	0	5	1	31	3
D.C. United	2016	MLS	26	3	-		1	0	2	0	29	3
D.C. United	2017	MLS	26	0	-		-		-		26	0
D.C. United	2018	MLS	34	2	2	0	1	0	-		36	2
D.C. United	2019	MLS	34	1	2	0	1	0	-		37	1
D.C. United	2020	MLS	10	0	-		-		-		10	0
D.C. United	2021	MLS	21	2	-		-		-		21	2
D.C. United	2022	MLS	32	2	-		-		-		32	2
D.C. United	2023	MLS	22	1	-		-		-		22	1
D.C. United	2024	MLS	6	0	-		-		-		6	0
D.C. United	Total		254	13	6	0	8	0	8	1	276	14
Richmond Kickers (loan)	2014	USL	1	0	-		-		-		1	0
Career totals			255	13	6	0	8	0	8	1	277	14

=== International ===
United States
Year	Apps	Goals
2015	1	0
2016	8	1
2017	2	0
Total	11	1

As of goal scored on January 31, 2016

No.	Date	Venue	Opponent	Score	Result	Competition	Ref.
1.	January 31, 2016	StubHub Center, Carson, California	Iceland	3–2	3–2	Friendly	United States vs. Iceland - January 31, 2016 - Soccerway

== See also ==
- List of select Jewish football (association; soccer) players
