= Tally Hall (soccer) =

American soccer player

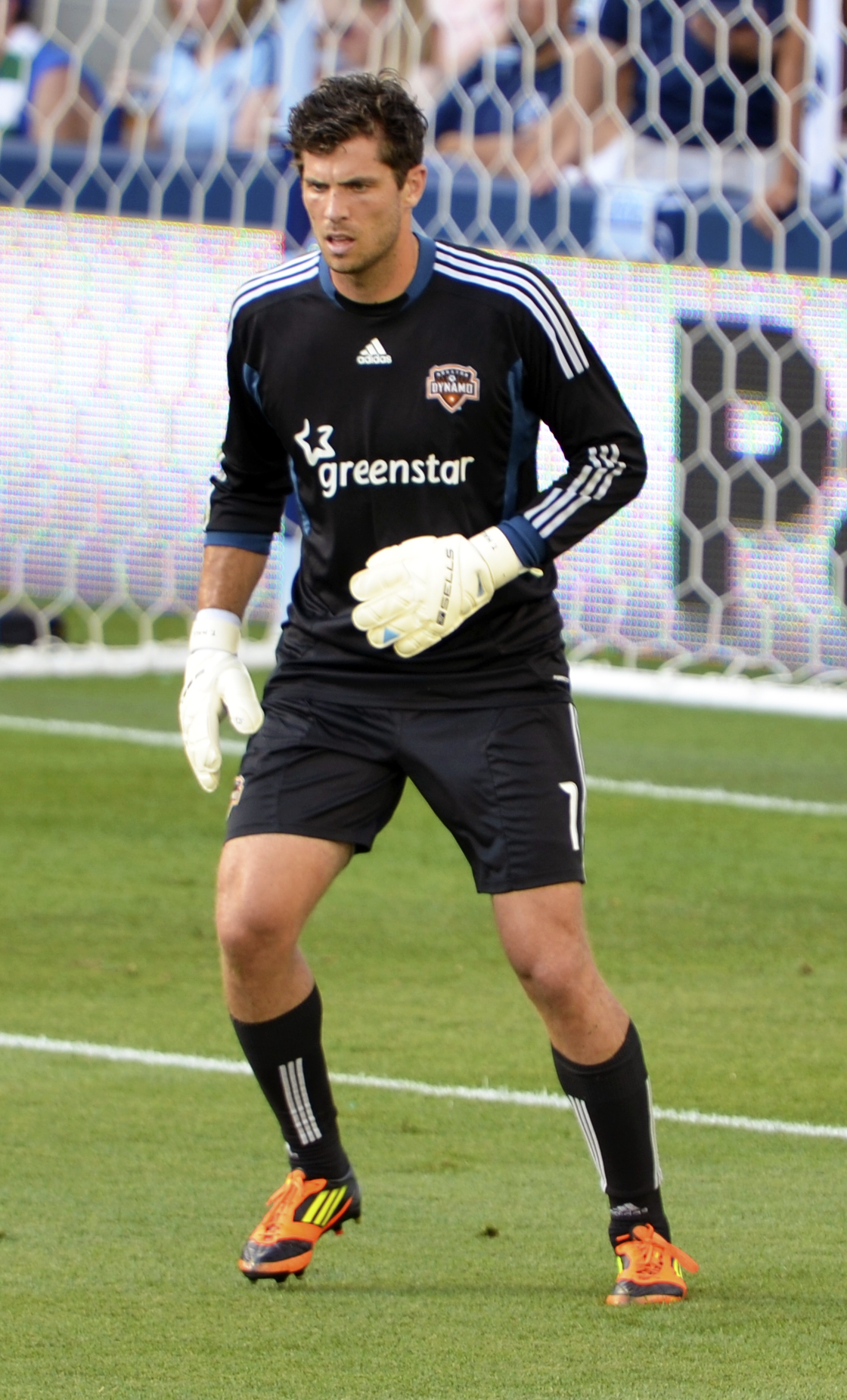

Personal information
- Full name: Talmon Henry Hall V
- Date of birth: May 12, 1985 (age 41)
- Place of birth: SeaTac, Washington, United States
- Height: 6 ft 4 in (1.93 m)
- Position: Goalkeeper

College career
Years	Team	Apps	(Gls)
2003–2006	San Diego State Aztecs		

Senior career*
Years	Team	Apps	(Gls)
2006	Boulder Rapids Reserve	8	(0)
2007–2009	Esbjerg	0	(0)
2009–2014	Houston Dynamo	130	(0)
2015	Orlando City SC	23	(0)
2016	D.C. United	0	(0)
Total		161	(0)
- * Club domestic league appearances and goals as of October 16, 2015

Talmon Henry "Tally" Hall V (born May 12, 1985) is an American retired soccer goalkeeper who spent eight of his ten professional seasons in Major League Soccer (MLS) with the Houston Dynamo (2009–2014), Orlando City SC (2015) and D.C. United (2016). He was a starter from 2011 to 2015 and helped the Dynamo reach MLS Cup in both 2011 and 2012. He was an MLS All-Star in 2011 and 2013. Since 2017, Hall has worked as a police officer for the Orlando Police Department.

== College ==
Born in SeaTac, Washington, Hall attended Gig Harbor High School. While searching for a college, Hall wanted to go to a Division 1 program in a warm climate with a full time goalkeeper coach. The only program matching his criteria who offered a scholarship was San Diego State, with the scholarship only being worth $500. Hall repaid the faith of the coaches and turned into a star for the Aztecs. He helped lead the Aztecs to the NCAA tournament in 2005 and 2006, their first appearances since 1989. Hall received numerous honors during his college career. He was named an NSCAA and College Soccer News All-American in 2005 and 2006, a semi-finalist for the M.A.C. Hermann Trophy in 2006, and was a first-team all-Pacific-10 Conference honoree for 2005 and 2006. During his college years, Hall also played with Boulder Rapids Reserve in the USL Premier Development League. In 2019, Hall was inducted to the Aztec Hall of Fame.

== Club ==
=== Esbjerg fB ===
Hall was drafted by the Los Angeles Galaxy in the 4th round 2007 MLS SuperDraft. He turned down the offer from LA and signed with Danish club Esbjerg fB instead. Esbjerg sporting director Niels Erik Søndergaard described Hall as well liked by his teammates, positive, and having a professional attitude. Despite this, Hall was unable to get past Lars Winde on the depth chart, spending his time in Denmark as a backup and playing for the reserve team. When Esbjeg signed Lukáš Hrádecký in January 2009 as the new backup goalkeeper, Hall and the club officials agreed it was time for him to move on in order to find first team opportunities.

=== Houston Dynamo ===
Hall signed with Major League Soccer club Houston Dynamo on January 23, 2009. During his first season in Houston, Hall served as the backup to Pat Onstad and did not make a league appearance, although he did feature in cup competitions. He made his Dynamo debut on July 1, 2009, getting 3 saves in a 2–0 win over the Austin Aztex in the U.S. Open Cup third round. Hall kept another shutout in his next appearances, Houston's 4–0 win over the Charleston Battery in the Open Cup quarterfinals. In the semifinals, the Dynamo traveled to Hall's home state of Washington to face Seattle Sounders FC. Hall made 10 saves in the game, but the Dynamo lost 2–1. He made his continental debut on August 26, helping Houston to a 1–1 draw with Árabe Unido in the 2009–10 CONCACAF Champions League group stage. On October 21, Hall, as a goalkeeper, scored; the Dynamo still lost the game 3–2. Houston finished 3rd in the group and was eliminated, with Hall playing in 4 of the 6 group stage games.

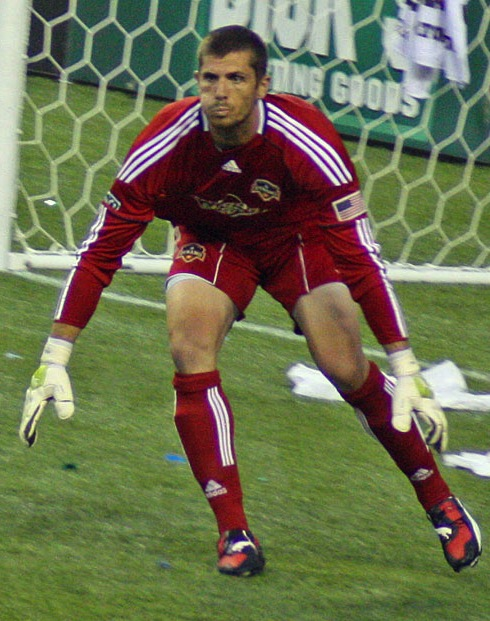
Hall in action for Dynamo against Seattle Sounders FC in August 2010.

In 2010, Hall again served as the backup to Onstad. He made his MLS debut on May 22, getting the start in a 2–0 win over D.C. United while Onstad was away on international duty with Canada. His next appearance came on June 29, helping Houston to a 1–0 win over Miami FC in the Open Cup. He would play in their next Open Cup game, but the Dynamo fell to Chivas USA 3–1. After Onstad went down with an injury in mid July, Hall started all four of Houston's games in the North American SuperLiga, helping them reach the semifinal. Hall also started four straight MLS matches before Onstad returned from injury. Hall missed the final month of the season due to an ankle injury.

Ahead of the 2011 season, the Dynamo declined the option on Onstad's contract and the Canadian keeper decided to retire (he would later come out of retirement briefly). Hall then beat out Tyler Deric for the starting position in preseason. In July 2011, Hall was named an MLS All-Star. He came on as a substitute in the game, a 4–0 loss to Manchester United. Hall played every minute of the regular season for the Dynamo, anchoring the second lowest scoring defense in the Eastern Conference as well as helping the Dynamo finish second in the Eastern Conference standings. Hall played every minute of the Dynamo's playoff run, keeping 2 clean sheets in 4 appearances as he helped the Dynamo reach MLS Cup 2011, where Houston lost to the Los Angeles Galaxy 1–0.

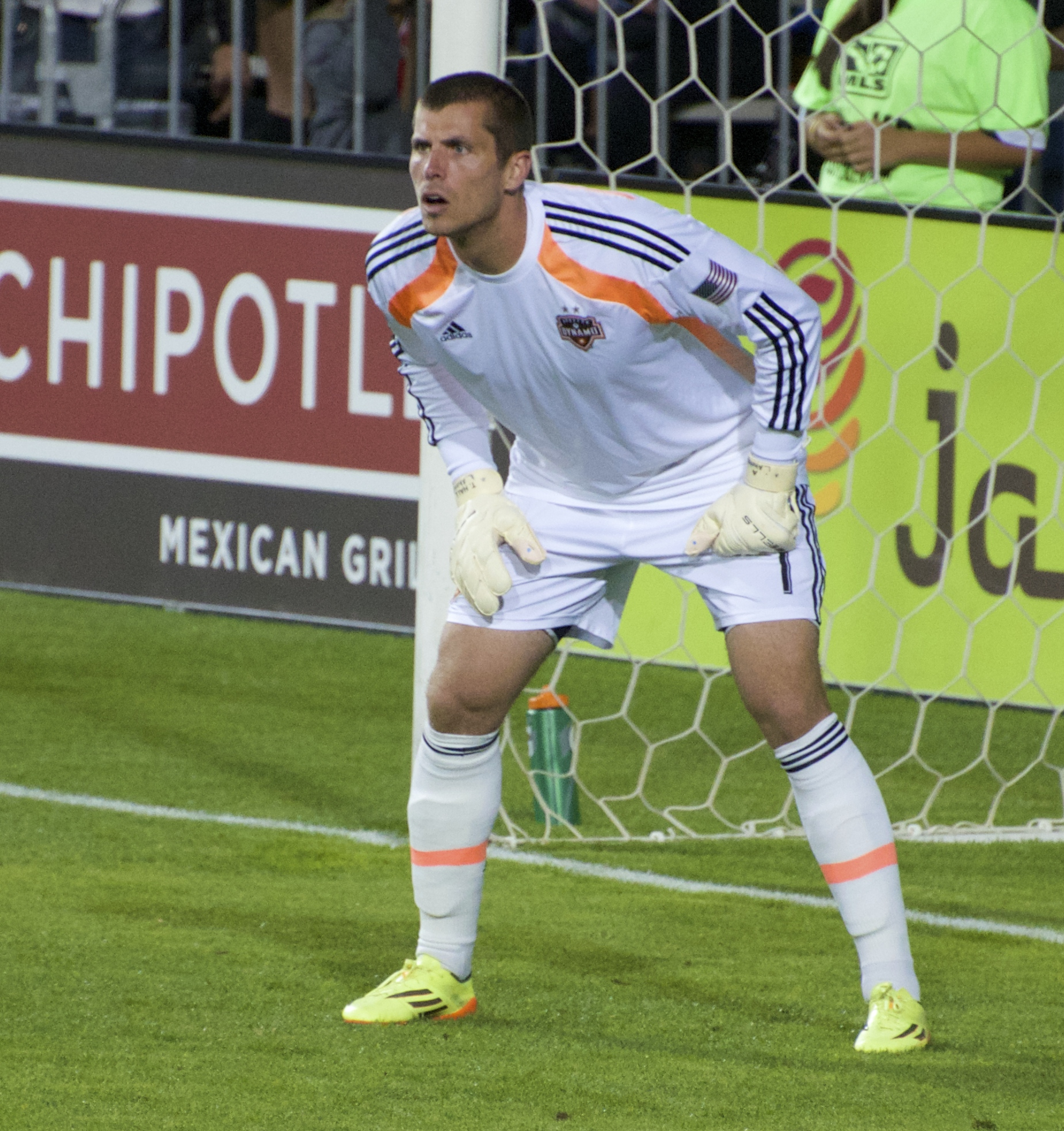
Tally Hall playing for the Dynamo against the San Jose Earthquakes in 2014.

Hall enjoyed another successful season in 2012, setting the Dynamo record for shutouts in a season with 12. He appeared in 33 of the 34 regular season games, getting a rest in the season finale. Hall helped Houston finish 5th in the Eastern Conference and qualify for the playoffs. Hall again played every minute of the playoffs as he kept 1 shutout in 6 appearances. Houston returned to the MLS Cup final and faced off with the Galaxy in a rematch of the previous final. This time the Dynamo lost by a score of 3–1.

In 2013, Hall played every minute of the regular season helping the Dynamo finish 4th in the Eastern Conference. In the playoffs, Hall played every minute of the Dynamo playoff run, keping 2 clean sheets in 5 appearances as he helped Houston reach the Conference Semifinals for the thirds straight season, where they lost to Sporting Kansas City 2–1 on aggregate. He also featured in continental competitions during the season, playing in both legs of the 3–1 aggregate loss to Santos Laguna in the 2012–13 CONCACAF Champions League quarterfinals as well as playing in 2 of the 4 games in the 2013–14 CONCACAF Champions League group stage. Hall enjoyed a strong season individually as well, being named a 2013 MLS All-Star reserve and being named Dynamo Team MVP.

In 2014, Hall started 24 of the first 25 MLS games of the year for Houston before going down with a torn right ACL on August 29 in a 3–1 win over Sporting Kansas City. The Dynamo would end up missing the playoffs, finishing 8th in the conference.

=== Orlando City ===
On October 28, 2014, it was announced that Hall was traded to MLS expansion team Orlando City SC ahead of their inaugural season in exchange for allocation money and an international roster spot.

On May 17, 2015, Hall made his Orlando City debut after recovering from his torn ACL, playing the full 90 minutes in a 4–0 win over the LA Galaxy. He started 23 straight games for Orlando before suffering a torn meniscus in his right knee on October 16 during a 2–1 win over New York City FC. Hall underwent surgery on October 20, keeping him out of the regular season finale. Despite missing significant time due to injury, Hall was voted the Fans' Player of the Year.

On November 25, 2015, Orlando City declined Hall's contract option.

=== D.C. United ===
On April 1, 2016, Hall signed with D.C. United. On July 29, 2016, he retired from professional soccer.

== International ==
Hall trained with the United States U-23 men's national soccer team multiple times, but never featured in a game. He was called up to the full United States national team for the January camp in 2013 and was called up for a World Cup Qualifying game against Jamaica in 2013, but never earned a cap.

== Career statistics ==
=== Club ===
Club	Season	League			Playoffs		Open Cup		CONCACAF		Total	
Club	Season	Division	Apps	Goals	Apps	Goals	Apps	Goals	Apps	Goals	Apps	Goals
Houston Dynamo	2009	MLS	0	0	0	0	3	0	4 (Note: Appearances in CONCACAF Champions League)	1	7	1
Houston Dynamo	2010	MLS	5	0	—		2	0	4 (Note: Appearances in North American SuperLiga)	0	11	0
Houston Dynamo	2011	MLS	34	0	4	0	0	0	—		38	0
Houston Dynamo	2012	MLS	33	0	6	0	0	0	0	0	39	0
Houston Dynamo	2013	MLS	34	0	5	0	0	0	4 (Note: Two appearances in 2012–13 CONCACAF Champions League, two in 2013–14 CONCACAF Champions League)	0	43	0
Houston Dynamo	2014	MLS	24	0	—		2	0	—		26	0
Houston Dynamo	Dynamo Total		130	0	15	0	7	0	12	1	164	1
Orlando City SC	2015	MLS	23	0	—		2	0	—		25	0
D.C. United	2016	MLS	0	0	0	0	0	0	0	0	0	0
Career total			153	0	15	0	9	0	12	1	189	1

== Honors ==
=== Club ===
Houston Dynamo

- MLS Eastern Conference Championship: 2011, 2012

=== Individual ===
- MLS All-Star: 2011, 2013
- Houston Dynamo Team MVP: 2013
- Orlando City SC Fans' Player of the Year: 2015
- Aztec Hall of Fame: 2019

== Post-playing career ==
Hall was sworn in as an Orlando Police Department officer in late-March 2017.

== Personal life ==
Hall was born in SeaTac, Washington and raised in Gig Harbor, Washington by his parents Talmon and Gail. The elder Talmon served as a firefighter. He met his wife Erica while he was at San Diego State. She was a midfielder for the Aztecs women's soccer team. They began dating in 2004 and got married in December 2007. Together they have two sons and one daughter.

In 2012, Hall and Dynamo teammate Brad Davis founded Banded Brigade Outdoors. The charity takes current and former members of the U.S. Armed Forces and their families on fishing and hunting trips to help them recover from physical and mental injuries and build relationships with other veterans. Hall felt compelled to start a charity for veterans due to his personal connections to the military, with both of his grandfathers serving in the Navy, his wife's grandfather being a Marine, and his brother serving in the Air Force.
