= Paul Fincham =

British composer

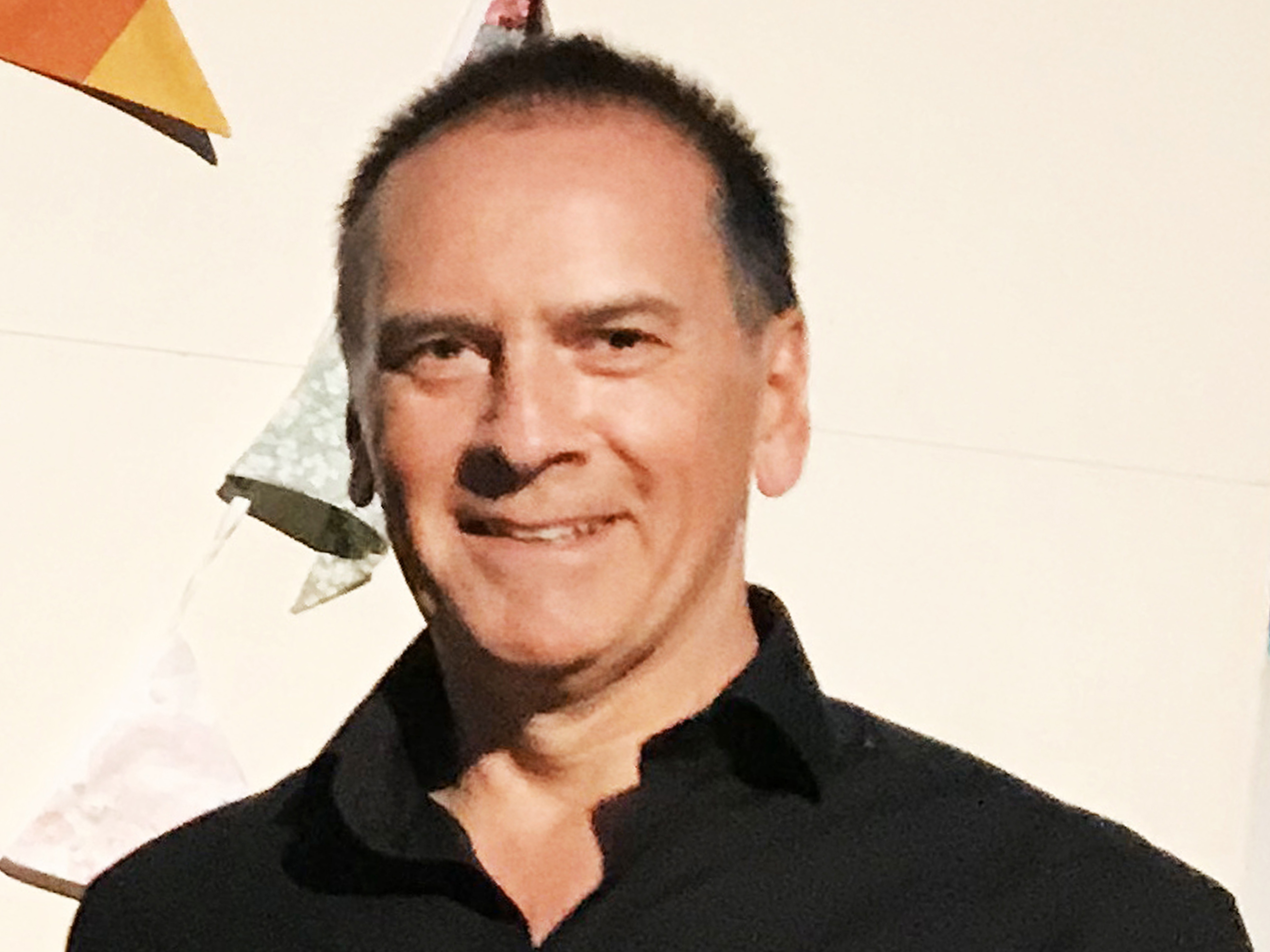
- Fincham in 2018
- Born: 23 January 1959 (age 67); London, England
- Education: Tonbridge School; Gonville and Caius College, Cambridge
- Occupation: Composer
- Relatives: Peter Fincham, brother
- Website: www.paulfincham.com

Paul Timothy Fincham (born 23 January 1959) is a British composer.

== Early life and family ==
Fincham is the younger brother of television producer Peter Fincham. Educated at the independent Tonbridge School, Fincham read music at Gonville and Caius College, Cambridge. Whilst at Cambridge, he was music director of the Cambridge Footlights. In 2012, following a career in the corporate world, Fincham returned to composing, based in London.

== Notable compositions ==
Fincham backstage at the Royal Albert Hall with presenter Alan Titchmarsh (left) and conductor Toby Purser (right)

In February 2017, Fincham's first feature film score for A Reason to Leave won Best Original Score at the London International Filmmakers Festival. The film, written and directed by Norman Gregory, also won Best Film at the same awards.

Later that year, Fincham was commissioned by the London Philharmonic Choir to write a new Christmas carol. On 20 December 2017, "Ring the Bells" was premiered at the Royal Albert Hall at the choir's concerts presented by Alan Titchmarsh. In 2018, "Ring the Bells" was published by Boosey & Hawkes.

In 2018, Fincham was commissioned by the British Museum to write a new work inspired by their Celtic Collection. On 21 June 2018, along with his violin piece, Suilven, Awen (meaning poetic inspiration in ancient Welsh/Breton/Cornish) was premiered by the London Philharmonic Choir under their artistic director, Neville Creed.

Fincham's first opera The Happy Princess, based on "The Happy Prince" by Oscar Wilde, with a libretto by Jessica Duchen, was premiered by the Youth Company at Garsington Opera in August 2019.
