= Barenboim (surname) =

- Pronunciation: /ˈbærənbɔɪm/ German: [ˈbaːʁənbɔʏm]
- Language: Yiddish

Origin
- Meaning: 'pear-tree'

Barenboim is a Yiddish surname. Notable people with the surname include:

- Daniel Barenboim (born 1942), pianist and conductor
- Isaac Yulisovich Barenboim (1910–1984), Soviet theorist and bridge building practitioner
- Lev Barenboim (1906–1985), Russian pianist and musicologist
- Michael Barenboim (born 1985), a classical violinist

== See also ==
- 7163 Barenboim, main-belt minor planet
- Birnbaum, German form
