= Bernbaum =

Bernbaum is a variation of German surname Birnbaum. Notable people with the surname include:

- Ernest Bernbaum (1879–1958), American educator, scholar, and writer
- Gerald Bernbaum (1936–2017), educationist and university administrator

== See also ==
- Berenbaum
