= Heinrich Birnbaum =

Carthusian German monk

Heinrich Birnbaum (1403 – 19 February 1473), also known as De Piro (the Latinized form of his German name), was a Carthusian German monk.

== Life ==
Little is known of him before his entrance into the Carthusian monastery at Cologne on 14 March 1435, at the age of 32 years. On account of his edifying example in the observance of the rule and his extensive scriptural and theological learning he was highly esteemed by his confrères, and as early as 1438, only three years after his entrance into the order, he became prior of the monastery of Mont-Saint-André at Tournai (Doornik) in Belgium. Birnbaum instituted reforms in the various monasteries over which he became prior, restoring the austere monastic discipline established by the founder Bruno of Cologne.

After holding the position of prior at Mont-Saint-André for 7 years, he was active in the same office successively at Wesel in the Duchy of Cleves, until 1457; at Rettel in Lorraine, until 1459; at Trier, until 1461; and at Diest in Belgium, until 1463. In 1463 he was appointed prior at Liège, but ill health forced him to resign this position and retire to the Carthusian monastery at Cologne, where he had spent the first days of this monastic life. The remaining ten years of his life Birnbaum spent in writing several ascetic works and in preparing for a happy death. Among those with him at that time in the Carthusian monastery of Cologne were Hermann Appeldorn (died 1472), Hermann Grefken (died 1480), Heinrich von Dissen (died 1484), and Werner Rolevinck (died 1502).

== Works ==
Birnbaum wrote for the instruction and direction of the members of his order a number of works, many of which, however, have not yet been put in print, also:

- "Defensio pro Immaculato Conceptu B.M.V."
- "Excepta ex malo granato cum nonnullis conjunctis"

He has often been confused with his uncle of the same name, one of the most learned jurists of the 15th century, who was for some time provost of St. Kunibert's at Cologne, and who died in 1439.
