= Sean Franklin =

American soccer player (born 1985)

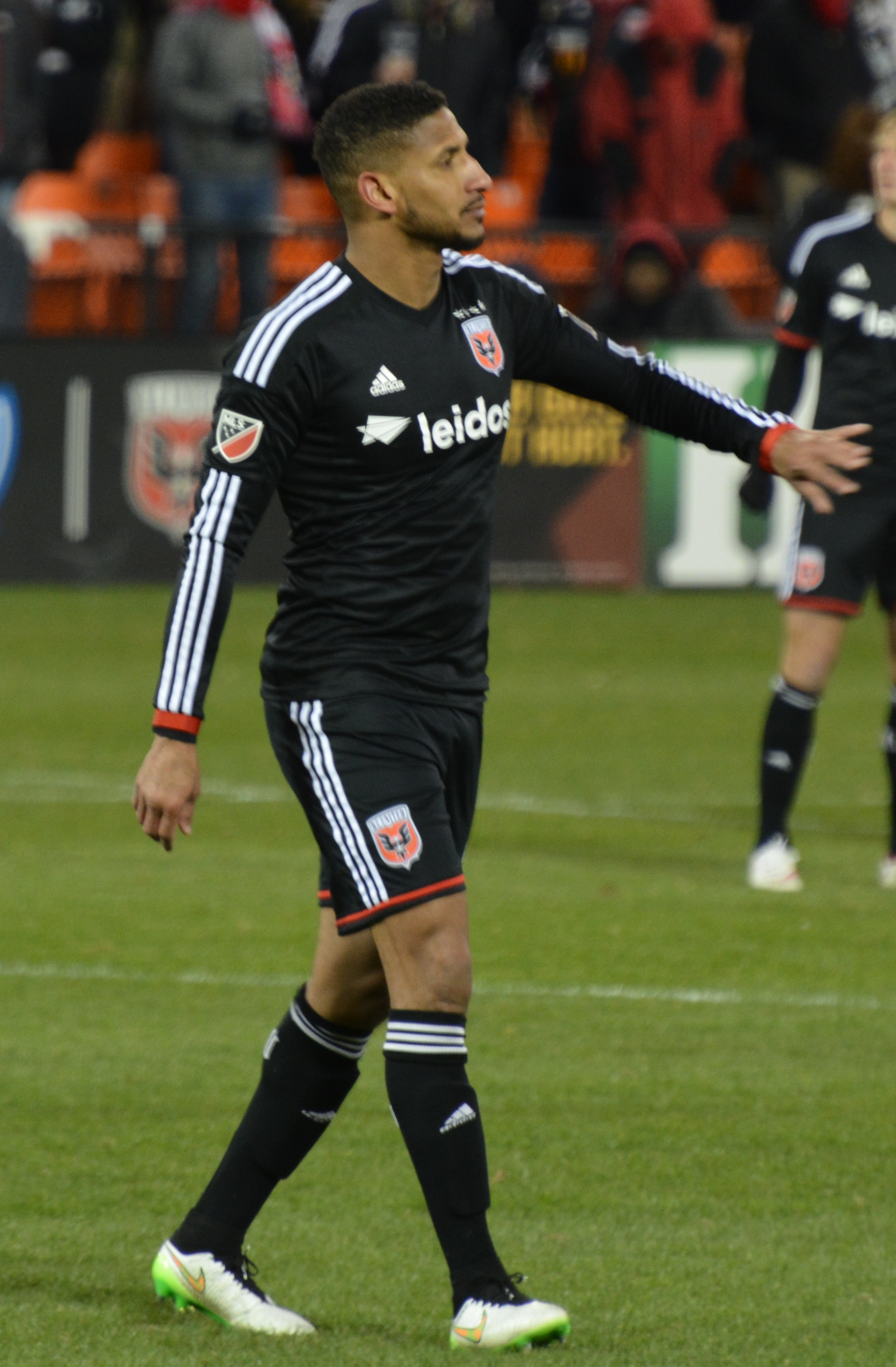
- Sean Franklin Playing for D.C. United

Personal information
- Full name: Sean Michael Franklin
- Date of birth: March 21, 1985 (age 41)
- Place of birth: Panorama City, California, U.S.
- Height: 5 ft 10 in (1.78 m)
- Position: Defender

College career
Years	Team	Apps	(Gls)
2004–2007	Cal State Northridge Matadors		

Senior career*
Years	Team	Apps	(Gls)
2006–2007	San Fernando Valley Quakes	31	(4)
2008–2013	Los Angeles Galaxy	160	(5)
2014–2017	D.C. United	101	(3)
2018	Vancouver Whitecaps FC	11	(0)
Total		303	(12)

International career^{‡}
2005	United States U20	2	(0)
2007	United States U23	1	(0)
2011	United States	1	(0)
- * Club domestic league appearances and goals as of November 5, 2018 ‡ National team caps and goals as of November 2, 2012

Sean Michael Franklin (born March 21, 1985) is an American former professional soccer player who played as a defender.

== Career ==
=== Youth and amateur ===
Franklin was a three-time letter-winner at Highland High School in Palmdale, California. He was named the Golden League's Most Valuable Player as a senior, and also earned all-area first-team honors in 2003 after helping the Bulldogs to a Golden League crown in 2003.

At Cal State Northridge, he was an invaluable member of the Matadors’ defense, starting over 50 games since 2004, being named to the All-Big West Conference team in both 2005 and 2006. During his college years Franklin spent two years with the San Fernando Valley Quakes of the USL Premier Development League, helping them reach the playoffs for the first time in 2007, although his campaign was cut short when he broke his arm in the playoff semi-final against BYU Cougars.

=== Professional ===
Franklin was the fourth overall pick in the 2008 MLS SuperDraft, selected by the Los Angeles Galaxy, and made his MLS debut in Galaxy's home opener against San Jose Earthquakes on April 3, 2008.

In late April, Greg Daurio reported coach Gullit saying Franklin had been their best player, saying "I think again he played an excellent game. If you see how he goes into midfield, gives long balls to David (Beckham) all the time, I think he's made huge progress. That makes me happy." Franklin was awarded MLS Rookie of the Year for the 2008 season. He beat fellow finalists Geoff Cameron and Kheli Dube to the award.

Franklin missed the majority of the 2009 MLS season after undergoing surgery to repair a hamstring tear he suffered during a game against Columbus Crew on May 17, 2009.

He signed a new contract with Los Angeles on December 23, 2011.

Franklin was selected by D.C. United in the 2013 MLS Re-Entry Draft and signed with D.C. shortly thereafter. He scored his first goal for D.C. on April 26, 2014, in a 4–1 win against FC Dallas. On December 19, 2016, D.C. United re-signed Franklin in a multiyear contract. On November 28, 2017, his contract option with United was declined.

On February 22, 2018, Franklin signed for MLS side Vancouver Whitecaps FC as a free agent.

Franklin was released by Vancouver at the end of their 2018 season.

=== International ===
Franklin was called up to the U.S. under-20 men's national team during the spring of 2004, and played 90 minutes for the U-23 team in a 0–0 draw with Japan in Japan in 2007.

He was called up to the senior men's squad twice in 2008 and 2009. He was unused in the World Cup qualifier against Guatemala on November 18, 2008, and withdrew from the camp which faced Sweden on January 24, 2009, with a hernia injury.

He made his senior debut on January 22, 2011, in a friendly match against Chile.

== Honors ==
Los Angeles Galaxy

- MLS Cup: 2011, 2012
- Major League Soccer Supporters' Shield; 2010, 2011

=== Individual ===
- MLS Rookie of the Year: 2008
- MLS All-Star: 2011, 2014
