= Berenbaum =

Berenbaum is a surname. Notable people with the surname include:

- Abe Berenbaum, American international table tennis player
- David Berenbaum, American screenwriter and actor
- May Berenbaum (born 1953), American entomologist
- Michael Berenbaum (born 1945), American academic, writer, and film director
- Shmuel Berenbaum (1920–2008), American rabbi

== See also ==
- Barenboim
- Bernbaum
- Birnbaum (surname)
