= Giovinco =

Giovinco (Italian: [dʒoˈviŋko]) is an Italian surname, may refer to:

- Giuseppe Giovinco, Italian footballer, brother of Sebastian
- Sebastian Giovinco, Italian footballer
- Steve Giovinco, American photographer

== Other ==
- Giovinco Ice Piedmont, ice piedmont of Antarctica
