= Stephen Birnbaum =

American writer

- Born: Circa 1937
- Died: December 20, 1991 (aged 54); New York City, New York, U.S.
- Occupations: Writer; editor; radio and television commentator; business owner
- Spouse: Alexandra Mayes Birnbaum
- Writing career
- Language: English
- Subject: Travel

Stephen Birnbaum (c. 1937 – December 20, 1991) was an American writer, journalist and commentator best known for travel commentary and guide books. In addition to print media, he worked in television and radio, including appearances on three major U.S. commercial broadcast networks.

== Career ==
Birnbaum worked as a managing editor for Fodor's travel guides, and later created his own series of guide books, the Birnbaum Travel Guides, which up to the time of his death had encompassed 36 books. Books in the series were published by HarperCollins or the Houghton Mifflin Company.

For more than 14 years, he provided travel commentary on the CBS Radio Network, working at flagship station WCBS (AM), in New York. Before that, he had been a guest on ABC's Good Morning America, the CBS Morning News and NBC's Today show, and had been travel editor for the syndicated Independent Network News program.

He wrote articles for numerous magazines, including Good Housekeeping, Esquire and Playboy. At the time of his death, he was Good Housekeeping's travel editor, and the author of a twice-weekly travel column that was syndicated by Tribune Media Services and published in several U.S. newspapers. In 1976, he became a co-owner of the then three-year-old Diversion magazine (ISSN 0363-4825), a now-defunct, monthly travel and leisure magazine for physicians. The magazine was sold to Hearst Corporation in 1984, but Birnbaum remained its editorial director until his death.

He edited The Best of Walt Disney World, that theme park's official guide book, as well as the official guide for Disneyland. In the 1980s, he also sold audio-tape walking tours, but found sales of tapes to be relatively slow compared with his books.

== Personal life ==
Stephen Birnbaum died of leukemia in 1991, at the age of 54, in New York City. At the time of his death he had been living in Manhattan. He had been married for 17 years to his second wife Alexandra Mayes Birnbaum, who shared his interest in travel and had been a business partner and longtime co-editor of the Birnbaum Travel Guides. After his death, she was hired to fill his role as travel commentator at radio station WCBS-AM. She also continued editing travel guide books under the "Birnbaum's" name, with HarperCollins, as well as updated editions of the Disney theme park guide books.
