= Brigitte Birnbaum =

German author (1938–2024)

Brigitte Birnbaum (29 May 1938 - 23 February 2024) was a German author of books, mainly for children and young people.

== Life ==
Brigitte Birnbaum (also Birnbaum-Fiedler) was born in Elbing (as it was known at that time), a manufacturing town and administrative centre in East Prussia, positioned near the coast between Danzig and Königsberg. War broke out shortly after her first birthday. In 1945 her family was caught up in the "ethnic cleansing" of the time, ending up in Mecklenburg, the northern part of what had now become the Soviet occupation zone (after October 1949 the German Democratic Republic). She passed her school leaving exams (Abitur), a necessary hurdle along the way to a university level education, and embarked on an apprenticeship as an assistant pharmacist.

She next spent three years studying literature at the German Institute for Literature in Leipzig. Armed with her degree, she became an antique books dealer. Her books for children began to appear in the early 1960s. She lived in Schwerin between 1960 and 2003, supporting herself as a freelance author, formally, from 1968. She lived in Hamburg for ten years from 2003, after which she relocated back to Schwerin.

== Awards and honours ==
- 1985 Arts Prize of the Society for German–Soviet Friendship

== Publications ==
=== For children and young people ===
- Bert, der Einzelgänger. Kinderbuchverlag, Berlin 1962
- Reise in den August. Kinderbuchverlag, Berlin 1967 (illustrations by Kurt Klamann)
- Winter ohne Vater. Kinderbuchverlag, Berlin 1977
- Ab morgen werd ich Künstler. A tale from the life of Heinrich Zilles. Kinderbuchverlag Berlin 1977 (Edition for West Germany and West Berlin published as: Der Pinselheinrich. Eine Zille-Geschichte für Kinder, Elefanten Press 1986, ISBN 3-88520-217-4)
- Das Siebentagebuch. Kinderbuchverlag, Berlin 1981
- Der Hund mit dem Zeugnis. Kinderbuchverlag, Berlin 1971 (illustrations by Maria Radoslavova-Finger)
- Löwen an der Ufertreppe. Kinderbuchverlag, Berlin 1981 (illustrations by Konrad Golz)
- Tintarolo. Ein Buch für Kinder über Käthe Kollwitz mit Zeichnungen von Käthe Kollwitz. Elefanten Press, Berlin (West) 1981. ISBN 3-88520-059-7
- Alexander in Zarskoje, Kinderbuchverlag, Berlin 1982 (a tale about chnildhood by Alexander Puschkin)
- Kathusch. Kinderbuchverlag, Berlin 1986 (on the childhood and youth of Käthe Kollwitz)
- Fragen Sie doch Melanie! Kinderbuchverlag, Berlin 1987. ISBN 3-358-00051-6
- Von einem, der auszog, neue Eltern zu suchen und andere Erzählungen. Kinderbuchverlag, Berlin 1989. ISBN 3-358-01242-5
- Die Maler aus der Ostbahnstraße. From the lives of Hans and Lea Grundig. Kinderbuchverlag, Berlin 1990. ISBN 3-358-01556-4
- Wider die kleinen Mörder. Kiro-Verlag, Schwedt 1994. ISBN 3-929220-18-0
- Noch lange kein Sommer. Verlag Reinhard Thon, Schwerin 1998

=== Other ===
- Ernst Barlach. Annäherungen. Demmler Verlag, Schwerin 1996. ISBN 3-910150-32-2
- Fontane in Mecklenburg. Demmler Verlag, Schwerin 1994. ISBN 3-910150-22-5
- Spaziergänge durch Güstrow. Ein Stadtführer. Thon, Schwerin 1992. ISBN 3-928820-10-9 (Photos by Peter Reinhard)
