= Fukushima Youth Sinfonietta =

Japanese youth orchestra

The Fukushima Youth Sinfonietta (福島青年管弦楽団) is a youth orchestra based in Fukushima developed out of the aftermath of the 2011 Tōhoku earthquake and tsunami disaster. Panos Karan and the British NPO Keys of Change created the Fukushima Youth Sinfonietta (FYS) in March 2012 which mainly consists of middle-school students from the Fukushima Prefecture.

== Performances ==
=== London 2014 concert ===
In April 2014, the FYS performed at Queen Elizabeth Hall in London. The concert included a new musical work composed for the FYS by composer Ronald Corp. For the specific performance the FYS collaborated with professional British musicians of the Orpheus Sinfonia. During its visit in London, the FYS also performed at BBC Newsnight show

=== Tokyo 2015 concert ===
In August 2015, the FYS performed at Tokyo Opera City Concert Hall in Tokyo under the conductor Tetsuji Honna. For the specific performance the FYS collaborated with music students from Tōhō Gakuen School of Music and professional musicians from the Japan Philharmonic Orchestra. Her majesty the Empress Michiko of Japan attended the concert

=== Boston 2016 concert ===
In April 2016 the FYS visited United States for the first time and performed at Boston Symphony Hall in Boston to commemorate the 5th anniversary of the 2011 Tōhoku earthquake and tsunami disaster. The visit to Boston was part of the U.S.-Japan "TOMODACHI Initiative" and was also supported by Japan Society of Boston, the Boston Symphony Orchestra, the General Consulate of Japan in Boston, the U.S.-Japan Council and the American Embassy in Tokyo.

== See also ==
- List of youth orchestras
