= Charlie Horton =

American soccer player (born 1994)

Personal information
- Full name: Charles Andrew Horton
- Date of birth: September 14, 1994 (age 32)
- Place of birth: London, England
- Height: 6 ft 6 in (1.97 m)
- Position: Goalkeeper

Senior career*
Years	Team	Apps	(Gls)
2013–2014	Peterborough United	0	(0)
2014–2015	Cardiff City	0	(0)
2015	Leeds United	0	(0)
2016	D.C. United	0	(0)
2016	→ Richmond Kickers (loan)	10	(0)

International career^{‡}
2015	United States U23	4	(0)
- * Club domestic league appearances and goals as of May 19, 2016 ‡ National team caps and goals as of May 19, 2016

Charlie Horton (born September 14, 1994) is an American former professional footballer who played as a goalkeeper. Born in London, he is a former United States U23 international.

== Club career ==
=== United Kingdom ===
Upon turning pro, Horton was a backup goalkeeper for various clubs in the Football League Championship, and in Football League One. He was under a 3-year contract for Peterborough United, before being acquired by Cardiff City on a one-year contract and then by Leeds United on a 2-year deal.

=== United States ===
Horton was released from Leeds after asking to leave due to a personal private matter on November 23, 2015. On March 4, 2016, Horton signed with D.C. United of Major League Soccer.

Immediately after signing with United, Horton was sent on loan to their third division affiliate, the Richmond Kickers, where he has been their primary goalkeeper. Horton made his professional debut on May 18, 2016, starting and playing the entire match against Aromas Café FC in the U.S. Open Cup second round. Horton recorded one save and had a shutout in the 4–0 victory.

Horton was recalled from his loan in July 2016. He suffered a serious hand injury that same month that would require surgery. It would sideline him for the rest of the 2016 regular season. It was his second injury of the season after he was out for 7 weeks with a concussion. In February 2017, Horton was released by United having never made a senior appearance with the squad.

== Post-playing career ==
He later attended George Washington University in Washington, D.C., where he was recognized on multiple GW Athletics Academics Dean's lists from 2018–2020, was on the men's rowing roster, was a 2020 GW Ramsey Scholar, and received a Bachelor of Business Administration in finance. He worked for Morgan Stanley as an investment banking analyst in their mergers and acquisitions group and was formerly an associate at Hellman & Friedman, a private equity firm.

== Personal life ==
His mother, Cathy Horton, swam at the University of Michigan, was a priest of the Episcopal Church, and a corporate lawyer.

In 2010, his mother sued Avon Old Farms, a boarding school Horton attended in Avon, Connecticut, in both her and Horton's name.

On March 27, 2017, Horton filed a lawsuit against former D.C. United teammate Fabián Espíndola, coach Ben Olsen, and Major League Soccer. Espíndola allegedly assaulted Horton during practice and Horton received a concussion. The case is believed to have been resolved out of court.

== Statistics ==
As of May 25, 2016

Appearances and goals by club, season and competition
Club	Season	League			Cup		League Cup		Other^{[A]}		Total	
Club	Season	Division	Apps	Goals	Apps	Goals	Apps	Goals	Apps	Goals	Apps	Goals
United Kingdom			League		FA Cup		League Cup		Europe		Total	
Peterborough United	2013–14	League One	0	0	0	0	0	0	—		0	0
Cardiff City	2014–15	Championship	0	0	0	0	0	0	—		0	0
Leeds United	2015–16	Championship	0	0	0	0	0	0	—		0	0
United States			League		US Open Cup		Playoffs		North America		Total	
D.C. United	2016	MLS	0	0	0	0	—		0	0	0	0
Richmond Kickers (loan)	2016	USL	8	0	2	0	—		—		10	0
Total	United Kingdom		0	0	0	0	0	0	0	0	0	0
Total	United States		8	0	2	0	0	0	0	0	2	0
Career statistics			8	0	2	0	0	0	0	0	10	0
