= Lev Barenboim =

Soviet pianist and musicologist

Lev Aronovich Barenboim (Russian: Лев Аронович Баренбойм; 1906 in Odessa – 1985) was a Soviet pianist and musicologist.

Barenboim taught at the Leningrad Conservatory. He published a volume of Anton Rubinstein letters and discussed with Heinrich Neuhaus on his book The art of piano playing. After his death his collection of scores, music books and recordings was assigned to the Russian National Library.

== See also ==
- Barenboim
