= Toby Purser =

British conductor (born 1974)

- Born: 28 June 1974 (age 52); London, England
- Education: Winchester College; Oxford University; Royal Academy of Music
- Occupation: Conductor
- Website: www.tobypurser.co.uk

Toby Purser (born 28 June 1974) is a British conductor.

== Early life ==
Born in London, Purser was educated at the independent Winchester College where he was a chorister and music scholar. Purser read music at Oxford University, setting up the Oxford Philomusica and conducting the Oxford Sinfonietta. Purser studied conducting at Royal Academy of Music.

== Career ==
Purser (right) with presenter Alan Titchmarsh (left) and composer Paul Fincham (centre)

In 2005, Purser founded the Orion Orchestra offering performance opportunities to recent music graduates and free tickets to schools and charities to widen access to classical music. In 2018, Purser conducted the premiere of a commission by competition winner David Roche alongside engineers from Dyson, playing musical instruments they designed and made from vacuum cleaner parts.

Purser worked with Bampton Classical Opera, British Youth Opera, Buxton Festival, Chelsea Opera Group, Grange Park Opera, Longborough Festival Opera, Lyric Opera Dublin, Opera della Luna, Opéra national de Paris. At Pimlico Opera, Purser assembled casts combining inmates and professionals.

Purser serves as artistic director of the Peace and Prosperity Trust, a charity supporting music education in the Middle East.

In December 2017, Purser conducted the premiere of Paul Fincham's Christmas carol "Ring the Bells" at the Royal Albert Hall performed by the London Philharmonic Choir and presented by Alan Titchmarsh.

As ENO Mackerras Conducting Fellow, in 2018, Purser led the English National Opera in performances of Benjamin Britten's The Turn of the Screw at Regent's Park Open Air Theatre to rave reviews.

Following his appointment as music director of New Sussex Opera, Purser conducted Stanford's The Travelling Companion.
