= Bobby Boswell =

American soccer player (born 1983)

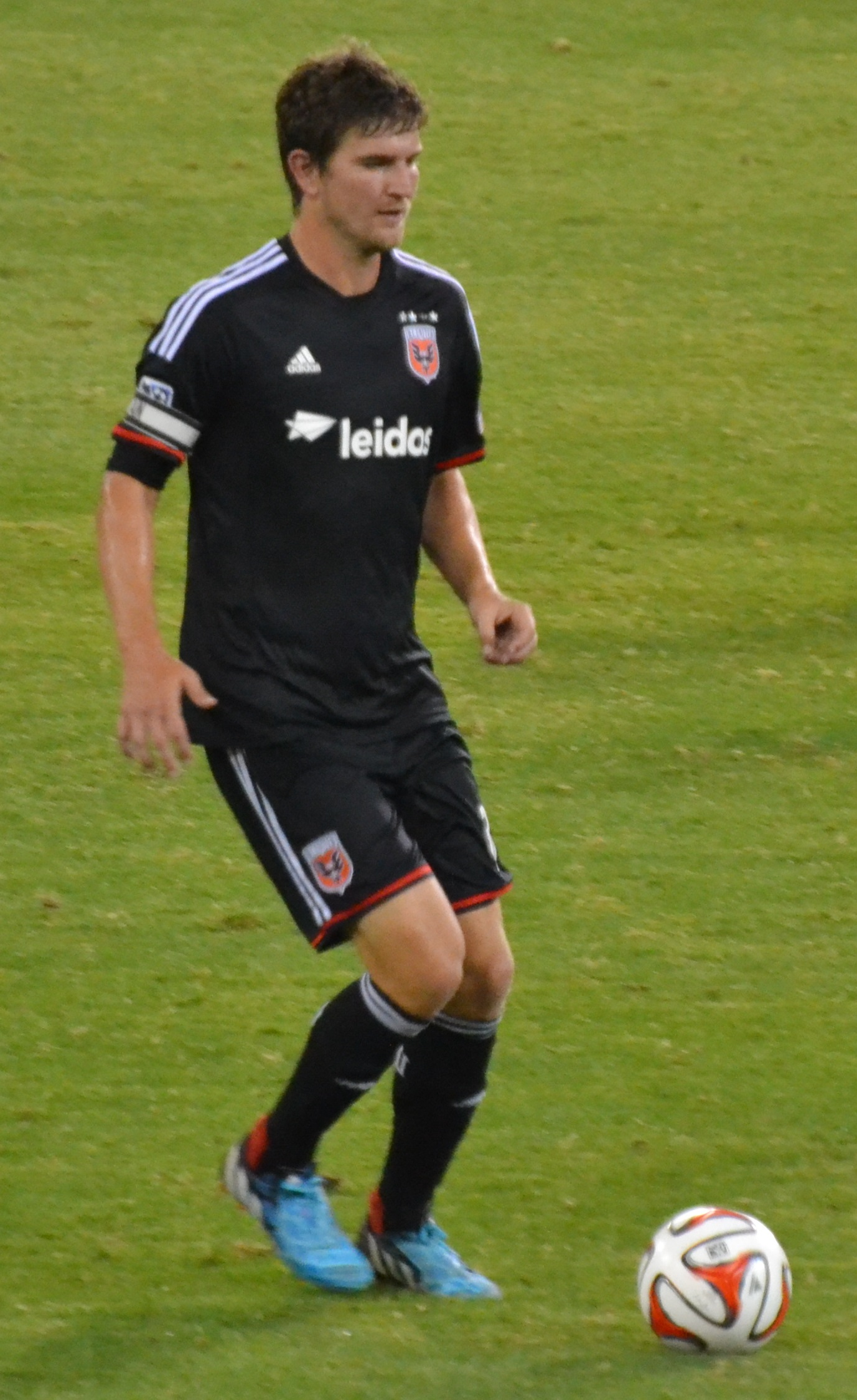
- Boswell with D.C. United

Personal information
- Full name: Robert Allen Boswell
- Date of birth: March 15, 1983 (age 43)
- Place of birth: Austin, Texas, U.S.
- Height: 6 ft 2 in (1.88 m)
- Position: Defender

Youth career
- Clearwater Chargers

College career
Years	Team	Apps	(Gls)
2001–2004	FIU Golden Panthers		

Senior career*
Years	Team	Apps	(Gls)
2005–2007	D.C. United	80	(4)
2008–2013	Houston Dynamo	177	(9)
2014–2017	D.C. United	108	(6)
2017	Atlanta United	1	(0)
Total		366	(19)

International career
2006–2007	United States	3	(0)
- * Club domestic league appearances and goals

Robert Allen "Bobby" Boswell (born March 15, 1983) is an American retired soccer player. He played his entire professional career in Major League Soccer, mostly with the Houston Dynamo and D.C. United. He retired in 2017 with over 360 appearances in MLS. His best season was in 2006, when he won the MLS Defender of the Year award.

== Early life and college ==
Boswell grew up in Tampa, Florida, and as a child he played for the Clearwater Chargers. At age 11, Bobby was a contestant on the show Nickelodeon GUTS. Although he came in second place, he was the first to climb the megacrag. He played college soccer at Florida International University in Miami, Florida.

== Professional career ==
=== D.C. United ===
Boswell was not drafted by a Major League Soccer club in either the 2005 MLS SuperDraft or the 2005 MLS Supplemental Draft. After impressing during pre-season, Boswell was signed by D.C. United as a discovery player. He earned a starting spot in the club's defense after Bryan Namoff had to miss the beginning of the season due to injury. He started the season well, but set the league record by scoring three own goals in a season.

During the 2006 MLS season, Boswell was the starting centerback for United, who finished with the best regular-season record and won the Supporters' Shield. Boswell was named an All-Star, and he started and played the entire All-Star match in the 1–0 victory over Chelsea, the defending English Premiership champions. He was named United's 2006 Defender of the Year and Humanitarian of the year. He was also named the 2006 MLS Defender of the Year and selected as a member of the Best XI.

=== Houston ===
At the end of the 2007 MLS Season, Boswell was traded by United to Houston Dynamo for backup goalkeeper Zach Wells and a second-round pick in the 2009 MLS SuperDraft. Boswell enjoyed success with the Houston Dynamo, helping the team to win the regular-season Western Conference title. At the conclusion of the 2008 MLS season, Boswell was named the team's defender of the year and the team's "iron man." He also received the team MVP award, as voted by the Houston Dynamo fans. Zach Wells, who he had been traded for, played sporadically in the 2008 season before retiring at the end of the season.

After the 2008 season, Boswell initially went to Europe in search of a new club but eventually signed a four-year extension with the Dynamo instead. He signed another new contract with Houston after the 2011 season. Boswell's contract with Houston expired after the 2013 season.

=== D.C. United ===
Boswell entered the 2013 MLS Re-Entry Draft. He returned to D.C. United on December 12, 2013, when D.C. selected him in stage one of the draft. On May 13, 2015, Boswell recorded his 300th appearance for D.C. United against expansion team, Orlando City SC. He scored his final goal for DC against the Houston Dynamo in the 62nd minute. The game ended in a 3-1 DC loss at home.

=== Atlanta United ===
On August 8, 2017, Boswell was traded by United to expansion team, Atlanta United in exchange for a third round pick in the 2019 MLS SuperDraft. Boswell announced his retirement in February 2018.

Upon retirement, Boswell was 7th on the all-time most MLS minutes played list, with 32,222 minutes in 366 appearances.

== International play ==
In January 2006, Boswell was called into his first training camp for the U.S. national team. He earned his first cap on February 19, 2006, in a 4–0 victory against Guatemala.

== Personal life ==
Boswell was named one of the 50 Most Attractive Bachelors in the November 2006 issue of Cosmopolitan Magazine as Mr. Virginia.

As a child, Boswell appeared on the Nickelodeon TV show GUTS as Bobby "Lightning" Boswell. At one point, he struggled to kick a soccer ball placed on a pedestal into a goal, missing the ball repeatedly, but still ended up winning the event. His older brother, Billy, also played soccer with FIU Golden Panthers. He has another brother named Chad and one named Drew. Their cousin is "Frasier" actor Adam Blake Boswell.

Boswell is married to Keri Chadwick. Boswell has 3 children. His nephew is Riley Boswell, a youth soccer player at H.B. Plant High School, being scouted by his uncle's own team, D.C. United.

Boswell stated that after retirement, he and his family moved back to Houston, Texas.

== Honors ==
D.C. United

- Major League Soccer Supporters' Shield: 2006, 2007

Individual

- MLS Defender of the Year: 2006
- MLS Best XI: 2006, 2014
