= 2013 D.C. United season =

D.C. United
2013 season
- General manager: Dave Kasper
- Head coach: Ben Olsen
- Stadium: RFK Stadium
- MLS: Eastern Conference: 10th Overall: 19th
- MLS Cup Playoffs: Did not qualify
- U.S. Open Cup: Winners
- Atlantic Cup: Runner-up
- Top goalscorer: League: Dwayne De Rosario (3 goals); Luis Silva (3 goals); Kyle Porter (3 goals); All: Dwayne De Rosario (8 goals)
- Highest home attendance: 18,019 vs. New York Red Bulls, April 13, 2013
- Lowest home attendance: 10,116 vs. Houston Dynamo, May 8, 2013
- Average home league attendance: Regular season: 13,718
Home colors	Away colors

The 2013 D.C. United season was the club's eighteenth, and their eighteenth season in Major League Soccer, the top division of American soccer. The regular season began on March 2 and concluded on October 27.

Outside of MLS play, the club competed in the U.S. Open Cup. Also, for the first time in their history, they played in the Walt Disney World Pro Soccer Classic, a preseason tournament to be held in February, after participating in the Carolina Challenge Cup for the past five seasons.

After a promising 2012 campaign, United's form took a sharp turn downward as injuries, underachievement from offseason acquisitions, and a loss of form caused the team to record the worst season in MLS history. The extremely poor season came as universal shock to fans and media, who thought United would be one of the top contenders in the Eastern Conference, and a potential candidate for the MLS Cup title.

United's top scoring players were Dwayne De Rosario, Luis Silva, and Kyle Porter, who each scored three goals. The club gave up four own goals—more goals than any player scored for the team in MLS play.

Despite their poor league play, United qualified for the 2014–15 CONCACAF Champions League by winning the 2013 U.S. Open Cup Final on October 1. That marked their 13th major honor, the most in North American soccer history. As of 2025, this is the most recent major title won by the club.

== Background: 2012 season ==
After four consecutive seasons of failing to qualify for the playoffs, D.C. United returned to the playoffs by finishing second in the Eastern Conference, and third in the overall tables, amassing a total of 58 points from a record of 17–7–10 (wins, losses, draws). In their return to the playoffs, D.C. United defeated their Atlantic Cup rivals, New York Red Bulls, 2–1 on aggregate. In the Eastern Conference Finals, D.C. United fell to Houston Dynamo 4–2 on aggregate, making it the furthest D.C. United went in the MLS Cup Playoffs since 2006.

Since neither the San Jose Earthquakes nor Sporting Kansas City reached MLS Cup 2012, D.C. United narrowly missed out on qualifying for the 2013–14 CONCACAF Champions League, which would have been United's third appearance in the newly revamped Champions League, their thirteenth overall CONCACAF club tournament, and their first since the 2009–10 season.

Elsewhere, United competed in the U.S. Open Cup, where they fell in the fourth round proper to Philadelphia Union in a penalty shoot-out. During the preseason, United won their third-straight Carolina Challenge Cup.

== Review ==
=== Offseason ===
One of the largest offseason news was the departure of longtime CEO of the club, Kevin Payne, who had been the chief executive officer and president of the D.C. United franchise since its inception in 1994. Payne left on November 27, 2012, reportedly on good terms with the club, to take over as the president of fellow Major League Soccer outfit, Toronto FC. He was announced as Toronto's president the next day, on November 28, 2012.

Prior to the 2012 MLS Re-Entry Draft, United declined options on four players; Mike Chabala, Emiliano Dudar, Maicon Santos and Stephen King. Santos, was selected by Chicago Fire in the first round of the Re-Entry Draft. Held on December 3, 2012, Santos was the only selection in the first stage of the re-entry draft. The second stage was held on December 14, 2012. There, United selected former-Vancouver Whitecaps FC midfielder, John Thorrington. In Thorrington's two seasons in Vancouver, he made 30 appearances.

=== Preseason/February ===
As of December 14, D.C. United will participate in four preseason exhibitions prior to the start of the regular season. Participating in the Walt Disney World Pro Soccer Classic for the first time in franchise history, United open the exhibition tournament on February 9, 2013 against the Tampa Bay Rowdies, the 2012 North American Soccer League (second division) champions. United will subsequently play against Sporting Kansas City and Montreal Impact.

Two weeks into the new year, the 2013 MLS SuperDraft was held, with D.C. United having the 17th overall pick. The club traded away their second round pick in this draft back in 2011 with New England Revolution. Needing defensive depth, it was anticipated that United was going to select a defender from the draft to help bolster the defense, in which they ended up doing. The club selected Taylor Kemp from the Maryland Terrapins men's soccer program.

At the tail end of the winter transfer window, D.C. United announced they had sold midfielder Andy Najar to Belgian outfit Anderlecht. Najar was previously on a month-long loan to Anderlecht, with RSCA eventually exercising an option to purchase out his contract at the end of the loan. Najar became the first home grown player in Major League Soccer to be sold to an overseas club.

=== March–June ===
Ahead of the start of the regular season, Ben Olsen pressed that the club's goals were more than just qualifying for the playoffs, but qualifying for the CONCACAF Champions League, for the first time since the 2009–10 tournament. Several media outlets had the club returning to playoffs in preseason predictions, but in various spots due to offseason transactions and questions as to whether or not the 2013 squad was stronger than the 2012 squad. Many sought that the new ownership group was unwilling to spend on a higher-profile player.

The season began on the road, where the club suffered a late 2–0 loss at Houston. It was the second consecutive season in which D.C. United lost their opening match. The club form improved at home, where they picked up a win at home to Salt Lake and a draw on the road to New York.

After that though the club form dipped, as United went on a thirteen-match winless streak including 10 losses, seeing the team plummet to the bottom of the MLS table. The streak broke on June 22 when D.C. defeated San Jose Earthquakes 1–0 thanks to a penalty kick taken by Chris Pontius at the RFK Memorial, giving DC their second win after three months since their last. Surprisingly, though, United was enjoying much more success in U.S. Open Cup play. Despite struggling to a win over Richmond Kickers in a penalty kick shootout, the team won its next two Open Cup matches, with a pair of convincing 3–1 victories over MLS opposition that included the Philadelphia Union and the New England Revolution.

=== July–September ===
Despite breaking the long losing streak with the win over San Jose, the team quickly resumed their losing ways in league play. The team earned only one point over its next five games before finally winning again, with a 3–1 victory over the Montreal Impact, in early August. This win was only the team's third in league play, but it would be the last win in league play during 2013, as the team went winless over the final 12 games. However, just 4 days after the win over Montreal, United traveled to Chicago and gained a surprising 1–0 win in the semifinals of the 2013 U.S. Open Cup tournament.

=== Finish ===
On October 1, D.C. United won the 2013 U.S. Open Cup by defeating Real Salt Lake in the final, on a goal by midfielder Lewis Neal. The win was a massive surprise to most observers, given that DC was in the midst of a 12-game winless streak and had won only three regular-season games all year.

The team finished the year on Oct 27 tied for the fewest regular-season wins, 3, of any team in MLS history. They won more games against MLS opponents, 4, in the U.S. Open Cup than in the regular season, despite playing against MLS opponents in 34 regular-season games and only 4 Open Cup games. Notwithstanding that the team won its first title since last winning the Open cup in 2008, the 2013 D.C. United team set new standards of futility for MLS, as the team ended up with the fewest points per game by any MLS team in history, as well as scoring the fewest goals per game in league history.

== Competitions ==
Competition	Started round	Current position / round	Final position / round	First match	Last match
Major League Soccer	—	—		March 2, 2013	October 27, 2013
U.S. Open Cup	Third round	—		May 28, 2013	October 1, 2013
Walt Disney World Pro Soccer Classic	—	—		February 9, 2013	February 23, 2013

Source: Competitions

=== Preseason ===
==== Florida training camp ====
January 26	D.C. United	0–1	Columbus Crew	Bradenton, Florida
11:00 UTC-5	McDonald (yellow card) 24'	Report	Wahl (yellow card) 44'; Güvenışık 66'; Trapp (yellow card) 78'	Stadium: IMG Academy

February 1	D.C. United	1–1	Malmö FF	Bradenton, Florida
11:00 UTC-5	White (yellow card) 55'; Nane 78'	Report	Friberg 28'	Stadium: IMG Academy

February 20	D.C. United	1–1	Philadelphia Union	Deltona, Florida
18:00 UTC-5	Porter 69' (pen.)	Report	Hoffman 39'; Lahoud (yellow card) 58'; Anding (yellow card) 61'; Albright (yellow card) 75'	Stadium: Dewey O. Boster Sports Complex

==== Walt Disney World Pro Soccer Classic ====
Group stage

Team	Pld	W	L	D	GF	GA	GD	Pts
Montreal Impact	3	2	0	1	7	3	+4	7
Sporting Kansas City	3	2	1	0	4	2	+2	6
D.C. United	3	1	1	1	5	3	+2	4
Tampa Bay Rowdies	3	0	3	0	1	9	−8	0

February 9 1	D.C. United	4–0	Tampa Bay Rowdies	Lake Buena Vista, Florida
20:00 EDT	Pajoy (yellow card) 34'; 55', 58'; Kemp 65', 73'	Report		Stadium: Hess Field

February 13 2	Sporting Kansas City	2–0	D.C. United	Lake Buena Vista, Florida
18:00 EDT	Rosell (yellow card) 67'; Convey 74'; Saad 81'	Report		Stadium: Hess Field

February 16 3	Montreal Impact	1–1	D.C. United	Lake Buena Vista, Florida
13:00 EDT	Pisanu 16'; Arnaud (yellow card) 40'; Di Vaio (yellow card) 41'	Report	Riley (yellow card) 51'; Porter 85'	Stadium: Hess Field

===== Consolation match =====
February 16	Philadelphia Union	0–2	D.C. United	Lake Buena Vista, Florida
13:00 EDT	MacMath (yellow card) 36'; Farfan (yellow card) 74'; Le Toux (yellow card) 75'	Report	De Rosario 39' (pen.); Saragosa (yellow card) 58'; De Rosario (red card) 59'; Pajoy 67'	Stadium: Hess Field

=== Major League Soccer ===
==== Standings ====
Pos	Team	Pld	W	L	T	GF	GA	GD	Pts	Qualification
1	New York Red Bulls (S)	34	17	9	8	58	41	+17	59	CONCACAF Champions League
2	Sporting Kansas City (C)	34	17	10	7	47	30	+17	58	CONCACAF Champions League
3	Portland Timbers	34	14	5	15	54	33	+21	57	CONCACAF Champions League
4	Real Salt Lake	34	16	10	8	57	41	+16	56	
5	LA Galaxy	34	15	11	8	53	38	+15	53	
6	Seattle Sounders FC	34	15	12	7	42	42	0	52	
7	New England Revolution	34	14	11	9	49	38	+11	51	
8	Colorado Rapids	34	14	11	9	45	38	+7	51	
9	Houston Dynamo	34	14	11	9	41	41	0	51	
10	San Jose Earthquakes	34	14	11	9	35	42	−7	51	
11	Montreal Impact	34	14	13	7	50	49	+1	49	CONCACAF Champions League
12	Chicago Fire	34	14	13	7	47	52	−5	49	
13	Vancouver Whitecaps FC	34	13	12	9	53	45	+8	48	
14	Philadelphia Union	34	12	12	10	42	44	−2	46	
15	FC Dallas	34	11	12	11	48	52	−4	44	
16	Columbus Crew	34	12	17	5	42	46	−4	41	
17	Toronto FC	34	6	17	11	30	47	−17	29	
18	Chivas USA	34	6	20	8	30	67	−37	26	
19	D.C. United	34	3	24	7	22	59	−37	16	CONCACAF Champions League

Source: MLS
Rules for classification: 1) points; 2) head-to-head record; 3) goal difference; 4) number of goals scored
(C) MLS Cup Champion; (S) Supporters' Shield

==== Results summary ====
Overall								Home						Away					
Pld	W	D	L	GF	GA	GD	Pts	W	D	L	GF	GA	GD	W	D	L	GF	GA	GD
34	3	7	24	22	59	−37	16	3	4	12	17	34	−17	0	3	12	5	25	−20

Last updated: November 3, 2013.
Source: Match results

==== Match results ====
March 2 1	Houston Dynamo	2–0	D.C. United	Houston, Texas
20:00 UTC–5	Riley 80' (o.g.); Clark 89'	Report	Woolard (yellow card) 15'; Korb (yellow card) 40'	Stadium: BBVA Compass Stadium; Attendance: 20,019; Referee: Baldomero Toledo

March 9 2	D.C. United	1–0	Real Salt Lake	Washington, D.C.
19:00 UTC–5	Pajoy (yellow card) 28' (goal) 60'	Report	Beltran (yellow card) 31'; Mansally (yellow card) 63'; Beckerman (yellow card) 87'; Saborio (yellow card) 93+'	Stadium: RFK Stadium; Attendance: 17,072; Referee: Sorin Stoica

March 16 3 Atlantic Cup	New York Red Bulls	0–0	D.C. United	Harrison, New Jersey
12:30 UTC–5	Cahill (yellow card) 25'; Espindola (yellow card) 63'; Juninho (yellow card) 78'	Report		Stadium: Red Bull Arena; Attendance: 22,022; Referee: Mark Geiger

March 23 4	D.C. United	1–2	Columbus Crew	Washington, D.C.
15:30 UTC–5	Rafael 22'; Kitchen (yellow card) 56'	Report	Williams 15'; Gaven (yellow card) 51'; Speas 58'	Stadium: RFK Stadium; Attendance: 11,034; Referee: Allen Chapman

April 5 5	Sporting Kansas City	1–0	D.C. United	Kansas City, Kansas
20:30 UTC–5	Rosell (yellow card) 17'; Myers (yellow card) 75'; Bieler 89'	Report	Rafael (yellow card) 31'; Jakovic (yellow card) 48'; Hamid (yellow card) 72'	Stadium: Sporting Park; Attendance: 18,988; Referee: Armando Villarreal

April 13 6 Atlantic Cup	D.C. United	0–2	New York Red Bulls	Washington, D.C.
19:00 UTC–5		Report	Henry 29'; Olave 36'	Stadium: RFK Stadium; Attendance: 18,019; Referee: Jair Marrufo

April 21 7	D.C. United	2–3	Philadelphia Union	Washington, D.C.
17:00 UTC–5	Kitchen 17'; Pajoy 47'; Jakovic (yellow card) 66'	Report	McInerney 7', 26'; Casey 11' (yellow card) 92+'	Stadium: RFK Stadium; Attendance: 12,349; Referee: Hilario Grajeda

April 27 8	Columbus Crew	3–0	D.C. United	Columbus, Ohio
19:30 UTC–5	Oduro 15'; Viana (yellow card) 20'; Williams 26'; O'Rourke (yellow card) 45'; Higuain 47'; Arrieta (yellow card) 69'; Gláuber (yellow card) 93'	Report	Kitchen (yellow card) 45'; Woolard (yellow card) 48'; Pajoy (yellow card) 74'	Stadium: Crew Stadium; Attendance: 14,090; Referee: Sorin Stoica

May 8 9	D.C. United	0–4	Houston Dynamo	Washington, D.C.
19:00 UTC–5	Saragosa (yellow card) 77'	Report	Bruin 16', 78'; Barnes 28'; Driver (yellow card) 44' (goal) 88'; Ching (yellow card) 64'; Sarkodie (yellow card) 65'	Stadium: RFK Stadium; Attendance: 10,116; Referee: Jorge Gonzalez

May 11 10	FC Dallas	2–1	D.C. United	Frisco, Texas
20:30 UTC–5	Jackson 11'; Castillo (yellow card) 36'; Hassli (yellow card) 46'; Watson 77' (yellow card) 90+2'	Report	White (yellow card) 25'; De Rosario 44' (yellow card) 69'	Stadium: FC Dallas Stadium; Attendance: 14,322; Referee: Matthew Foerster

May 19 11	D.C. United	1–1	Sporting Kansas City	Washington, D.C.
17:00 UTC–5	Porter 65'; Kitchen (yellow card) 85'	Report	Olum (yellow card) 54'; White 60' (o.g.)	Stadium: RFK Stadium; Attendance: 13,612; Referee: Jair Marrufo

May 25 12	D.C. United	0–2	Portland Timbers	Washington, D.C.
19:00 UTC–5		Report	Wallace 21'; Nagbe 57'; Kah (yellow card) 64'; Valencia (yellow card) 88'	Stadium: RFK Stadium; Attendance: 14,131; Referee: Jose Carlos Rivero

June 2 13	Chicago Fire	2–0	D.C. United	Bridgeview, Illinois
17:00 UTC–5	DeLeon 9' (o.g.); Magee 85'; Duka (yellow card) 88'	Report		Stadium: Toyota Park; Attendance: 14,546; Referee: Juan Guzman

June 8 14	New England Revolution	0–0	D.C. United	Foxborough, Massachusetts
19:30 UTC–5	Toja (yellow card) 49'; Lee Nguyen (yellow card) 78'	Report	Chris Korb (yellow card) 72'; Ethan White (yellow card) 85'	Stadium: Gillette Stadium; Attendance: 14,163; Referee: Ted Unkel

June 15 15	D.C. United	1–2	Toronto FC	Washington, D.C.
19:00 UTC–5	De Rosario 19'; Woolard (yellow card) 45'	Report	Earnshaw 30'; Caldwell (yellow card) 49'; Woolard 41' (o.g.); Russell (yellow card) 88'	Stadium: RFK Stadium; Attendance: 13,846; Referee: Hilario Grajeda

June 22 16	D.C. United	1–0	San Jose Earthquakes	Washington, D.C.
19:00 UTC–5	Porter (yellow card) 2'; Pontius 11' (pen.); Thorrington (yellow card) 29'	Report	Hernandez (yellow card) 36'	Stadium: RFK Stadium; Attendance: 13,149; Referee: Jair Marrufo

June 29 17	D.C. United	0–1	Vancouver Whitecaps FC	Washington, D.C.
19:00 UTC–5	Hamid (yellow card) 94'	Report	Sanvezzo 48' (pen.); Koffie (yellow card) 70'	Stadium: RFK Stadium; Attendance: 13,122; Referee: Matthew Foerster

July 3 18	Seattle Sounders FC	2–0	D.C. United	Seattle, Washington
22:00 UTC–5	Martins 19', 91'	Report		Stadium: CenturyLink Field; Attendance: 39,180; Referee: Allen Chapman

July 7 19	Colorado Rapids	0–0	D.C. United	Commerce City, Colorado
21:30 UTC–5		Report		Stadium: Dick's Sporting Goods Park; Attendance: 14,739; Referee: Drew Fischer

July 20 20	Chicago Fire	4–1	D.C. United	Bridgeview, Illinois
20:30 UTC–5	Rolfe 2', 45' (yellow card) 81'; Lindpere 11'; Magee 56' (pen.); Berry (yellow card) 90'	Report	Silva 58'; Porter (yellow card) 70'; Thorrington (yellow card) 90'	Stadium: Toyota Park; Attendance: 17,190; Referee: Fotis Bazakos

July 27 21	D.C. United	1–2	New England Revolution	Washington, D.C.
19:00 UTC–5	Silva 8'; Jeffrey (yellow card) 35'	Report	Imbongo 54'; Fagúndez 63'	Stadium: RFK Stadium; Attendance: 14,122; Referee: David Gantar

August 3 22	D.C. United	3–1	Montreal Impact	Washington, D.C.
19:00 UTC–5	Silva 19'; Kitchen (yellow card) 29'; Korb (yellow card) 48'; Porter (yellow card) 65'; Doyle 68'; Jeffrey (yellow card) 87' (goal) 90'	Report	Brovsky 52'; Romero (yellow card) 62'	Stadium: RFK Stadium; Attendance: 12,354; Referee: Allen Chapman

August 10 23	Philadelphia Union	2–0	D.C. United	Chester, Pennsylvania
20:00 UTC–5	Casey 35', 75'	Report		Stadium: PPL Park; Attendance: 18,652; Referee: Hilario Grajeda

August 17 24	Montreal Impact	2–1	D.C. United	Montreal, Quebec
TBD UTC–5	Di Vaio 43', 83' (yellow card) 84'; Romero (yellow card) 47'; Bernier (yellow card) 90+1'	Report	De Rosario (yellow card) 39'; Thorrington (yellow card) 29'; Riley (yellow card) 75'; Doyle 81'	Stadium: Stade Saputo; Attendance: 20,801; Referee: Ismail Elfath

August 24 25	D.C. United	1–1	Toronto FC	Washington, D.C.
19:00 UTC–5	De Rosario 10'; Korb (yellow card) 83'	Report	Convey 60'	Stadium: RFK Stadium; Attendance: 13,972; Referee: Chris Penso

August 31 26 Atlantic Cup	New York Red Bulls	2–1	D.C. United	Harrison, New Jersey
20:00 UTC–5	Sam 8'; Cahill 38'; Steele (yellow card) 61'; Sekagya (red card) 72'; Henry (yellow card) 77'	Report	DeLeon 36'; Neal (yellow card) 80'; Silva (yellow card) 80'	Stadium: Red Bull Arena; Attendance: 17,372; Referee: Juan Guzman

September 8 27	Chivas USA	1–0	D.C. United	Carson, California
21:00 UTC–5	Bocanegra (yellow card) 45+3'; Torres 51'	Report		Stadium: The Home Depot Center; Attendance: 7,781; Referee: Mark Kadlecik

September 15 28	D.C. United	2–2	Los Angeles Galaxy	Washington, D.C.
17:00 UTC–5	Pontius 39'; Porter 84'	Report	Keane 7'; Stephens 81'	Stadium: RFK Stadium; Attendance: 16,233; Referee: Drew Fischer

September 21 29	New England Revolution	2–1	D.C. United	Foxborough, Massachusetts
19:30 UTC–5	Gonçalves (yellow card) 28'; Fagúndez 58'; Nguyen 83'; Barrett (yellow card) 89'	Report	Jaković (yellow card) 6'; Caldwell 11' (o.g.); Korb (yellow card) 33'; DeLeon (yellow card) 88'	Stadium: Gillette Stadium; Attendance: 19,187; Referee: Carlos Rivera

September 28 30	Toronto FC	4–1	D.C. United	Toronto, Ontario
17:00 UTC–5	Russell 25'; Dike (yellow card) 45' (goal) 67'; Convey (yellow card) 62'; Shanosky 71' (o.g.); Rey 87'	Report	Jeffrey 15'; Martin (yellow card) 37'; Saragosa (yellow card) 68'	Stadium: BMO Field; Attendance: 15,879; Referee: Ted Unkel

October 4 31	D.C. United	0–3	Chicago Fire	Washington, D.C.
20:00 UTC–5		Report	Larentowicz 24'; Soumaré 26'; Amarikwa 89'	Stadium: RFK Stadium; Attendance: 13,949; Referee: Ricardo Salazar

October 12 32	D.C. United	1–1	Philadelphia Union	Washington, D.C.
19:00 UTC–5	DeLeon 36'	Report	McInerney 90'	Stadium: RFK Stadium; Attendance: 11,213; Referee: Edvin Jurisevic

October 18 33	Sporting Kansas City	1–0	D.C. United	Kansas City, Kansas
20:00 UTC–5	Dwyer 7'	Report		Stadium: Sporting Park; Attendance: 18,932; Referee: Chris Penso

October 27 34	D.C. United	1–2	Houston Dynamo	Washington, D.C.
13:30 UTC–5	Porter 27'	TV: NBC	Garcia 11'; Barnes 39'	Stadium: RFK Stadium; Attendance: 13,731; Referee: Armando Villarreal

=== U.S. Open Cup ===
May 28 Third round	Richmond Kickers (Virginia)	0–0 (a.e.t.) (2–4 p)	(Washington, D.C.) D.C. United	Richmond, Virginia
20:00 EDT	Yeisley (yellow card) 57'; Delicâte (yellow card) 73'; Dykstra (yellow card) 120'	Report	Pontius (yellow card) 82'; Korb (yellow card) 90' (yellow-red card) 113'; Ruiz (red card) 117'	Stadium: Richmond City Stadium; Attendance: 4,752; Referee: Eric Weisbrod
	Penalties
	Görres (penalty missed); Ngwenya (penalty missed); Vercollone (penalty scored); Robinson (penalty scored)		(penalty scored) De Rosario; (penalty scored) Kitchen; (penalty scored) DeLeon; (penalty scored) Riley

June 12 Fourth round	D.C. United (Washington, D.C.)	3–1	(Pennsylvania) Philadelphia Union	Boyds, Maryland
20:00 EDT	De Rosario 24', 75', 85'	Report	Okugo (yellow card) 46'; Fernandes (yellow card) 56'; McInerney 76'	Stadium: Maryland SoccerPlex; Attendance: 2,325; Referee: Kevin Terry

June 26 Quarterfinals	D.C. United (Washington, D.C.)	3–1	(Massachusetts) New England Revolution	Boyds, Maryland
20:00 EDT	Pontius 45'; Riley (yellow card) 52'; De Rosario 69'; Pajoy 87' (pen.)	Report	Dorman (yellow card) 47'; Toja 52'; Imbongo (yellow card) 58'	Stadium: Maryland SoccerPlex; Attendance: 2,918; Referee: Edwin Jurisevic

August 7 Semifinals	Chicago Fire (Illinois)	0–2	(Washington, D.C.) D.C. United	Bridgeview, Illinois
20:30 EDT		Report	De Rosario 44'; DeLeon 48'	Stadium: Toyota Park; Referee: Jair Marrufo

October 1 Final	Real Salt Lake (Utah)	0–1	(Washington, D.C.) D.C. United	Sandy, Utah
21:00 EDT	Beckerman (yellow card) 45+2'; Rimando (yellow card) 90'	Report	Riley (yellow card) 21'; Neal 45'; DeLeon (yellow card) 58'; Korb (yellow card) 80'	Stadium: Rio Tinto Stadium; Attendance: 20,507; Referee: Juan Guzman

=== Friendlies ===
July 12	D.C. United (United States)	1–1	(Mexico) Guadalajara	Washington, D.C.
20:00 EDT	Ruiz 73'	Report	Coronado 90'	Stadium: RFK Stadium

=== 2013 Indonesian Tour ===
December 6	Persib (Indonesia)	2–1	(United States) D.C. United	Bandung
5:30 EST	Konaté 38'; Firman 70'		Seaton 20'	Stadium: Jalak Harupat Soreang Stadium

December 8	Arema (Indonesia)	2–1	(United States) D.C. United	Malang
6:00 EST				Stadium: Kanjuruhan Stadium

== Statistics ==
=== Appearances and goals ===
No.	Pos	Nat	Player	Total		MLS		MLS Cup Playoffs		U.S. Open Cup	
No.	Pos	Nat	Player	Apps	Goals	Apps	Goals	Apps	Goals	Apps	Goals
2	DF	(United States) USA	James Riley	26	0	19+2	0	0+0	0	5+0	0
3	DF	(United States) USA	Dennis Iapichino	6	0	4+2	0	0+0	0	0+0	0
4	DF	(United States) USA	Brandon McDonald	13	0	11+1	0	0+0	0	0+1	0
5	DF	(Canada) CAN	Dejan Jaković	20	0	17+1	0	0+0	0	2+0	0
6	MF	(Indonesia) IDN	Syamsir Alam (on loan from Visé)	0	0	0+0	0	0+0	0	0+0	0
7	FW	(Canada) CAN	Dwayne De Rosario	28	8	17+6	3	0+0	0	5+0	5
8	MF	(United States) USA	John Thorrington	18	0	12+2	0	0+0	0	4+0	0
11	MF	(Brazil) BRA	Marcelo Saragosa	8	0	4+4	0	0+0	0	0+0	0
12	MF	(United States) USA	Luis Silva	15	3	13+0	3	0+0	0	2+0	0
13	FW	(United States) USA	Chris Pontius	26	3	19+3	2	0+0	0	3+1	1
15	DF	(United States) USA	Ethan White	16	0	13+1	0	0+0	0	2+0	0
16	FW	(United States) USA	Casey Townsend (on loan to Richmond Kickers)	11	0	3+6	0	0+0	0	1+1	0
17	MF	(United States) USA	Conor Shanosky	7	0	4+1	0	0+0	0	2+0	0
18	MF	(United States) USA	Nick DeLeon	30	3	23+2	2	0+0	0	5+0	1
19	MF	(Canada) CAN	Kyle Porter	28	3	18+7	3	0+0	0	3+0	0
20	FW	(Guatemala) GUA	Carlos Ruiz	14	0	5+8	0	0+0	0	0+1	0
21	DF	(United States) USA	Daniel Woolard	31	0	27+0	0	0+0	0	4+0	0
22	DF	(United States) USA	Chris Korb	34	0	30+0	0	0+0	0	4+0	0
23	MF	(United States) USA	Perry Kitchen	36	1	31+0	1	0+0	0	5+0	0
24	MF	(England) ENG	Lewis Neal	9	1	5+3	0	0+0	0	1+0	1
25	MF	(United States) USA	Jared Jeffrey	10	2	10+0	2	0+0	0	0+0	0
26	FW	(Colombia) COL	Lionard Pajoy	23	3	12+8	2	0+0	0	1+2	1
27	MF	(The Gambia) GAM	Sainey Nyassi	16	0	7+7	0	0+0	0	0+2	0
28	GK	(United States) USA	Bill Hamid	26	0	25+0	0	0+0	0	1+0	0
29	FW	(Jamaica) JAM	Michael Seaton	3	0	1+2	0	0+0	0	0+0	0
30	FW	(United States) USA	Conor Doyle (on loan from Derby County)	14	2	8+5	2	0+0	0	1+0	0
31	GK	(United States) USA	Joe Willis	13	0	9+0	0	0+0	0	4+0	0
32	MF	(United States) USA	Collin Martin	7	0	4+3	0	0+0	0	0+0	0
33	DF	(United States) USA	Taylor Kemp	10	0	7+1	0	0+0	0	1+1	0
50	GK	(United States) USA	Andrew Dykstra (on loan to Richmond Kickers)	0	0	0+0	0	0+0	0	0+0	0
Players who left the club during the 2013 season
3	DF	(Ghana) GHA	Robbie Russell	1	0	0+1	0	0+0	0	0+0	0
9	FW	(Brazil) BRA	Rafael (on loan from Bahia)	7	1	4+3	1	0+0	0	0+0	0
12	FW	(Brazil) BRA	Raphael Augusto (on loan from Fluminense)	8	0	5+2	0	0+0	0	1+0	0
25	MF	(Panama) PAN	Marcos Sánchez	9	0	6+3	0	0+0	0	0+0	0
25	MF	(United States) USA	Lance Rozeboom	0	0	0+0	0	0+0	0	0+0	0
25	DF	(Switzerland) SUI	Alain Rochat	5	0	4+1	0	0+0	0	0+0	0
—	DF	(United States) USA	Evan Raynr	0	0	0+0	0	0+0	0	0+0	0

Statistics current as of November 3, 2013
Source: D.C. United Season Statistics

=== Goalkeeping statistics ===
No.	Nat	Player	Total				MLS				MLS Cup Playoffs				U.S. Open Cup			
No.	Nat	Player	MIN	GA	GAA	SV	MIN	GA	GAA	SV	MIN	GA	GAA	SV	MIN	GA	GAA	SV
28	(United States)	Bill Hamid	2250	39	1.54	76	2250	39	1.54	76	0	0	—	0	0	0	—	0
31	(United States)	Joe Willis	810	20	2.22	28	810	20	2.22	28	0	0	—	0	0	0	—	0
50	(United States)	Andrew Dykstra	0	0	—	0	0	0	—	0	0	0	—	0	0	0	—	0
		TOTALS	3060	59	3.76	104	3060	59	3.76	104	0	0	—	0	0	0	—	0

Statistics current as of November 3, 2013
Source: D.C. United Season Goalkeeping Statistics

=== Top scorers ===
Rank	Pos	No.	Player	MLS	MLS Cup Playoffs	U.S. Open Cup	Total
1	MF	7	Dwayne De Rosario	3	0	5	8
2	FW	26	Lionard Pajoy	2	0	1	3
2	MF	12	Luis Silva	3	0	0	3
2	FW	13	Chris Pontius	2	0	1	3
2	MF	19	Kyle Porter	3	0	0	3
6	FW	30	Conor Doyle	2	0	0	2
6	MF	25	Jared Jeffrey	2	0	0	2
6	MF	18	Nick DeLeon	2	0	0	2
9	FW	9	Rafael	1	0	0	1
9	MF	25	Perry Kitchen	1	0	0	1
9	MF	24	Lewis Neal	0	0	1	1

=== Top assists ===
Rank	Pos	No.	Player	MLS	MLS Cup Playoffs	U.S. Open Cup	Total
1	MF	25	Perry Kitchen	3	0	0	3
1	FW	13	Chris Pontius	2	0	1	3
3	MF	12	Luis Silva	1	0	1	2
3	FW	7	Dwayne De Rosario	2	0	0	2
5	DF	4	Brandon McDonald	1	0	0	1
5	DF	21	Daniel Woolard	1	0	0	1
5	MF	18	Nick DeLeon	1	0	0	1
5	MF	19	Kyle Porter	1	0	0	1
5	FW	26	Lionard Pajoy	0	0	1	1
5	MF	8	John Thorrington	1	0	0	1
5	DF	2	James Riley	1	0	0	1
5	MF	32	Collin Martin	1	0	0	1
5	FW	30	Conor Doyle	1	0	0	1
5	MF	24	Lewis Neal	1	0	0	1

=== Disciplinary record ===
Number	Nation	Position	Name	MLS		MLS Cup Playoffs		U.S. Open Cup		Total	
Number	Nation	Position	Name	Booked	Sent off (straight red)	Booked	Sent off (straight red)	Booked	Sent off (straight red)	Booked	Sent off (straight red)
22	(United States)	DF	Chris Korb	5	0	0	0	3	0	8	0
23	(United States)	MF	Perry Kitchen	6	0	0	0	0	0	6	0
2	(United States)	DF	James Riley	4	0	0	0	2	0	6	0
21	(United States)	DF	Daniel Woolard	3	0	0	0	0	0	3	0
19	(Canada)	MF	Kyle Porter	3	0	0	0	0	0	3	0
8	(United States)	MF	John Thorrington	3	0	0	0	0	0	3	0
5	(Canada)	DF	Dejan Jaković	3	0	0	0	0	0	3	0
25	(United States)	MF	Jared Jeffrey	3	0	0	0	0	0	3	0
18	(United States)	MF	Nick DeLeon	2	0	0	0	1	0	3	0
15	(United States)	DF	Ethan White	2	0	0	0	0	0	2	0
26	(Colombia)	FW	Lionard Pajoy	2	0	0	0	0	0	2	0
28	(United States)	GK	Bill Hamid	2	0	0	0	0	0	2	0
7	(Canada)	FW	Dwayne De Rosario	2	0	0	0	0	0	2	0
11	(Brazil)	MF	Marcelo Saragosa	2	0	0	0	0	0	2	0
20	(Guatemala)	FW	Carlos Ruiz	0	0	0	0	0	1	0	1
9	(Brazil)	FW	Rafael	1	0	0	0	0	0	1	0
25	(Switzerland)	DF	Alain Rochat	1	0	0	0	0	0	1	0
16	(United States)	MF	Casey Townsend	1	0	0	0	0	0	1	0
13	(United States)	FW	Chris Pontius	0	0	0	0	1	0	1	0
24	(England)	MF	Lewis Neal	1	0	0	0	0	0	1	0
12	(United States)	MF	Luis Silva	1	0	0	0	0	0	1	0
32	(United States)	MF	Collin Martin	1	0	0	0	0	0	1	0
27	(The Gambia)	MF	Sainey Nyassi	1	0	0	0	0	0	1	0
3	(United States)	DF	Dennis Iapichino	1	0	0	0	0	0	1	0

Statistics current as of November 3, 2013
Source: D.C. United Season Card Statistics

== Transfers ==
=== In ===
No.	Pos.	Player	Transferred from	Fee/notes	Date	Source
8	MF	(United States) John Thorrington	(Canada) Vancouver Whitecaps FC	Selected in the 2012 MLS Re-Entry Draft	December 14, 2012	
29	FW	(Jamaica) Michael Seaton	The Academy	Signed on to the first team as a HGP	January 14, 2013	
33	DF	(United States) Taylor Kemp	(United States) Maryland Terrapins	Selected in the 2013 MLS SuperDraft	January 17, 2013	
	MF	(United States) Evan Raynr	(United States) UCLA Bruins	Selected in the 2013 MLS Supplemental Draft	January 22, 2013	
16	FW	(United States) Casey Townsend	(United States) Chivas USA	Traded for 2014 MLS SuperDraft second round pick	January 25, 2013	
2	DF	(United States) James Riley	(United States) Chivas USA	Traded for 2015 MLS SuperDraft second round pick	February 15, 2013	
20	FW	(Guatemala) Carlos Ruiz	(Guatemala) Municipal	Acquired through MLS Allocation	February 20, 2013	
19	FW	(Canada) Kyle Porter	(Canada) FC Edmonton	Undisclosed	February 23, 2013	
27	MF	(The Gambia) Sainey Nyassi	(United States) New England Revolution	Free	May 27, 2013	
25	MF	(Switzerland) Alain Rochat	(Canada) Vancouver Whitecaps FC	Traded for 2015 MLS SuperDraft second round pick	June 6, 2013	
25	MF	(United States) Jared Jeffrey	(Germany) Mainz 05	Waiver draft	July 3, 2013	
12	MF	(United States) Luis Silva	(Canada) Toronto FC	Traded for allocation money	July 9, 2013	
32	MF	(United States) Collin Martin	(United States) The Academy	Signed on to the first team as a HGP	July 9, 2013	
3	DF	(Switzerland) Dennis Iapichino	(Canada) Montreal Impact	Free	August 15, 2013	

=== Out ===
No.	Pos.	Player	Transferred to	Fee/notes	Date	Source
8	MF	(Montenegro) Branko Bošković	(Austria) Rapid Wien	Mutual agreement	November 21, 2012	
6	DF	(United States) Mike Chabala	(United States) Houston Dynamo	Option declined	December 3, 2012	
19	DF	(Argentina) Emiliano Dudar	(Switzerland) Chiasso	Option declined	December 3, 2012	
20	MF	(United States) Stephen King	Retired	Option declined	December 3, 2012	
24	FW	(Brazil) Maicon Santos	(United States) Chicago Fire	Option declined; selected in 2012 MLS Re-Entry Draft	December 3, 2012	
14	MF	(Honduras) Andy Najar	(Belgium) Anderlecht	Undisclosed fee, purchased contract from loan	January 30, 2013	
9	FW	(Albania) Hamdi Salihi	(China) Jiangsu Sainty	Undisclosed	February 3, 2013	
55	DF	(Denmark) Jan Frederiksen	(Denmark) Vejle Kolding	Released from training camp	February 20, 2013	
40	MF	(Cameroon) Joseph Nane	(United States) New York Cosmos	Released from training camp	February 20, 2013	
37	MF	(Jamaica) Shavar Thomas	(United States) Fort Lauderdale Strikers	Released from training camp	February 20, 2013	
25	MF	(United States) Lance Rozeboom	(United States) Rochester Rhinos	Released	February 27, 2013	
25	DF	(Switzerland) Alain Rochat	(Switzerland) BSC Young Boys	$500K	July 9, 2013	

=== Loan in ===
No.	Pos.	Player	Loaned from	Start	End	Source
9	FW	(Brazil) Rafael	(Brazil) Bahia	January 9, 2013	December 31, 2013	
6	MF	(Indonesia) Syamsir Alam	(Belgium) Visé	January 25, 2013	June 30, 2013	
25	MF	(Panama) Marcos Sánchez	(Panama) Tauro	February 26, 2013	May 30, 2013	
30	FW	(United States) Conor Doyle	(England) Derby County	July 18, 2013	December 1, 2013	

=== Loan out ===
No.	Pos.	Player	Loaned to	Start	End	Source
14	MF	(Honduras) Andy Najar	(Belgium) Anderlecht	January 7, 2013	January 31, 2013	
16	FW	(United States) Casey Townsend	(United States) Richmond Kickers	March 19, 2013	September 1, 2013	
17	MF	(United States) Conor Shanosky	(United States) Richmond Kickers	March 19, 2013	September 1, 2013	
29	FW	(Jamaica) Michael Seaton	(United States) Richmond Kickers	March 19, 2013	September 1, 2013	
33	DF	(United States) Taylor Kemp	(United States) Richmond Kickers	March 19, 2013	September 1, 2013	

== See also ==
- D.C. United
- List of D.C. United seasons
- 2013 Major League Soccer season
- 2013 MLS Cup Playoffs
- 2013 U.S. Open Cup
- 2013 in American soccer
