= List of Major League Soccer transfers 2013 =

The following is a list of transfers for the 2013 Major League Soccer season. Vancouver Whitecaps FC made the first move by dealing Dane Richards to Football League side Burnley during the 2012 season, but the transfer did not take effect until January 1, 2013. The rest of the moves will be made from the 2012–2013 off-season all the way through the roster freeze in September 2013.

== Transfers ==
Date	Name	Moving from	Moving to	Mode of Transfer
August 26, 2012	(Jamaica) Dane Richards	Vancouver Whitecaps FC	(England) Burnley	Undisclosed
November 15, 2012	(Wales) Andy Dorman	(England) Crystal Palace	New England Revolution	Undisclosed
November 19, 2012	(Mali) Kalifa Cissé	(England) Bristol City	New England Revolution	Free
November 19, 2012	(United States) Cole Grossman	Columbus Crew	Real Salt Lake	Waiver Draft
December 3, 2012	(United States) Jeff Attinella	(United States) Tampa Bay Rowdies	Real Salt Lake	Free
December 3, 2012	(United States) Justin Braun	Real Salt Lake	Toronto FC	Trade
December 3, 2012	(United States) Eric Brunner	Portland Timbers	Houston Dynamo	Trade
December 3, 2012	(Argentina) Fabián Espíndola	Real Salt Lake	New York Red Bulls	Trade
December 3, 2012	(United States) Michael Harrington	Sporting Kansas City	Portland Timbers	Trade
December 3, 2012	(Saint Kitts and Nevis) Atiba Harris	Vancouver Whitecaps FC	Colorado Rapids	Trade
December 3, 2012	(Canada) Will Johnson	Real Salt Lake	Portland Timbers	Trade
December 3, 2012	(Japan) Kosuke Kimura	Portland Timbers	New York Red Bulls	Trade
December 3, 2012	(United States) Aaron Maund	Toronto FC	Real Salt Lake	Trade
December 3, 2012	(Colombia) Jámison Olave	Real Salt Lake	New York Red Bulls	Trade
December 4, 2012	(United States) Zach Pfeffer	Philadelphia Union	(Germany) 1899 Hoffenheim	Loan
December 5, 2012	(United States) Josh Gardner	Montreal Impact	Sporting Kansas City	Trade
December 6, 2012	(France) Sébastien Le Toux	New York Red Bulls	Philadelphia Union	Trade
December 6, 2012	(Costa Rica) Josué Martínez	Philadelphia Union	New York Red Bulls	Trade
December 7, 2012	(United States) Jeff Parke	Seattle Sounders FC	Philadelphia Union	Trade
December 7, 2012	(Brazil) Maicon Santos	D.C. United	Chicago Fire	Re-Entry Draft
December 10, 2012	(France) Peter Luccin	Unattached	FC Dallas	Free
December 11, 2012	(United States) Benny Feilhaber	New England Revolution	Sporting Kansas City	Trade
December 12, 2012	(United States) Joe Bendik	Portland Timbers	Toronto FC	Trade
December 12, 2012	(Jamaica) Ryan Johnson	Toronto FC	Portland Timbers	Trade
December 12, 2012	(Serbia) Miloš Kocić	Toronto FC	Portland Timbers	Trade
December 12, 2012	(United States) Ike Opara	San Jose Earthquakes	Sporting Kansas City	Trade
December 13, 2012	(Cameroon) Yann Songo'o	(Spain) Pobla Mafumet	Sporting Kansas City	Undisclosed
December 14, 2012	(United States) Eric Avila	Toronto FC	Colorado Rapids	Re-Entry Draft
December 14, 2012	(United States) Chad Barrett	Los Angeles Galaxy	New England Revolution	Re-Entry Draft
December 14, 2012	(United States) Edson Buddle	Los Angeles Galaxy	Colorado Rapids	Trade
December 14, 2012	(United States) Danny Califf	Chivas USA	Toronto FC	Re-Entry Draft
December 14, 2012	(United States) Conor Casey	Colorado Rapids	Philadelphia Union	Re-Entry Draft
December 14, 2012	(United States) Colin Clark	Houston Dynamo	Los Angeles Galaxy	Re-Entry Draft
December 14, 2012	(United States) Hunter Freeman	Colorado Rapids	New England Revolution	Re-Entry Draft
December 14, 2012	(United States) Dan Gargan	Chicago Fire	San Jose Earthquakes	Re-Entry Draft
December 14, 2012	(United States) Ty Harden	Toronto FC	San Jose Earthquakes	Re-Entry Draft
December 14, 2012	(United States) William Hesmer	Columbus Crew	Los Angeles Galaxy	Re-Entry Draft
December 14, 2012	(United States) Bryan Jordan	Los Angeles Galaxy	San Jose Earthquakes	Re-Entry Draft
December 14, 2012	(United States) Stephen Keel	New York Red Bulls	FC Dallas	Re-Entry Draft
December 14, 2012	(Jamaica) Lovel Palmer	Portland Timbers	Real Salt Lake	Re-Entry Draft
December 14, 2012	(Brazil) Paulo Jr.	Real Salt Lake	Vancouver Whitecaps FC	Re-Entry Draft
December 14, 2012	(United States) John Thorrington	Vancouver Whitecaps FC	D.C. United	Re-Entry Draft
December 17, 2012	(Brazil) Juninho	(Brazil) Vasco da Gama	New York Red Bulls	Undisclosed
December 18, 2012	(Argentina) Claudio Bieler	(Ecuador) LDU Quito	Sporting Kansas City	Undisclosed
December 18, 2012	(Honduras) Roger Espinoza	Sporting Kansas City	(England) Wigan Athletic	Free
December 18, 2012	(United States) Mobi Fehr	Unattached	Portland Timbers	Lottery
December 18, 2012	(Brazil) Pipico	(Brazil) Vasco da Gama	FC Dallas	Undisclosed
December 20, 2012	(United States) Gale Agbossoumonde	Unattached	Toronto FC	Lottery
December 23, 2012	(Jamaica) Omar Cummings	Colorado Rapids	Houston Dynamo	Trade
December 23, 2012	(United States) Nathan Sturgis	Houston Dynamo	Colorado Rapids	Trade
December 29, 2012	(England) Ryan Smith	Chivas USA	(Greece) Skoda Xanthi	Undisclosed
December 31, 2012	(Italy) Carlo Cudicini	(England) Tottenham Hotspur	Los Angeles Galaxy	Free
January 3, 2013	(Ecuador) Diego Calderón	(Ecuador) LDU Quito	Colorado Rapids	Undisclosed
January 3, 2013	(Portugal) José Gonçalves	(Switzerland) FC Sion	New England Revolution	Loan
January 3, 2013	(United States) Tyson Wahl	Unattached	Columbus Crew	Free
January 4, 2013	(Estonia) Joel Lindpere	New York Red Bulls	Chicago Fire	Trade
January 4, 2013	(Italy) Andrea Pisanu	(Italy) Bologna	Montreal Impact	Loan
January 7, 2013	(Honduras) Andy Najar	D.C. United	(Belgium) Anderlecht	Loan
January 9, 2013	(Brazil) Rafael	(Brazil) Bahia	D.C. United	Loan
January 10, 2013	(Peru) Raúl Fernández	(France) Nice	FC Dallas	Undisclosed
January 10, 2013	(Argentina) Diego Valeri	(Argentina) Lanús	Portland Timbers	Loan
January 11, 2013	(United States) Brad Rusin	(Denmark) HB Køge	Vancouver Whitecaps FC	Undisclosed
January 14, 2013	(Colombia) Carlos Valdés	Philadelphia Union	(Colombia) Independiente Santa Fe	Loan
January 15, 2013	(Brazil) Júlio César	Unattached	Toronto FC	Free
January 16, 2013	(United States) Robbie Findley	Unattached	Real Salt Lake	Free
January 16, 2013	(Brazil) Juninho	(Brazil) São Paulo	Los Angeles Galaxy	Undisclosed
January 16, 2013	(United States) Jeff Larentowicz	Colorado Rapids	Chicago Fire	Trade
January 17, 2013	(United States) Mike Fucito	Portland Timbers	San Jose Earthquakes	Trade
January 17, 2013	(Chile) Kevin Harbottle	(Chile) Universidad Católica	Colorado Rapids	Undisclosed
January 19, 2013	(Trinidad and Tobago) Damani Richards	Unattached	Philadelphia Union	Free
January 19, 2013	(United States) Aaron Wheeler	(Finland) KooTeePee	Philadelphia Union	Undisclosed
January 21, 2013	(United States) Ryan Miller	(Sweden) Halmstad	Portland Timbers	Undisclosed
January 21, 2013	(Colombia) Fredy Montero	Seattle Sounders FC	(Colombia) Millonarios	Loan
January 21, 2013	(Colombia) José Adolfo Valencia	(Colombia) Santa Fe	Portland Timbers	Undisclosed
January 22, 2013	(United States) Eric Avila	Colorado Rapids	Chivas USA	Trade
January 22, 2013	(Brazil) Gláuber	(Romania) Rapid București	Columbus Crew	Undisclosed
January 22, 2013	(United States) Nick LaBrocca	Chivas USA	Colorado Rapids	Trade
January 23, 2013	(United States) Tom Heinemann	Unattached	Vancouver Whitecaps FC	Free
January 23, 2013	(United States) Corey Hertzog	Unattached	Vancouver Whitecaps FC	Free
January 24, 2013	(United States) Alex Mendoza	(Mexico) UNAM Pumas	Philadelphia Union	Undisclosed
January 25, 2013	(Indonesia) Syamsir Alam	(Belgium) Visé	D.C. United	Loan
January 25, 2013	(Cameroon) Charles Eloundou	(Cameroon) AS Fortuna de Mfou	Colorado Rapids	Loan via Lottery
January 25, 2013	(Uruguay) Álvaro Fernández	Chicago Fire	(Qatar) Al Rayyan	Loan
January 25, 2013	(United States) Matt Horth	(United States) Atlanta Silverbacks	New England Revolution	Free
January 25, 2013	(United States) Casey Townsend	Chivas USA	D.C. United	Trade
January 26, 2013	(Uruguay) Federico Puppo	Chicago Fire	(Ecuador) LDU Quito	Loan
January 27, 2013	(United States) Lamar Neagle	Montreal Impact	Seattle Sounders FC	Trade
January 28, 2013	(Japan) Daigo Kobayashi	(Japan) Shimizu S-Pulse	Vancouver Whitecaps FC	Undisclosed
January 28, 2013	(Uruguay) Agustín Viana	(Uruguay) Bella Vista	Columbus Crew	Undisclosed
January 30, 2013	(Sierra Leone) Kei Kamara	Sporting Kansas City	(England) Norwich City	Loan
January 30, 2013	(Honduras) Andy Najar	D.C. United	(Belgium) Anderlecht	Undisclosed
January 30, 2013	(Ecuador) Joao Plata	Toronto FC	Real Salt Lake	Trade
January 31, 2013	(United States) Brendan King	Unattached	Chicago Fire	Free
January 31, 2013	(United States) Brek Shea	FC Dallas	(England) Stoke City	Undisclosed
February 1, 2013	(United States) Dilly Duka	Columbus Crew	Chicago Fire	Trade
February 1, 2013	(Ghana) Dominic Oduro	Chicago Fire	Columbus Crew	Trade
February 4, 2013	(United States) Kenny Cooper	New York Red Bulls	FC Dallas	Trade
February 4, 2013	(France) Eric Hassli	Toronto FC	FC Dallas	Trade
February 7, 2013	(Argentina) Andrés Romero	(Brazil) Tombense	Montreal Impact	Loan
February 8, 2013	(Spain) Ruben Bover	(England) Charlton Athletic	New York Red Bulls	Undisclosed
February 8, 2013	(Argentina) Matías Sánchez	(Argentina) Estudiantes	Columbus Crew	Undisclosed
February 11, 2013	(United States) Eric Alexander	Portland Timbers	New York Red Bulls	Trade
February 11, 2013	(United States) Bilal Duckett	(United States) Harrisburg City Islanders	New England Revolution	Free
February 13, 2013	(United States) Ben Zemanski	Chivas USA	Portland Timbers	Trade
February 14, 2013	(United States) Carlos Borja	(United States) Los Angeles Blues	Chivas USA	Free
February 14, 2013	(El Salvador) Steve Purdy	Unattached	Chivas USA	Free
February 14, 2013	(United States) James Riley	Chivas USA	D.C. United	Trade
February 19, 2013	(Grenada) Shalrie Joseph	Chivas USA	Seattle Sounders FC	Trade
February 19, 2013	(Honduras) Johnny Leverón	(Honduras) Motagua	Vancouver Whitecaps FC	Undisclosed
February 19, 2013	(Brazil) Michel	(Greece) Aris	FC Dallas	Undisclosed
February 19, 2013	(France) Mikaël Silvestre	Unattached	Portland Timbers	Free
February 19, 2013	(Jamaica) Je-Vaughn Watson	Houston Dynamo	FC Dallas	Trade
February 20, 2013	(England) Andrew Driver	(Scotland) Heart of Midlothian	Houston Dynamo	Loan
February 20, 2013	(Guatemala) Carlos Ruiz	(Guatemala) Municipal	D.C. United	Allocation
February 20, 2013	(Northern Ireland) Jonny Steele	Unattached	New York Red Bulls	Free
February 21, 2013	(Colombia) Olmes García	(Colombia) Deportes Quindío	Real Salt Lake	Undisclosed
February 21, 2013	(United States) Clint Irwin	(United States) Charlotte Eagles	Colorado Rapids	Free
February 21, 2013	(United States) Michael Nanchoff	Unattached	Portland Timbers	Free
February 21, 2013	(England) Nigel Reo-Coker	Unattached	Vancouver Whitecaps FC	Free
February 22, 2013	(Canada) Nana Attakora	(Finland) Haka	San Jose Earthquakes	Free
February 22, 2013	(Mexico) Giovani Casillas	(Mexico) Guadalajara	Chivas USA	Loan
February 22, 2013	(Mexico) Mario de Luna	(Mexico) Guadalajara	Chivas USA	Loan
February 22, 2013	(Mexico) Edgar Mejía	(Mexico) Guadalajara	Chivas USA	Loan
February 22, 2013	(Puerto Rico) Josh Saunders	Unattached	Real Salt Lake	Free
February 22, 2013	(Jamaica) Khari Stephenson	Unattached	Real Salt Lake	Free
February 23, 2013	(Mali) Djimi Traoré	Unattached	Seattle Sounders FC	Free
February 25, 2013	(Canada) Simon Thomas	Unattached	Vancouver Whitecaps FC	Free
February 26, 2013	(Panama) Marcos Sánchez	(Panama) Tauro	D.C. United	Loan
February 26, 2013	(Mexico) Joaquín Velázquez	(Mexico) Guadalajara	Chivas USA	Loan
February 26, 2013	(Peru) Walter Vílchez	(Peru) Sporting Cristal	Chivas USA	Undisclosed
February 27, 2013	(United States) Quincy Amarikwa	Toronto FC	Chicago Fire	Trade
February 27, 2013	(England) Hogan Ephraim	(England) Queens Park Rangers	Toronto FC	Loan
February 27, 2013	(United States) Emilio Orozco	(Mexico) UANL	Chivas USA	Free
February 27, 2013	(United States) Josue Soto	Unattached	Chivas USA	Free
February 27, 2013	(Poland) Konrad Warzycha	Unattached	Columbus Crew	Free
February 28, 2013	(Haiti) Mechack Jérôme	(United States) Orlando City	Sporting Kansas City	Free
February 28, 2013	(Democratic Republic of the Congo) Danny Mwanga	Portland Timbers	Colorado Rapids	Trade
February 28, 2013	(Martinique) Frédéric Piquionne	(England) West Ham United	Portland Timbers	Free
February 28, 2013	(Canada) Kyle Porter	Vancouver Whitecaps FC	D.C. United	Trade
March 1, 2013	(United States) Daniel Antúnez	(Finland) Inter Turku	Chivas USA	Free
March 1, 2013	(Trinidad and Tobago) Cordell Cato	Seattle Sounders FC	San Jose Earthquakes	Trade
March 1, 2013	(United States) Mike Chabala	Unattached	Houston Dynamo	Free
March 1, 2013	(Wales) Robert Earnshaw	(Wales) Cardiff City	Toronto FC	Free
March 1, 2013	(United States) Chandler Hoffman	Philadelphia Union	Los Angeles Galaxy	Trade
March 1, 2013	(United States) Julio Morales	(Mexico) Guadalajara	Chivas USA	Loan
March 1, 2013	(Mexico) José Manuel Rivera	(Finland) RoPS	Chivas USA	Free
March 1, 2013	(England) Darel Russell	Unattached	Toronto FC	Free
March 2, 2013	(United States) Rich Balchan	Unattached	Real Salt Lake	Free
March 5, 2013	(United States) Matt Kassel	(United States) Pittsburgh Riverhounds	Philadelphia Union	Free
March 8, 2013	(England) John Bostock	(England) Tottenham Hotspur	Toronto FC	Loan
March 11, 2013	(Trinidad and Tobago) Carlyle Mitchell	Vancouver Whitecaps FC	(Canada) FC Edmonton	Loan
March 12, 2013	(Sierra Leone) Abu Tommy	(Moldova) FC Sheriff	San Jose Earthquakes	Undisclosed
March 14, 2013	(United States) Christian Duke	Sporting Kansas City	(United States) Orlando City	Loan
March 14, 2013	(England) Dom Dwyer	Sporting Kansas City	(United States) Orlando City	Loan
March 14, 2013	(United States) Jon Kempin	Sporting Kansas City	(United States) Orlando City	Loan
March 14, 2013	(Cameroon) Yann Songo'o	Sporting Kansas City	(United States) Orlando City	Loan
March 15, 2013	(Honduras) Walter Martínez	Unattached	San Jose Earthquakes	Free
March 15, 2013	(Nigeria) Obafemi Martins	(Spain) Levante	Seattle Sounders FC	Undisclosed
March 18, 2013	(Cameroon) Marius Obekop	Unattached	New York Red Bulls	Free
March 18, 2013	(Austria) Rafhinha	(Brazil) Toledo	New York Red Bulls	Undisclosed
March 19, 2013	(United States) Alec Kann	(United States) Charleston Battery	Chicago Fire	Free
March 19, 2013	(United States) Taylor Kemp	D.C. United	(United States) Richmond Kickers	Loan
March 19, 2013	(France) Péguy Luyindula	Unattached	New York Red Bulls	Free
March 19, 2013	(Jamaica) Michael Seaton	D.C. United	(United States) Richmond Kickers	Loan
March 19, 2013	(United States) Conor Shanosky	D.C. United	(United States) Richmond Kickers	Loan
March 19, 2013	(United States) Casey Townsend	D.C. United	(United States) Richmond Kickers	Loan
March 21, 2013	(Honduras) Ramón Núñez	Unattached	FC Dallas	Free
March 22, 2013	(United States) Kevin Hartman	Unattached	New York Red Bulls	Free
March 22, 2013	(Denmark) Philip Lund	(Denmark) Fyn	Seattle Sounders FC	Undisclosed
March 22, 2013	(United States) Brian Ownby	Houston Dynamo	(United States) Richmond Kickers	Loan
March 25, 2013	(United States) Freddy Adu	Philadelphia Union	(Brazil) Bahia	Free
March 25, 2013	(Mexico) Cristhian Hernández	Philadelphia Union	(United States) Harrisburg City Islanders	Loan
March 25, 2013	(United States) Greg Jordan	Philadelphia Union	(United States) Harrisburg City Islanders	Loan
March 25, 2013	(Brazil) Kléberson	(Brazil) Bahia	Philadelphia Union	Loan
March 25, 2013	(United States) Jimmy McLaughlin	Philadelphia Union	(United States) Harrisburg City Islanders	Loan
March 25, 2013	(United States) Ryan Richter	(United States) Charleston Battery	Toronto FC	Undisclosed
March 26, 2013	(United States) Zarek Valentin	Montreal Impact	(Norway) Bodø/Glimt	Loan
March 27, 2013	(United States) Bilal Duckett	New England Revolution	(United States) Rochester Rhinos	Loan
March 27, 2013	(United States) Matt Horth	New England Revolution	(United States) Rochester Rhinos	Loan
March 27, 2013	(United States) Gabe Latigue	New England Revolution	(United States) Rochester Rhinos	Loan
March 27, 2013	(United States) Tyler Polak	New England Revolution	(United States) Rochester Rhinos	Loan
March 28, 2013	(United States) Andre Akpan	Colorado Rapids	New York Red Bulls	Trade
April 1, 2013	(United States) Kellen Gulley	Chicago Fire	(United States) Atlanta Silverbacks	Loan
April 3, 2013	(United States) Andrew Dykstra	D.C. United	(United States) Richmond Kickers	Loan
April 4, 2013	(United States) Alexandre González	(Mexico) Necaxa	San Jose Earthquakes	Undisclosed
April 5, 2013	(United States) Alex Dixon	Houston Dynamo	(United States) Tampa Bay Rowdies	Loan
April 8, 2013	(Argentina) Maximiliano Rodríguez	(Argentina) Argentinos Juniors	Montreal Impact	Loan
April 15, 2013	(United States) Patrick McLain	Chivas USA	(United States) Los Angeles Blues	Loan
April 19, 2013	(Italy) Daniele Paponi	(Italy) Bologna	Montreal Impact	Loan
April 26, 2013	(Argentina) Matías Laba	(Argentina) Argentinos Juniors	Toronto FC	Undisclosed
April 30, 2013	(Canada) Bryce Alderson	Vancouver Whitecaps FC	(United States) Charleston Battery	Loan
April 30, 2013	(Uruguay) Enzo Martinez	Real Salt Lake	(United States) Carolina RailHawks	Loan
May 2, 2013	(Ghana) Aminu Abdallah	(Ghana) International Allies	Vancouver Whitecaps FC	Undisclosed
May 3, 2013	(Norway) Pa Modou Kah	(Saudi Arabia) Al-Wehda	Portland Timbers	Undisclosed
May 6, 2013	(Colombia) Germán Mera	(Colombia) Deportivo Cali	Colorado Rapids	Loan
May 7, 2013	(United States) Juan Agudelo	Chivas USA	New England Revolution	Trade
May 7, 2013	(New Zealand) Jeremy Brockie	(New Zealand) Wellington Phoenix	Toronto FC	Loan
May 7, 2013	(Scotland) Steven Caldwell	(England) Birmingham City	Toronto FC	Loan
May 8, 2013	(United States) Jeff Attinella	Real Salt Lake	(United States) Fort Lauderdale Strikers	Loan
May 10, 2013	(Mexico) Martín Ponce	(Mexico) Guadalajara	Chivas USA	Loan
May 14, 2013	(United States) Gabriel Farfan	Philadelphia Union	Chivas USA	Trade
May 16, 2013	(United States) Bobby Convey	Sporting Kansas City	Toronto FC	Trade
May 22, 2013	(United States) Rauwshan McKenzie	Unattached	Portland Timbers	Free
May 23, 2013	(Mali) Bakary Soumaré	Philadelphia Union	Chicago Fire	Trade
May 25, 2013	(United States) Mike Magee	Los Angeles Galaxy	Chicago Fire	Trade
May 25, 2013	(United States) Robbie Rogers	Chicago Fire	Los Angeles Galaxy	Trade
May 28, 2013	(The Gambia) Sainey Nyassi	Unattached	D.C. United	Free
May 29, 2013	(United States) Aaron Horton	Columbus Crew	(United States) Los Angeles Blues	Loan
June 6, 2013	(Switzerland) Alain Rochat	Vancouver Whitecaps FC	D.C. United	Trade
June 12, 2013	(United States) Eriq Zavaleta	Seattle Sounders FC	(United States) San Antonio Scorpions	Loan
June 17, 2013	(United States) Pablo Mastroeni	Colorado Rapids	Los Angeles Galaxy	Trade
June 19, 2013	(North Macedonia) Oka Nikolov	(Germany) Eintracht Frankfurt	Philadelphia Union	Free
June 20, 2013	(Denmark) David Ousted	Unattached	Vancouver Whitecaps FC	Free
June 28, 2013	(Brazil) Fabinho	(Australia) Sydney FC	Philadelphia Union	Free
June 28, 2013	(United States) Clarence Goodson	(Denmark) Brøndby IF	San Jose Earthquakes	Free
June 28, 2013	(Jamaica) Alvas Powell	(Jamaica) Portmore United	Portland Timbers	Loan
July 1, 2013	(United States) Carlos Bocanegra	Unattached	Chivas USA	Allocation
July 2, 2013	(Scotland) Steven Caldwell	(England) Birmingham City	Toronto FC	Undisclosed
July 2, 2013	(United States) Michael Thomas	Sporting Kansas City	Toronto FC	Trade
July 3, 2013	(United States) Jared Jeffrey	Unattached	D.C. United	Waiver Wire
July 5, 2013	(Brazil) Erick	(Portugal) Portimonense	FC Dallas	Undisclosed
July 9, 2013	(Uruguay) Álvaro Fernández	Chicago Fire	(Uruguay) Nacional	Loan
July 9, 2013	(United States) Michael Nanchoff	Portland Timbers	(Sweden) Jönköpings Södra	Loan
July 9, 2013	(United States) Luis Silva	Toronto FC	D.C. United	Trade
July 9, 2013	(England) Jordan Stewart	Unattached	San Jose Earthquakes	Free
July 10, 2013	(Canada) Caleb Clarke	Vancouver Whitecaps FC	(Germany) FC Augsburg	Loan
July 10, 2013	(Jamaica) Shaun Francis	(United States) Charlotte Eagles	Chicago Fire	Free
July 10, 2013	(Mexico) Erick Torres	(Mexico) Guadalajara	Chivas USA	Loan
July 11, 2013	(United States) Kevin Ellis	Sporting Kansas City	(United States) Orlando City	Loan
July 11, 2013	(Switzerland) Alain Rochat	D.C. United	(Switzerland) BSC Young Boys	Undisclosed
July 11, 2013	(United States) C. J. Sapong	Sporting Kansas City	(United States) Orlando City	Loan
July 11, 2013	(Uganda) Ibrahim Sekagya	(Austria) Red Bull Salzburg	New York Red Bulls	Free
July 11, 2013	(United States) Andrew Weber	(United States) Phoenix FC	Seattle Sounders FC	Loan
July 12, 2013	(United States) Mark Bloom	(United States) Atlanta Silverbacks	Toronto FC	Loan
July 17, 2013	(El Salvador) Jaime Alas	(Norway) Rosenborg	San Jose Earthquakes	Loan
July 17, 2013	(Argentina) Mauro Díaz	(Argentina) River Plate	FC Dallas	Undisclosed
July 17, 2013	(Scotland) Calum Mallace	Montreal Impact	(United States) Minnesota United FC	Loan
July 17, 2013	(United States) Brandon McDonald	D.C. United	Real Salt Lake	Trade
July 17, 2013	(Bosnia and Herzegovina) Siniša Ubiparipović	Montreal Impact	(United States) Minnesota United FC	Loan
July 18, 2013	(United States) Conor Doyle	(England) Derby County	D.C. United	Loan via Lottery
July 18, 2013	(United States) Jaime Frias	(Mexico) Guadalajara	Chivas USA	Loan
July 19, 2013	(France) Laurent Courtois	Unattached	Los Angeles Galaxy	Free
July 22, 2013	(Colombia) Fredy Montero	Seattle Sounders FC	(Portugal) Sporting CP	Loan
July 23, 2013	(Ecuador) Juan Luis Anangonó	(Ecuador) El Nacional	Chicago Fire	Undisclosed
July 23, 2013	(Argentina) Hernán Bernardello	(Spain) Almería	Montreal Impact	Undisclosed
July 23, 2013	(Mexico) Richard Sánchez	FC Dallas	(United States) Fort Lauderdale Strikers	Loan
July 24, 2013	(England) Bradley Wright-Phillips	Unattached	New York Red Bulls	Free
July 25, 2013	(Spain) Álvaro Rey	(Spain) Xerez	Toronto FC	Undisclosed
July 26, 2013	(United States) Bryan Gaul	Los Angeles Galaxy	(United States) Fort Lauderdale Strikers	Loan
July 26, 2013	(Spain) Adrián López	(England) Wigan Athletic	Montreal Impact	Undisclosed
July 26, 2013	(United States) Kenney Walker	Los Angeles Galaxy	(United States) Fort Lauderdale Strikers	Loan
August 1, 2013	(Switzerland) Jonas Elmer	(Switzerland) FC Winterthur	Toronto FC	Undisclosed
August 2, 2013	(United States) C. J. Sapong	Sporting Kansas City	(United States) Orlando City	Loan
August 2, 2013	(Brazil) Gilberto	(Brazil) Atlético Sorocaba	Philadelphia Union	Undisclosed
August 3, 2013	(United States) Clint Dempsey	(England) Tottenham Hotspur	Seattle Sounders FC	Undisclosed
August 5, 2013	(Panama) Jaime Penedo	(Guatemala) Municipal	Los Angeles Galaxy	Free
August 6, 2013	(Uruguay) Vicente Sánchez	(Uruguay) Nacional	Colorado Rapids	Undisclosed
August 6, 2013	(Argentina) Diego Valeri	(Argentina) Lanús	Portland Timbers	Undisclosed
August 7, 2013	(Honduras) Alexander López	(Honduras) Olimpia	Houston Dynamo	Free
August 8, 2013	(Australia) David Carney	Unattached	New York Red Bulls	Free
August 8, 2013	(Panama) Gabriel Torres	(Venezuela) Zamora FC	Colorado Rapids	Undisclosed
August 9, 2013	(United States) Charlie Davies	(Denmark) Randers FC	New England Revolution	Loan
August 9, 2013	(Colombia) Jimmy Medranda	(Colombia) Deportivo Pereira	Sporting Kansas City	Loan
August 9, 2013	(Uruguay) Arévalo Rios	(Italy) Palermo	Chicago Fire	Loan
August 9, 2013	(United States) Brendan Ruiz	(Brazil) Figueirense	Sporting Kansas City	Free
August 11, 2013	(United States) Bobby Warshaw	FC Dallas	(Sweden) Ängelholms FF	Loan
August 15, 2013	(Switzerland) Dennis Iapichino	Unattached	D.C. United	Free
August 16, 2013	(Colombia) José Erick Correa	Chivas USA	(Argentina) Gimnasia	Loan
August 16, 2013	(Argentina) Maximiliano Urruti	(Argentina) Newell's Old Boys	Toronto FC	Undisclosed
August 20, 2013	(United States) Bryan de la Fuente	Unattached	Chivas USA	Free
August 21, 2013	(United States) Blair Gavin	Unattached	Seattle Sounders FC	Free
August 22, 2013	(United States) Bryan Gaul	Los Angeles Galaxy	(United States) Carolina RailHawks	Loan
August 22, 2013	(United States) Kenney Walker	Los Angeles Galaxy	(United States) Carolina RailHawks	Loan
August 27, 2013	(Peru) Carlo Chueca	Unattached	Chivas USA	Free
August 29, 2013	(Jamaica) O'Brian Woodbine	Unattached	New England Revolution	Free
August 30, 2013	(United States) Matthew Fondy	(United States) Los Angeles Blues	Chivas USA	Free
September 2, 2013	(Sierra Leone) Kei Kamara	Sporting Kansas City	(England) Middlesbrough	£900,000
September 5, 2013	(United States) Brad Ring	San Jose Earthquakes	Portland Timbers	Trade
September 9, 2013	(Nigeria) Bright Dike	Portland Timbers	Toronto FC	Trade
September 9, 2013	(Argentina) Maximiliano Urruti	Toronto FC	Portland Timbers	Trade
September 13, 2013	(Argentina) Federico Bessone	Unattached	Sporting Kansas City	Free
September 13, 2013	(United States) Servando Carrasco	Seattle Sounders FC	Houston Dynamo	Trade
September 13, 2013	(Ivory Coast) Yann Ekra	(United States) Harrisburg City Islanders	Philadelphia Union	Free
September 13, 2013	(United States) Chris Konopka	Philadelphia Union	Toronto FC	Trade
September 13, 2013	(Scotland) Adam Moffat	Houston Dynamo	Seattle Sounders FC	Trade

- ^1 Player officially joined his new club on January 1, 2013.
- ^2 Only rights to player were acquired.
