= Luis Silva =

Luis Silva may refer to:

== Sports ==
- Luis Silva (footballer, born 1879) (1879–1946), Spanish footballer
- Luis Silva (footballer, born 1988), Mexican footballer
- Luís Silva (footballer, born 1992), Portuguese football midfielder
- Luís Silva (footballer, born 1999), Portuguese football defender
- Luís Silva (boccia) (born 1980), Portuguese boccia player
- Luís Silva (fencer) (born 1972), Portuguese fencer
- Luis Silva (swimmer), Brazilian paralympic swimmer
- Luis Cardoso da Silva (born 1984), Brazilian paracanoeist

== Others ==
- Luis Silva Silva (fl. 1910s), Chilean jurist
- Luis Silva Parra (1931–2015), Ecuadorian saxophonist
- Luis Silva (songwriter) (1943–2008), American Tejano songwriter
- Luis Silva Irarrázaval (born 1978), Chilean lawyer and Constitutional Council member
- Luis Silva (comedian) (born 1978), Cuban comedian
- Luís Filipe Silva (born 1969), Portuguese writer of science fiction

== See also ==
- Luiz Silva Filho (born 1983), Brazilian football goalkeeper
