= Mariannah y Diego =

Christian music duo

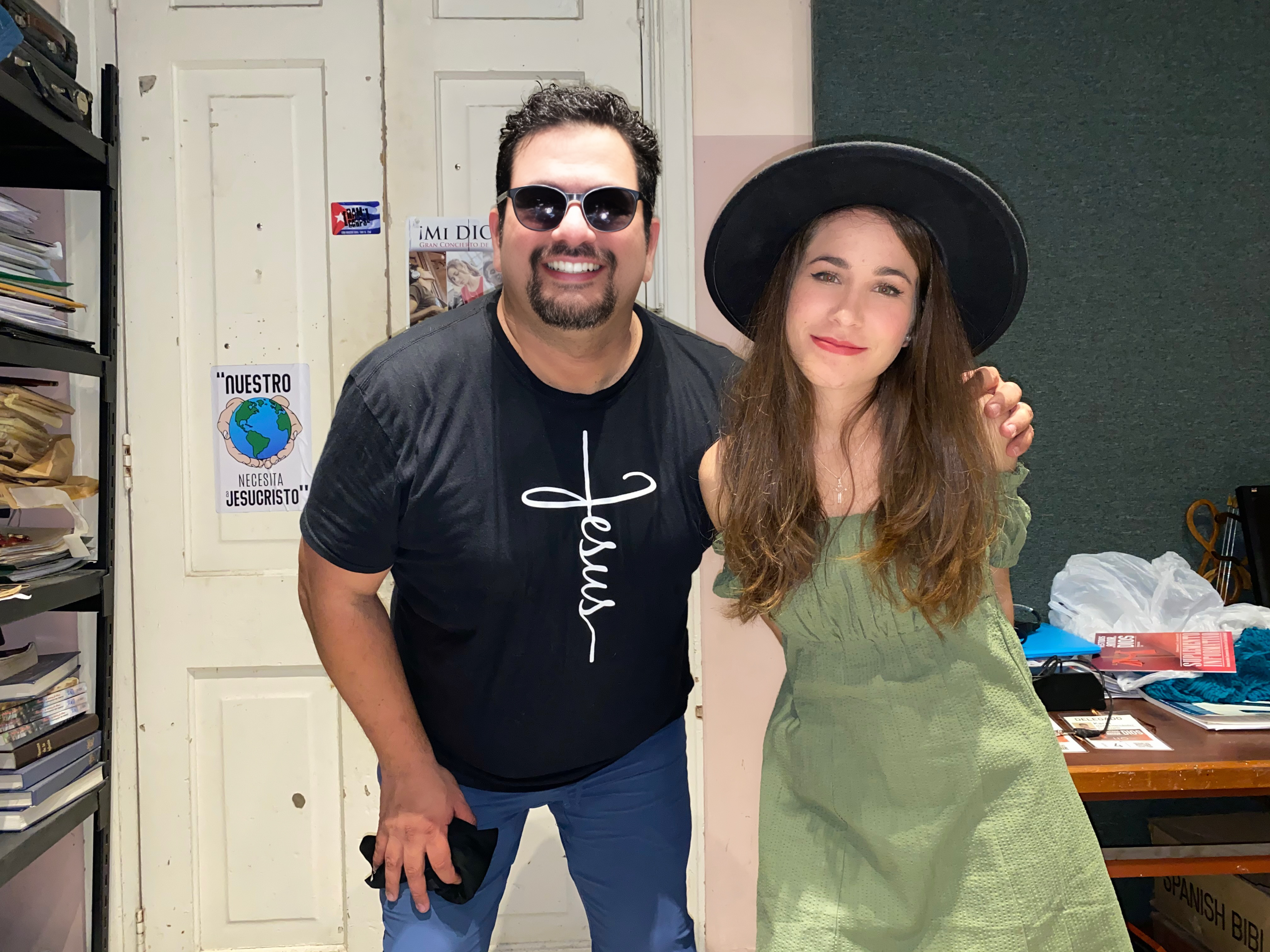
- Diego Archer and Mariannah Aguilera, the duo's members

Background information
- Origin: Dallas, Texas, U.S. / Palm Coast, Florida, U.S.
- Genres: Christian music; electropop; chillwave; tropical house; gospel; funk
- Years active: 2020–present
- Label: Christian MYDIA (distributed by Symphonic Distribution)
- Members: Mariannah Aguilera; Diego Archer
- Website: mariannahydiego.com

Mariannah y Diego (also known as MYD) is a Christian music duo formed by Cuban singer Mariannah Aguilera and Salvadoran-born producer Diego Archer. Their sound blends electronic production with live instruments, drawing on disco, pop, tropical house, chillwave and gospel. The duo has received awards including Premios El Galardón Internacional (2022), the Praise Music Awards, and Premios Radikal as best group/duo (2024).

== History ==
=== Formation (2016–2020) ===
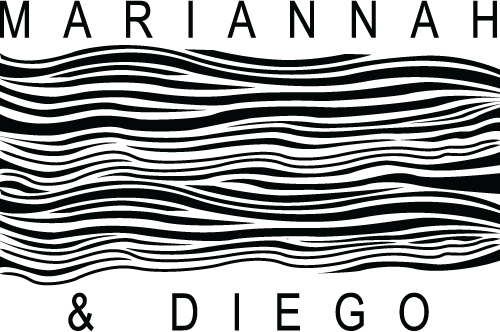
Logo of the duo

Aguilera (vocals, guitar and keyboards), from Havana, Cuba, and Archer (programming, composition, guitars and keyboards), born in San Salvador, El Salvador, and based in Dallas, Texas, met in 2016 during a mission trip to Cuba and remained friends afterward. Archer, who had converted to Christianity in 2011, proposed forming a duo that would use modern electronic music to draw young people to church; Aguilera, then living in Havana, accepted after a period of deliberation.

The duo officially launched on February 14, 2020, with the release of their debut single "Bello Eres". Working remotely across borders, Archer arranged and recorded instrumentation in Dallas while Aguilera recorded lead vocals in Havana. Symphonic Latino named them among its top rising artists of 2020.

=== Albums and collaborations (2020–2023) ===
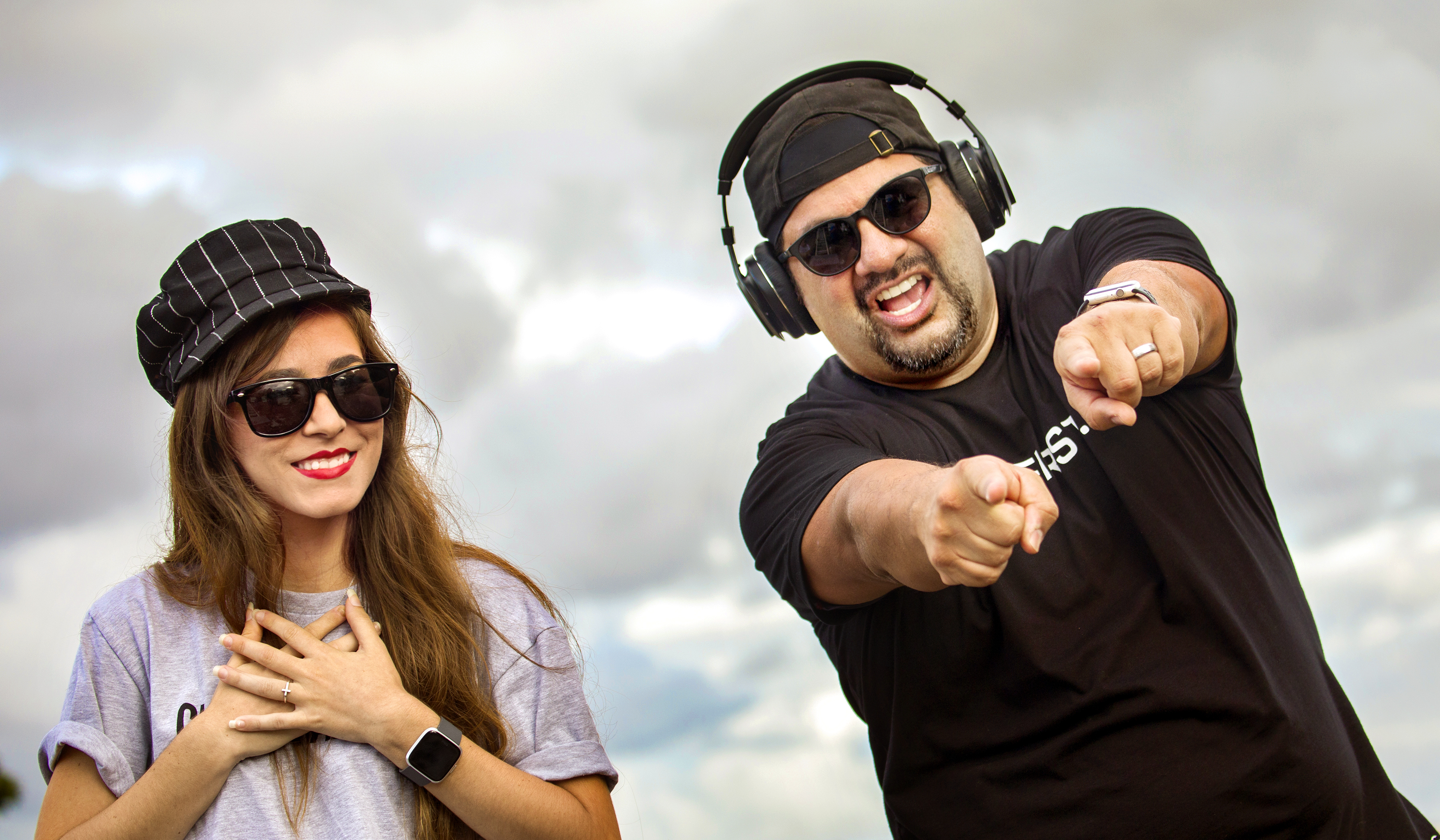
The duo following their 2020 debut

Their debut studio album, Comienzo (2020), compiled the singles released earlier that year. The duo followed with Primer Acústico (2020), Christmas Multicultural Concert (2021), ...y Continuamos (2022) and Con Amigos I (2022), the latter promoted with the single "Alentador". They also released the single "Profundo II", a collaboration with Cuban singer Leonardo Vera. Symphonic Latino named the duo among its most promising artists for 2021, and early singles such as "Llamado de Dios" and "Consume Mi Alma" (both 2021) drew coverage from English-language outlets including GigSoup, The Christian Beat and Jesus Freak Hideout.

The pair founded Christian MYDIA, an organization supporting under-resourced radio and music ministries. In 2022, they won the Premios El Galardón Internacional in the gospel duo category and collaborated with pianist Puchi Colón on "Fuego de Dios".

In August 2023 they released the single "Ciegos", a collaboration with Argentine singer Sophiv and Uruguayan singer Belu Rodríguez. Their album Con Amigos II, released on October 20, 2023, featured guest artists including Belu Rodríguez Kuhn, Sophiv, Puchi Colón, Leonardo Vera and Rupert Dnamiko.

=== "Te Busqué" and recognition (2024–present) ===
In October 2024, the duo released "Te Busqué", a song written from the first-person perspective of God addressing a non-believer. Its music video, filmed in Cuba and Colombia, featured Colombian actress Katherine Escobar Farfán. The song contributed to a series of awards for the duo, including wins at the Praise Music Awards in Colombia and the Premios Radikal in Florida. In January 2024 the duo had released "Doctrina", whose animated music video received four nominations at Cuba's Premios Lucas later that year.

The duo also released the acoustic album Segundo Acústico (con la congregación) in February 2024, followed later that year by Adoración en Acústico and the single "Vivo de Verdad" with Dominican artist Joel Gomera, and in 2025 by the album Sublime Adoración. In 2025 they released the conceptual album Siempre, which pairs retro synth-driven production with worship themes; its associated singles included the synthwave tracks "Luz" and "En Las Calles". In October 2025 they released "Enfrenta Este Día" with Cuban producer Jhazi, and that month the music video for "Máscara", a collaboration with rapper Casdapro directed by Argentine filmmaker Tomás Widmann, received two nominations at the Premios Lucas 2025, for Best Animation and Best Pop/Rock Video.

In March 2026 the duo released "La Historia de Dos Amigos", a collaboration with Dominican singer-songwriter Odanis BSK centered on friendship and loyalty, followed in May by "Tuya es la Victoria", a single blending rock, country and soul.

On June 26, 2026, the duo released the album Al Señor, a ten-song production addressing everyday challenges from a biblical perspective, with themes including faithfulness, repentance, gratitude and perseverance. Its lead single, "Sé Fiel", is a Christian pop song about anxiety related to the passage of time.

== Members ==
- Mariannah Aguilera – vocals, guitar, keyboards
- Diego Archer – programming, composition, guitars, keyboards

== Discography ==
=== Studio albums ===
- Comienzo (2020)
- Primer Acústico (2020)
- Christmas Multicultural Concert (2021)
- ...y Continuamos (2022)
- Con Amigos I (2022)
- Con Amigos II (2023)
- Sesiones (live EP, 2023)
- Segundo Acústico (con la congregación) (2024)
- Adoración en Acústico (2024)
- Alabando (2024)
- Sublime Adoración (2025)
- Siempre (2025)
- Al Señor (2026)

=== Selected singles ===
- "Bello Eres" (2020)
- "Llamado de Dios" (2021)
- "Ascenso" (2021)
- "Think About It" (with Sara Borraez and Afo) (2021)
- "Consume Mi Alma" (2021)
- "Huellas en la Arena" (2021)
- "Profundo II" (with Leonardo Vera) (2022)
- "Fuego de Dios" (with Puchi Colón) (2022)
- "Ciegos" (with Sophiv and Belu Rodríguez) (2023)
- "Doctrina" (2024)
- "Te Busqué" (2024)
- "Vivo de Verdad" (with Joel Gomera) (2024)
- "Luz" (2025)
- "En Las Calles" (2025)
- "Enfrenta Este Día" (with Jhazi) (2025)
- "Máscara" (with Casdapro) (2025)
- "La Historia de Dos Amigos" (with Odanis BSK) (2026)
- "Lo Que Viene" (with Odanis BSK and Ander Bock) (2026)
- "Tuya es la Victoria" (2026)
- "Sé Fiel" (2026)

== Awards and nominations ==
Year	Award	Category	Work	Result	Ref.
2022	Premios El Galardón Internacional	Best International Group/Duo	Themselves	Won	
2022	Praise Music Awards	Best International Video	"Huellas en la Arena"	Nominated	
2022	Praise Music Awards	International Gold Record	Themselves	Won	
2022	Premios Symphonic Latino	Music Video of the Year	"No Soy Perfecta"	Won	
2023	Praise Music Awards	Best International Group/Duo	Themselves	Nominated	
2023	Latino Diamond Awards	Song of the Year	"Ciegos"	Nominated	
2024	Praise Music Awards	Best International Group/Duo	Themselves	Won	
2024	Praise Music Awards	International Song of the Year	"Doctrina"	Nominated	
2024	Premios Radikal	Best Group	Themselves	Won	
2024	Premios Radikal	Best Duo	Themselves	Won	
2024	Premios Lucas	Best Animated Video	"Doctrina"	Nominated	
2024	Premios Lucas	Best Pop/Rock Video	"Doctrina"	Nominated	
2024	Premios Lucas	Best New Artist Video	"Doctrina"	Nominated	
2024	Premios Lucas	Ópera Prima	"Doctrina"	Nominated	
2025	Premios Lucas	Best Animation	"Máscara" (with Casdapro)	Nominated	
2025	Premios Lucas	Best Pop/Rock Video	"Máscara" (with Casdapro)	Nominated	
