= 2013 U.S. Open Cup final =

2013 final of the Lamar Hunt U.S. Open Cup

- Event: 2013 U.S. Open Cup
Real Salt Lake	D.C. United
MLS	MLS
0	1
- Date: October 1, 2013
- Venue: Rio Tinto Stadium, Sandy, Utah, United States
- Man of the Match: Bill Hamid
- Referee: Juan Guzman (California)
- Attendance: 17,608
- Weather: Clear, 71 °F (22 °C)

The 2013 Lamar Hunt U.S. Open Cup final was the 100th edition of the Lamar Hunt U.S. Open Cup, the oldest ongoing competition in American soccer. The match featured Major League Soccer (MLS) teams D.C. United and Real Salt Lake. It was played on October 1, 2013, at Rio Tinto Stadium in Sandy, Utah, a southern suburb of Salt Lake City. It was the first Open Cup final to be held in the state of Utah. The final score was D.C. United 1, Real Salt Lake 0. This was D.C. United's third title.

It was the first final since 2008 not to feature Seattle Sounders FC. It was Salt Lake's first trip to the Open Cup final, and marked their first time in a final of any competition since the 2011 CONCACAF Champions League Finals. It was D.C. United's fifth, and their first time in the final of a major North American sporting competition since 2009, when they lost the 2009 Open Cup final to Seattle.

D.C. United, the winner of the match, earned a $250,000 cash prize, as well as a berth into the 2014–15 CONCACAF Champions League. Real Salt Lake, the runner-up, received a $60,000 cash prize. D.C. United had a 5–0 record in the tournament, despite posting a 3-24-7 record in MLS play.

== Road to the final ==
The U.S. Open Cup is an annual American soccer competition open to all United States Soccer Federation affiliated teams, from amateur adult club teams to the professional clubs of MLS. The 2013 tournament was the centennial edition of the oldest soccer tournament in the United States.

For the second consecutive season, all American-based MLS teams earned automatic qualification into the third round tournament proper. Previously, only eight teams from MLS could qualify for the tournament, six automatically based on the previous year's league results, and two more via a play-in tournament.

=== D.C. United ===
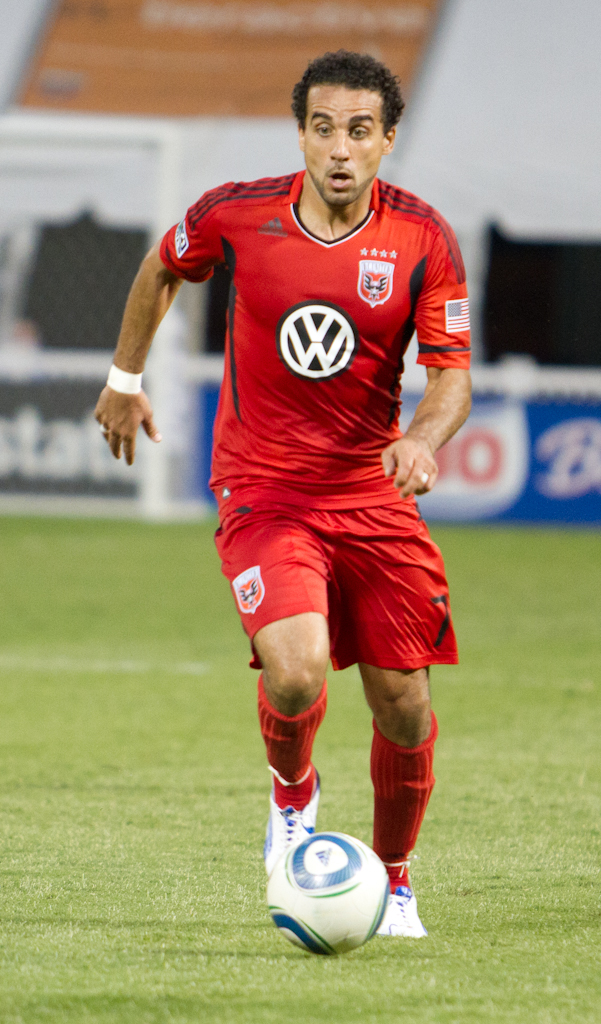
Dwayne De Rosario was D.C. United's top scorer in the cup with five goals.

Prior to 2013, D.C. United had won the U.S. Open Cup 2 times, in 1996 and 2008. They had played in 4 finals of the competition, with the last appearance being in 2009 when they lost 2–1 to Seattle Sounders FC.

In the 2013 third round, they faced the Richmond Kickers of the USL PRO at City Stadium in Richmond, Virginia, on May 28, 2013. After a goalless draw after extra time, D.C. United won on penalties 4–2. In the fourth round, they played at home against the Philadelphia Union of MLS in Boyds, Maryland, on June 12, 2013. D.C. United won 3–1. Dwayne De Rosario scored 3 goals for United. The first came in the 24th minute of the first half, followed by goals in the 75th and 85th minutes. The only goal scored by Philadelphia was by Jack McInerney in the 76th minute.

In the quarterfinals, D.C. United played at home on June 26, 2013, against the New England Revolution. D.C. won 3–1 with goals from Chris Pontius, Dwayne De Rosario, and Lionard Pajoy in the 45th, 69th, and 87th minutes, respectively.

In the semifinals, D.C. United played on the road against the Chicago Fire on August 7, 2013, at Toyota Park in Bridgeview, Illinois. The final score was 2–0 with goals from Dwayne De Rosario and Nick DeLeon, thus sealing United's place in the cup final.

=== Real Salt Lake ===
Real Salt Lake's best finish prior to the 2013 tournament was in 2011, when they reached the quarterfinals, losing 2–0 away to FC Dallas. On May 28, 2013, Real played in the third round at home versus the Atlanta Silverbacks of the NASL at Rio Tinto Stadium. The result was a 3–2 win in overtime. In the fourth round, they played against the Charleston Battery of the USL PRO league on June 12, 2013. Real Salt Lake won 5–2 after extra time.

In the quarterfinals, Real played against the Carolina RailHawks of the NASL on June 26, 2013. Salt Lake won 3–0 with goals from Tony Beltran in the 35th minute, Chris Wingert in the 51st minute, and Álvaro Saborío in the 86th minute.

In the semifinals, Real played against the Portland Timbers of the MLS on August 7, 2013. The result was a 2–1 victory for Real with goals from Álvaro Saborío in the 7th minute and Joao Plata in the 78th minute. In the final minutes, Portland scored with a goal by Diego Valeri.

== Pre-match ==
=== Venue Selection ===
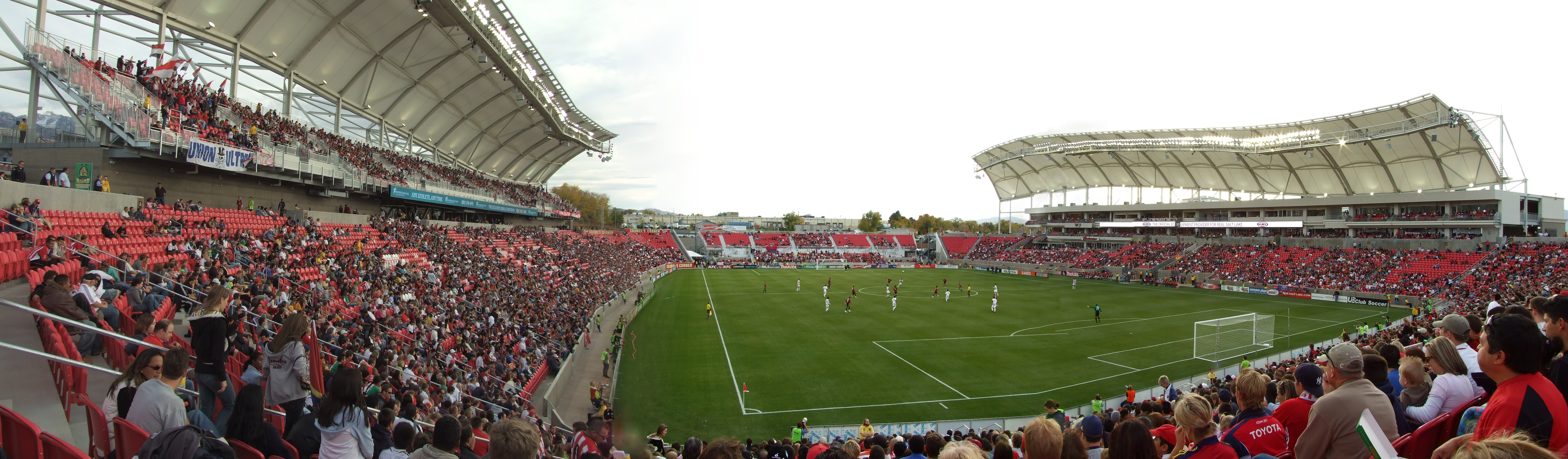
Rio Tinto Stadium, in Sandy, Utah.

The United States Soccer Federation conducted a coin flip on July 30, 2013, to determine the host of the tournament. The winner of the coin flip was the Portland Timbers/Real Salt Lake semifinal, meaning that whoever won that semifinal would host the final. As Salt Lake beat Portland 2–1 in that game, the final took place at Rio Tinto Stadium in Sandy, Utah.

== Match ==
The match was televised live on GolTV.

=== Match details ===
October 1, 2013
19:00 MDT

Real Salt Lake	0 – 1	D.C. United
	Report	Neal 45'

Rio Tinto Stadium
Sandy, Utah
Attendance: 17,608
Referee: Juan Guzman (California)

Real Salt Lake	D.C. United

Real Salt Lake:
GK	18	(United States) Nick Rimando	(yellow card) 90'
DF	2	(United States) Tony Beltran
DF	6	(United States) Nat Borchers
DF	16	(Mexico) Carlos Salcedo		(substituted off) 81'
DF	17	(United States) Chris Wingert
MF	5	(United States) Kyle Beckerman (c)	(yellow card) 45+2'
MF	26	(Colombia) Sebastián Velásquez		(substituted off) 69'
MF	20	(United States) Ned Grabavoy
MF	11	(Argentina) Javier Morales
FW	15	(Costa Rica) Álvaro Saborío
FW	8	(Ecuador) Joao Plata		(substituted off) 57'
Substitutes:
GK	24	(United States) Jeff Attinella
DF	7	(Jamaica) Lovel Palmer
MF	12	(United States) Cole Grossman
FW	13	(Colombia) Olmes García		(substituted on) 57'
DF	14	(Cuba) Yordany Álvarez
MF	23	(Jamaica) Khari Stephenson		(substituted on) 69'
MF	27	(United States) Chris Schuler
FW	49	(United States) Devon Sandoval		(substituted on) 81'
Manager:
(United States) Jason Kreis

D.C. United:
GK	28	(United States) Bill Hamid
DF	22	(United States) Chris Korb	(yellow card) 80'
DF	15	(United States) Ethan White
DF	5	(Canada) Dejan Jakovic
DF	2	(United States) James Riley	(yellow card) 21'
MF	18	(United States) Nick DeLeon	(yellow card) 58'
MF	8	(United States) John Thorrington
MF	23	(United States) Perry Kitchen
MF	24	(England) Lewis Neal
FW	7	(Canada) Dwayne De Rosario (c)		(substituted off) 75'
FW	13	(United States) Chris Pontius		(substituted off) 87'
Substitutes:
GK	31	(United States) Joe Willis
DF	3	(Switzerland) Dennis Iapichino
MF	12	(United States) Luis Silva	(substituted on) 75'
MF	19	(Canada) Kyle Porter
DF	21	(United States) Daniel Woolard
MF	25	(United States) Jared Jeffrey
FW	30	(United States) Conor Doyle	(substituted on) 87'
Manager:
(United States) Ben Olsen

Man of the Match:

Bill Hamid (D.C. United)

Assistant referees:
Kermit Quisenberry (Florida)
Fabio Tovar (California)
Fourth official:
Baldomero Toledo (California)

Match rules

- 90 minutes.
- 30 minutes of extra time if necessary.
- Penalty shoot-out if scores still level.
- Seven named substitutes.
- Maximum of three substitutions.

=== Statistics ===
Overall

	Salt Lake	D.C. United
Goals scored	0	1
Total shots	19	6
Shots on target	4	1
Saves	1	4
Corner kicks	10	1
Fouls committed	16	14
Offsides	3	3
Yellow cards	2	3
Red cards	0	0
