= Iapichino =

Iapichino is an Italian surname. Notable people with the surname include:

- Dennis Iapichino (born 1990), Swiss footballer
- Gianni Iapichino (born 1969), Italian athletics coach and former pole vaulter, long jumper and heptathlete
- Larissa Iapichino (born 2002), Italian long jumper
