= Luis Silva (comedian) =

Cuban comedian (born 1978)

- Born: Luis Daniel Silva de Francisco; October 9, 1978 (age 47); Havana, Cuba
- Education: University of Havana
- Employer: Cuban Institute of Radio and Television
- Notable work: Comedian or host of: Vivir del cuento; Lucas Awards; Coordenadas; La Hiena Ilustrada
- Spouse: Yarisley Martínez Fernández
- Children: • Luis Daniel Silva Martinez • Pilar Silva Martínez

Comedy career
- Years active: 2000–present
- Medium: Stand-up; television
- Genres: Political satire; observational comedy; surreal humor; black comedy
- Subjects: Cuban politics; Cuban culture; current events

Luis Daniel Silva de Francisco (born in Habana, 9 October 1978), known professionally as Luis Silva, is a Cuban comedian known for his television program Vivir del cuento (roughly live by the story") and his character Pánfilo.

In March 2016, he filmed a sketch with US President Barack Obama in which Pánfilo calls the White House and talks with Obama about his visit to Cuba.

Luis Silva has also hosted the "Lucas Awards" and has played his character "Pánfilo" in other Cuban comedy shows such as "La Hiena Ilustrada".
