= Daniel Woolard =

American soccer player

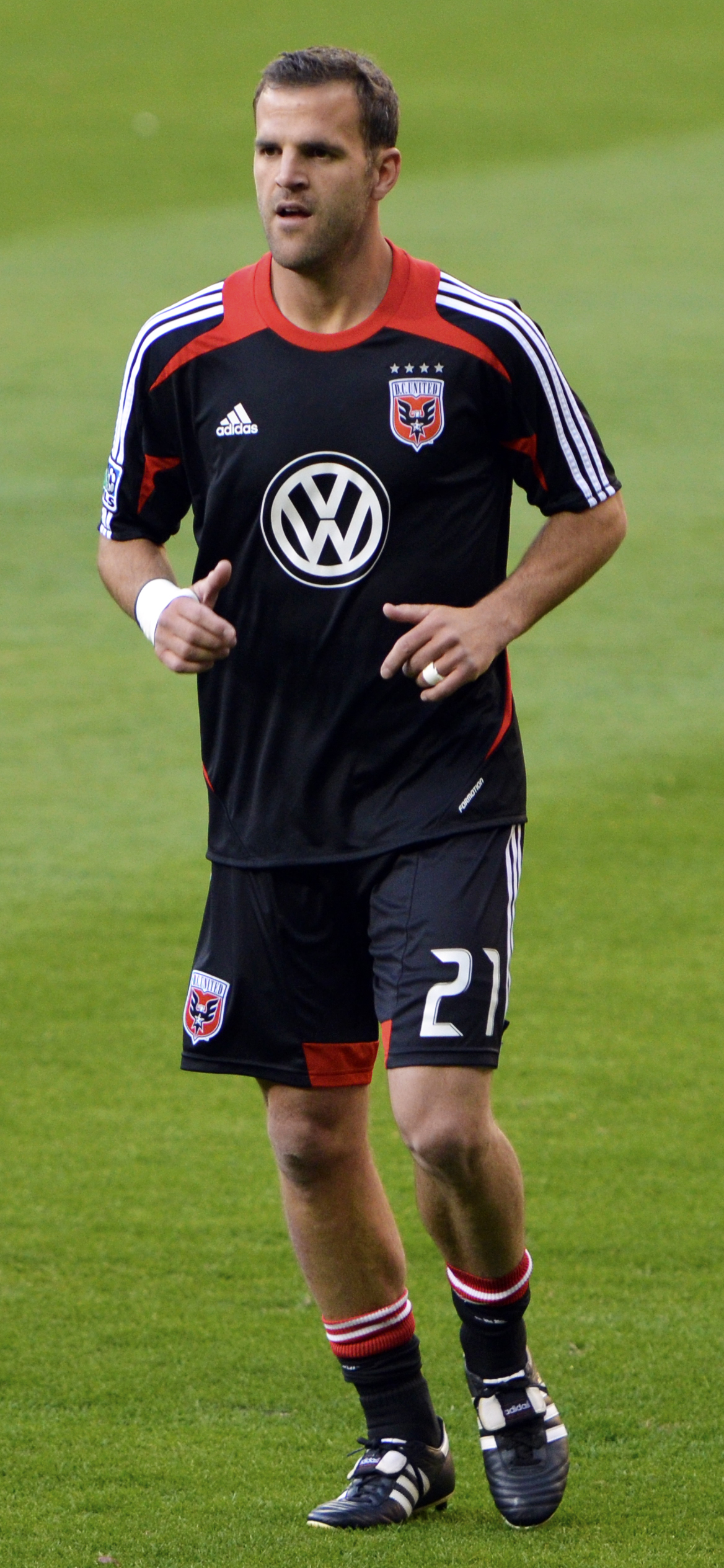

Personal information
- Full name: Daniel Woolard
- Date of birth: May 22, 1984 (age 42)
- Place of birth: Bedford, Texas, United States
- Height: 5 ft 10 in (1.78 m)
- Position: Defender

College career
Years	Team	Apps	(Gls)
2003–2006	Midwestern State Mustangs		

Senior career*
Years	Team	Apps	(Gls)
2005–2006	DFW Tornados	16	(0)
2007–2009	Chicago Fire	16	(1)
2010	DFW Tornados	3	(0)
2010	Carolina RailHawks	12	(0)
2011–2013	D.C. United	69	(2)
Total		116	(3)
- * Club domestic league appearances and goals as of October 4, 2013

Daniel Woolard (born May 22, 1984, in Bedford, Texas) is an American former professional soccer player.

== Early career ==
Woolard played college soccer at Midwestern State University in Wichita Falls, Texas, earning First Team All-American honors during his senior season. During college, he spent two seasons with the DFW Tornados in the USL Premier Development League.

== Professional career ==
In 2007, Woolard was drafted in the fourth round, 47th overall, by the Chicago Fire in the 2007 MLS Supplemental Draft, and spent the next three seasons in Major League Soccer, appearing in 16 first team games including 8 starts and scoring one goal.

After his release from Fire in February 2010, and having been unable to secure a professional contract elsewhere, he returned to play for the DFW Tornados in the PDL in 2010.

Woolard signed with the USSF D2 Carolina RailHawks in September 2010, and he started his first league match with the RailHawks against Crystal Palace Baltimore on September 3]. While with the RailHawks he played for the full duration of every match.

On January 6, 2011, Woolard returned to the MLS after being signed by D.C. United. Woolard impressed with DC, and became a starter as the season went by.

Finding a home with the Black and Red again in 2012, Woolard started 20 games on DC's backline. Woolard tallied his third MLS goal and contributed two assists in 1,754 minutes on the pitch. Woolard upheld his reputation as a constant performer on the back before suffering a concussion in August which left him sidelined until he was cleared during the 2012 MLS Playoffs. Woolard Concussion 2012

Woolard was cleared of his concussion symptoms during the 2012 Playoffs, and continued his stay as one of the most consistent players on the backline for DC United in 2013. Since joining the Black-and-Red on Jan. 6, 2011, Woolard has never played less than 20 games in each his first three seasons. In 2013, he played and started 27 games and dished out one assist while logging the fourth most minutes on the team (2,235).

He was released following the 2013 season and retired from professional soccer thereafter.

== Personal life ==
Woolard is the son of Marvin and Jane Woolard. He is married to Emily Woolard, and they have a pet Vizsla. Woolard is an avid Bowhunter and bass fisherman. He is a member of the Church of Jesus Christ of Latter-day Saints (LDS Church).

After retiring from professional soccer, Woolard enrolled in law school at Samford University's Cumberland School of Law, graduating with a Juris Doctor in May 2019 and obtaining his State Bar of Texas license in October 2019. He and his wife operate their own business Savvy Wool. He currently resides in Texas.

== Honors ==
=== D.C. United ===
- Lamar Hunt U.S. Open Cup (1): 2013
