= Rafael Gladiador =

Brazilian footballer (born 1992)

Personal information
- Full name: Rafael Teixeira de Souza
- Date of birth: 13 July 1992 (age 34)
- Place of birth: Água Boa, Brazil
- Height: 1.83 m (6 ft 0 in)
- Position: Striker

Youth career
- –2011: Bahia

Senior career*
Years	Team	Apps	(Gls)
2011–2014	Bahia	13	(1)
2013	→ D.C. United (loan)	7	(1)
2013	→ Atlético Goianiense (loan)	4	(0)
2014–2015	Atlético Zacatepec	4	(0)
2015	Xinjiang Tianshan Leopard	12	(6)
2017	Tupi	10	(2)
2019	Cabofriense	6	(1)
2019	Paços de Ferreira		
2020	Patrocinense	9	(1)
2020	Juventude		
2021	Palmas	8	(5)

International career^{‡}
2011	Brazil U20	3	(0)
- * Club domestic league appearances and goals as of 8 December 2021 ‡ National team caps and goals as of 14 September 2019

Rafael Teixeira de Souza (born 13 July 1992) in Água Boa, commonly known as Rafael Gladiador, is a former Brazilian footballer who played as a striker.

== Club career ==
In 2011, Rafael Gladiador signed for Bahia's first team from its reserve squad. In 36 appearances for Bahia he scored 10 goals.

On 9 January 2013, it was announced that he would join D.C. United as a young designated player on a one-year loan with a pre-negotiated option to make the move permanent. He scored his first goal for the team in his debut game on 23 March, a 2–1 home defeat to the Columbus Crew. After making four more appearances with United, Rafael suffered a concussion during training.

Rafael Gladiador and DC agreed to part ways in June 2013.

In July 2015, Rafael Gladiador transferred to China League One side Xinjiang Tianshan Leopard.

On 5 July 2019, Rafael Gladiador signed with Paços de Ferreira after a stint in Brazil with Cabofriense. However, he didn't play any games for the club, before he returned to Brazil, signing with Patrocinense in December 2019. In August 2020, he moved to Sociedade Esportiva Juventude.

Rafael joined Palmas ahead of the 2021 Campeonato Tocantinense.

== International career ==
Rafael has represented Brazil at the under-20 level 3 times.
