= Lucas Awards =

- Current: 2013 Lucas Awards
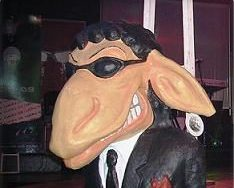
- Awarded for: Awarded for best music videos of the year
- Country: Cuba
- Presented by: Cuban Institute of Radio and Television

Television/radio coverage
- Network: Cubavisión

The Lucas Awards (Spanish: Premios Lucas) are awarded in Cuba for best music video. Once a year, generally in November, the nominees are announced. The program was created by Orlando Cruzata. The Lucas Awards are given out by the Cuban Institute for Radio and Television, an institute of the Cuban government and so--in U.S. terms--can be compared to a mix between MTV’s programming and broadcasting influence on the one hand, and the cultural credentials and government recognition of the National Endowment for the Arts on the other.

== See also ==
"Premios Lucas" on Spanish Wikipedia, including a list of winners
