= Luis Silva (footballer, born 1988) =

Mexican footballer

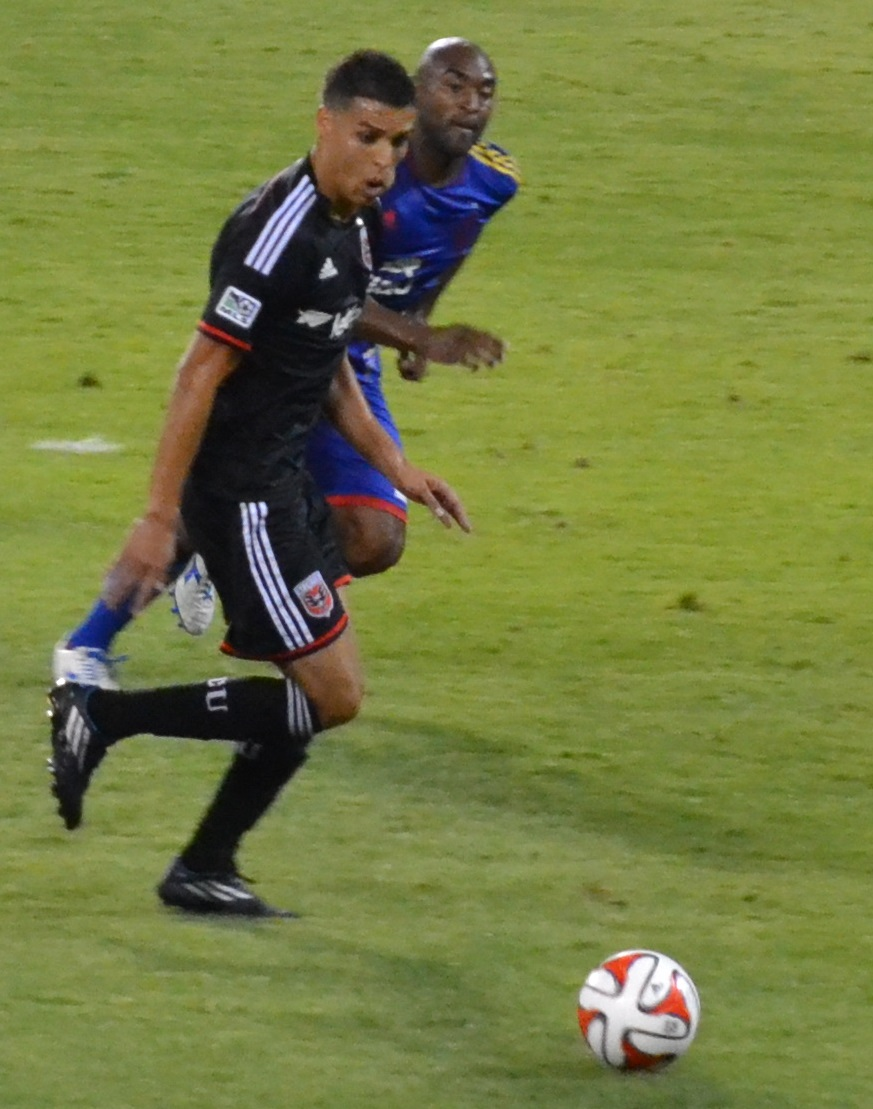
- Silva playing for D.C. United

Personal information
- Full name: Luis Saúl Silva López
- Date of birth: 10 December 1988 (age 37)
- Place of birth: Oaxaca, Mexico
- Height: 5 ft 11 in (1.80 m)
- Positions: Attacking midfielder; forward

Youth career
- 2004–2007: Salesian High School
- Chivas USA

College career
Years	Team	Apps	(Gls)
2008–2011	UC Santa Barbara Gauchos		

Senior career*
Years	Team	Apps	(Gls)
2011	Orange County Blue Star	10	(5)
2012–2013	Toronto FC	44	(5)
2013–2015	D.C. United	54	(15)
2015	Real Salt Lake	10	(0)
2016	Tigres UANL	0	(0)
2017–2018	Real Salt Lake	49	(12)
2019	Honka	13	(3)
2019	Seattle Sounders FC	5	(0)
- * Club domestic league appearances and goals as of 20 October 2019

Luis Saúl Silva López (Note: In this Spanish name, the first or paternal surname is Silva and the second or maternal family name is López.) (born 10 December 1988) is a Mexican former professional footballer who played as an attacking midfielder or forward.

== Early life and education ==
Silva was born in Oaxaca, Mexico, and moved to Los Angeles at a young age. Silva spent two years playing with local youth club Pateadores, helping them win the Premier Division in 2006, as well as spending two years with C.D. Chivas USA's U-19 team. Silva attended Bishop Mora Salesian High School in Los Angeles where he was a two-time All-CIF selection as a midfielder and forward. He was named Offensive Player of the Year in the 2007 season when he helped the Mustangs win the CIF Southern Section Championship and scored a goal in the Mustangs' 6–1 romp over Pasadena Marshall as the team set a finals scoring record. He went on to play collegiately with the UC Santa Barbara Gauchos. He was named to the All-Big West First Team three times. In his senior year, Silva scored 17 goals and added 10 assists, garnering recognition as a MAC Hermann Trophy Semifinalist.

== Playing career ==
During his college years, Silva also played in the USL Premier Development League for Orange County Blue Star in 2011. He joined UCSB teammates Charley Pettys and Christian Ramirez on the squad and finished with 5 goals and 2 assists in 10 matches played.

Luis Silva was selected 4th overall by Toronto FC in the first round of the 2012 MLS SuperDraft. Silva made his debut for Toronto FC on March 7, 2012, scoring a goal against the Los Angeles Galaxy in the 2011–12 CONCACAF Champions League quarterfinals. Silva scored his first league goal against Vancouver Whitecaps FC on July 11, the game ended in a 3–2 home victory. Three days after his first league goal, he scored the lone goal in an away victory over New England Revolution.

On July 9, 2013, it was announced that Silva had been traded to fellow MLS side D.C. United in exchange for allocation money. On his regular season debut on July 20, Silva scored from 30 yards (27 m) as his team lost 4–1 to the Chicago Fire. Silva appeared in the 2013 U.S. Open Cup Final on October 1, 2013, in the 75th minute and helped D.C. win 1–0 against Real Salt Lake and secure United's third U.S. Open Cup Championship. Silva scored a first half hat-trick against the Montreal Impact at Saputo Stadium on June 11, 2014, leading D.C. United to a 4–2 win.

On July 16, 2015, it was announced that Silva had been traded to MLS team Real Salt Lake for Álvaro Saborío. Silva ended his D.C. United career with 15 goals and six assists in 54 appearances, including a career-best 11 goals in 2014. In 2016, he moved to Liga MX side Tigres UANL.

On March 6, 2019, Silva joined Veikkausliiga side Honka on a one-year deal with an option for an additional year. He left the club in August to return to the United States, signing with Seattle Sounders FC in MLS. Silva and Seattle went on to win the 2019 MLS Cup. He was released by Seattle at the end of the 2019 season.

== Career statistics ==
As of match played on 25 July 2019

Appearances and goals by club, season and competition
Club	Season	League			Cup		Continental		League Cup		Total		Ref.
Club	Season	Division	Apps	Goals	Apps	Goals	Apps	Goals	Apps	Goals	Apps	Goals	Ref.
Toronto FC	2012	MLS	30	5	2	0	7 (Note: Appearances in the CONCACAF Champions League.)	2	—		39	7	
Toronto FC	2013	MLS	14	0	2	0	—		—		16	0	
Toronto FC	Total		44	5	4	0	7	2	—		55	7	—
D.C. United	2013	MLS	13	3	2	0	—		—		15	3	
D.C. United	2014	MLS	27	11	0	0	1	0	0	0	28	11	
D.C. United	2015	MLS	14	1	2	0	—		—		16	1	
D.C. United	Total		54	15	4	0	1	0	0	0	59	15	—
Real Salt Lake	2015	MLS	10	0	0	0	1	0	—		11	0	
Tigres	2016–17	Liga MX	0	0	0	0	2	0	0	0	2	0	
Real Salt Lake	2017	MLS	30	7	0	0	—		—		30	7	
Real Salt Lake	2018	MLS	19	5	1	0	—		1	0	21	0	
Real Salt Lake	Total		49	12	1	0	—		1	0	51	12	—
FC Honka	2019	Veikkausliiga	13	3	0	0	—		—		13	3	
Career total			170	35	9	0	11	2	1	0	191	35	—

== Awards and honors ==
Toronto FC

- Canadian Championship: 2012

D.C. United

- U.S. Open Cup: 2013

Tigres UANL

- Liga MX: Apertura 2016

Seattle Sounders FC

- MLS Cup: 2019
