= Dennis Iapichino =

Swiss footballer (born 1990)

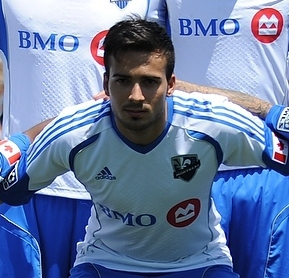
- Iapichino in 2013 with Montréal

Personal information
- Date of birth: 27 July 1990 (age 36)
- Place of birth: Frauenfeld, Switzerland
- Height: 1.82 m (6 ft 0 in)
- Positions: Defender; left-back

Team information
- Current team: Paradiso
- Number: 21

Youth career
- Frauenfeld
- –2008: Winterthur
- 2008–2009: Basel

Senior career*
Years	Team	Apps	(Gls)
2008–2010	Basel II	29	(1)
2009–2011	Basel	0	(0)
2009–2010	→ Biel-Bienne (loan)	12	(0)
2010–2011	→ Lugano (loan)	25	(0)
2011–2012	Lugano	20	(0)
2012–2013	Montreal Impact	16	(0)
2013	D.C. United	6	(0)
2014–2016	Winterthur	24	(0)
2016–2018	Siena	73	(1)
2018–2019	Livorno	6	(0)
2019	→ Servette (loan)	14	(2)
2019–2020	Servette	22	(0)
2020–2023	Sion	39	(0)
2023–2025	Rapperswil-Jona	37	(0)
2026–	Paradiso	8	(0)

International career
2010	Switzerland U21	6	(0)
- * Club domestic league appearances and goals as of 1 October 2026

Dennis Iapichino (born 27 July 1990) is a Swiss footballer who plays as defender, mainly left-back, and at present for Paradiso in the Promotion League, the third tier of the Swiss football league system.

== Club career ==
=== Youth football ===
Iapichino started his youth football with local amateur club Frauenfeld and he played in Team Thurgau, the regional selection. He then moved on and joined the Winterthur youth, staying there until 2008. He won the Swiss Cup with the FC Winterthur U-16 team.

Iapichino moved to the youth department of FC Basel and in the second half of the 2007–08 season, he played in the U-18 team. They ended the league season in third position but were able to win the cup at U-18 level. In the final held on 15 June 2008 in the Gurzelen football stadium in Biel/Bienne, the Basler juniors were a goal behind. But then, Marco Aratore scored the equaliser in the 68th minute and five minutes later the same player netted the winning goal, as Basel won 2–1 against the U-18 from Team-Luzern-Kriens. In the second half of the 2008–09 season he advanced to Basel's U-21, who played in the third tier of Swiss football and they became division (group2) winners and Swiss champions at the U-21 level. He played the first half of the next season with them too, but then, over the winter break it was decided that he would be loaned out to FC Biel-Bienne, who played in the second tier, for later part of 2009–10 Challenge League season.

In advance of the 2010–11 Challenge League season Iapichino was loaned out to second tier FC Lugano. He had 25 league appearances for them and played in two of the Cup games. The move was made permanent for the 2011–12 league season. However, a year later, on 12 July 2012 it was announced that he had left the club.

=== Major League Soccer ===
==== Montreal Impact ====
Iapichino signed with expansion side Montreal Impact of Major League Soccer on 11 July 2012. The team won the two legged Canadian Championship (Voyageurs Cup), 2013, held on 15 and 29 May. However, after a year with the club, Iapichino's contract was terminated due to disagreements with the coach. He parted ways with the club on 7 August 2013.

==== D.C. United ====
Iapichino signed with MLS club D.C. United on 15 August 2013. On 1 October 2013 D.C. United defeated Real Salt Lake 1-0 in the 100th edition of the Lamar Hunt 2013 U.S. Open Cup final. Since Iapichino's move took place in the middle of the season, he is the only player to have won both the Canadian and US Cups in the same season.

The club, based in Washington D.C., offered him a two-year contract, but Iapichino wanted to go home. Due to homesickness and longing for his family, Iapichino declined the contract extension and returned to Switzerland.

=== Winterthur ===
Over Christmas Iapichino returned to Switzerland but was without a club. But on 14 July 2014 it was announced that Iapichino had signed for Winterthur to play the 2014–15 Swiss Challenge League. After two seasons he left the club.

=== Italy ===
Iapichino moved to Italy. He played two seasons for Siena and then joined Livorno in summer 2018.

=== Servette ===
On 25 January 2019, he joined Servette on loan until the end of the 2018–19 season.

On 1 July 2019, transfer to Servette was made permanent.

=== Sion ===
On 14 September 2020, he moved to Sion. At the end of the 2020–21 Super League season Sion were in second last position and therefore had to play the relegation play-offs against Thun. They won the first leg, lost the second, but won 6–4 on aggregate and thus remained top tier.

=== Rapperswil-Jona ===
On 7 September 2023, Iapichino signed a contract with Rapperswil-Jona until the end of 2023.

== Honours ==
Winterthur

- Swiss Cup at U-16 level: 2006–07

Basel

- Swiss Cup at U-18 level: 2007–08
- Swiss champion at U-21 level: 2008–09

Montreal Impact

- Canadian Championship (Voyageurs Cup) : 2013

D.C. United

- U.S. Open Cup: 2013
