= Jared Jeffrey =

American soccer player (born 1990)

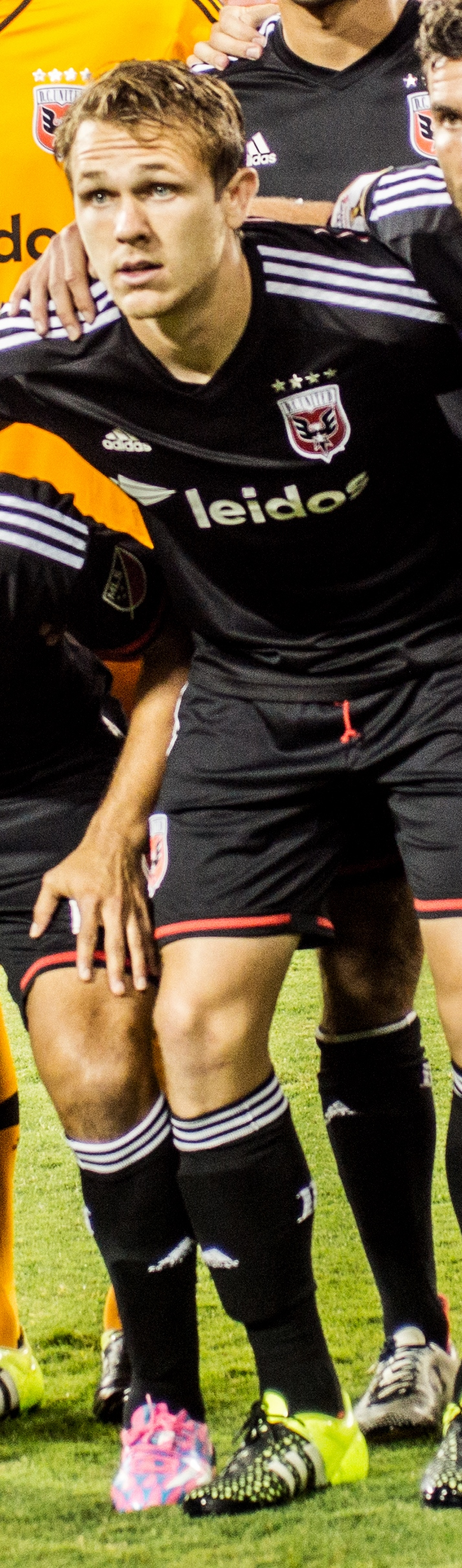
- Jeffrey with D.C. United in 2015

Personal information
- Full name: Jared Michael Jeffrey
- Date of birth: June 14, 1990 (age 36)
- Place of birth: Dallas, Texas, United States
- Height: 1.78 m (5 ft 10 in)
- Position: Midfielder

Youth career
- 2005–2007: IMG Soccer Academy
- 2007–2008: Dallas Texans
- 2008–2010: Club Brugge

Senior career*
| Years | Team | Apps | (Gls) |
| 2010 | 1. FSV Mainz 05 | 0 | (0) |
| 2010–2013 | 1. FSV Mainz 05 II | 87 | (4) |
| 2013–2018 | D.C. United | 68 | (5) |
| 2014–2015 | → Richmond Kickers (loan) | 9 | (1) |
| Total | | 164 | (10) |

International career^{‡}
| 2005–2007 | United States U17 | 39 | (3) |
| 2007 | United States U18 | 3 | (0) |
| 2008–2009 | United States U20 | 11 | (1) |
| 2012 | United States U23 | 2 | (0) |
Medal record
Representing United States
| Runner-up | CONCACAF U-20 Championship | 2009 |
- * Club domestic league appearances and goals as of October 30, 2018 ‡ National team caps and goals as of June 1, 2014

Jared Michael Jeffrey (born June 14, 1990) is an American former professional soccer player.

== Career ==
=== Youth ===
Jeffrey was born in Dallas, Texas. After winning the Parade Boys Soccer National High School Player of the Year in 2008, Jeffrey signed with Club Brugge KV of Belgium.

=== Senior ===
After the 2009 U-20 Men's World Cup, Jeffrey was sold to FSV. Mainz 05 of the Bundesliga under Thomas Tuchel in the winter transfer period in 2010. He played there for 3 1/2 seasons, mostly appearing for the reserve side.

=== D.C. United ===
On July 3, 2013, it was announced that Jeffrey had been picked up by Major League Soccer side D.C. United in a waiver draft. He debuted for D.C. United on July 27 against the New England Revolution in which he started and played 79 minutes as D.C. United lost the match 1–2. On August 3, Jeffrey scored his first goal with his new club, netting a pass from Conor Doyle to give United a 3–1 lead against Montreal Impact. United would go on to win by the same scoreline.

Jeffrey retired at the end of their 2018 season.

== International ==
Jeffrey had represented the United States at the under-17, under-20, and the under-23 levels. Jeffrey spent five semesters in the U-17 men's national team residency program, where he led all players with 39 caps. Jeffrey played for the U.S. U-17 men's national team in 2007 U-17 FIFA World Cup, making four starts as the US reached the Round of 16. The midfielder tallied once with a late penalty against Tunisia in the group stages. He captained the under-17 side during the 2007 FIFA U-17 World Cup and had played for the u20 side during the 2009 FIFA U-20 World Cup. He also was a member of the 2012 U-23 Men's team that failed to qualify for the Olympics.

== Career statistics ==
As of July 5, 2017

| Club | Season | League | | MLS Cup | | US Open Cup | | CONCACAF | | Total | |
| Club | Season | Apps | Goals | Apps | Goals | Apps | Goals | Apps | Goals | Apps | Goals |
|---|---|---|---|---|---|---|---|---|---|---|---|
| D.C. United | 2013 | 10 | 2 | 0 | 0 | 0 | 0 | 0 | 0 | 10 | 2 |
| D.C. United | 2014 | 10 | 0 | 0 | 0 | 1 | 0 | 3 | 0 | 14 | 0 |
| D.C. United | 2015 | 2 | 0 | 0 | 0 | 2 | 0 | 4 | 1 | 6 | 1 |
| D.C. United | 2016 | 21 | 2 | 1 | 0 | 1 | 0 | 0 | 0 | 23 | 2 |
| D.C. United | 2017 | 24 | 1 | 0 | 0 | 1 | 0 | 0 | 0 | 25 | 1 |
| Career total | | 67 | 5 | 1 | 0 | 5 | 0 | 7 | 1 | 78 | 6 |

== Honors ==
=== D.C. United ===
- Lamar Hunt U.S. Open Cup (1): 2013
