= All-time D.C. United roster =

This list comprises all players who have participated in at least one league match for D.C. United since the team's first Major League Soccer season in 1996. Players who were on the roster but never played in an MLS game are not listed.

== Players ==
Major League Soccer clubs are currently allowed a roster of 30 players at any one time during the MLS season. Players who were contracted to the club but never played an MLS game are not listed.

All statistics are for the MLS regular season games only, and are correct as of November 7, 2026.

=== Outfield players ===
Name	Position	Country	Years	Games	Goals	Assists	Minutes	Notes
Ramón Ábila	FW	Argentina	2021	12	3	0	214	—
Mohammed Abu	MF	Ghana	2020	6	0	0	332	—
Luciano Acosta	MF	Argentina	2016–2019	126	24	35	9400	—
Nicholas Addlery	FW	Jamaica	2007	11	1	2	455	—
Freddy Adu	MF	USA	2004–2006	87	11	17	5442	—
Jeff Agoos	DF	USA	1996–2000	135	6	17	11696	—
Miguel Aguilar	MF	Mexico	2015–2016	23	0	0	618	—
Matai Akinmboni	DF	USA	2022–2024	13	0	1	743	Homegrown
Lazo Alavanja	MF	USA	2002	17	0	0	1001	—
Chris Albright	DF	USA	1999–2001	56	4	2	3581	—
Jose Alegria	MF	Peru	2001–2003	38	1	3	2268	—
Tony Alfaro	DF	Mexico	2021–2022	43	1	2	2784	—
Daniel Allsopp	FW	Australia	2010	23	5	0	1456	—
Quincy Amarikwa	FW	USA	2019	23	1	1	414	—
Conner Antley	DF	USA	2024–	33	1	2	1813	—
Kevin Ara	MF	USA	2004	6	0	0	113	—
Stephen Armstrong	MF	South Africa	2001	15	3	0	1112	—
Davy Arnaud	MF	USA	2014–2015	54	2	3	4541	—
Jairo Arrieta	FW	Costa Rica	2015	27	5	2	1264	—
Paul Arriola	MF	USA	2017–2021	89	20	16	6924	—
Yamil Asad	MF	Argentina	2018, 2020–2021, 2023	90	14	13	5107	—
Raphael Augusto	MF	Brazil	2012–2013	7	0	0	395	—
Geoff Aunger	DF	Canada	1998–2000	74	4	11	5602	—
Oscar Avilez	MF	USA	2025–	6	0	0	237	Homegrown
Dominique Badji	FW	Senegal	2024–2025	30	2	0	1033	—
Fidel Barajas	MF	Mexico	2025	4	0	0	34	—
Devin Barclay	FW	USA	2003	3	0	0	113	—
Tai Baribo	FW	Israel	2026–	25	16	1	2081	—
Brandon Barklage	MF/DF	USA	2009–2011	11	0	0	341	—
Lucas Bartlett	DF	USA	2024–	93	6	6	8108	—
Brian Bates	MF	USA	1999	1	0	0	64	—
Christian Benteke	FW	Belgium	2022–2025	93	47	14	7650	—
Miguel Berry	FW	Spain	2022	14	0	0	713	—
Steve Birnbaum	DF	USA	2014–2024	254	13	6	21714	—
Emmanuel Boateng	MF	Ghana	2019–2020	3	0	0	51	—
Branko Bošković	MF	Montenegro	2010–2012	43	1	7	1976	—
Bobby Boswell	DF	USA	2005–2007,2014–2017	188	10	8	16543	—
Rodrigo Brasesco	DF	Uruguay	2011	3	0	0	155	—
Blake Brettschneider	FW	USA	2011	15	1	2	789	—
Frédéric Brillant	DF	France	2018–2021	99	5	3	8136	—
Deshorn Brown	FW	Jamaica	2017	16	2	1	788	—
Marc Burch	DF	USA	2007–2011	93	3	9	6830	—
Michael Burke	FW	USA	2000	7	0	0	290	—
Julian Büscher	MF	Germany	2016–2017	27	1	4	764	—
G.R. Cannon	DF	USA	2004	1	0	0	35	—
Russell Canouse	MF	USA	2017–2024	139	5	6	10925	—
Kasali Yinka Casal	MF	England	2007	4	0	1	104	—
Danny Care	DF	USA	1998	1	0	0	45	—
Junior Carreiro	MF	Brazil	2010–2011	3	0	0	43	—
Brian Carroll	MF	USA	2003–2007	121	2	11	9582	—
Jeff Carroll	MF	USA	2006–2008	2	0	0	100	—
Pat Carroll	DF	USA	2008	4	0	0	186	—
Alex Caskey	MF	USA	2014	11	0	0	198	—
Cristian Castillo	MF	El Salvador	2010	10	0	0	691	—
Ronald Cerritos	FW	El Salvador	2003–2004	20	3	2	1458	—
Mike Chabala	DF	USA	2012	3	0	0	143	—
Christian	DF	Spain	2014	15	0	1	1342	—
Caden Clark	MF	USA	2025–2026	11	0	1	221	—
Abdul Thompson Conteh	FW	Sierra Leone	2001–2002	30	15	1	1962	—
Bobby Convey	MF	USA	2000–2004	89	8	16	7253	—
Judah Cooks	MF	USA	1998–2001	23	2	1	876	—
Micah Cooks	MF	USA	2000–2001	6	0	1	167	—
Ryan Cordeiro	MF	USA	2008	8	0	1	207	—
Facundo Coria	MF	Argentina	2015	7	0	1	131	—
Ben Crawley	FW	USA	1996	5	0	0	82	—
Adam Cristman	FW	USA	2010	17	2	1	708	—
Arnold Cruz	DF	Honduras	1997	5	0	1	450	—
Danny Cruz	MF	USA	2012	16	1	3	969	—
Ali Curtis	FW	USA	2002–2003	37	6	5	1840	—
Austin da Luz	MF	USA	2011	14	0	1	616	—
Cristian Dájome	DF	Colombia	2023–2024	50	5	3	2701	—
Charlie Davies	FW	USA	2011	26	11	1	1553	—
Eric Davis	DF	Panama	2023	8	0	0	538	—
Dwayne De Rosario	MF	Canada	2011–2013	68	23	21	5286	—
Nick DeLeon	MF	USA	2012–2018	180	13	16	14180	—
Eric Denton	DF	USA	2000–2001	27	1	3	1887	—
Stephen DeRoux	MF	Jamaica	2005–2007	10	0	0	343	—
Raúl Díaz Arce	FW	El Salvador	1996–1997, 2000–2001	68	44	10	5743	—
John DiRaimondo	MF	USA	2009	1	0	0	45	—
Sofiane Djeffal	MF	France	2022	28	0	1	1685	—
Derek Dodson	DF	USA	2025	14	0	1	571	—
Francis Doe	FW	Liberia	2008–2009	14	2	0	475	—
Matías Donnet	MF	Argentina	2006	8	1	0	520	—
Conor Doyle	FW	USA	2013–2015	56	4	1	2254	—
Andre Dozzell	MF	England	2026–	19	1	1	1673	—
Chris Durkin	MF	USA	2016–2019, 2022–2023	96	5	9	6354	Homegrown
Rod Dyachenko	MF	Russia	2006–2008	42	1	3	1452	—
Kevin Ellis	DF	USA	2018	2	0	0	46	—
Luciano Emilio	FW	Brazil	2007–2009, 2010	87	41	8	6778	—
Boris Enow	MF	Cameroon	2024–2025	36	1	0	1934	—
Facundo Erpen	DF	Argentina	2005–2007	49	4	4	4203	—
Alecko Eskandarian	FW	USA	2003–2006	81	20	7	4485	—
Fabian Espindola	FW	Argentina	2014–2016	59	20	17	4396	—
David Estrada	FW	USA	2014	9	0	2	301	—
Michael Estrada	FW	Ecuador	2022	16	4	4	867	—
Marco Etcheverry	MF	Bolivia	1996–2003	191	34	101	16304	—
José Fajardo	FW	Panama	2023	7	0	0	243	—
Michael Farfan	MF	USA	2015	17	0	1	660	—
Said Fazlagić	DF	Bosnia and Herzegovina	1996	2	0	0	136	—
Lucio Filomeno	FW	Argentina	2003–2006	12	1	1	458	—
Oniel Fisher	DF	Jamaica	2018–2020	39	1	1	2505	—
Kristian Fletcher	FW	USA	2022–2025	28	2	2	498	Homegrown
Edison Flores	MF	Peru	2020–2022	41	3	8	2679	—
Taxiarchis Fountas	FW	Greece	2022–2023	38	18	4	2570	—
Sean Franklin	DF	USA	2014–2017	101	3	8	8530	—
Fred	MF	Brazil	2007–2009, 2011	89	11	17	5804	—
Marcelo Gallardo	MF	Argentina	2008	15	4	3	1161	—
Jeremy Garay	MF	El Salvador	2021–2024	2	0	0	9	Homegrown
George Gelnovatch	MF	USA	1996	2	0	0	135	—
Christian Gómez	MF	Argentina	2004–2007, 2009	124	45	33	9250	—
Ray Goodlett	DF	USA	1999–2001	4	0	0	223	—
Mario Gori	DF	Argentina	1996–1998	50	2	3	3376	—
Jordan Graye	DF	USA	2010	20	0	0	1662	—
Jacob Greene	DF	TRI	2020–2023	11	1	0	481	Homegrown
Julian Gressel	MF	Germany	2020–2022	73	4	23	5764	—
Joshua Gros	MF	USA	2004–2007	110	9	14	9077	—
Sami Guediri	DF	USA	2022	13	0	0	808	—
Iván Guerrero	MF	Honduras	2008	13	0	4	1149	—
Steve Guppy	MF	England	2008	5	0	1	285	—
Markus Halsti	MF	Finland	2015–2016	14	0	0	949	—
Ian Harkes	MF	USA	2017–2018	33	2	2	2300	Homegrown
John Harkes	MF	USA	1996–1998	83	14	23	7135	—
David Hayes	FW	USA	1999–2000	15	0	0	458	—
Silvan Hefti	DF	Switzerland	2026–	31	2	5	2574	—
Ezra Hendrickson	DF	St. Vincent and the Grenadines	2004	12	0	0	785	—
Pablo Hernández	MF	Chile	2010	14	0	1	1149	—
Aaron Herrera	DF	Guatemala	2024–2026	63	1	12	5048	—
Federico Higuaín	MF	Argentina	2020	10	2	0	155	—
Brendan Hines-Ike	DF	USA	2021–2023	45	1	1	3666	—
Jackson Hopkins	MF	USA	2022–	93	5	3	4875	Homegrown
Erik Hurtado	FW	USA	2023	7	0	0	271	—
Mike Huwiler	MF	USA	1996	5	0	0	247	—
Dennis Iapichino	DF	Switzerland	2013	6	0	0	382	—
Kennedy Igboananike	MF	Nigeria	2016	7	1	0	236	—
Erik Imler	MF	USA	1996–1997	19	0	0	1355	—
Samuel Inkoom	MF	Ghana	2014	2	0	1	70	—
Benedict Iroha	MF	Nigeria	1997	17	4	5	1104	—
Galin Ivanov	DF	Bulgaria	2003	24	1	1	2009	—
Andrew Jacobson	MF	USA	2009	17	0	0	845	—
Dejan Jakovic	DF	Canada	2009–2013	98	1	0	8454	—
Julius James	DF	Trinidad and Tobago	2009–2010	31	2	0	2388	—
Greg Janicki	DF	USA	2008–2009	10	0	0	638	—
Leonardo Jara	DF	Argentina	2019	30	1	5	2291	—
Mohanad Jeahze	DF	Iraq	2023–2024	7	0	2	367	—
Jared Jeffrey	MF	USA	2013–2018	68	5	1	4119	—
Avery John	DF	Trinidad and Tobago	2009	6	0	0	348	—
Eddie Johnson	FW	USA	2014–2015	26	7	3	1957	—
Alhaji Kamara	FW	Sierra Leone	2016–2017	9	1	0	187	—
Ola Kamara	FW	Norway	2019–2022	85	35	6	4890	—
Brian Kamler	MF	USA	1996–1999, 2001	72	3	9	4770	—
Hakim Karamoko	FW	USA	2025–	1	0	0	19	—
Kris Kelderman	MF	USA	1996–1997	42	3	7	1727	—
Dane Kelly	FW	Jamaica	2018	1	0	0	3	—
Taylor Kemp	DF	USA	2013–2018	101	3	14	8599	—
Thabiso Khumalo	MF	South Africa	2008–2010	27	1	3	1096	—
Hosei Kijima	MF	Japan	2025–	41	2	1	1905	—
Stephen King	MF	USA	2010–2012	47	1	2	2685	—
Quavas Kirk	FW	USA	2008	10	1	0	135	—
Perry Kitchen	MF	USA	2011–2015	158	10	10	13924	—
Mateusz Klich	MF	Poland	2023–2024	63	6	22	5390	—
Chris Korb	DF	USA	2011–2017	121	0	11	9752	—
Dema Kovalenko	MF	Ukraine	2003–2005	77	12	14	6620	—
Guy-Roland Kpene	FW	Côte d'Ivoire	2007	15	0	2	626	—
Ted Ku-DiPietro	MF	USA	2022–2024	65	7	7	3273	Homegrown
Nana Kuffour	FW	Ghana	2004–2005	8	1	0	270	—
Keisuke Kurokawa	DF	Japan	2026–	34	0	6	3048	—
Shawn Kuykendall	MF	USA	2005	2	0	0	10	—
Roy Lassiter	FW	USA	1998–1999, 2002	67	36	17	5217	—
Sebastien Le Toux	MF	France	2017	16	2	0	732	—
Randall Leal	MF	Costa Rica	2025	15	0	1	518	—
Thor Lee	DF	USA	1996	2	0	0	134	—
Azaad Liadi	MF	USA	2022	1	0	0	8	—
Mark Lisi	MF	USA	2001–2002	31	4	5	1985	—
Carlos Llamosa	DF	USA	1997–2000	83	3	2	6658	—
Dennis Ludwig	FW	USA	2002	2	0	0	30	—
Lukas MacNaughton	DF	Canada	2025	11	1	0	719	—
John Maessner	MF	USA	1996–1997, 1999–2000	73	7	14	4171	—
Justin Mapp	MF	USA	2002	3	0	0	28	—
Pete Marino	FW	USA	2000	15	4	0	616	—
Nikola Markovic	DF	Canada	2026–	23	0	1	543	—
Jesse Marsch	MF	USA	1996–1997	15	4	3	325	—
Collin Martin	MF	USA	2013–2016	15	0	1	648	Homegrown
Gonzalo Martínez	DF	Colombia	2008	26	1	2	2102	—
Felipe Martins	MF	Brazil	2019–2021	43	1	6	2528	Unwanted
Thiago Martins	FW	Brazil	2003	5	0	0	359	—
Darren Mattocks	FW	Jamaica	2018	25	10	0	1267	—
Chris McCann	DF	Ireland	2019	6	0	0	319	—
Dax McCarty	MF	USA	2011	13	0	2	946	—
Brandon McDonald	DF	Guam	2011–2013	63	3	5	5527	—
Ivan McKinley	DF	South Africa	2002	23	1	2	1786	—
Devon McTavish	DF	USA	2006–2011	83	1	4	6149	—
Christopher McVey	DF	USA	2024	27	1	0	2148	—
Domenic Mediate	MF	USA	2006–2008	26	0	0	1010	—
Shawn Medved	MF	USA	1996	27	3	1	1171	—
Bruno Miranda	FW	Bolivia	2017–2018	12	0	1	139	—
Luke Mishu	DF	USA	2015–2016	9	0	0	610	—
Jason Moore	MF	USA	1999	16	0	2	999	—
Justin Moose	MF	USA	2006–2008	8	0	0	319	—
Joseph Mora	DF	Costa Rica	2018–2021	97	0	4	7232	—
Jaime Moreno	FW	Bolivia	1996–2002, 2004–2010	329	131	102	25275	—
Júnior Moreno	MF	Venezuela	2018–2021	97	1	9	7949	—
Ravel Morrison	MF	Jamaica	2022	14	2	0	869	—
Kurt Morsink	MF	Costa Rica	2010–2012	22	0	0	1715	—
Patrick Mullins	FW	USA	2016–2018	44	13	3	2348	—
Louis Munteanu	FW	Romania	2026–	21	6	4	1468	—
Jacob Murrell	FW	USA	2024–2026	59	3	5	1799	—
Ange N'Silu	FW	Democratic Republic of the Congo	2009	9	1	1	452	—
Andy Najar	MF	Honduras	2010–2012, 2021–2023	152	11	16	11240	Homegrown
Bryan Namoff	DF	USA	2001–2010	195	4	16	16043	—
Lamar Neagle	FW	USA	2016–2017	53	10	6	3066	—
Lewis Neal	MF	England	2012–2014	53	2	3	2107	—
Sean Nealis	DF	USA	2026–	16	0	0	525	—
Ryan Nelsen	DF	New Zealand	2001–2004	81	7	5	6970	—
Joseph Ngwenya	FW	Zimbabwe	2011	16	0	0	629	—
Matt Nickell	FW	USA	2005–2006	7	0	0	44	—
Franco Niell	FW	Argentina	2008	7	0	1	279	—
Kimito Nono	DF	Japan	2026–	16	3	2	1394	—
Patrick Nyarko	MF	Ghana	2016–2017	40	5	10	2856	—
Sainey Nyassi	MF	Gambia	2013	14	0	0	676	—
Moses Nyeman	MF	USA	2019–2022	32	0	3	1434	Homegrown
Lewis O'Brien	MF	England	2023	17	1	1	1515	—
Chris Odoi-Atsem	DF	USA	2017–2022	57	1	0	2617	—
Ben Olsen	MF	USA	1998–2009	221	29	49	17097	—
Curt Onalfo	DF	USA	1998–1999	4	0	0	79	—
Kofi Opare	DF	Ghana	2014–2018	65	3	1	5566	—
Nathan Ordaz	FW	El Salvador	2026–	17	0	1	669	—
José Guillermo Ortiz	FW	Costa Rica	2017	16	1	0	669	—
Antonio Otero	MF	USA	1999–2000	25	0	3	1673	—
Lionard Pajoy	FW	Colombia	2012–2013	32	5	1	2115	—
Victor Pálsson	MF	Iceland	2022–2023	28	0	3	2449	—
Kevin Paredes	MF	USA	2020–2021	41	3	2	2496	Homegrown
Jeff Parke	DF	USA	2014	13	0	0	1162	—
Clint Peay	DF	USA	1996–2000	43	2	2	3114	—
Marquinhos Pedroso	DF	Brazil	2019	4	0	0	287	—
João Peglow	MF	Brazil	2025–	55	4	10	4285	—
Matti Peltola	MF	Finland	2024–	88	1	5	5936	—
Juan Manuel Peña	DF	Bolivia	2010	10	0	0	700	—
Gonzalo Peralta	DF	Argentina	2008	18	1	0	1514	—
Trevor Perea	MF	USA	2003	1	0	0	3	—
Adrien Perez	FW	USA	2021–2022	20	0	2	1002	—
Orlando Perez	DF	USA	2002	8	0	0	268	—
Mike Petke	DF	USA	2003–2005	58	5	0	4997	—
Donovan Pines	DF	USA	2019–2023	87	6	2	6809	Homegrown
Gabriel Pirani	MF	Brazil	2023–2026	78	14	6	4542	—
Chris Pontius	MF	USA	2009–2015	152	31	16	11319	—
Eddie Pope	DF	USA	1996–2002	143	8	8	12228	—
Kyle Porter	MF	Canada	2013–2014	32	3	1	1659	—
Brandon Prideaux	DF	USA	2002–2006	116	0	0	9669	—
Santino Quaranta	MF	USA	2001–2006, 2008–2011	159	24	29	11063	—
Eliseo Quintanilla	FW	El Salvador	2002–2005	27	5	5	1902	—
Rafael	FW	Brazil	2013	7	1	0	331	—
Steve Rammel	FW	USA	1996–1997	37	15	4	2425	—
Milton Reyes	DF	Honduras	2002	24	0	2	2204	—
Yordy Reyna	FW	Peru	2020–2021	23	4	2	1178	—
Barry Rice	DF	USA	2010	2	0	0	86	—
James Riley	DF	USA	2013	21	0	1	1760	—
Gelmin Rivas	FW	Venezuela	2020	13	2	0	501	—
Nigel Robertha	FW	Netherlands	2021–2023	45	6	4	1958	—
Jalen Robinson	DF	USA	2014-2019	26	0	0	1575	Homegrown
Alain Rochat	DF	Switzerland	2013	5	0	0	404	—
J. P. Rodrigues	DF	Guyana	2010	1	0	0	12	—
Lucas Rodríguez	MF	Argentina	2019	33	6	3	2707	—
Martín Rodríguez	MF	Chile	2022–2024	39	2	9	2162	—
Chris Rolfe	MF	USA	2014–2017	61	16	11	4777	—
Wayne Rooney	FW	England	2018–2019	48	23	15	3959	—
Kye Rowles	DF	Australia	2025–	58	1	1	5084	—
Ruan	DF	Brazil	2023	24	0	6	1425	—
Carlos Ruiz	FW	Guatemala	2013	13	0	0	528	—
Robbie Russell	DF	USA	2012–2013	20	1	0	1361	—
Alvaro Saborio	FW	Costa Rica	2015–2016	31	10	3	1669	—
Sergio Salas	FW	Bolivia	2000	1	0	0	18	—
Hamdi Salihi	FW	Albania	2012	22	6	0	945	—
Lloyd Sam	MF	Ghana	2016–2017	43	5	12	2996	—
Gaoussou Samaké	DF	Côte d'Ivoire	2022–2023	8	0	0	473	—
Marcos Sanchez	MF	Panama	2013	9	0	0	508	—
Tony Sanneh	DF	USA	1996–1998	71	14	25	5688	—
Maicon Santos	FW	Brazil	2012	26	7	3	1470	—
Pedro Santos	MF	Portugal	2023–2024	51	4	5	3309	—
Marcelo Saragosa	MF	Brazil	2012–2013	24	1	1	1530	—
Hayden Sargis	DF	USA	2022–2024	3	0	0	45	—
Marcelo Sarvas	MF	Brazil	2016–2017	53	1	3	4088	—
David Schnegg	DF	Austria	2024–2025	34	1	4	2823	—
Michael Seaton	FW	Jamaica	2013–2015	5	0	0	174	Homegrown
Ulises Segura	MF	Costa Rica	2018–2020	66	5	3	3763	—
Brandon Servania	MF	USA	2025–	62	0	5	4254	—
Conor Shanosky	DF	USA	2010–2014	5	0	0	355	Homegrown
Luis Silva	MF	USA	2013–2015	54	15	6	2911	—
Clyde Simms	MF	USA	2005–2011	182	3	7	13184	—
Axel Sjöberg	DF	Sweden	2020	2	0	0	171	—
Drew Skundrich	MF	USA	2021–2022	39	0	3	2029	—
Mike Slivinski	MF	USA	1998–2000	22	0	1	347	—
Brad Smith	DF	Australia	2022	16	0	1	1152	—
Kimarni Smith	FW	England	2021–2022	20	1	3	445	—
Diego Sonora	MF	Argentina	1999	27	1	5	2201	—
Erik Sorga	FW	Estonia	2020–2021	21	1	0	917	—
Robert Ssejjemba	FW	Uganda	2006	1	0	0	25	—
Earnie Stewart	MF	USA	2003–2004	47	4	6	4016	—
Zoltan Stieber	MF	Hungary	2017–2019	44	6	8	2660	—
Hristo Stoichkov	FW	Bulgaria	2003	21	5	5	897	—
David Stokes	DF	USA	2003–2006	24	0	1	848	—
Dan Stratford	MF	England	2008	5	0	0	81	—
Jared Stroud	MF	USA	2024–	87	4	11	4582	—
Berthy Suarez	FW	Bolivia	1996	2	0	0	160	—
Danny Szetela	MF	USA	2009	4	0	0	97	—
Carey Talley	DF	USA	1998–2001, 2010	124	10	10	8848	—
Long Tan	FW	China	2012	6	1	0	231	—
Joey Thieman	MF	USA	1997	3	0	0	58	—
Craig Thompson	MF	USA	2008	6	0	0	241	—
Jason Thompson	FW	USA	2004–2005	2	0	0	61	—
John Thorrington	MF	USA	2013	14	0	1	1052	—
Maxim Tissot	DF	Canada	2017	1	0	0	90	—
Casey Townsend	FW	USA	2013	9	0	0	316	—
Garrison Tubbs	DF	USA	2024–	23	0	0	1116	—
Gavin Turner	MF	USA	2025–	4	0	0	67	Homegrown
Greg Vanney	DF	USA	2007	15	0	0	1261	—
Carlos Varela	MF	Spain	2010	6	0	0	173	—
David Vaudreuil	DF	USA	1996–1997	39	0	3	2937	—
Lawson Vaughn	DF	USA	2009	3	0	0	225	—
Scott Vermillion	DF	USA	2001	12	0	1	953	—
Joe Vide	MF	USA	2008	8	1	0	590	—
Petter Villegas	MF	Puerto Rico	2002	18	2	5	1346	—
Rob Vincent	MF	England	2016–2017	22	2	0	1203	—
Jamil Walker	MF	USA	2005–2007	41	3	8	1135	—
Rodney Wallace	DF	Costa Rica	2009–2010	39	3	5	3189	—
Akeem Ward	DF	USA	2019	1	0	0	48	—
Mark Watson	DF	Canada	2001	11	0	2	923	—
Roy Wegerle	FW	USA	1997–1998	22	5	3	1388	—
Sterling Wescott	MF	USA	1996	2	0	0	102	—
Ethan White	DF	USA	2011–2013	38	1	0	3027	Homegrown
Derrick Williams	DF	Ireland	2023	24	1	0	1847	—
Richie Williams	MF	USA	1996–2000, 2002	169	8	29	14597	—
John Wilson	DF	USA	2005–2007	28	0	2	1502	—
Josh Wolff	FW	USA	2011–2012	39	5	8	2147	—
A. J. Wood	FW	USA	1998–2001	74	14	9	3218	—
Daniel Woolard	DF	USA	2011–2013	73	2	3	6243	—
Lyle Yorks	MF	USA	1998	1	0	0	4	—
Griffin Yow	MF	USA	2019–2022	31	3	2	951	Homegrown
Mike Zaher	DF	USA	2008	3	0	0	124	—
Henry Zambrano	FW	Colombia	2002	5	1	0	240	—
Abdoul Zanne	FW	Côte d'Ivoire	2022	1	0	0	3	—
Jed Zayner	DF	USA	2010–2011	13	0	1	1109	—
Craig Ziadie	DF	Jamaica	2001–2002	19	0	3	1334	—
Rida Zouhir	MF	Canada	2025	15	0	2	325	—

=== Goalkeepers ===
Name	Country	Years	Games	Conceded	Shutouts	Minutes	Notes
Mike Ammann	USA	2001	19	38	1	1739	—
Luis Barraza	USA	2025	24	39	4	2091	—
Clint Baumstark	USA	2003	1	1	0	100	—
Alex Bono	USA	2023–2024, 2026–	41	71	7	3645	—
José Carvallo	Peru	2008	1	4	0	90	—
Jeff Causey	USA	1996–1997	25	46	1	2071	—
Steve Clark	USA	2017–2018	8	17	2	720	—
Louis Crayton	Liberia	2008–2009	18	27	5	1620	—
Steve Cronin	USA	2009, 2011	4	6	1	306	—
Andrew Dykstra	USA	2013–2016	14	23	2	1228	—
Jordan Farr	USA	2025–	4	9	0	337	—
Scott Garlick	USA	1997–1998	39	57	9	3376	—
Bill Hamid	USA	2010–2017, 2018–2022	278	358	80	24746	Homegrown
Sean Johnson	USA	2026–	31	55	6	2790	—
Jon Kempin	USA	2021–2022	12	22	1	1063	—
Kim Joon Hong	South Korea	2025–2026	8	19	1	720	—
Miloš Kočić	Serbia	2009	4	8	0	308	—
Paul Marcoullier	USA	2000	1	0	0	2	—
Tyler Miller	USA	2023–2024	30	53	6	2655	—
Jay Nolly	USA	2007	1	2	0	90	—
David Ochoa	Mexico	2022	9	17	2	810	—
Pat Onstad	Canada	2011	3	7	0	270	—
David Ousted	Denmark	2018	17	32	0	1530	—
Troy Perkins	USA	2004–2007, 2010	99	131	24	8910	—
Tom Presthus	USA	1997–2000	59	97	5	5092	—
Nick Rimando	USA	2002–2006	98	121	29	8956	—
Rafael Romo	Venezuela	2022	14	34	1	1211	—
Chris Seitz	USA	2019–2021	11	19	2	990	—
Mark Simpson	USA	1996–2001	53	75	9	4531	—
Doug Warren	USA	2003–2004	6	9	0	494	—
Zach Wells	USA	2008	17	28	1	1530	—
Josh Wicks	USA	2009	19	26	5	1672	—
Joe Willis	USA	2011–2014	23	43	4	2052	—
Travis Worra	USA	2015–2018	19	32	4	1652	—

=== Nationality ===
Country	Number of players
Albania	1
Argentina	18
Australia	3
Austria	1
Belgium	1
Bolivia	6
Bosnia and Herzegovina	1
Brazil	14
Bulgaria	2
Cameroon	1
Canada	10
Chile	2
China	1
Colombia	4
Costa Rica	8
Côte d'Ivoire	3
Democratic Republic of the Congo	1
Denmark	1
Ecuador	1
El Salvador	6
England	9
Estonia	1
Finland	2
France	3
Gambia	1
Germany	2
Ghana	7
Greece	1
Guam	1
Guatemala	2
Guyana	1
Honduras	4
Hungary	1
Iceland	1
Iraq	1
Ireland	2
Israel	1
Jamaica	9
Japan	3
Liberia	2
Mexico	4
Montenegro	1
Netherlands	1
New Zealand	1
Nigeria	2
Norway	1
Panama	3
Peru	4
Poland	1
Portugal	1
Puerto Rico	1
Romania	1
Russia	1
Senegal	1
Serbia	1
Sierra Leone	2
South Africa	3
South Korea	1
Spain	3
St. Vincent and the Grenadines	1
Sweden	1
Switzerland	3
Trinidad and Tobago	2
Uganda	1
Ukraine	1
Uruguay	1
USA	192
Venezuela	3
Zimbabwe	1

== Club captains ==
This is a list of people who wore the captain's armband the most times.

Dates	Name	Notes
1996–1998	(United States) John Harkes	—
1999–2003	(Bolivia) Marco Etcheverry	—
2004	(New Zealand) Ryan Nelsen	—
2005–2009	(Bolivia) Jaime Moreno	—
2010	(United States) Santino Quaranta	—
2011–2013	(Canada) Dwayne De Rosario	—
2014–2016	(United States) Bobby Boswell	—
2017–2018	(United States) Steve Birnbaum	—
2018–2019	(England) Wayne Rooney	—
2020–2024	(United States) Steve Birnbaum	—
2024–2025	(Belgium) Christian Benteke	—
2026–	(United States) Lucas Bartlett	—
