= Juan Gómez =

Juan Gómez or Gomez may refer to:

== Academics ==
- Juan Gómez de Mora (1586–1648), Spanish architect who helped construct the town of Simancas
- Juan Gómez-Quiñones (1940–2020), American historian, poet and activist

== Artists and Entertainers ==
- Juan Gómez-Jurado (born 1977), Spanish journalist
- Juan Gómez, bassplayer for the band Opal

== Politicians ==
- Chief Gómez (fl. 1840–1850), a Mescalero Apache chieftain
- Juan José Gómez Camacho (born 1964), Mexican diplomat, Permanent Representative to the United Nations in New York
- Juan Gualberto Gómez (1854–1933), Afro-Cuban revolutionary leader, writer and Cuban Representative and Senator
- Juan Vicente Gómez (1857–1935), president of Venezuela on three occasions between 1908 and 1935

== Sportspeople ==
=== Association football ===
- Juan Gómez González (1954–1992), Spanish football forward
- Juan Gómez (footballer, born 1971), Argentine football defender
- Juan Augusto Gómez (born 1976), Argentine-Mexican football manager and former midfielder
- Juan Gómez (footballer, 1924-2009), Mexican football midfielder
- Juan José Gómez (born 1980), Salvadoran football goalkeeper
- Juan Pablo Gómez (born 1991), Argentine football right-back
- Juan Gómez (footballer, born 1992), Chilean football centre-back

=== Other sports ===
- Juan Carlos Gómez (rower) (1932–2021), Argentine rower
- Juan Carlos Gómez (born 1973), Cuban boxer
- Juan Felipe Gomez (born 1977), Colombian racquetball player
- Juan Gomez (rugby union) (born 1984), Argentine rugby union player
- Juan Sebastián Gómez (born 1992), Colombian tennis player who was the top ranking male junior player for 2010
- Juan Gómez (boxer), Puerto Rican boxer, see Boxing at the 1993 Central American and Caribbean Games
