= Municipal Mejillones =

Chilean football club

- Full name: Club Deportivo Municipal Mejillones SADP
- Nicknames: Los del Megapuerto, Los Bombarderos del Pacifico, La Furia Celeste, Meji
- Founded: April 7, 2005
- Ground: Municipal de Mejillones; Mejillones, Chile
- Capacity: 1,500
- Chairman: Manuel Ibacache
- Manager: Jaime Carreño
- League: Segunda División
Home colours	Away colours

Club Deportivo Municipal Mejillones SADP is a Chilean Football club, their home town is the commune of Mejillones, Chile. They currently play in the fourth level of Chilean football, the Tercera División.

The club were founded on April 7, 2005 and played seven seasons in the Tercera División and one season in the Segunda División.

== Seasons played ==
- 1 season in Segunda División
- 7 seasons in Tercera División

== Current squad ==
Note: Flags indicate national team as defined under FIFA eligibility rules; some limited exceptions apply. Players may hold more than one non-FIFA nationality.

No.	Pos.	Nation	Player
1	GK	CHI	Ricardo Camus
2	DF	CHI	Jorge Moraga
3	DF	CHI	Alberto Gatica
4	MF	CHI	Angelo Boudon
6	MF	CHI	José Carlos Prieto
7	MF	CHI	Jose Pizarro
8	DF	CHI	Matías Fabres
9	FW	CHI	Dinko Araya
10	MF	CHI	Abel Valenzuela
11	FW	CHI	Fabian Mondaca
12	GK	CHI	Jordan Quijanes
13	FW	CHI	Leandro Ñirril

No.	Pos.	Nation	Player
14	MF	CHI	Jair Jimenez
15	DF	CHI	Sebastián Pizarro
16	MF	CHI	Jose Durán
17	DF	CHI	Luis Barraza
18	MF	CHI	Emerson Jorquera
19	MF	CHI	Juan Medina
20	MF	CHI	Gustavo Geraldo
21	FW	CHI	Felipe Manosalva
22	MF	CHI	José Barraza
23	MF	CHI	Rodrigo Gaete
24	MF	CHI	Marco Contreras
25	GK	CHI	Renato Huerta

== Titles ==
None

== See also ==
- Chilean football league system
