= Kim Jun-hong =

Kim Jun-hong may refer to:

- Kim Jun-hong (footballer) (born 2003), South Korean footballer
- Kim Seo-jun (sport shooter) (born 1990 as Kim Jun-hong), South Korean sport shooter
