= Rodrigo Gaete =

Chilean footballer (born 1991)

Personal information
- Full name: Rodrigo Andrés Gaete Valenzuela
- Date of birth: 21 January 1991 (age 35)
- Place of birth: Iquique, Chile
- Height: 1.73 m (5 ft 8 in)
- Position: Central midfielder

Senior career*
Years	Team	Apps	(Gls)
2012–2014	Deportes Iquique	36	(0)
2014–2016	Municipal Mejillones	49	(0)
- * Club domestic league appearances and goals

Rodrigo Andrés Gaete Valenzuela (Spanish pronunciation: [roˈðriɣo anˈdɾes ɣaˈete], born 21 January 1991) is a Chilean footballer who plays as a central midfielder.
