= 2025 D.C. United season =

D.C. United 2025 soccer season

D.C. United
2025 season
- General manager: Ally Mackay
- Head coach: Troy Lesesne (until July 10); Kevin Flanagan (interim, from July 11 until August 16); René Weiler (from August 16)
- Stadium: Audi Field
- MLS: Conference: 15th Overall: 30th
- MLS Cup playoffs: Did not qualify
- U.S. Open Cup: Quarterfinals
- Top goalscorer: League: Christian Benteke (9); All: Christian Benteke (9)
- Highest home attendance: 19,365 v Toronto FC; February 22 (MLS)
- Lowest home attendance: 10,645 v New England Revolution; May 28 (MLS)
- Average home league attendance: 16,389
- Biggest win: 2–0 v Charleston Battery (Home, May 6, U.S. Open Cup)
- Biggest defeat: 1–7 v Chicago Fire FC (Home, June 7, MLS)
Home colors	Away colors	Third colors

The 2025 season was D.C. United's 30th in existence and its 30th consecutive season in the top division of American soccer, Major League Soccer. The team participated in the U.S. Open Cup in addition to MLS play.

The 2025 was poor season for United, who for the second time in four years, finished at the very bottom of the MLS table. This caused the club to miss the MLS Cup playoffs for the sixth season in a row, extended the club's record for playoff drought. The poor performance caused head coach, Troy Lesesne to be sacked midway through the regular season and general manager, Ally Mackay, to be fired at the season's end. Nevertheless, fans and the media put less blame on Lesesne and Mackay and instead aimed more blamed at club ownership, specifically Jason Levien and Steven Kaplan, who, under their ownership, have seen the team earn four last-place finishes and only one major trophy won.

Despite woes in MLS play, United did have their deepest run in the U.S. Open Cup since the 2013 championship run; United reached the quarterfinals of the U.S. Open Cup before losing to eventual Open Cup, champions, Nashville SC. Outside of these two competitions, United did not participate in any continental tournaments.

== Background ==
The 2024 D.C. United season saw the arrival of Ally Mackay as general manager following the dismissal of Dave Kasper, and Troy Lesesne as head coach following the sacking of Wayne Rooney. Entering the season, expectations among the media were low among the club, and most expected the team to finish at the bottom of the table, and possibly win the Wooden Spoon. The club vastly improved their attack thanks to a Golden Boot-winning season by Christian Benteke as well as acquisitions of players such as Aaron Herrera, Jared Stroud, and Lucas Bartlett. However, the club let in a record 70 goals, the third worst in the league, which offset the 52 goals they scored during the season.

Benteke and Herrera nevertheless were named All-Stars and the former won the MLS Golden Boot, becoming the first D.C. United player to win the boot since Dwayne De Rosario did so in 2011.

== Club ==
=== Front office ===
Position	Name
Chairman and Majority Owner	(United States) Jason Levien
Co-chairman	(United States) Stephen Kaplan
Minority Owners	(United States) Mark Ingram II (United States) Mario Mims (United States) Devin Talbott
President, Business Ops	(United States) Danita Johnson
Chief Financial Officer	(United States) Dan Franceschini

=== Technical staff ===
Position	Name
General Manager	(Scotland) Ally Mackay
Assistant GM	(United States) Caleb Shreve
Director of Player Personnel	(Haiti) Clarens Cheridieu
Head coach	(Switzerland) René Weiler
Assistant coach	(Uruguay) Alex Martínez
Goalkeeping coach	(United States) Cody Mizell

Last updated: June 23, 2025
Source: D.C. United

=== First-team roster ===
Squad No.	Name	Nationality	Position(s)	Date of birth (age)	Apps	Goals	Assists	Signed from
Goalkeepers
1	Kim Joon-hong	(South Korea)	GK	June 3, 2003 (age 23)	11	0	0	(South Korea) Jeonbuk Hyundai Motors
13	Luis Barraza	(United States)	GK	November 8, 1996 (age 29)	24	0	0	(United States) New York City FC
24	Jordan Farr	(United States)	GK	October 5, 1994 (age 32)	4	0	0	(United States) Tampa Bay Rowdies
Defenders
3	Lucas Bartlett	(United States)	CB	July 26, 1997 (age 29)	67	2	3	(United States) St. Louis City SC
4	Matti Peltola	(Finland)	CB / DM	July 3, 2002 (age 24)	63	0	1	(Finland) HJK Helsinki
5	Lukas MacNaughton	(Canada)	CB	March 8, 1995 (age 31)	11	1	0	(United States) Nashville SC
12	Conner Antley	(United States)	RB / CB	March 22, 1995 (age 31)	27	1	2	(United States) Tampa Bay Rowdies
15	Kye Rowles	(Australia)	CB	June 24, 1998 (age 28)	34	0	0	(Scotland) Heart of Midlothian
16	Garrison Tubbs	(United States)	CB	February 17, 2002 (age 24)	26	1	1	(United States) Atlanta United FC
18	Derek Dodson	(United States)	RB	November 3, 1998 (age 27)	15	0	2	(United States) Minnesota United
22	Aaron Herrera	(Guatemala)	RB	June 6, 1997 (age 29)	62	1	8	(Canada) CF Montréal
28	David Schnegg	(Austria)	LB	September 29, 1998 (age 28)	40	2	1	(Austria) Sturm Graz
Midfielders
5	Boris Enow	(Cameroon)	CM	March 30, 2000 (age 26)	40	1	1	(Israel) Maccabi Netanya
8	Jared Stroud	(United States)	LW / RW	July 10, 1996 (age 30)	68	6	9	(United States) St. Louis City SC
10	Gabriel Pirani	(Brazil)	AM	April 12, 2002 (age 24)	75	15	4	(Brazil) Santos
11	Randall Leal	(Costa Rica)	RM	January 14, 1997 (age 29)	18	0	4	(United States) Nashville SC
23	Brandon Servania	(United States)	CM	March 12, 1999 (age 27)	33	0	3	(Canada) Toronto FC
25	Jackson Hopkins	(United States)	AM / SS	July 1, 2004 (age 22)	72	4	1	(United States) D.C. United Academy
30	Caden Clark	(United States)	AM	May 27, 2003 (age 23)	4	0	0	(Canada) CF Montréal
44	Rida Zouhir	(Canada)	CM	November 23, 2003 (age 22)	16	0	0	(Canada) CF Montréal
48	Gavin Turner	(United States)	AM / LW	January 5, 2007 (age 19)	1	0	0	(United States) D.C. United Academy
77	Hosei Kijima	(Japan)	CM	July 1, 2002 (age 24)	31	2	0	(United States) San Diego FC
Forwards
7	Peglow	(Brazil)	LW / RW	January 7, 2002 (age 24)	26	3	4	(Poland) Radomiak Radom
17	Jacob Murrell	(United States)	FW	March 29, 2004 (age 22)	51	3	3	(United States) Georgetown Hoyas
19	Hakim Karamoko	(United States)	FW	November 1, 2005 (age 20)	2	0	0	(United States) NC State Wolfpack
20	Christian Benteke	(Belgium)	ST	December 3, 1990 (age 35)	100	49	11	(England) Crystal Palace
23	Dominique Badji	(Senegal)	CF	October 16, 1992 (age 34)	33	2	1	(Turkey) Bandirmaspor
27	Kristian Fletcher	(United States)	FW	October 16, 2004 (age 22)	32	2	1	(United States) Loudoun United

== Transfers ==
=== MLS SuperDraft picks ===
2025 D.C. United SuperDraft Picks
Round	Selection	Player	Position	College	Status
1	10	(United States) Hakim Karamoko	FW	NC State	Signed with first team
2	40	(United States) Daniel Ittycheria	FW	Princeton	Returned to school
3	70	(United States) Jonah Biggar	DF	South Carolina	Returned to school
3	86	(United States) Grant Bailey	DF	Loyola (Chicago)	Returned to school

=== Transfers in ===
Date	Position	No.	Name	From	Fee/notes	Ref.
November 20, 2024	GK	24	(United States) Jordan Farr	(United States) Tampa Bay Rowdies		
December 9, 2024	GK	13	(United States) Luis Barraza	(United States) New York City FC	$50,000 GAM + incentives	
December 12, 2024	MF	77	(Japan) Hosei Kijima	(United States) San Diego FC (Note: Kijima last played for St. Louis City SC but was selected by San Diego FC in the 2024 MLS Expansion Draft before being traded to D.C. United.)	$400,000 GAM	
December 16, 2024	MF	7	(Brazil) Peglow	(Poland) Radomiak Radom	Signed through 2027, 2028 team option	
December 18, 2024	DF	5	(Canada) Lukas MacNaughton	(United States) Nashville SC	$150,000 GAM + incentives	
December 20, 2024	DF	18	(United States) Derek Dodson	(United States) Minnesota United	2024 MLS Re-Entry Draft	
January 8, 2025	FW	19	(United States) Hakim Karamoko	(United States) NC State Wolfpack	2025 MLS SuperDraft	
January 9, 2025	GK	1	(South Korea) Kim Joon-hong	(South Korea) Jeonbuk Hyundai Motors	Signed through 2027, 2028 Team Option	
January 14, 2025	MF	11	(Costa Rica) Randall Leal	(United States) Nashville SC	Claimed off waivers, 2026 Team Option	
January 15, 2025	DF	15	(Australia) Kye Rowles	(Scotland) Heart of Midlothian		
February 11, 2025	MF	23	(United States) Brandon Servania	(Canada) Toronto FC		
February 21, 2025	MF	48	(United States) Gavin Turner	(United States) D.C. United Academy	Homegrown Player, signed through 2027 with Team Options in 2028-29	
February 21, 2025	MF	44	(Canada) Rida Zouhir	(Canada) CF Montréal	One-year deal, Team Options in 2026-27	
August 21, 2025	MF	30	(United States) Caden Clark	(Canada) CF Montréal	U-22 Initiative $700K to Montreal (plus $100K in incentives and sell-on percentage); Signed for 2025 with Team Options in 2026-27	
October 16, 2025	FW		(United States) Oscar Avilez	(United States) D.C. United Academy	Homegrown Player, signed through 2028 with Team Options in 2029-30	

=== Transfers out ===
==== Winter ====
===== First team =====
Date	Position	No.	Name	To	Fee/notes	Ref.
October 25, 2024	GK	1	(United States) Tyler Miller	(England) Notts County	Released (Note: Contract option for the 2025 season was declined.)	
October 25, 2024	FW	11	(Colombia) Cristian Dájome	(Mexico) Santos Laguna	Released	
October 25, 2024	MF	14	(Chile) Martín Rodríguez	(Chile) Ñublense	Released	
October 25, 2024	MF	18	(El Salvador) Jeremy Garay	(United States) Loudoun United FC	Released	
October 25, 2024	GK	24	(United States) Alex Bono	(United States) New England Revolution	Released	
October 25, 2024	GK	26	(United States) Nathan Crockford	(United States) FC Cincinnati 2	Released	
October 25, 2024	DF	30	(United States) Hayden Sargis	(United States) Orlando City B	Released	
October 25, 2024	GK	50	(United States) Luis Zamudio	(United States) Charleston Battery	Released	
October 25, 2024	DF	97	(Sweden) Christopher McVey	(United States) San Diego FC	Released	
December 20, 2024	MF	43	(Poland) Mateusz Klich	(United States) Atlanta United	Trade	
December 31, 2024	MF	6	(United States) Russell Canouse	Retired	Free (Note: Contract expired, player became free agent.)	
December 31, 2024	MF	7	(Portugal) Pedro Santos	(United States) Loudoun United FC	Free	
January 3, 2025	DF	45	(United States) Matai Akinmboni	(England) AFC Bournemouth	Undisclosed fee (est. $1.25M-2.5M)	
February 10, 2025	MF	21	(United States) Ted Ku-DiPietro	(United States) Colorado Rapids	$1.125M cash, $275K future incentives Future sell-on/trade percentage clause.	

===== Summer =====
Date	Position	Name	To	Fee/notes	Ref.
June 30, 2025	MF	(Ethiopia) Michael Dessalegn	(United States) Old Dominion Monarchs	Signed NLI	
June 30, 2025	MF	(Tunisia) Teymour Mohammed	(France) Montpellier HSC	Free	
July 1, 2025	MF	(Philippines) Otu Bisong	(United States) Virginia Cavaliers	Signed NLI	
July 1, 2025	MF	(Bulgaria) Gleb Bogdanov	(United States) Villanova Wildcats	Signed NLI	
July 1, 2025	GK	(United States) Ethan Pendleton	(United States) UCLA Bruins	Signed NLI	
July 15, 2025	GK	(United States) Alexander Aguilar	(United States) Old Dominion Monarchs	Signed NLI	
July 15, 2025	MF	(Honduras) Alessandro Maldonado	(United States) Old Dominion Monarchs	Signed NLI	

=== Loans in ===
Date	Pos.	Player	From	Date until	Ref.
February 26, 2025	FW	(Mexico) Fidel Barajas	(Mexico) Guadalajara	June 30, 2025	

=== Loans out ===
Date	Pos.	Player	To	Date until	Ref.
August 30, 2024	FW	(United States) Kristian Fletcher	(England) Nottingham Forest	April 22, 2025	
May 30, 2025	FW	(United States) Hakim Karamoko	(United States) Loudoun United	December 30, 2025	
July 1, 2025	MF	(United States) Gavin Turner	(United States) Chattanooga FC	December 30, 2025	

Transfer notes

== Preseason and friendlies ==
January 25	D.C. United	1–1	New York Red Bulls	Bradenton, Florida
10:00 AM EST				Stadium: IMG Academy

February 1	Charleston Battery	1–2	D.C. United	Palm Beach Gardens, Florida
11:00 AM EST	Torres 51'		Peglow 7'; Pirani 21'	Stadium: The Gardens North County District Park

February 7	Colorado Rapids	1–1	D.C. United	Palm Beach Gardens, Florida
11:00 AM EST	Stewart-Baynes 70'		77'	Stadium: The Gardens North County District Park

February 12	D.C. United	1–1	Nashville SC	Palm Beach Gardens, Florida
11:00 AM EST				Stadium: The Gardens North County District Park

February 15	D.C. United	3–1	Houston Dynamo	TBD
11:00 AM EST				Stadium: TBD

August 2	D.C. United (United States)	0–3	Ethiopia	Washington, D.C.
5:00 PM EDT		Report	Markneh 22'; Hotessa 61'; Youssuf 67'	Stadium: Audi Field

September 6	D.C. United (United States)	3–1	(Mexico) América	Washington, D.C.
6:30 PM EDT	Peglow 47'; Clark 54'; Pirani 90+3'	Report	MacNaughton 53' (o.g.)	Stadium: Audi Field; Referee: Sergii Demianchuk

== Competitions ==
=== Major League Soccer ===
==== Standings ====
===== Eastern Conference =====
MLS Eastern Conference table (2025)
Pos	Team	Pld	W	L	T	GF	GA	GD	Pts
11	New England Revolution	34	9	16	9	44	51	−7	36
12	Toronto FC	34	6	14	14	37	44	−7	32
13	CF Montréal	34	6	18	10	34	60	−26	28
14	Atlanta United FC	34	5	16	13	38	63	−25	28
15	D.C. United	34	5	18	11	30	66	−36	26

Source: MLS
Rules for classification: 1) points; 2) total wins; 3) total goal differential; 4) total goals scored; 5) fewer disciplinary points; 6) away goal differential; 7) away goals scored; 8) home goals differential; 9) home goals scored; 10) coin toss (2 clubs tied) or drawing of lots (≥3 clubs tied)

===== Overall table =====
Overall MLS standings table (2025)
Pos	Team	Pld	W	L	T	GF	GA	GD	Pts	Qualification
26	LA Galaxy	34	7	18	9	46	66	−20	30	Qualification for the CONCACAF Champions Cup round one (Note: As third place of Leagues Cup)
27	Sporting Kansas City	34	7	20	7	46	70	−24	28	
28	CF Montréal	34	6	18	10	34	60	−26	28	
29	Atlanta United FC	34	5	16	13	38	63	−25	28	
30	D.C. United	34	5	18	11	30	66	−36	26	

Source: MLS
Rules for classification: 1) points; 2) total wins; 3) total goal differential; 4) total goals scored; 5) fewer disciplinary points; 6) away goal differential; 7) away goals scored; 8) home goals differential; 9) home goals scored; 10) coin toss (2 clubs tied) or drawing of lots (≥3 clubs tied)

==== Results summary ====
Overall								Home						Away					
Pld	W	D	L	GF	GA	GD	Pts	W	D	L	GF	GA	GD	W	D	L	GF	GA	GD
34	5	11	18	30	66	−36	26	2	7	8	13	31	−18	3	4	10	17	35	−18

Last updated: October 18, 2025.
Source: MLS

==== Match results ====
February 22 1	D.C. United	2–2	Toronto FC	Washington, D.C.
7:30 PM EST	Enow 8'; Benteke 35', (yellow card) 90+4'; Rowles (yellow card) 90+2'	Report	Long (yellow card) 17'; Osorio 28'; Rosted (yellow card) 60'; Bernardeschi 70' (pen.); Flores (yellow card) 78'	Stadium: Audi Field; Attendance: 16,655; Referee: Sergii Boiko

March 1 2	Chicago Fire FC	2–2	D.C. United	Chicago, Illinois
8:30 PM EST	Cuypers 30', 71'; Rogers (yellow card) 90'	Report	Benteke 4'; Rowles (yellow card) 42'; Herrera (yellow card) 50'; Schnegg (yellow card) 90+3'; Murrell 90+6'	Stadium: Soldier Field; Attendance: 20,372; Referee: Marcos de Olivera

March 8 3	D.C. United	2–1	Sporting Kansas City	Washington, D.C.
7:30 PM EST	Enow (yellow card) 31'; Peglow (yellow card) 38'; Benteke 60' (pen.), (yellow card) 76'; Kijima 68'; Kim Joon-Hong (yellow card) 90'; MacNaughton (yellow card) 90+8'; Herrera (yellow card) 90+9'	Report	Rosero (yellow card) 21'; Fernández (yellow card) 40'; Miller (yellow card) 52'; Thommy 53'; Pulskamp (yellow card) 82'	Stadium: Audi Field; Attendance: 15,183; Referee: Rosendo Mendoza

March 15 4	D.C. United	0–0	CF Montréal	Washington, D.C.
7:30 PM EDT	Herrera (yellow card) 12'; Rowles (yellow card) 45+1'; Schnegg (yellow card) 67'	Report	Herbers (yellow card) 19'; Sealy (yellow card) 33'; Clark (yellow card) 68'; Waterman (yellow card) 71'; Saliba (yellow card) 90+2'	Stadium: Audi Field; Attendance: 16,133; Referee: Guido Gonzales Jr.

March 22 5	Orlando City SC	4–1	D.C. United	Orlando, Florida
7:30 PM EDT	Muriel 21'; Ojeda 44'; Freeman 50'; Pašalić 56'; Otero (yellow card) 67'; Angulo (yellow card) 72'	Report	MacNaughton 90+1'	Stadium: Inter&Co Stadium; Attendance: 19,817; Referee: Tori Penso

March 29 6	D.C. United	1–2	Columbus Crew	Washington, D.C.
7:30 PM EDT	Benteke 13'; Bartlett (yellow card) 31'; Schnegg (yellow card) 34'; Dodson (yellow card) 71'; Peglow (yellow card) 77'	Report	Russell-Rowe (yellow card) 35'; Rossi 16', 65'	Stadium: Audi Field; Attendance: 17,048; Referee: Chris Penso

April 6 7	San Jose Earthquakes	6–1	D.C. United	San Jose, California
5:00 PM EDT	Arango 8'; Martínez 16', 81', 90+2'; Espinoza 20' (pen.); Romney (yellow card) 59'; Costa (yellow card) 70'; Pellegrino 90'	Report	Benteke (yellow card) 18', (goal) 45+2'; Bartlett (yellow card) 72'	Stadium: PayPal Park; Attendance: 14,196; Referee: Victor Rivas

April 12 8	D.C. United	0–1	FC Cincinnati	Washington, D.C.
7:30 PM EDT	MacNaughton (yellow card) 25'; Rowles (yellow card) 41'; Schnegg (yellow card) 69'	Report	Valenzuela 28'; Engel (yellow card) 50'	Stadium: Audi Field; Attendance: 16,152; Referee: Ismir Pekmic

April 19 9	New York Red Bulls	1–2	D.C. United	Harrison, New Jersey
7:30 PM EDT	Choupo-Moting 57'; Hack (yellow card) 88'	Report	Peglow 35', 44'; Herrera (yellow card) 70'; Barraza (yellow card) 81'; Badji (yellow card) 88'	Stadium: Sports Illustrated Stadium; Attendance: 18,407; Referee: Sergii Boiko

April 26 10	Philadelphia Union	3–0	D.C. United	Chester, Pennsylvania
4:30 PM EDT	Glesnes (yellow card) 7', (goal) 15'; Westfield (yellow card) 34'; Jean Jacques 52', (yellow card) 90+6'; Damiani 77'	Report	Rowles (yellow card) 4'; Karamoko (yellow card) 72'; Barraza (yellow card) 77'	Stadium: Subaru Park; Attendance: 18,626; Referee: Rubiel Vazquez

May 3 11	D.C. United	2–1	Colorado Rapids	Washington, D.C.
7:30 PM EDT	Benteke 45+4'; Kijima 45+7'; Peltola (yellow card) 50'; Tubbs (yellow card) 55'; Servania (yellow card) 63'; Enow (yellow card) 87'	Report	Yapi 43'; Frederick (yellow card) 80'; Cannon (yellow card) 86'	Stadium: Audi Field; Attendance: 17,661; Referee: Jon Freemon

May 10 12	Toronto FC	2–0	D.C. United	Toronto, Ontario
4:30 PM EDT	Insigne 49'; Bartlett 66' (o.g.); Dominguez (yellow card) 90+1'	Report		Stadium: BMO Field; Attendance: 20,236; Referee: Marcos de Oliveira

May 14 13	D.C. United	0–0	New York City FC	Washington, D.C.
7:30 PM EDT	Rowles (yellow card) 23'; Enow (yellow card) 34'; Tubbs (yellow card) 87'	Report	Perea (yellow card) 57'	Stadium: Audi Field; Attendance: 14,283; Referee: Armando Villarreal

May 17 14	Nashville SC	0–0	D.C. United	Nashville, Tennessee
8:30 PM EDT	Yazbek (yellow card) 30'; Surridge (yellow card) 80'	Report	Peltola (yellow card) 24'; Barraza (yellow card) 70'	Stadium: Geodis Park; Attendance: 25,110; Referee: Sergii Demianchuk

May 24 15	D.C. United	0–2	New York Red Bulls	Washington, D.C.
7:30 PM EDT	Schnegg (yellow card) 37'; Pirani (yellow card) 77'	Report	Harper 42', (yellow card) 82'; P. Stroud (yellow card) 45'; Choupo-Moting (yellow card) 84'; Sofo (yellow card) 85', (goal) 90+5'	Stadium: Audi Field; Attendance: 19,290; Referee: Malik Badawi

May 28 16	D.C. United	1–1	New England Revolution	Washington, D.C.
7:30 PM EDT	Herrera (yellow card) 40'; Pirani 90+1'; Rowles (yellow card) 90+2'; Enow (yellow card) 90+3'	Report	Polster (yellow card) 23'; Feingold 45+3'; Fofana (yellow card) 84'	Stadium: Audi Field; Attendance: 10,645; Referee: Pierre-Luc Lauziere

May 31 17	FC Cincinnati	1–2	D.C. United	Cincinnati, Ohio
7:30 PM EDT	Denkey 15'; Miazga (yellow card) 45+4'	Report	Pirani 2'; Antley 19'; Peltola (yellow card) 44'; Murrell (yellow card) 45+4'; Servania (yellow card) 69'; Badji (yellow card) 90+4'; Zouhir (yellow card) 90+5'	Stadium: TQL Stadium; Attendance: 25,513; Referee: Alexis Da Silva

June 7 18	D.C. United	1–7	Chicago Fire FC	Washington, D.C.
7:30 PM EDT	Tubbs (yellow card) 8'; Badji 60'	Report	Haile-Selassie 8'; Bamba 24', (yellow card) 45+1'; Barlow 30', 44', 65'; Zinckernagel 56', (yellow card) 85'; Acosta (yellow card) 72'; Gutiérrez 90+1'	Stadium: Audi Field; Attendance: 16,715; Referee: Lorenzo Hernandez

June 14 19	Real Salt Lake	2–0	D.C. United	Sandy, Utah
9:30 PM EDT	Russell 23'; Agada (yellow card) 48'; Katranis (yellow card) 62'; Vera (yellow card) 73'; Gozo 77'	Report	Badji (yellow card) 62'	Stadium: America First Field; Attendance: 20,002; Referee: Jon Freemon

June 28 20	D.C. United	0–1	Nashville SC	Washington, D.C.
7:30 PM EDT	Bartlett (yellow card) 16'; J. Stroud (yellow card) 43'; Pirani (yellow card) 83'	Report	Surridge 18' (pen.); Muyl (yellow card) 53'	Stadium: Audi Field; Attendance: 16,085; Referee: Ricardo Fierro

July 5 21	D.C. United	0–0	Atlanta United FC	Washington, D.C.
7:30 PM EDT	Schnegg (yellow card) 65'	Report	Lennon (yellow card) 13'; Morales (yellow card) 19'; Reilly (yellow card) 87'; Brennan (yellow card) 90+1'	Stadium: Audi Field; Attendance: 16,003; Referee: Guido Gonzales Jr.

July 12 22	LA Galaxy	2–1	D.C. United	Carson, California
10:30 PM EDT	Reus 23'; Yoshida (yellow card) 49'; Fagúndez 53'; Gabriel Pec (yellow card) 81'; Paintsil (yellow card) 90+6'	Report	Hopkins (yellow card) 12'; Bartlett (yellow card) 14'; Schnegg (yellow card) 63'; Pirani 77'; Herrera (yellow card) 88'; Servania (yellow card) 90+2'	Stadium: Dignity Health Sports Park; Attendance: 21,113; Referee: Timothy Ford

July 16 23	Charlotte FC	2–1	D.C. United	Charlotte, North Carolina
7:30 PM EDT	Biel 44', 48'	Report	Hopkins (yellow card) 38'; Pirani 60'	Stadium: Bank of America Stadium; Attendance: 32,293; Referee: Chris Penso

July 19 24	Columbus Crew	2–1	D.C. United	Columbus, Ohio
7:30 PM EDT	Gazdag 31' (pen.); Moreira (yellow card) 38'; Lappalainen 78'	Report	Benteke 48'; Herrera (yellow card) 84' (yellow-red card) 89'	Stadium: Lower.com Field; Attendance: 20,668; Referee: Ekaterina Koroleva

July 26 25	D.C. United	2–4	Austin FC	Washington, D.C.
7:30 PM EDT	Benteke (yellow card) 41', (goal) 90+7' (pen.); Peglow 48'; Enow (yellow card) 82'	Report	Uzuni 22'; Wolff 45', (yellow card) 52'; Bukari 60'; Taylor 90+2'	Stadium: Audi Field; Attendance: 17,474; Referee: Rubiel Vazquez

August 9 26	New England Revolution	2–0	D.C. United	Foxborough, Massachusetts
7:30 PM EDT	Fofana (yellow card) 59'; Campana 62', (yellow card) 76'; Gil 70'	Report	Benteke (yellow card) 11'; Enow (yellow card) 22'	Stadium: Gillette Stadium; Attendance: 21,538; Referee: Drew Fischer

August 16 27	CF Montréal	1–1	D.C. United	Montreal, Quebec
7:30 PM EDT	Petrasso 41'; Morales (yellow card) 53'; Craig (yellow card) 63'	Report	Hopkins 28'; Peltola (yellow card) 32'; Servania (yellow card) 39'; Benteke (yellow card) 42'; Enow (yellow card) 70'	Stadium: Saputo Stadium; Attendance: 15,606; Referee: Lorenzo Hernandez

August 23 28	D.C. United	1–1	Inter Miami CF	Washington, D.C.
7:30 PM EDT	Hopkins 13'; Herrera (yellow card) 36'; Peltola (yellow card) 41'	Report	Cremaschi (yellow card) 51'; Gallego 64'; Suárez (yellow card) 90+7'	Stadium: Audi Field; Attendance: 19,365; Referee: Ricardo Montero

August 30 29	New York City FC	1–2	D.C. United	New York, New York
7:30 PM EDT	Haak 19'; Perea (yellow card) 30'	Report	Schnegg (yellow card) 18'; Pirani 43', 77'; Benteke (yellow card) 45+1'; Enow (yellow card) 87'; Herrera (yellow card) 90+4'	Stadium: Yankee Stadium; Attendance: 20,192; Referee: Alexis Da Silva

September 13 30	D.C. United	1–1	Orlando City SC	Washington, D.C.
7:30 PM EDT	Servania (yellow card) 24'; Hopkins 33'; Bartlett (yellow card) 45'; MacNaughton (red card) 57'; Antley (yellow card) 82'; Peltola (yellow card) 90+2'	Report	Freeman 53'; Atuesta (yellow card) 64'	Stadium: Audi Field; Attendance: 16,195; Referee: Chris Penso

September 20 31	Inter Miami CF	3–2	D.C. United	Fort Lauderdale, Florida
7:30 PM EDT	Busquets (yellow card) 25'; Allende 35'; Luján (yellow card) 49'; Fray (yellow card) 62'; Messi 66', 85'; Segovia (yellow card) 72'; Falcón (yellow card) 76'; Gallego (yellow card) 77'	Report	Benteke 53'; Peglow (yellow card) 82'; Rowles (yellow card) 90'; Murrell 90+7'	Stadium: Chase Stadium; Attendance: 20,319; Referee: Ismir Pekmic

September 27 32	D.C. United	0–6	Philadelphia Union	Washington, D.C.
7:30 PM EDT	Servania (yellow card) 33'; J. Stroud (yellow card) 38'	Report	Damiani 17'; Antley 34' (o.g.); Vassilev 36', 51'; Iloski 49'; Makhanya (yellow card) 57'; Uhre 62'	Stadium: Audi Field; Referee: Jair Marrufo

October 4 33	D.C. United	0–1	Charlotte FC	Washington, D.C.
2:30 PM EDT	Barraza (red card) 21'; Herrera (red card) 30'; Hopkins (yellow card) 42'; Stroud (yellow card) 61'	Report	Zaha 33', (yellow card) 75'; Byrne (yellow card) 37'; Williamson (yellow card) 82'	Stadium: Audi Field; Attendance: 17,003; Referee: Lorenzo Hernandez

October 18 34	Atlanta United FC	1–1	D.C. United	Atlanta, Georgia
6:00 PM EDT	Almirón 3'		MacNaughton (yellow card) 37'; Clark (yellow card) 43'; Hopkins (yellow card) 64'; Pirani 66'; Servania (yellow card) 82'	Stadium: Mercedes-Benz Stadium; Referee: Joshua Encarnación

=== U.S. Open Cup ===
May 6 Round of 32	D.C. United (Washington, D.C.)	2–0 (a.e.t.)	(South Carolina) Charleston Battery	Washington, D.C.
7:00 PM EDT	Murrell 96', (yellow card) 118'; Stroud 103'	Report	Houssou (yellow card) 77'; Edwards (yellow card) 80'; Martínez (yellow card) 110'; Torres (red card) 115'; Molloy (yellow card) 117'	Stadium: Audi Field; Attendance: 6,781; Referee: Ricardo Montero

May 21 Round of 16	D.C. United (Washington, D.C.)	3–3 (a.e.t.) (2–1 p)	(North Carolina) Charlotte FC	Washington, D.C.
7:30 PM EDT	Schnegg 17'; Enow (yellow card) 39'; Tubbs (yellow card) 52' (goal) 86'; Kijima (yellow card) 57'; Hopkins 104'	Report	Tavares (yellow card) 56'; Agyemang 58'; Tuiloma 61'; Smalls 95'	Stadium: Audi Field; Attendance: 5,179; Referee: Sergii Demianchuk
	Penalties
	Herrera (penalty scored); Hopkins (penalty scored); Stroud (penalty missed); Fletcher (penalty missed); Peltola (penalty missed)		(penalty missed) Malanda; (penalty missed) Biel; (penalty scored) Bronico; (penalty missed) Tavares; (penalty missed) Abada

July 9 Quarterfinal	Nashville SC (Tennessee)	5–2	(Washington, D.C.) D.C. United	Nashville, Tennessee
9:00 PM EDT	Pérez 25'; Surridge 53' (pen.), 72'; Tagseth (yellow card) 56'; Najar 81'; Zimmerman 87'	Report	Pirani 5'; Maher 24' (o.g.); Schnegg (yellow card) 49'	Stadium: Geodis Park; Attendance: 21,238; Referee: Greg Dopka

== Statistics ==
=== Appearances and goals ===
Numbers after plus-sign(+) denote appearances as a substitute.

As of November 23, 2025

No.	Pos	Nat	Player	Total		MLS		MLS Cup		U.S. Open Cup		Leagues Cup	
No.	Pos	Nat	Player	Apps	Goals	Apps	Goals	Apps	Goals	Apps	Goals	Apps	Goals
1	GK	(South Korea) KOR	Kim Joon-hong	11	0	8+0	0	0+0	0	3+0	0	0+0	0
3	DF	(United States) USA	Lucas Bartlett	32	0	29+1	0	0+0	0	2+0	0	0+0	0
4	MF	(Finland) FIN	Matti Peltola	29	0	16+10	0	0+0	0	2+1	0	0+0	0
5	DF	(Canada) CAN	Lukas MacNaughton	11	1	9+2	1	0+0	0	0+0	0	0+0	0
6	MF	(Cameroon) CMR	Boris Enow	32	1	17+12	1	0+0	0	3+0	0	0+0	0
7	FW	(Brazil) BRA	Peglow	26	3	21+3	3	0+0	0	2+0	0	0+0	0
8	FW	(United States) USA	Jared Stroud	32	1	15+14	0	0+0	0	0+3	1	0+0	0
10	MF	(Brazil) BRA	Gabriel Pirani	29	8	22+6	7	0+0	0	1+0	1	0+0	0
11	FW	(Costa Rica) CRC	Randall Leal	18	0	4+11	0	0+0	0	0+3	0	0+0	0
12	DF	(United States) USA	Conner Antley	20	1	17+3	1	0+0	0	0+0	0	0+0	0
13	GK	(United States) USA	Luis Barraza	24	0	24+0	0	0+0	0	0+0	0	0+0	0
14	FW	(Senegal) SEN	Dominique Badji	22	1	6+15	1	0+0	0	0+1	0	0+0	0
15	DF	(Australia) AUS	Kye Rowles	34	0	29+2	0	0+0	0	3+0	0	0+0	0
16	DF	(United States) USA	Garrison Tubbs	10	1	7+1	0	0+0	0	2+0	1	0+0	0
17	FW	(United States) USA	Jacob Murrell	26	3	7+17	2	0+0	0	2+0	1	0+0	0
18	DF	(United States) USA	Derek Dodson	15	0	5+9	0	0+0	0	1+0	0	0+0	0
19	FW	(United States) USA	Hakim Karamoko	2	0	0+1	0	0+0	0	1+0	0	0+0	0
20	FW	(Belgium) BEL	Christian Benteke	26	9	23+2	9	0+0	0	1+0	0	0+0	0
22	DF	(Guatemala) GUA	Aaron Herrera	29	0	24+2	0	0+0	0	2+1	0	0+0	0
23	MF	(United States) USA	Brandon Servania	33	0	24+6	0	0+0	0	3+0	0	0+0	0
24	GK	(United States) USA	Jordan Farr	4	0	2+1	0	0+0	0	0+1	0	0+0	0
25	MF	(United States) USA	Jackson Hopkins	19	4	11+6	3	0+0	0	1+1	1	0+0	0
27	FW	(United States) USA	Kristian Fletcher	4	0	0+3	0	0+0	0	0+1	0	0+0	0
28	DF	(Austria) AUT	David Schnegg	35	1	31+1	0	0+0	0	3+0	1	0+0	0
30	FW	(United States) USA	Caden Clark	4	0	1+3	0	0+0	0	0+0	0	0+0	0
44	MF	(Morocco) MAR	Rida Zouhir	16	0	2+13	0	0+0	0	0+1	0	0+0	0
48	MF	(United States) USA	Gavin Turner	1	0	0+1	0	0+0	0	0+0	0	0+0	0
77	MF	(Japan) JPN	Hosei Kijima	31	2	20+9	2	0+0	0	2+0	0	0+0	0
99	FW	(Mexico) MEX	Fidel Barajas	5	0	0+4	0	0+0	0	0+1	0	0+0	0

=== Top scorers ===
Rank	Position	No.	Name	MLS	U.S. Open Cup	Total
1	FW	20	(Belgium) Christian Benteke	9	0	9
2	MF	10	(Brazil) Gabriel Pirani	7	1	8
3	FW	7	(Brazil) João Peglow	3	0	3
3	MF	25	(United States) Jackson Hopkins	2	1	3
5	MF	77	(Japan) Hosei Kijima	2	0	2
5	FW	17	(United States) Jacob Murrell	1	1	2
7	7 players with 1 goal					
Total				30	7	37

- Last updated: November 20, 2025
- Source: Team Stats

=== Top assists ===
Rank	Position	No.	Name	MLS	MLS Cup	U.S. Open Cup	Leagues Cup	Total
1	DF	22	(Guatemala) Aaron Herrera	4	0	1	0	5
2	FW	10	(Brazil) Gabriel Pirani	4	0	0	0	4
2	MF	7	(Brazil) João Peglow	4	0	0	0	4
2	DF	28	(Austria) David Schnegg	4	0	0	0	4
2	MF	11	(Costa Rica) Randall Leal	1	0	3	0	4
6	FW	20	(Belgium) Christian Benteke	3	0	0	0	3
6	MF	23	(United States) Brandon Servania	3	0	0	0	3
8	DF	4	(Finland) Matti Peltola	2	0	0	0	2
8	MF	44	(Morocco) Rida Zouhir	2	0	0	0	2
10	8 players with 1 assist							
Total				33	0	7	0	40

- Last updated: November 22, 2025
- Source: Team Stats

=== Disciplinary record ===
No.	Pos.	Nat.	Player	MLS			U.S. Open Cup			Total		
No.	Pos.	Nat.	Player	Yellow card	(yellow card) (yellow-red card)	Red card	Yellow card	(yellow card) (yellow-red card)	Red card	Yellow card	(yellow card) (yellow-red card)	Red card
1	GK	KOR	Kim Joon-hong	1	0	0	0	0	0	1	0	0
3	DF	USA	Lucas Bartlett	6	0	0	0	0	0	6	0	0
4	DF	FIN	Matti Peltola	6	0	0	0	0	0	6	0	0
5	DF	CAN	Lukas MacNaughton	3	0	0	0	0	0	3	0	0
6	MF	CMR	Boris Enow	8	0	0	1	0	0	9	0	0
7	FW	BRA	João Peglow	3	0	0	0	0	0	3	0	0
8	FW	USA	Jared Stroud	3	0	0	0	0	0	3	0	0
10	MF	BRA	Gabriel Pirani	2	0	0	0	0	0	2	0	0
12	DF	USA	Conner Antley	1	0	0	0	0	0	1	0	0
13	GK	USA	Luis Barraza	3	0	0	0	0	0	3	0	0
14	FW	CMR	Dominique Badji	3	0	0	0	0	0	3	0	0
15	DF	AUS	Kye Rowles	8	0	0	0	0	0	8	0	0
16	DF	USA	Garrison Tubbs	3	0	0	1	0	0	4	0	0
17	FW	USA	Jacob Murrell	1	0	0	1	0	0	2	0	0
18	DF	USA	Derek Dodson	1	0	0	0	0	0	1	0	0
19	FW	USA	Hakim Karamoko	1	0	0	0	0	0	1	0	0
20	FW	BEL	Christian Benteke	7	0	0	0	0	0	7	0	0
22	DF	GUA	Aaron Herrera	8	0	1	0	0	0	8	0	1
23	MF	USA	Brandon Servania	7	0	0	0	0	0	7	0	0
25	MF	USA	Jackson Hopkins	4	0	0	0	0	0	4	0	0
28	DF	AUT	David Schnegg	8	0	0	1	0	0	9	0	0
30	MF	USA	Caden Clark	1	0	0	0	0	0	1	0	0
44	MF	MAR	Rida Zouhir	1	0	0	0	0	0	1	0	0
77	MF	JPN	Hosei Kijima	0	0	0	1	0	0	1	0	0

== Player awards ==
=== MLS Team of the Matchday ===
Week	Player(s)	Opponent(s)
1	XI: Boris Enow	Toronto FC
9	XI: Peglow	New York Red Bulls
11	Bench: Christian Benteke	Colorado Rapids
13	XI: Luis Barraza	New York City FC
16	Bench: Gabriel Pirani	New England Revolution
17	XI: Gabriel Pirani; Bench: Antley	FC Cincinnati
31	XI: Gabriel Pirani	New York City FC
35	Bench: Christian Benteke	Inter Miami
