= José Carlos Prieto =

Chilean footballer (born 1989)

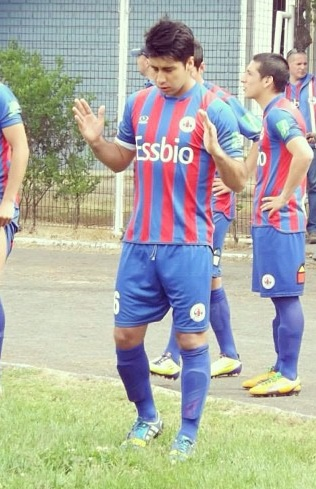
- Photo of José Carlos Prieto during a football match

Personal information
- Full name: José Carlos Prieto
- Date of birth: 29 November 1989 (age 36)
- Place of birth: Iquique, Chile
- Height: 1.75 m (5 ft 9 in)
- Position: Central midfielder

Team information
- Current team: Deportes Iquique
- Number: 5

Senior career*
Years	Team	Apps	(Gls)
2009	Mejillones	24	(1)
2010–	Deportes Iquique	7	(0)
2011	→ Mejillones (loan)	2	(0)
- * Club domestic league appearances and goals as of 25 May 2012

José Carlos Prieto (Spanish pronunciation: [xoˈse ˈkaɾlos ˈpɾjeto], born 22 November 1989) is a Chilean footballer that currently plays for Primera División club Deportes Iquique as a central midfielder.

== Honours ==
=== Club ===
Deportes Iquique

- Primera B (1): 2010
- Copa Chile (1): 2010
