= Hosei Kijima =

Japanese footballer (born 2002)

Hosei Kijima 木島 萌生
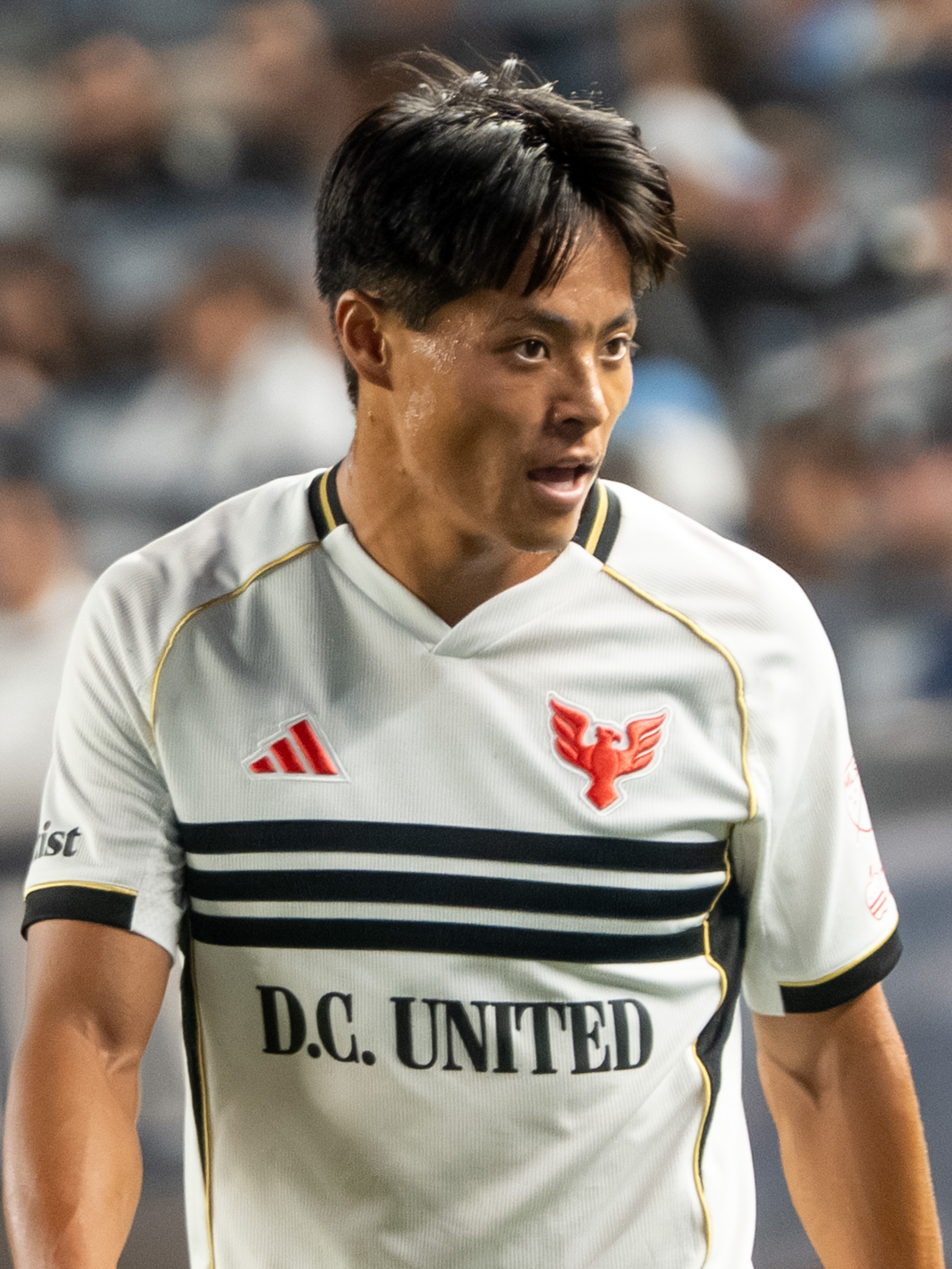
- Kijima with DC United in 2025

Personal information
- Date of birth: July 1, 2002 (age 24)
- Place of birth: Yokohama, Kanagawa, Japan
- Height: 1.78 m (5 ft 10 in)
- Position: Midfielder

Team information
- Current team: D.C. United
- Number: 77

Youth career
- 2014–2020: IMG Academy

College career
Years	Team	Apps	(Gls)
2020–2023	Wake Forest Demon Deacons	63	(9)

Senior career*
Years	Team	Apps	(Gls)
2023	Sarasota Paradise	9	(1)
2024	St. Louis City SC	18	(1)
2024	St. Louis City 2	13	(1)
2025–	D.C. United	29	(2)
- * Club domestic league appearances and goals as of 25 October 2025

Hosei Kijima (木島 萌生, Kijima Hōsei; born July 1, 2002) is a Japanese professional footballer who plays as a midfielder for Major League Soccer club D.C. United.

== Early life and career ==
Kijima spent his early childhood in Yokohama and attended an international school where English was spoken. Inspired by the success of Japanese tennis player Kei Nishikori and after learning that he had attended IMG Academy, a sport-focused boarding school in Bradenton, Florida, United States, Kijima attended an IMG summer camp in 2014 and then enrolled fulltime at age 12. He went on to play college soccer at Wake Forest, where he scored 9 goals and assisted 10 in 63 games over 4 seasons.

== Club career ==
Sarasota Paradise

Kijima played for the semi-professional USL League Two club Sarasota Paradise in the 2023 season.

=== St. Louis City SC ===
Hosei Kijima was selected 17th overall in the 2024 MLS SuperDraft by St. Louis City SC and signed a first-team contract with the club on February 20, 2024. Later that same day, he made his debut for St. Louis in their CONCACAF Champions Cup match against Houston Dynamo, scoring the game-winning goal after coming on as a substitute in the 86th minute.

On March 16, 2024, Kijima made his MLS debut for St. Louis City SC, coming in as a substitute in the 71st minute to replace Aziel Jackson.

=== D.C. United ===
On December 11, 2024, Hosei Kijima was one of five players selected in the 2024 MLS Expansion Draft by San Diego FC. Immediately following the announcement of Kijima's selection, San Diego traded Kijima to D.C. United in return for $400,000 in general allocation money.

== Career statistics ==
=== Club ===
As of match played October 19, 2025

Appearances and goals by club, season and competition
Club	Season	League			National cup		Continental		Other		Total	
Club	Season	Division	Apps	Goals	Apps	Goals	Apps	Goals	Apps	Goals	Apps	Goals
St. Louis City SC	2024	MLS	18	1	—		2 (Note: Appearances in CONCACAF Champions Cup)	1	1 (Note: Appearances in Leagues Cup)	0	21	2
St. Louis City 2	2024	MLS Next Pro	13	1	—		—		3 (Note: Appearances in MLS Next Pro playoffs)	0	16	1
D.C. United	2025	MLS	29	2	2 (Note: Appearance in U.S. Open Cup)	0	—		0	0	31	2
Career total			60	4	2	0	2	1	4	0	68	5
