= João Peglow =

Brazilian footballer (born 2002)

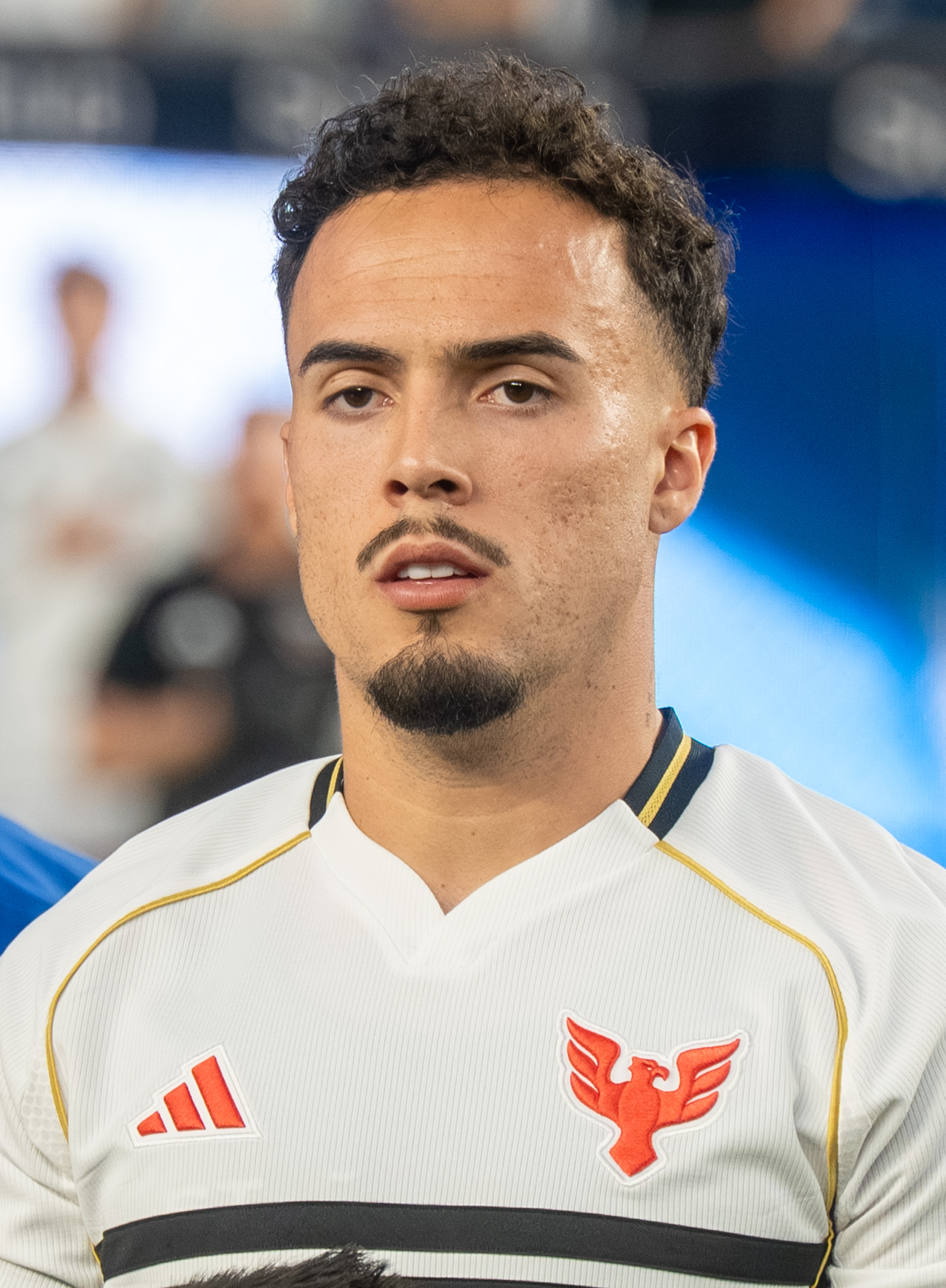
- Peglow with DC United in 2025

Personal information
- Full name: João Gabriel Martins Peglow
- Date of birth: 7 January 2002 (age 24)
- Place of birth: Porto Alegre, Brazil
- Height: 1.70 m (5 ft 7 in)
- Position: Attacking midfielder

Team information
- Current team: D.C. United
- Number: 7

Youth career
- 2011–2020: Internacional

Senior career*
Years	Team	Apps	(Gls)
2020–2024	Internacional	18	(2)
2021–2022	→ Porto B (loan)	32	(3)
2022	→ Atlético Goianiense (loan)	6	(0)
2023	→ Dnipro-1 (loan)	13	(3)
2023	→ Sport (loan)	12	(2)
2024	Radomiak Radom	25	(1)
2025–	D.C. United	24	(3)

International career
2018	Brazil U16	4	(3)
2018–2019	Brazil U17	17	(7)
Medal record
Men's football
Representing Brazil
FIFA U-17 World Cup
Winner	2019 Brazil
- * Club domestic league appearances and goals as of 14:08, 21 October 2025 (UTC)

João Gabriel Martins Peglow (born 7 January 2002) is a Brazilian professional footballer who plays as an attacking midfielder for Major League Soccer club D.C. United.

== Club career ==
Born in Porto Alegre, Rio Grande do Sul, Peglow joined Internacional's youth setup in 2011, aged just nine. In April 2018, he signed his first professional deal at the age of 16.

In October 2019, after impressing with the national team, Peglow was promoted to the first team for the following season, and further extended his contract until December 2023 on 1 January 2020. He made his senior debut on 25 July, coming on as a second-half substitute for Marcos Guilherme in a 1–1 Campeonato Gaúcho away draw against Esportivo.

On 14 July 2021, Peglow joined Liga Portugal 2 side Porto B on a season-long loan deal with an option to buy.

In early 2024, after loan spells with Atlético Goianiense, Dnipro-1 and Sport, Peglow terminated his contract with Internacional. Shortly after, on 19 March, he joined Polish Ekstraklasa club Radomiak Radom on a deal until mid-2026. He made his debut on 5 April, coming onto the pitch in the 87th minute of a 2–1 home win over Raków Częstochowa.

On 16 December 2024, Peglow moved to Major League Soccer side D.C. United on a three-year deal, with an option for another year.

== International career ==
Peglow appeared with Brazil under-16 football team in the 2018 Montaigu Tournament, scoring three goals in four matches. He also was an undisputed starter for the under-17s, playing 17 matches and scoring seven goals while also lifting the 2019 FIFA U-17 World Cup.

== Career statistics ==
As of match played 19 October 2025

Appearances and goals by club, season and competition
Club	Season	League			State league		National cup (Note: Includes Copa do Brasil, Polish Cup, U.S. Open Cup)		Other		Total	
Club	Season	Division	Apps	Goals	Apps	Goals	Apps	Goals	Apps	Goals	Apps	Goals
Internacional	2020	Série A	16	2	1 (Note: Appearance(s) in Campeonato Gaúcho)	0	2	0	2 (Note: Appearance(s) in Copa Libertadores)	0	21	2
Internacional	2021	Série A	1	0	3	0	0	0	0	0	4	0
Internacional	Total		17	2	4	0	2	0	2	0	25	2
Porto B (loan)	2021–22	Liga Portugal 2	32	3	—		—		—		32	3
Atlético Goianiense (loan)	2021	Série A	6	0	—		2	0	1	0	9	0
Dnipro-1 (loan)	2022–23	Ukrainian Premier League	13	3	—		—		2 (Note: Appearances in UEFA Europa Conference League)	0	15	3
Sport (loan)	2023	Série B	12	2	—		—		—		12	2
Radomiak Radom	2023–24	Ekstraklasa	8	0	—		—		—		8	0
Radomiak Radom	2024–25	Ekstraklasa	17	1	—		2	0	—		19	1
Radomiak Radom	Total		25	1	0	0	2	0	0	0	27	1
D.C. United	2025	Major League Soccer	24	3	—		2	0	—		26	3
Career total			129	14	4	0	8	0	5	0	146	14

== Honours ==
Brazil U17

- FIFA U-17 World Cup: 2019
