= Gabriel Pirani =

Brazilian footballer (born 2002)

- Pirani with San Diego FC in 2026

Personal information
- Full name: Gabriel Cordeiro Pirani
- Date of birth: 12 April 2002 (age 24)
- Place of birth: Penápolis, Brazil
- Height: 1.67 m (5 ft 6 in)
- Position: Attacking midfielder

Team information
- Current team: San Diego FC
- Number: 12

Youth career
- 2013–2021: Santos

Senior career*
Years	Team	Apps	(Gls)
2021–2023	Santos	51	(4)
2022	→ Cuiabá (loan)	10	(1)
2023	→ Fluminense (loan)	15	(2)
2023	→ D.C. United (loan)	10	(1)
2024–2026	D.C. United	68	(13)
2026–	San Diego FC	0	(0)

International career^{‡}
2023–	Brazil U23	12	(2)
Medal record
Men's football
Representing Brazil
Pan American Games
Winner	2023 Santiago
- * Club domestic league appearances and goals as of 9 July 2026 ‡ National team caps and goals as of 26 July 2024

Gabriel Cordeiro Pirani (Brazilian Portuguese: [ɡɐbɾiˈɛw piˈɾɐni]; born 12 April 2002) is a Brazilian professional footballer who plays as an attacking midfielder for Major League Soccer club San Diego FC.

== Club career ==
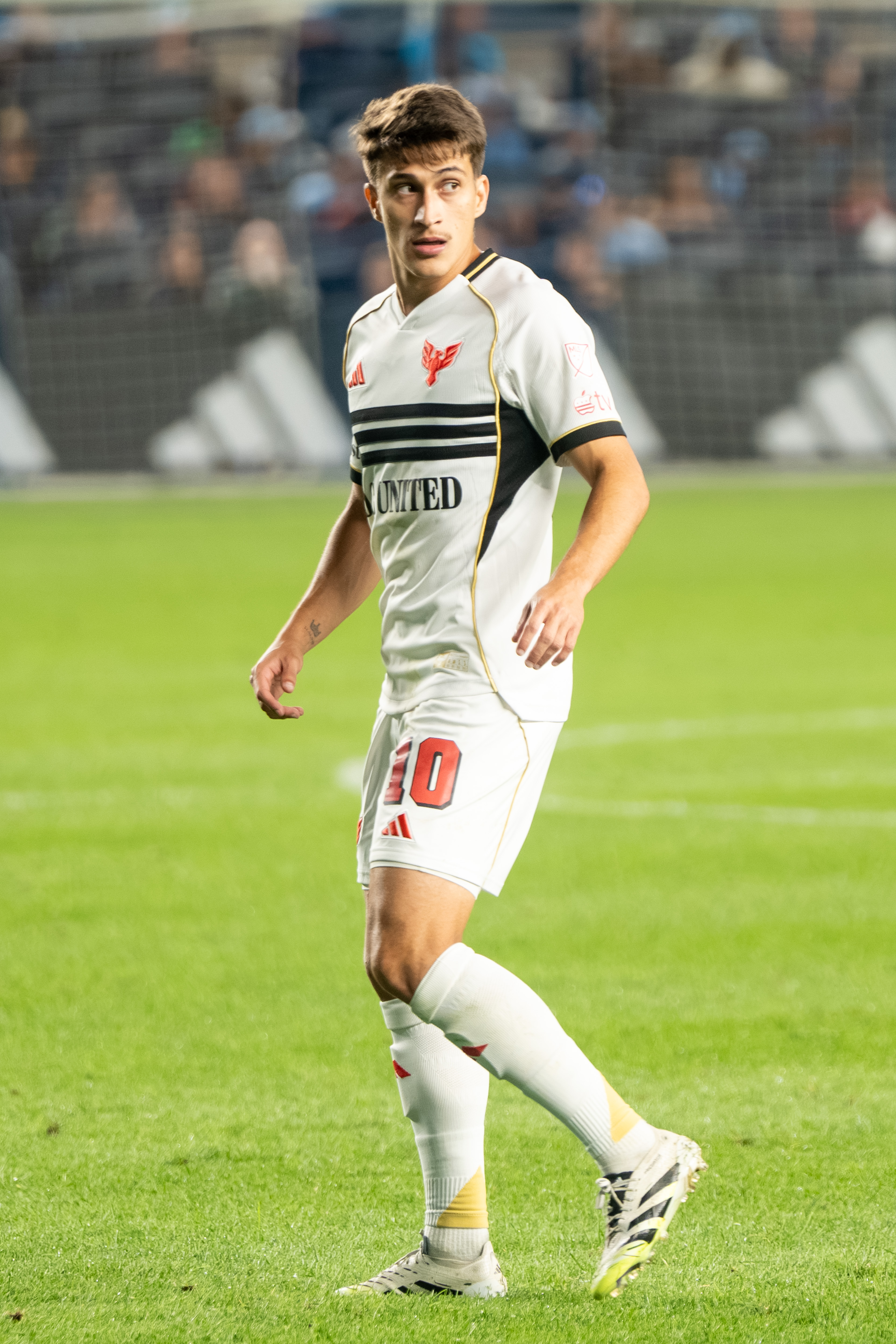
Gabriel Pirani with DC United in 2025

=== Santos ===
Born in Penápolis, São Paulo, Pirani joined Santos' youth setup at the age of ten. On 27 July 2018, he signed his first professional contract with the club, agreeing to a deal until June 2021.

On 3 February 2020, Pirani further extended his contract, until December 2022. The following 25 February, he made his first team – and Série A – debut, coming on as a half-time substitute for Fernando Pileggi in a 0–2 away loss against Bahia.

Pirani scored his first professional goal on 28 February 2021, netting his team's second in a 2–2 Campeonato Paulista away draw against Santo André. He made his Copa Libertadores debut on 9 March, replacing Sandry in a 2–1 home success over Deportivo Lara.

On 21 May 2021, after establishing himself as a regular in the main squad, Pirani renewed his contract until December 2025. In the 2022 season, however, he lost his starting spot under manager Fabián Bustos.

==== Loan to Cuiabá ====
On 13 June 2022, Santos agreed to loan Pirani to fellow top-tier side Cuiabá until the end of the season, with the move being effective on 18 July. He scored on his club debut, netting a last-minute equalizer in a 1–1 home draw against Atlético Mineiro three days later, but only featured in nine more matches during the competition, as Dourado narrowly avoided relegation.

==== Loan to Fluminense ====
After being requested to return to Santos' first team squad by head coach Odair Hellmann in December 2022, Pirani featured rarely, and moved to Fluminense also in the first division on 23 February 2023, on loan until the end of the year. In his second game, he scored the winning goal in a 2–1 win over Flamengo, which led his side to the Taça Guanabara title.

On 15 July 2023, Pirani's loan with Fluminense was cut short, as he was under negotiations with a club from the United States.

=== D.C. United ===
On 27 July 2023, Major League Soccer side D.C. United announced the signing of Pirani on loan until the end of the year. On 1 January 2024, the club activated his buyout clause, with the player signing a two-year deal.

=== San Diego FC ===
On 9 July 2026, Pirani was traded to San Diego FC in exchange for up to $1,000,000 in General Allocation Money. $350,000 guaranteed and the remaining $650,000 dependent on performance.

== Career statistics ==
As of 19 October 2025

Club	Season	League			State League		Cup		Continental		Other		Total	
Club	Season	Division	Apps	Goals	Apps	Goals	Apps	Goals	Apps	Goals	Apps	Goals	Apps	Goals
Santos	2020	Série A	1	0	—		0	0	0	0	—		1	0
Santos	2021	Série A	32	3	8	1	6	0	14 (Note: Ten appearances and one goal in Copa Libertadores, four appearances in Copa Sudamericana)	1	—		60	5
Santos	2022	Série A	3	0	5	0	1	0	5 (Note: Appearance(s) in Copa Sudamericana)	0	—		14	0
Santos	2023	Série A	0	0	2	0	0	0	0	0	—		2	0
Santos	Total		36	3	15	1	7	0	19	1	—		77	5
Cuiabá (loan)	2022	Série A	10	1	—		—		—		0	0	10	1
Fluminense (loan)	2023	Série A	9	1	6	1	4	0	5 (Note: Appearance(s) in Copa Libertadores)	0	—		24	2
D.C. United (loan)	2023	Major League Soccer	10	1	—		—		—		—		10	1
D.C. United	2024	Major League Soccer	33	6	—		—		3 (Note: Appearance(s) in Leagues Cup)	0	—		36	6
D.C. United	2025	Major League Soccer	28	7	—		1	1	—		—		29	8
D.C. United	Total		61	13	0	0	1	1	3	0	0	0	65	14
Career total			126	19	21	2	12	1	27	1	0	0	186	29

== Honours ==
=== Club ===
Fluminense

- Campeonato Carioca: 2023
- Copa Libertadores: 2023

=== International ===
Brazil U23

- Pan American Games: 2023
