= David Schnegg =

Austrian footballer (born 1998)

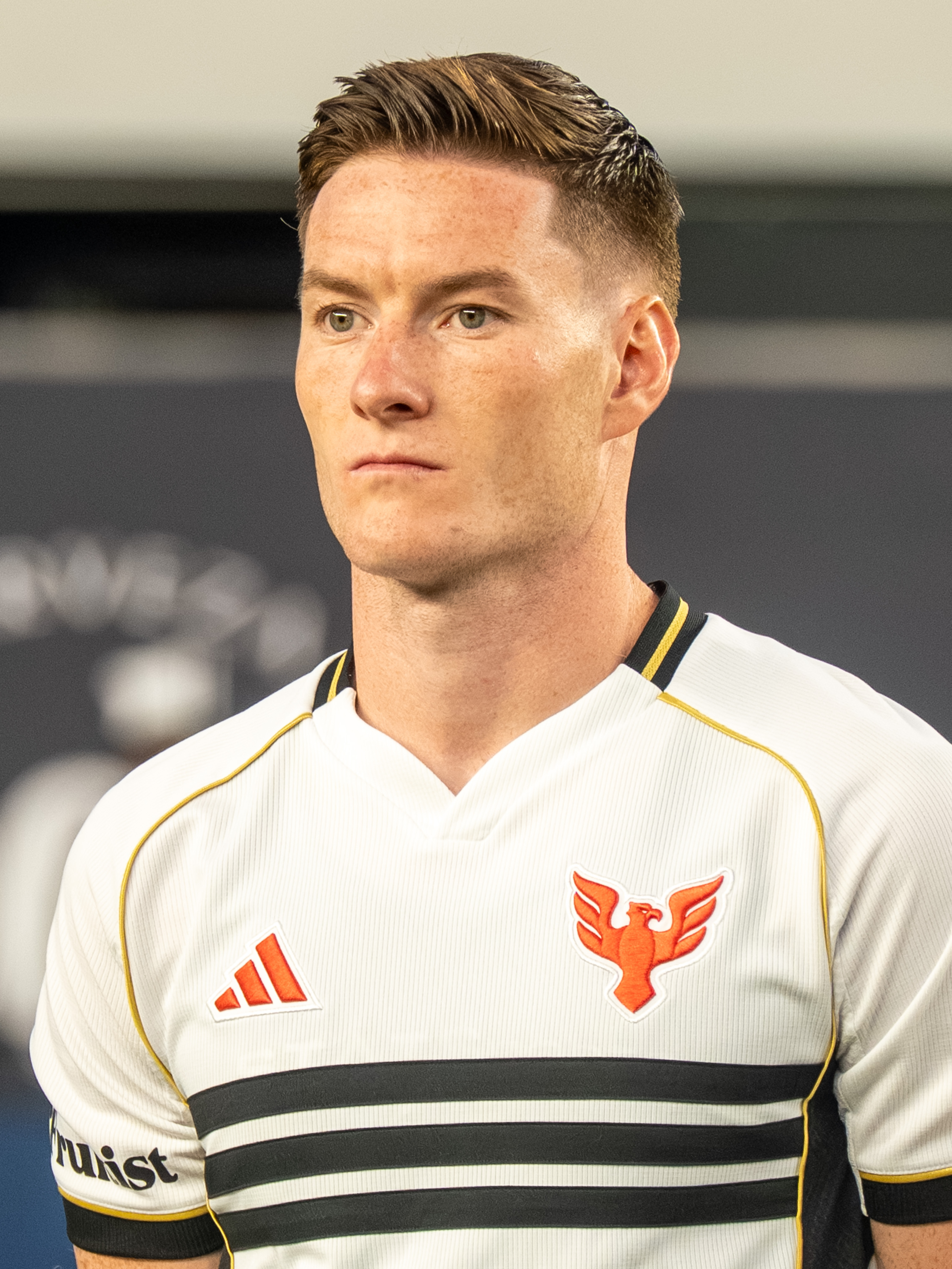
- Schnegg with DC United in 2025

Personal information
- Date of birth: 29 September 1998 (age 28)
- Place of birth: Mils bei Imst, Austria
- Height: 1.84 m (6 ft 0 in)
- Position: Left-back

Team information
- Current team: Charlotte FC
- Number: 23

Youth career
- FG Schönwies/Mils
- Academy Tyrol

Senior career*
Years	Team	Apps	(Gls)
2017–2018	WSG Wattens	15	(2)
2018–2019	Liefering	16	(1)
2020	FC Juniors OÖ	14	(1)
2020–2021	LASK	2	(0)
2020–2021	→ WSG Tirol (loan)	29	(2)
2021–2022	Venezia	4	(0)
2022	→ Crotone (loan)	15	(1)
2022–2024	Sturm Graz	58	(3)
2024–2025	D.C. United	34	(1)
2026–	Charlotte FC	22	(2)

International career^{‡}
2020	Austria U21	4	(0)
2023–	Austria	1	(0)
- * Club domestic league appearances and goals as of 20:42, 15 November 2026 (UTC) ‡ National team caps and goals as of 7 September 2023

David Schnegg (born 29 September 1998) is an Austrian professional footballer who plays as a left-back for Major League Soccer club Charlotte FC and the Austria national team.

== Club career ==
Schnegg started playing football for FG Schönwies/Mils and for the Academy Tyrol. From 2017 to 2018, he played for SC Imst in the Tyrol League, the 4th level in Austrian football. In January 2018, he moved to WSG Wattens in the Erste Liga.

He made his professional debut playing for WSG Wattens against FC Wacker Innsbruck on 9 March 2018.

For the 2018–19 season, he joined FC Liefering.

On 17 August 2020, he returned to WSG Swarovski Tirol on a season-long loan.

Schnegg moved to Italian club Venezia in June 2021. On 15 January 2022, he joined Crotone on loan.

On 15 June 2022, Schnegg returned to Austria and signed a four-year contract with Sturm Graz.

On 4 July 2024, Schnegg moved to the United States, joining Major League Soccer side D.C. United on a deal through to the end of 2026.

On 15 January 2026, Schnegg was claimed off waivers by fellow MLS club Charlotte FC.

== International career ==
Schnegg was called up to the Austria national team for a set of UEFA Euro 2024 qualifying matches in September 2023.

== Career statistics ==
=== Club ===
As of match played on 10 May 2025

Appearances and goals by club, season and competition
Club	Season	League			Cup		Continental		Other		Total	
Club	Season	Division	Apps	Goals	Apps	Goals	Apps	Goals	Apps	Goals	Apps	Goals
WSG Wattens	2017–18	Austrian First League	15	2	0	0	—		—		15	2
FC Liefering	2018–19	Austrian Second League	16	1	0	0	—		—		16	1
FC Juniors OÖ	2019–20	Austrian Second League	14	1	0	0	—		—		14	1
LASK	2019–20	Austrian Bundesliga	2	0	1	0	—		—		3	0
LASK	2020–21	Austrian Bundesliga	0	0	0	0	—		—		0	0
LASK	Total		2	0	1	0	0	0	0	0	3	0
WSG Tirol (loan)	2020–21	Austrian Bundesliga	29	2	2	0	—		—		31	2
Venezia	2021–22	Serie A	4	0	3	0	—		—		7	0
Crotone (loan)	2021–22	Serie B	15	1	0	0	—		—		15	1
Sturm Graz	2022–23	Austrian Bundesliga	30	3	5	0	4 (Note: Two Appearances in the UEFA Champions League and two Appearances in the UEFA Europa League)	0	—		39	3
Sturm Graz	2023–24	Austrian Bundesliga	28	0	4	0	6 (Note: One appearance in UEFA Champions League, three appearances in UEFA Europa League, two appearances in UEFA Conference League)	0	—		38	0
Sturm Graz	Total		58	3	9	0	10	0	0	0	67	3
D.C. United	2024	Major League Soccer	2	1	0	0	3 (Note: Appearance(s) in Leagues Cup)	0	—		5	1
D.C. United	2025	Major League Soccer	12	0	1 (Note: Appearance in U.S. Open Cup)	0	—		—		13	0
D.C. United	Total		14	1	1	0	3	0	0	0	18	1
Career total			167	11	16	0	13	0	0	0	196	11

=== International ===
As of match played 7 September 2023

Appearances and goals by national team and year
National team	Year	Apps	Goals
Austria	2023	1	0
Total		1	0
