= Lucas Bartlett =

American soccer player (born 1997)

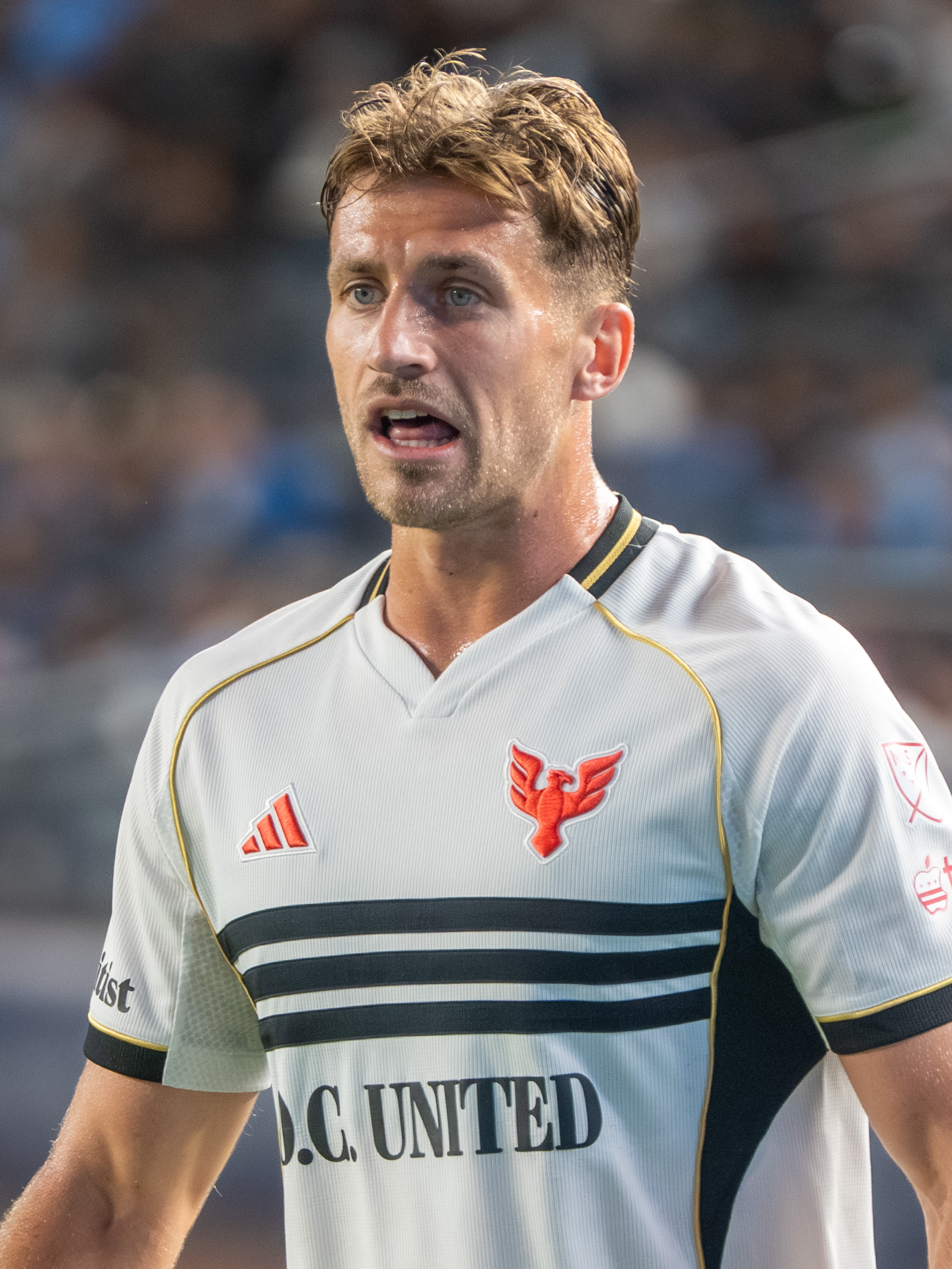
- Bartlett with DC United in 2025

Personal information
- Full name: Lucas Allen Bartlett
- Date of birth: July 26, 1997 (age 29)
- Place of birth: Kansas City, Missouri, U.S.
- Height: 6 ft 3 in (1.91 m)
- Position: Defender

Team information
- Current team: D.C. United
- Number: 3

Youth career
- –2016: Sporting Kansas City

College career
Years	Team	Apps	(Gls)
2016–2017	Loyola Ramblers	18	(0)
2018–2021	Drake Bulldogs	31	(3)
2021	St. John's Red Storm	20	(5)

Senior career*
Years	Team	Apps	(Gls)
2018–2021	Kaw Valley FC	12	(0)
2022	FC Dallas	0	(0)
2022	North Texas SC	13	(0)
2023	St. Louis City	14	(0)
2023	St. Louis City 2	3	(0)
2024–	D.C. United	85	(4)
- * Club domestic league appearances and goals as of September 17, 2026

Lucas Allen Bartlett (born July 26, 1997) is an American professional soccer player who plays as a defender for Major League Soccer club D.C. United.

== Career ==
=== Early career ===
Barlett attended St. Thomas Aquinas in Kansas, where he was a four-year varsity starter, earning Kansas Gatorade Player of the Year and an NSCAA All-American honors as a senior, to go along with Defensive Player of the Year accolades for the state of Kansas. He also played club soccer at Sporting Kansas City affiliated club side Sporting Blue Valley.

In 2016, Bartlett committed to playing college soccer at Loyola University Chicago. In his freshman year, Barlett didn't see any game time due to injury and redshirted that season, but went to make 18 appearances in 2017. Barlett transferred to Drake University, going on to make 31 appearances for the Bulldogs, scoring three goals and tallying four assists. In the 2020–21 season, Bartlett was named First-Feam All-Missouri Valley Conference, and was voted to the All-MVC Scholar Athlete first team and CoSIDA Academic All-District team.

In 2021, Barlett had an unsuccessful trial at Atlanta United, before going to compete as a graduate student at St. John's University. Here he scored five goals and created three goals in 20 appearances, been named First Team All-BIG EAST and United Soccer Coaches Second Team All-Region.

While at college, Barlett also played in the USL League Two with Kaw Valley FC from 2018 to 2021, missing 2020 when the season was cancelled due to the COVID-19 pandemic.

=== Professional ===
On January 11, 2022, Bartlett was selected 6th overall in the 2022 MLS SuperDraft by FC Dallas. He officially signed with Dallas on January 28, 2022. Barlett went on to spend the majority of the 2022 season with Dallas' MLS Next Pro affiliate North Texas SC. Following the 2022 season, his contract option was declined by Dallas.

On March 8, 2023, Bartlett signed a one-year deal with MLS side St. Louis City. The following season, he was acquired by D.C. United.

== Personal ==
Lucas is the younger brother of former professional soccer player Alec Bartlett. Lucas is the older brother of Jacob Bartlett, who currently plays at Sporting Kansas City. His sister is Grace Bartlett, who played collegiate soccer at Grand Canyon University.

== Career statistics ==
=== Club ===
As of match played March 14, 2026

Appearances and goals by club, season and competition
Club	Season	League			U.S. Open Cup		Other		Total	
Club	Season	Division	Apps	Goals	Apps	Goals	Apps	Goals	Apps	Goals
FC Dallas	2022	Major League Soccer	0	0	2	0	—		2	0
North Texas SC	2022	MLS Next Pro	13	0	—		—		13	0
St. Louis City SC	2023	Major League Soccer	14	0	1	0	2 (Note: Appearances in Leagues Cup)	0	17	0
St. Louis City 2	2023	MLS Next Pro	3	0	—		—		3	0
D.C. United	2024	Major League Soccer	32	2	—		3	0	35	2
D.C. United	2025	Major League Soccer	30	0	2	0	—		32	0
D.C. United	2026	Major League Soccer	24	3	—		—		24	3
D.C. United	Total		86	5	2	0	3	0	91	5
Career total			116	5	5	0	5	0	126	5

== Honors ==
St. Louis City SC

- Western Conference (regular season): 2023
