= Juan Felipe Gomez =

Colombian racquetball player

Personal information
- Nationality: Colombian
- Born: June 7, 1977 (age 49) Bogota, Colombia

Sport
- Sport: Racquetball
- Coached by: Jeff Leon, William Cubillos
- Retired: 2003

Achievements and titles
- National finals: 1992-2002
- Highest world ranking: 8th place World Championships (1998)
Medal record
Men's Racquetball
Representing Colombia
Pan American Championships
| Bronze medal – third place | 1996 | Singles |
South American Championships
| Gold medal – first place | 1995 | Singles |
| Silver medal – second place | 1993 | Singles |
Bolivarian Games
| Silver medal – second place | 1993 Bolivia | Teams |
| Bronze medal – third place | 1993 Bolivia | Singles |

Juan Felipe Gomez (born June 7, 1977) is a retired Colombian Racquetball player. Gomez won gold at the 1995 South American Championship in Men's Singles. He was ranked Colombian #1 player for a decade, from 1992 to 2002. Gomez was also Junior National Champion and doubles National Champion representing Colombia in various IRF - International Racquetball Federation events such as South American and Pan American Games and the World Racquetball Championships.

== Medal record / Men's racquetball Representing Colombia ==
World Championships; Quarter Finals - Singles 1998

Pan American Championships; Semi Final - Singles 1996

South American Championships; Gold Medal - 1995 and Silver Medal - 1993

Bolivarian Games; Silver medal – 1993

World Junior Championships; Semi Final - Singles 14 & under - 1992
