= Boris Enow =

Cameroonian footballer (born 2000)

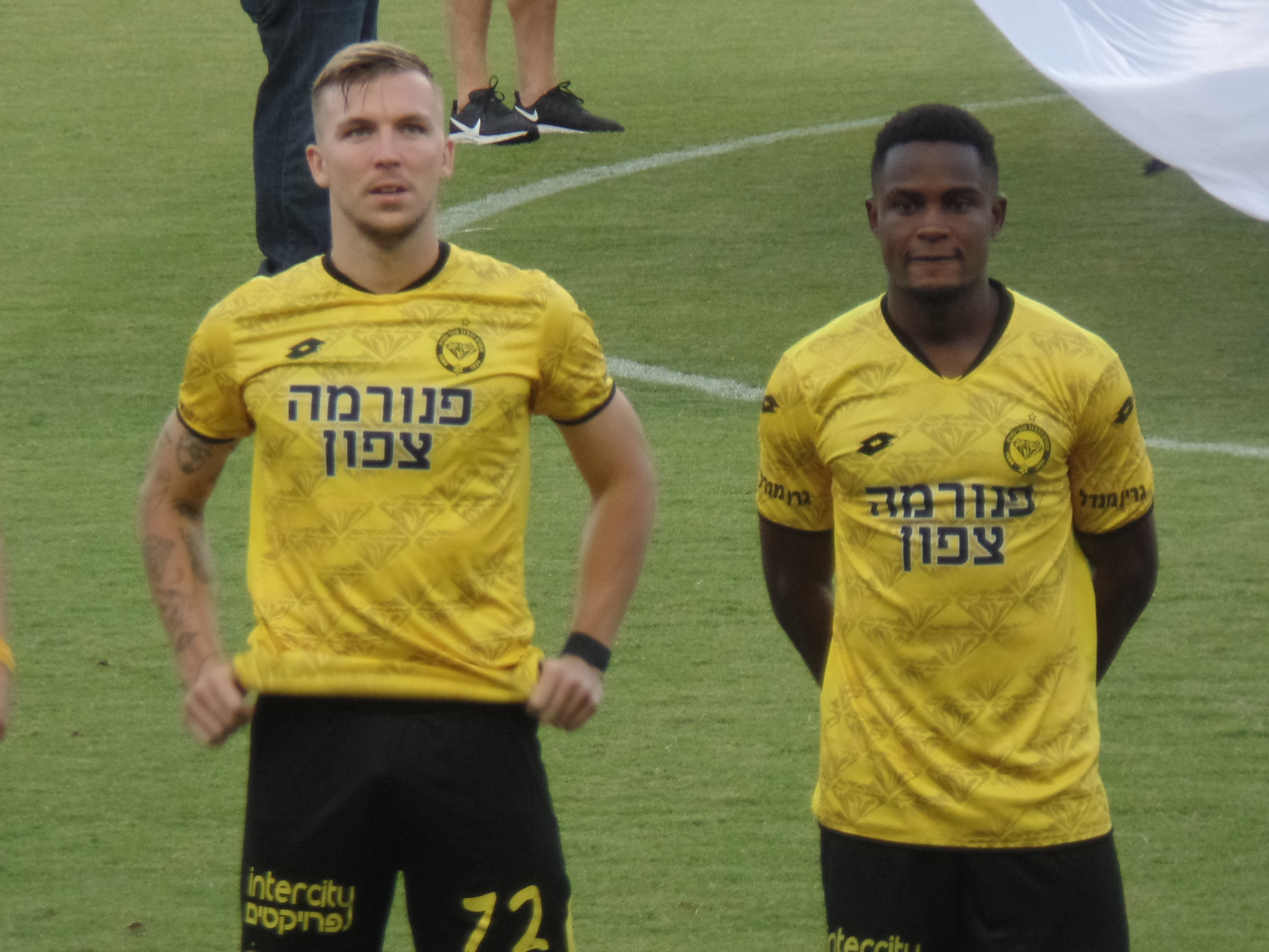
- Boris Enow (right) and Eden Kartsev in 2022

Personal information
- Full name: Boris Enow Takang
- Date of birth: 30 March 2000 (age 26)
- Height: 1.75 m (5 ft 9 in)
- Position: Midfielder

Team information
- Current team: Beitar Jerusalem
- Number: 40

Youth career
- –2018: École de Football; Brasseries du Cameroun
- 2018–2020: Porto

Senior career*
| Years | Team | Apps | (Gls) |
| 2019–2020 | Porto B | 14 | (1) |
| 2020–2021 | Lens B | 8 | (0) |
| 2021–2024 | Maccabi Netanya | 93 | (3) |
| 2024–2025 | D.C. United | 36 | (1) |
| 2026– | Beitar Jerusalem | 17 | (1) |

International career^{‡}
| 2018 | Cameroon U20 | 1 | (0) |
| 2024– | Cameroon | 1 | (1) |
- * Club domestic league appearances and goals as of 23 June 2026 ‡ National team caps and goals as of 14 October 2024

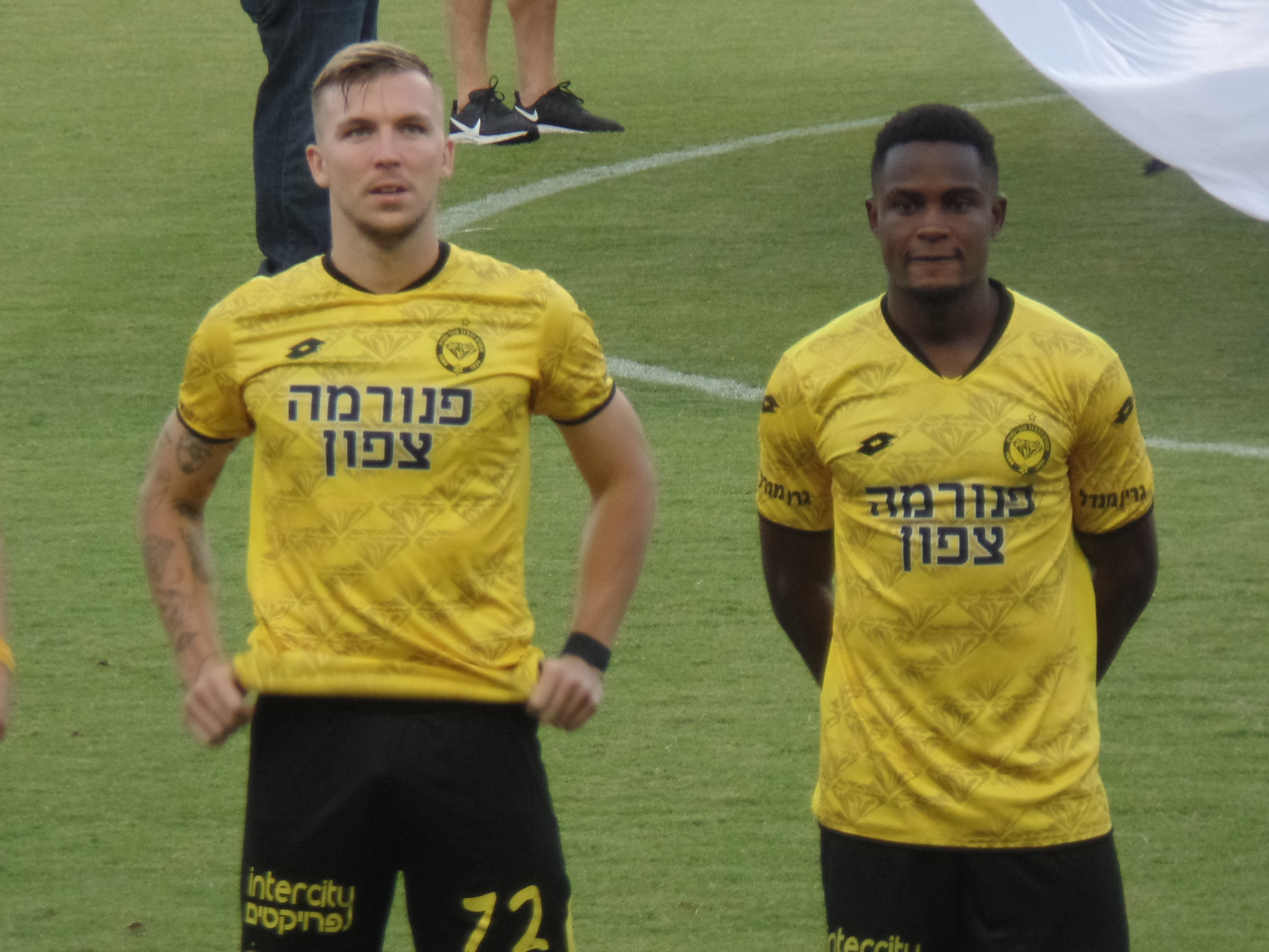
Boris Enow (right) and Eden Kartsev in 2022

Boris Enow Takang (born 30 March 2000) is a Cameroonian footballer who currently plays as a midfielder for Israeli Premier League club Beitar Jerusalem and the Cameroon national team.

== Career statistics ==
=== Club ===
As of 10 May 2025.

| Club | Season | League | | | National Cup | | League Cup | | Other | | Total | |
| Club | Season | Division | Apps | Goals | Apps | Goals | Apps | Goals | Apps | Goals | Apps | Goals |
|---|---|---|---|---|---|---|---|---|---|---|---|---|
| Porto B | 2019–20 | LigaPro | 14 | 1 | – | | – | | 0 | 0 | 14 | 1 |
| Lens B | 2020–21 | Championnat National 2 | 8 | 0 | – | | – | | 0 | 0 | 8 | 0 |
| Maccabi Netanya | 2021–22 | Ligat Ha`Al | 32 | 3 | 1 (Note: Appearance(s) in Israel State Cup) | 0 | 5 (Note: Appearances in Toto Cup AI) | 0 | 0 | 0 | 38 | 3 |
| Maccabi Netanya | 2022–23 | Ligat Ha`Al | 31 | 0 | 5 | 1 | 3 | 0 | 2 (Note: Appearances in UEFA Conference League) | 0 | 41 | 1 |
| Maccabi Netanya | 2023–24 | Ligat Ha`Al | 30 | 0 | 4 | 0 | 5 | 1 | 0 | 0 | 39 | 1 |
| Maccabi Netanya | Total | | 93 | 3 | 10 | 1 | 13 | 1 | 2 | 0 | 118 | 5 |
| D.C. United | 2024 | Major League Soccer | 7 | 0 | – | | – | | 1 (Note: Appearance in Leagues Cup) | 0 | 8 | 0 |
| D.C. United | 2025 | Major League Soccer | 10 | 1 | 1 (Note: Appearance in U.S. Open Cup) | 0 | — | | — | | 11 | 1 |
| D.C. United | Total | | 17 | 1 | 1 | 0 | 0 | 0 | 1 | 0 | 19 | 1 |
| Career total | | | 132 | 5 | 11 | 1 | 13 | 1 | 3 | 0 | 159 | 7 |

=== International ===
As of match played October 14, 2024

Appearances and goals by national team and year
| National team | Year | Apps | Goals |
|---|---|---|---|
Cameroon
| Cameroon | 2024 | 1 | 1 |
| Cameroon | Total | 1 | 1 |

As of October 14, 2024
Scores and results list Cameroon's goal tally first, score column indicates score after each Enow goal.

List of international goals scored by Boris Enow
| No. | Date | Venue | Opponent | Score | Result | Competition |
|---|---|---|---|---|---|---|
| 1 | October 14, 2024 | Mandela National Stadium, Kampala, Uganda | Kenya | 1–0 | 1–0 | 2025 Africa Cup of Nations qualification |
