= Juan Gómez (footballer, born 1992) =

Chilean footballer (born 1992)

Personal information
- Full name: Juan Andrés Gómez Medina
- Date of birth: 9 February 1992 (age 34)
- Place of birth: Rancagua, Chile
- Height: 1.82 m (5 ft 11 1/2 in)
- Position: Centre back

Team information
- Current team: O'Higgins
- Number: 27

Senior career*
Years	Team	Apps	(Gls)
2008–	O'Higgins	2	(0)
- * Club domestic league appearances and goals as of 18:50, 4 June 2011 (UTC)

Juan Andrés Gómez Medina (born 9 February 1992) is a Chilean footballer who currently plays for the Chilean Primera División side O'Higgins as a centre back.
