= Kim Joon-hong (footballer) =

South Korean footballer (born 2003)

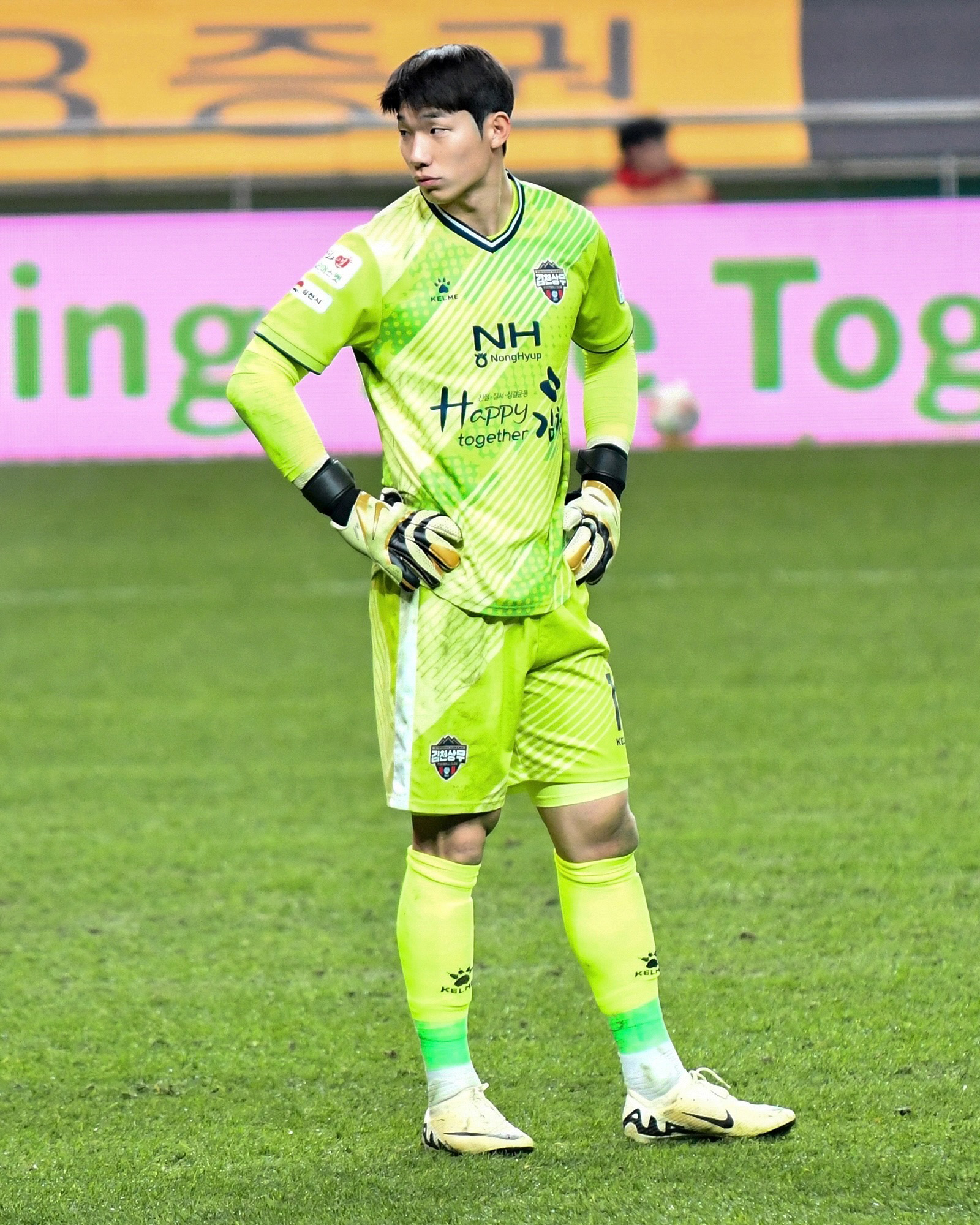
- Kim in 2024

Personal information
- Full name: Kim Joon-hong
- Date of birth: 3 June 2003 (age 23)
- Place of birth: Jeonju, Jeonbuk, South Korea
- Height: 1.90 m (6 ft 3 in)
- Position: Goalkeeper

Team information
- Current team: Suwon Samsung Bluewings
- Number: 30

Senior career*
Years	Team	Apps	(Gls)
2021–2024	Jeonbuk Hyundai Motors	19	(0)
2022	Jeonbuk Hyundai Motors B	10	(0)
2023–2024	→ Gimcheon Sangmu (draft)	25	(0)
2025–2026	D.C. United	8	(0)
2026	→ Suwon Samsung Bluewings (loan)	13	(0)
2026–	Suwon Samsung Bluewings	8	(0)

International career^{‡}
2019–2020	South Korea U17	4	(0)
2022–2023	South Korea U20	14	(0)
2025–	South Korea U23	8	(0)
Medal record
Men's football
Representing South Korea
Asian Games
Gold medal – first place	2026 Aichi–Nagoya
- * Club domestic league appearances and goals as of 29 August 2026 ‡ National team caps and goals as of 3 October 2026

- Kim Joon-hong
- Hangul: 김준홍
- Hanja: 金峻弘
- RR: Gim Junhong
- MR: Kim Chunhong

Kim Joon-hong (Korean: 김준홍; born 3 June 2003) is a South Korean professional footballer who plays as a goalkeeper for K League 2 club Suwon Samsung Bluewings.

== International career ==
In August 2023, Kim received his first call-up to the South Korea senior national team by head coach Jürgen Klinsmann, for two friendly matches against Wales and Saudi Arabia.

== Career statistics ==
=== Club ===
As of 29 August 2025.

Club	Season	League			National Cup (Note: Includes Korean FA Cup, U.S. Open Cup)		Continental		Other		Total	
Club	Season	Division	Apps	Goals	Apps	Goals	Apps	Goals	Apps	Goals	Apps	Goals
Jeonbuk Hyundai Motors	2021	K League 1	2	0	0	0	0	0	—		2	0
Jeonbuk Hyundai Motors	2022	K League 1	2	0	0	0	0	0	—		2	0
Jeonbuk Hyundai Motors	2024	K League 1	15	0	0	0	0	0	2 (Note: Appearances in K League promotion-relegation playoffs)	0	17	0
Jeonbuk Hyundai Motors	Total		19	0	0	0	0	0	2	0	21	0
Jeonbuk Hyundai Motors B	2022	K4 League	10	0	—		—		—		10	0
Gimcheon Sangmu (draft)	2023	K League 2	8	0	1	0	—		—		9	0
Gimcheon Sangmu (draft)	2024	K League 1	17	0	0	0	—		—		17	0
Gimcheon Sangmu (draft)	Total		25	0	0	0	0	0	2	0	26	0
D.C. United	2025	Major League Soccer	8	0	3	0	—		—		11	0
Suwon Samsung Bluewings (loan)	2026	K League 2	13	0	0	0	—		—		13	0
Suwon Samsung Bluewings	2026	K League 2	8	0	0	0	—		—		8	0
Career total			83	0	4	0	0	0	2	0	89	0

== Honours ==
Jeonbuk Hyundai Motors

- K League 1: 2021

Gimcheon Sangmu

- K League 2: 2023

South Korea U23

- Asian Games: 2026
