= Luis Barraza =

American soccer player (born 1996)

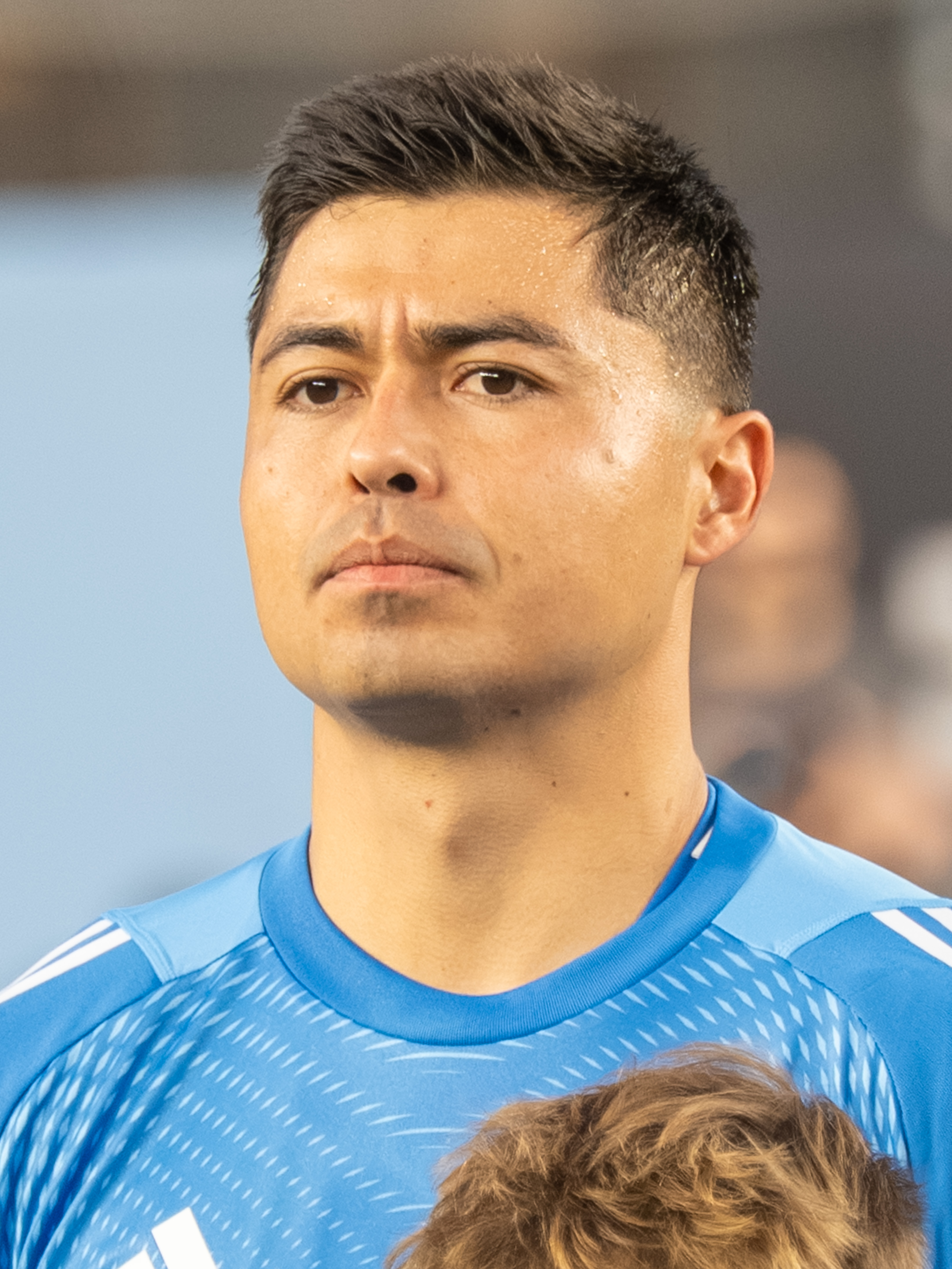
- Barraza with DC United in 2025

Personal information
- Full name: Luis Eduardo Barraza
- Date of birth: November 8, 1996 (age 30)
- Place of birth: Las Cruces, New Mexico, U.S.
- Height: 6 ft 2 in (1.88 m)
- Position: Goalkeeper

Team information
- Current team: Inter Miami
- Number: 13

Youth career
- 2012–2015: Real Salt Lake AZ

College career
Years	Team	Apps	(Gls)
2015–2018	Marquette Golden Eagles	53	(0)

Senior career*
Years	Team	Apps	(Gls)
2016	Lane United FC	5	(0)
2017	FC Tucson	1	(0)
2018	Chicago FC United	3	(0)
2019–2024	New York City FC	30	(0)
2021	→ Oakland Roots (loan)	2	(0)
2022–2024	→ New York City FC II (loan)	7	(0)
2025	D.C. United	24	(0)
2026–	Inter Miami	0	(0)
- * Club domestic league appearances and goals as of October 25, 2025

Luis Eduardo Barraza (born November 8, 1996) is an American professional soccer player who plays as a goalkeeper for Major League Soccer club Inter Miami.

== Club career ==
Born in Las Cruces, New Mexico, Barraza is of Mexican descent and spent his early career with the Real Salt Lake Arizona academy. He then enrolled at Marquette University where he represented the Marquette Golden Eagles from 2015 to 2018.

Whilst at college, Barraza also played in the USL League Two with Lane United FC, FC Tucson and Chicago FC United.

On January 11, 2019, Barraza was selected with the 12th overall pick at the 2019 MLS SuperDraft by New York City FC. He then signed a professional contract with the side on January 28, 2019. On December 15, 2020, almost two years since signing his professional deal, Barraza made his professional debut for New York City in a 4–0 loss against Tigres UANL in the CONCACAF Champions League.

On May 31, 2021, Barraza moved to USL Championship side Oakland Roots on loan.

== International career ==
Born in the United States to Mexican parents, Barraza holds a U.S. and Mexican citizenship, which makes him eligible to represent either the United States or Mexico.

== Career statistics ==
=== Club ===
As of match played May 10, 2025

Appearances and goals by club, season and competition
Club	Season	League			National cup		Continental		Other		Total	
Club	Season	Division	Apps	Goals	Apps	Goals	Apps	Goals	Apps	Goals	Apps	Goals
Lane United FC	2016	USL PDL	5	0	—		—		—		5	0
FC Tucson	2017	USL PDL	1	0	1	0	—		—		2	0
Chicago FC United	2018	USL PDL	3	0	—		—		—		3	0
New York City FC	2019	MLS	0	0	—		—		—		0	0
New York City FC	2020	MLS	—		—		1 (Note: Appearances in CONCACAF Champions League)	0	—		1	0
New York City FC	2021	MLS	5	0	—		—		—		5	0
New York City FC	2022	MLS	—		3	0	1 (Note: Appearance in Campeones Cup)	0	—		4	0
New York City FC	2023	MLS	24	0	—		—		1 (Note: Appearances in Leagues Cup)	0	25	0
New York City FC	2024	MLS	1	0	—		—		2	0	3	0
New York City FC	Total		30	0	3	0	2	0	3	0	38	0
Oakland Roots (loan)	2021	USL	2	0	—		–		–		2	0
New York City FC II (loan)	2022	MLS Next Pro	5	0	—		–		–		5	0
New York City FC II (loan)	2024	MLS Next Pro	2	0	—		–		–		2	0
New York City FC II (loan)	Total		7	0	0	0	0	0	0	0	7	0
D.C. United	2025	MLS	24	0	—		–		–		5	0
Career total			72	0	4	0	2	0	3	0	62	0

== Honors ==
New York City FC

- MLS Cup: 2021
- Campeones Cup: 2022

Inter Miami

- Campeones Cup: 2026
