= D.C. United =

American professional soccer club based in Washington, D.C.

- Nicknames: Black-and-Red; Eagles
- Founded: June 15, 1994; 32 years ago
- Stadium: Audi Field; Washington, D.C.
- Capacity: 20,000
- Owner: D.C. United Holdings
- Co-chairmen: Jason Levien; Stephen Kaplan
- Head coach: Óscar Pareja
- League: Major League Soccer
- 2026: Eastern Conference: 14th Overall: 28th Playoffs: Did not qualify
- Website: dcunited.com
Home colors	Away colors	Third colors

D.C. United is an American professional soccer club based in Washington, D.C. The club competes in Major League Soccer (MLS) as a member of the Eastern Conference. Domestically, the club has won four MLS Cups (league championships), four Supporters' Shields (league regular season), three U.S. Open Cups (domestic cups), and six Eastern Conference championships. In international competitions, the club has one CONCACAF Champions Cup title and one Copa Interamericana, the only team from the United States to win the latter. In terms of trophies won, it is the joint-most successful overall club in American soccer (tied with the LA Galaxy).

Founded in 1994, the club was an inaugural franchise in Major League Soccer, playing in the league since its first season in 1996. The club played a majority of its matches at Robert F. Kennedy Memorial Stadium from 1996 until 2017 before moving to the soccer-specific stadium, Audi Field, in 2018, where it has played since. D.C. United was one of the premier franchises in Major League Soccer, and in American soccer in the late 1990s, where it won the bulk of its trophies. Players such as Raúl Díaz Arce, Marco Etcheverry, Roy Lassiter, Jaime Moreno, Ben Olsen, and Eddie Pope, along with head coach, Bruce Arena, helped the club win eight of their 12 major titles from 1996 through 2000. The club would win an MLS Cup, a U.S. Open Cup, and two Supporters' Shield titles under Piotr Nowak and Tom Soehn in the mid-to-late 2000s. In 2013, under the management of Ben Olsen, the club won the U.S. Open Cup, its most recent major trophy.

Throughout the 2010s into the 2020s, the club went through mediocrity, with only one major trophy, and several missed playoff appearances, including multiple last place finishes in the league. During this time, some high-profile acquisitions joined United, including Wayne Rooney, and several homegrown players began making impacts on the United squad including Bill Hamid, Andy Najar, and Kevin Paredes.

Following the full sale of United from William Chang and Erick Thohir to Jason Levien in 2018, the club went into decline. After a string of poor seasons, Olsen was fired in 2020, after a ten-year tenure as head coach. Following Olsen's departure, United went through four head coaches in the span of six years, including Hernán Losada, Rooney, Troy Lesesne, and René Weiler. It is currently coached by Óscar Pareja.

== History ==
Before the 1994 FIFA World Cup, the United States Soccer Federation fulfilled its promise to FIFA by aiding in the foundation of a new professional league, which would become Major League Soccer (MLS). On June 15, 1994, MLS selected Washington, D.C. out of twenty-two applicants to host one of the league's first seven franchises, with three more added before the league's launch. The team's name was chosen as a reflection of the names of European clubs, such as Manchester United or Leeds United, as well as being the capital of the United States.

The team's colors and original logo, along with those of the other ten original teams, were announced in October 1995, during a presentation in New York City. Black and white were announced D.C. United's primary colors, and red was announced as the club's secondary color.

=== Early years and dynasty (1996–1999) ===
The club's first season was in 1996. Ahead of the season, United hired Bruce Arena, who had led the University of Virginia men's soccer program to five NCAA College Cup titles, to be the head coach of the club. Under Arena, the club quickly established itself as one of the flagship franchises in MLS, winning two MLS Cup (league championship) titles, a U.S. Open Cup (domestic cup) title, a Supporters' Shield (regular season winner), a CONCACAF Champions' Cup (continental championship), and a Copa Interamericana (intercontinental championship) all within the club's first two seasons. During this late 1990's dynasty, the club was led by its "magic triangle" of Jaime Moreno, Marco Etcheverry, and Raul Diaz Arce. Additionally, the club had several U.S. international stars at the time including Eddie Pope, John Harkes, and Jeff Agoos. United's inaugural match was played on April 6, 1996, against the then-called San Jose Clash (now Earthquakes) at Spartan Stadium in San Jose, California, which also was the first match to ever be played in MLS history. United would lose the match to the Clash, 0–1 off a late match-winner by Eric Wynalda. However, the season was hallmarked by the Arena leading the team to the first domestic double in modern U.S. soccer history by beating the Los Angeles Galaxy in the first MLS Cup and the Rochester Raging Rhinos of the USL First Division in the 1996 U.S. Open Cup. The club's early success continued into 1997, repeating as MLS Cup champions, and winning their first Supporters' Shield, becoming the first club in MLS history to achieve the "league double" by winning both the regular season championship and league championship.

In 1998 the club won the Eastern Conference regular season and postseason championship, but finished runners-up for the Supporters' Shield, and lost to Chicago Fire in MLS Cup 1998. Despite not winning any domestic titles, the club managed to win the CONCACAF Champions' Cup (now known as the CONCACAF Champions League), defeating Mexican side, Toluca, in the final thanks to a Pope goal, as well as winning the now-defunct Copa Interamericana (a two-legged aggregate series between the CONCACAF and CONMEBOL club champions). D.C. United became the first American club to win a CONCACAF club championship, and the only American club to have won the Copa Interamericana. As of 2022, only two other American clubs have won the CONCACAF Champions' Cup or Champions League (LA Galaxy in 2000 and Seattle Sounders in 2022).

In October 1998, Arena left D.C. United to accept the head coaching role for the United States men's national soccer team, following their poor performance in the 1998 FIFA World Cup. Dutch manager, Thomas Rongen, who had previously coached the New England Revolution was hired to coach United for the 1999 season. With the squad, largely constructed by Arena, United achieved a domestic double, winning MLS Cup 1999 (their third MLS Cup title) against their cross-country rivals, the Los Angeles Galaxy, a rematch of MLS Cup 1996, and winning their second Supporters' Shield title (off of 57 points). Striker Roy Lassiter led United with 18 goals during the season earning joint Golden Boot honors. United did not fare as well in the 1999 CONCACAF Champions' Cup, losing in the semifinals to eventual champions, Necaxa.

=== Playoff failures (2000–2003) ===
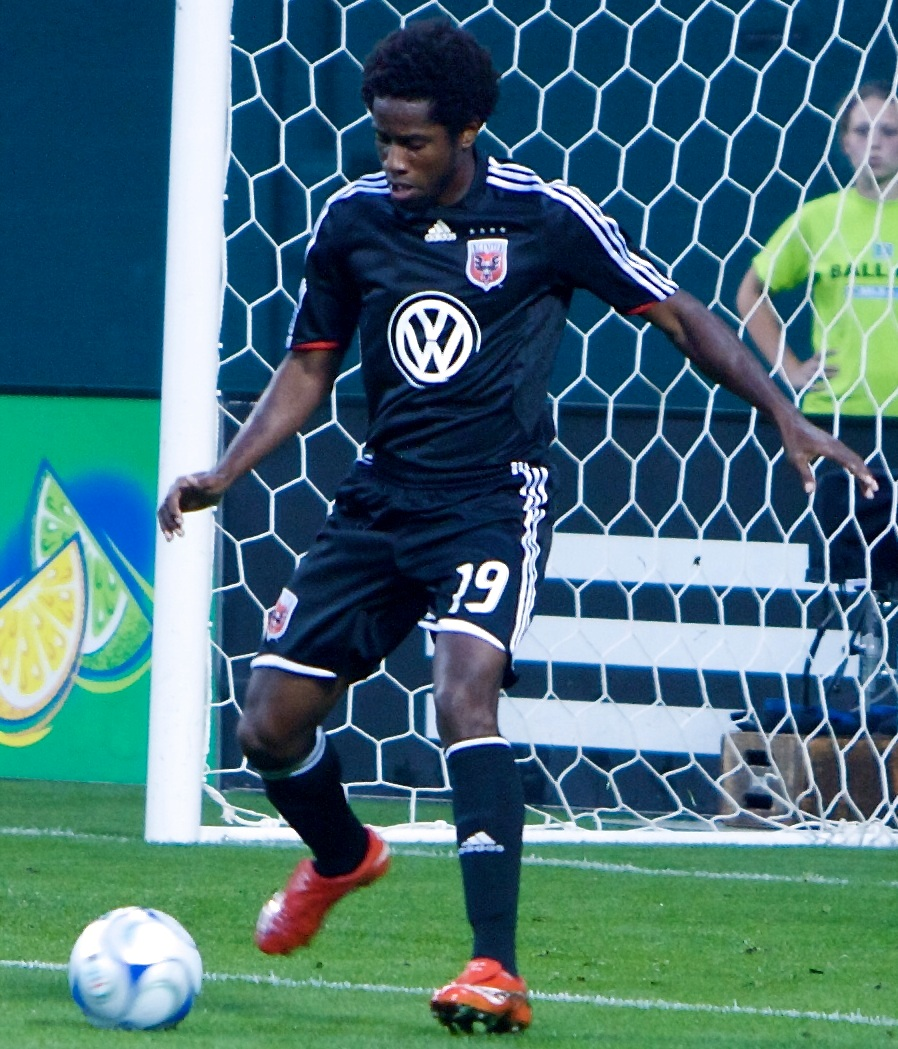
Clyde Simms

Ultimately, Arena's departure marked the beginning of a downturn in the team's fortunes. After reaching MLS Cup for the club's first four seasons, the 2000 season saw the club lose nine of their first twelve matches. United ultimately finished in 11th out of 12 teams in MLS during the 2000 season, missing the 2000 MLS Cup Playoffs altogether, for the first time in franchise history. Outside of MLS play, the club suffered early exits in the CONCACAF Champions' Cup, losing in the semifinals to eventual champions, the LA Galaxy, and being knocked out in the quarterfinals of the U.S. Open Cup by eventual finalists, Miami Fusion.

During the 2001 season, United played in the CONCACAF Giants Cup which was held in March 2001, prior to the start of the MLS regular season. United reached the finals of the Giants Cup, beating Jamaican club, Arnett Gardens, and Guatemalan club, Comunicaciones in the quarterfinals and semifinals, respectively, before losing to Mexican club, América, in the final. During the 2001 MLS regular season United once again, finished in last place in the Eastern Conference and 11 points outside of the playoff picture. Although the offense led by Abdul Thompson Conteh, and Jamie Moreno contributed to 42 goals on the season, the porous United defense let in 50 goals the second worst in the East. The season however, was truncated by three weeks due to the aftermath of the September 11 attacks. Following the 2001 season, club management decided to fire Rongen, and replace him with English manager Ray Hudson, who had just coached the Miami Fusion to a Supporters' Shield title.

Hudson signed a two-season contract with United and began the 2002 season participating in the 2002 CONCACAF Champions' Cup, due to their performance in the previous years' Giants Cup. United suffered their worst loss in CONCACAF play, losing by a four-goal margin to Comunicaciones, a club they had beat the previous year in the Giants Cup. United won the return leg, but by too little of a margin to advance. Their fortunes during the regular season did not fare better than the previous two seasons, where United ultimately finished last in the MLS regular season overall table, their first Wooden Spoon finish in franchise history, and their worst season until 2010. United scored only 31 goals during the season, last in MLS, where Ali Curtis and Bobby Convey were joint top scorers with the club, with only five goals each. However, the season showed signs of promising young talent with then-17 year old, Santino Quaranta, having a breakout season with United, and Nick Rimando, who became the club's first-choice goalkeeper for the next five years.

Ahead of the 2003 season, United received the first overall draft pick in the 2003 MLS SuperDraft, where they selected University of Virginia standout, Alecko Eskandarian. Additionally, United brought in MLS veterans, Dema Kovalenko and Hristo Stoichkov, from Chicago Fire. After a slow start to the season taking eight matches to win, United gained momentum during the latter half of the season, going 8–5–5 to close out the season. The form allowed United to qualify for the playoffs as the final seed, giving United their first playoff berth since 1999. Despite the berth, United was blanked by Shield winners Chicago Fire 4–0 on aggregate. At the conclusion of the season, despite signs of promise, Hudson was released by D.C. United and Polish manager, Piotr Nowak, replaced him before the start of the 2004 season.

=== Nowak era, return to success (2004–2006) ===
The club's first season under Nowak was marred by injuries in the early going, and some players were known to have complained about Nowak's methods. During Nowak's tenue, United selected Freddy Adu, a 14-year-old soccer prodigy, in the 2004 MLS SuperDraft. When Adu entered United's regular-season opener as a second-half substitute on April 3, 2004, he became the youngest player in any professional sport in the United States since 1887. That season, Adu, along with the likes of Christian Gómez, Moreno, and Brian Carroll, helped to propel United into the playoffs as the second seed in the East. There they advanced past the New England Revolution in the Eastern Conference Final on penalty kicks in what has been called one of the best games in MLS history. United then defeated the Kansas City Wizards to win MLS Cup 2004, their fourth, and as of 2026, their most recent MLS Cup title.

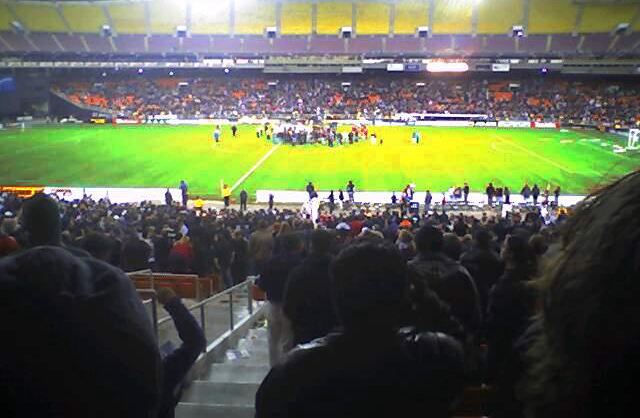
D.C. United won the 2004 Eastern Conference championship in what has been called one of the best games in MLS history.

Following their 2004 MLS Cup triumph, the club spent the next four seasons as one of the top clubs in MLS. In 2005, the club again made MLS history by becoming the first United States–based team to participate in Copa Sudamericana, entering in the Round of sixteen. In 2006, the MLS All-Star Team, which included eight United players, was managed by United's manager Piotr Nowak, defeated English champions Chelsea. In 2006 United won their third Supporters' Shield title.

=== Soehn era, U.S. Open Cup title (2007–2009) ===
Nowak left United as head coach to become an assistant under Bob Bradley with the United States men's national soccer team. Nowak was replaced by his assistant Tom Soehn, who coached the club starting in 2007. The 2007 squad, largely built by Nowak, had a historically successful regular season in MLS. Led by the likes of Luciano Emilio, Fred, Ben Olsen, and Christian Gómez, United finished the regular season atop the MLS table, winning the Supporters' Shield for a then-MLS record fourth time, and for the second consecutive season. Finishing the season with 55 points in 30 games, United set a club record in points per game (1.8), and lead the league in total goals (56). It was the first time in MLS history a franchise won the Shield in consecutive seasons. Outside of MLS play during the 2007 season, the club participated in the CONCACAF Champions' Cup, reaching the semifinals; the Copa Sudamericana, being eliminated in the opening round; the North American SuperLiga, reaching the quarterfinals; and the U.S. Open Cup, being eliminated in the third round. In September 2007, Dave Kasper was promoted from the club's Technical Director to the team's General Manager, which as of 2022, is a position he still holds.

Following the 2007 season, the club failed to qualify for the MLS Cup Playoffs for five consecutive seasons. During this stretch, United's lone major title came in 2008, when they won the U.S. Open Cup. In league play during the 2008 and 2009 campaigns, United faltered at the tail-end of each season, ultimately causing them to miss out on the playoffs. Following the end of the 2009 campaign, Soehn resigned as head coach of United, thus ending the Soehn era with two major titles in three seasons. To date, Soehn is the most recent manager at United to win two or more major titles during their tenure as head coach.

=== Olsen era (2010–2020) ===
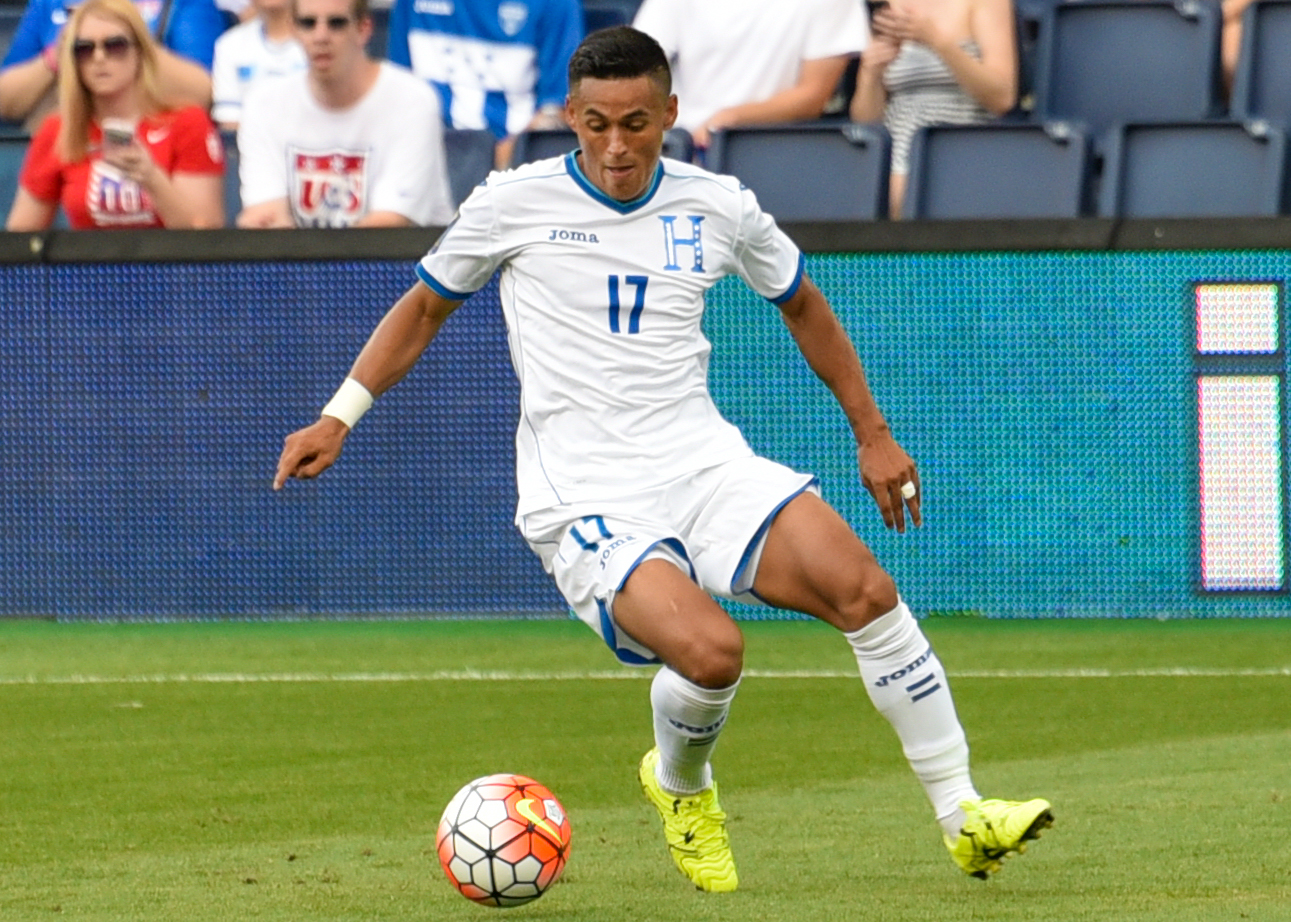
Andy Najar (pictured), was one of the first Homegrown Players in D.C. United history. Najar won the 2010 Rookie of the Year Award.

Following Soehn's replacement, the organization hired Curt Onalfo as the head coach. United had approached then University of Akron men's soccer head coach, Caleb Porter, but Porter rejected their offer. Recently retired club midfielder, Ben Olsen, joined Onalfo's staff as an assistant coach, along with Kris Kelderman, who served as an assistant to Onfalo at Kansas City. Additionally, Soehn's assistant coaches of Chad Ashton and Mark Simpson remained on Onalfo's coaching staff for the 2010 season. Ahead of the season the club saw the departures of Luciano Emilio and Fred, two key contributors to the club during the late 2000s. The club, marred by injuries, and poor tactics, had a historically poor start to the 2010 MLS season, having a record of 3–12–3 in the clubs first 16 matches.

In August 2010, United fired Onalfo and named Ben Olsen as the club's interim manager for the remainder of the 2010 season. The club would finish the season out with a 3–8–1 record, finishing with a historically poor 6–20–4 record, the worst in MLS during the 2010 season. During the 2010 season, the highlights of the season included the rise of two homegrown signings, Bill Hamid, who took over as starting goalkeeper to Troy Perkins during the season, and became the club's first choice goalkeeper throughout the 2010s, along with Andy Najar, who won the MLS Rookie of the Year Award (now Young Player of the Year), becoming the first homegrown player to win the honor. Following the end of the 2010 season, long-time United striker Jamie Moreno retired from professional soccer.

Olsen would ultimately assume full-time managerial duties ahead of the 2011 season, where he kept Ashton on the coaching staff, but dismissed Kelderman from his staff. Olsen brought in recently retired goalkeeper and former Canadian international, Pat Onstad, on to his coaching staff, along with former Dutch international, Sonny Silooy. Throughout Olsen's tenure, he employed a defensive style of play, followed by a diamond 4–4–2 formation focused on counter-attacking soccer. Pundits described the play as "Bennyball", and a soccer-style form of moneyball. During Olsen's coaching career, he would qualify for the playoffs six times, with the furthest being the Eastern Conference final, and win one major title, the U.S. Open Cup in 2013. The club qualified for the CONCACF Champions League twice during his tenure, where they reached the quarterfinals each time.

During Olsen's first full season in charge the club acquired Perry Kitchen in the 2011 MLS SuperDraft, U.S. international Charlie Davies on loan, and Canadian international Dwayne De Rosario. Additionally, 2010 Designated Player acquisition, Branko Bošković, became healthy for the season. The club experienced a turnaround in contrast to 2010, but ultimately a four-match losing streak and a six-match winless streak to close out the regular season cost the club a chance at the MLS Cup Playoffs. Despite not making the playoffs, De Rosario won the MLS Most Valuable Player Award (now known as the Landon Donovan MVP Award). During the 2011–12 offseason, minority owners of the Philadelphia 76ers basketball team, Jason Levien and Erick Thohir were named new majority owners, buying Will Chang's majority stake in the club. Chang, however, remained part of the ownership group as a minority owner. The goal of Levien and Thohir was to construct a soccer-specific stadium for United.

On the field during the 2012 season, United's fortunes fared much better, with new acquisitions Nick DeLeon, Lewis Neal, Maicon Santos, and Hamdi Salihi having immediate contributions to the club. United ultimately finish the 2012 season with a third-place finish, their best since 2007, and a second-place finish in the East, again their best since 2007. The club defeated their rivals, New York Red Bulls in the Conference Semifinals, before advancing to the MLS Eastern Conference final, their first Conference Final since 2005, against Houston Dynamo. United lost the series 2–4 on aggregate ending their season.

During Olsen's third season in charge, the new club ownership constrained the teams budget, in part to finance a future soccer-specific stadium. Consequently, the club relied on several reserve players, second-division players, and Academy players to form the core of the team, as well as releasing several key contributors from the 2012 team, in order to stay within budget. As a result, D.C. United tallied a total of only three wins in the 2013 season, setting a record for fewest wins in league history. Despite the team's poor showing in league play, D.C. United defeated Real Salt Lake in the U.S. Open Cup final thanks to a late first half goal from Lewis Neal. As of 2022, this is the club's most recent major honor. Despite this season, Olsen was retained as head coach, in part, due in part to the fact the club won the Open Cup. The Open Cup title gave United a berth into the 2014–15 CONCACAF Champions League, their first Champions League appearance since 2009.

In 2014, D.C. United executed a historic turnaround by clinching first place in the Eastern Conference, and going undefeated in CONCACAF Champions League group play, the first time an American club went undefeated in Group Stage of the Champions League. The Eastern Conference regular season title earned the team its second consecutive Champions League berth. Despite this, the club was eliminated by their rivals, New York Red Bulls, in the Conference Semifinals of the MLS Cup Playoffs. Notable offseason acquisitions included Steve Birnbaum, Chris Rolfe, Fabian Espindola, Sean Franklin, and Bobby Boswell. At the conclusion of the 2014 season, Olsen won the MLS Coach of the Year Award (now known as the Sigi Schmid Coach of the Year Award). For the turnaround, management extended Olsen's contract with United.

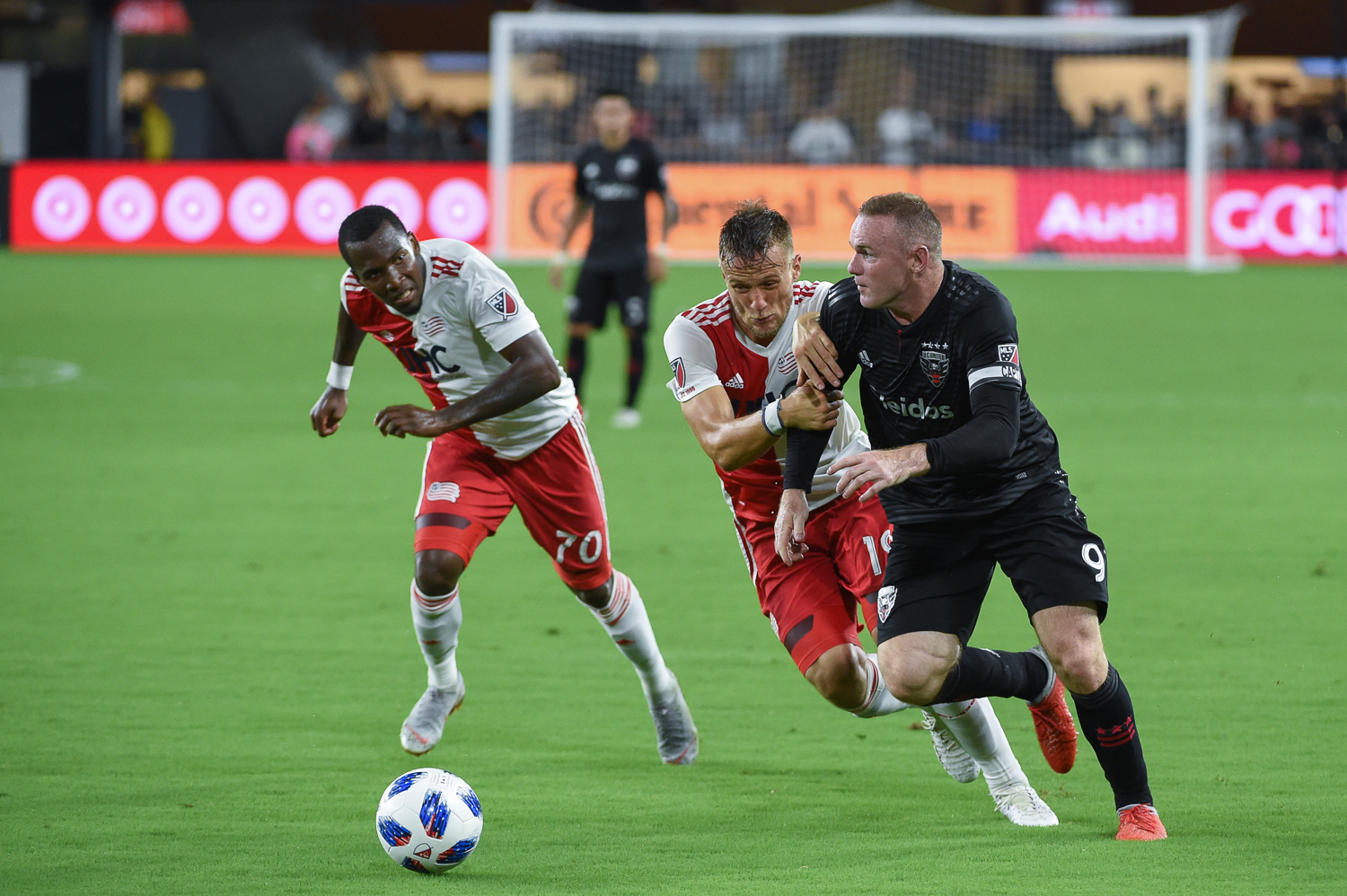
Wayne Rooney (pictured), led the team in scoring during the 2018 and 2019 seasons.

During the latter half of Olsen's tenure, Olsen saw the club qualify for the playoffs in four of his final six seasons, although the club never went further past the Conference Semifinals in the playoffs. During this time, the club revealed a new crest in 2016, and opened their new soccer-specific, Audi Field, in 2018. Off the field, Chang and Thohir sold their ownership stake to Levien in 2016 and 2018, respectively. In the late 2010s the club signed several notable players such as Wayne Rooney, Luciano Acosta, and Paul Arriola. During the shortened 2020 season due to the COVID-19 pandemic, United saw themselves have an early group stage exit during the MLS is Back tournament, coupled with a poor run of play during the fall 2020 segment of the season.

In October 2020, club management relieved Ben Olsen of his coaching duties, after a club-record 10 seasons as the head coach of the team. Olsen became the third-longest tenured head coach for an MLS team in league history, and by far, the longest tenured head coach in United history. While some members of the media felt that the dismissal was necessary, some individuals in the media felt that as long as Kasper was General Manager and Levien owned the franchise that little would change. Following the dismissal, it was reported that Olsen may stay with the United organization in a different role. Ultimately, in September 2021, Olsen was hired as the Club President for the Washington Spirit, the National Women's Soccer League franchise in the Washington metropolitan area, which he held until May 2022.

=== 2021–present ===
During the 2021 season, United hired Argentine manager, Hernán Losada, who had previously coached Belgian outfit, Beerschot. The decision came after the ownership decided to not hire Chris Armas as head coach. The media found the hire a unique and ambitious hire. As head coach, Losada moved the team away from a counter-attacking defensive style, and focused more on a high-octane, attacking style, where Losada prioritized fitness and speed, putting intense pressure on the opponents defense. Losada only managed the club for the entirety of the 2021 season, where on the final day of the season, they finished just outside of the playoff spot. Despite this, Losada remained in charge of United for the first two months of the 2022 campaign. However, due to disagreements between the front office and Losada in coaching philosophy, as well as a poor string of league results, Losada was fired in April 2022 after coaching the club for about 14 months.

Several United players later spoke publicly about Losada's poor communication with players, and strict dietary regulations, which had caused tension between the players and Losada's coaching staff. Management felt that Losada was too critical of the front office, particularly of Dave Kasper and Jason Levien, and that the relationship between coaching staff and the front office staff had been strained. During this time off the field, Mario Mims and Mark Ingram II joined D.C. United Holdings as minority owners.

Losada's firing sparked anger from some of D.C. United's fans, who felt the dismissal was too premature. Following Losada's sacking, long-time assistant coach Chad Ashton took over on interim duties until July 2022, when the club hired former player and former English international player Wayne Rooney to coach the club. The 2022 season ended in United finishing at the bottom of the MLS overall table, resulting in General Manager, Lucy Rushton, being relieved of her duties. During the 2023 season, United's record improved, finishing with 40 points on the season, up from 27 the previous season. However, the improvement was not enough to qualify for the 2023 MLS Cup Playoffs, resulting in Rooney's dismissal. On November 20, 2023, United named Ally Mackay as their new GM and Chief of soccer operations. Shortly after, on January 10, 2024, it was announced that Troy Lesesne had signed a three-year contract to serve as the club's head coach. The fact that Lesesne had been rejected as not good enough by prime rival Red Bulls did not sit well with many fans, and in fact, in his first season, United finished the season with 40 points once again, missing out on playoffs by goal differential. The lone highlight from the season being Benteke's 23 goal haul on the season, earning the D.C. United captain the 2024 MLS Golden Boot.

The 2025 season ended in another last-place finish, and Lesesne was fired in July after just 4 wins from 21 games. Swiss coach René Weiler was hired as his replacement in August and saw out the rest of the season. Mackay was also dismissed in September and replaced by Erkut Sogut. The poor finish led to fans and the press to call for Levien and Kaplan to sell the club. 2026 brought slightly improved results, with the team staying involved in the playoff race through September before collapsing and losing 7 of their final 8 games to finish second from bottom. Weiler was fired one week after the season's end and replaced by former Orlando City coach Óscar Pareja.

== Colors and badge ==
The team's colors and original logo were announced on October 17, 1995, along with those of the other ten original teams during a presentation in New York City. Black and white are D.C. United's primary colors, though the team's nickname is the "Black-and-Red." Red is used to accent the home jersey, while white is the main color of the team's road uniform. The three stripes along the shoulder – in white at home and black on the road – do not represent the three jurisdictions of the Washington Metropolitan Area (Washington, D.C., Maryland, and Virginia); rather, they represent the fact that the team's uniforms are made by Adidas. In 2011, the team introduced a predominantly red third uniform with black accents to be worn four or more times in the season. The team has also previously used white road uniforms with red stripes; white and red are the colors of the flag of Washington, D.C., and the stripes are also reminiscent of those used on the flag.

The team's original shield was implemented in 1996, consisting of the team's name, D.C. United, above a black bald eagle facing right on a red field, clawing three soccer balls overlaid on three white stars. The three stars and balls were intended to represent the region's three jurisdictions. The bird, associated with the federal government based in Washington, D.C., symbolizes many of the attributes of the team, including speed and power. The logo was redesigned before the 1998 season. This second logo design reoriented the eagle facing left and removed the three stars below it, whose metaphor was retained by three raised wing feathers. At the center of the eagle is a single gold-colored star and a soccer ball, which represents the team's victory in Major League Soccer's inaugural cup in 1996. Beginning in 2005, the logo could be adorned with four silver stars above it, representing the MLS Cups the team has won.

On December 10, 2015, D.C. United unveiled an updated logo designed by Peter Horridge, featuring a D.C. flag-inspired design across the eagle, an updated wordmark, and more dynamic wings.

=== Sponsorship ===
Season	Kit manufacturer	Shirt sponsor	Ref.
1996–2001	Adidas	Mastercard	
2002–2004	Adidas	—	
2005–2007	Adidas	Sierra Mist	
2008–2013	Adidas	Volkswagen	
2014–2021	Adidas	Leidos	
2022–2023	Adidas	XDC Network	
2024–present	Adidas	Guidehouse	

Consulting firm Guidehouse was announced as the jersey sponsor in a multi-year partnership on February 15, 2024.

== Stadium ==
=== RFK Stadium (1996–2017) ===
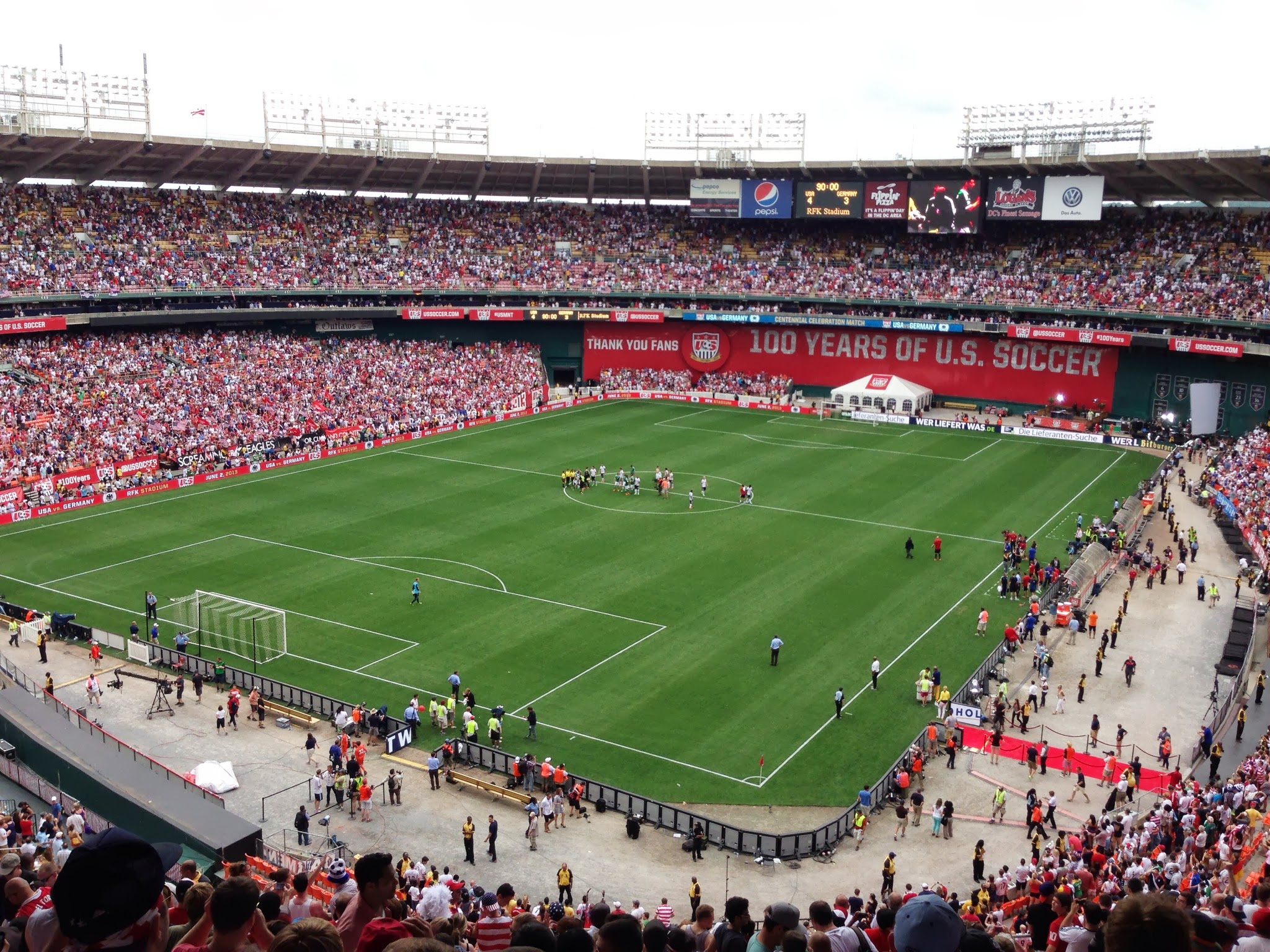
RFK Stadium was the first home to D.C. United

Robert F. Kennedy Memorial Stadium (RFK) was home to D.C. United, from the club's inaugural season in 1996, until the end of the 2017 season. The D.C. United Training Complex is located north of the stadium, and is where the Reserve Division team plays.

RFK was built in 1961 as a dual-use stadium for baseball and American football. Before 1996, it occasionally hosted soccer matches, including the 1980 Soccer Bowl, the 1993 Supercoppa Italiana, and five matches during the 1994 FIFA World Cup. When the Washington Nationals baseball team shared the field from 2005 to 2007, there were criticisms about the playing surface and the field's dimensions.

=== Audi Field (2018–present) ===
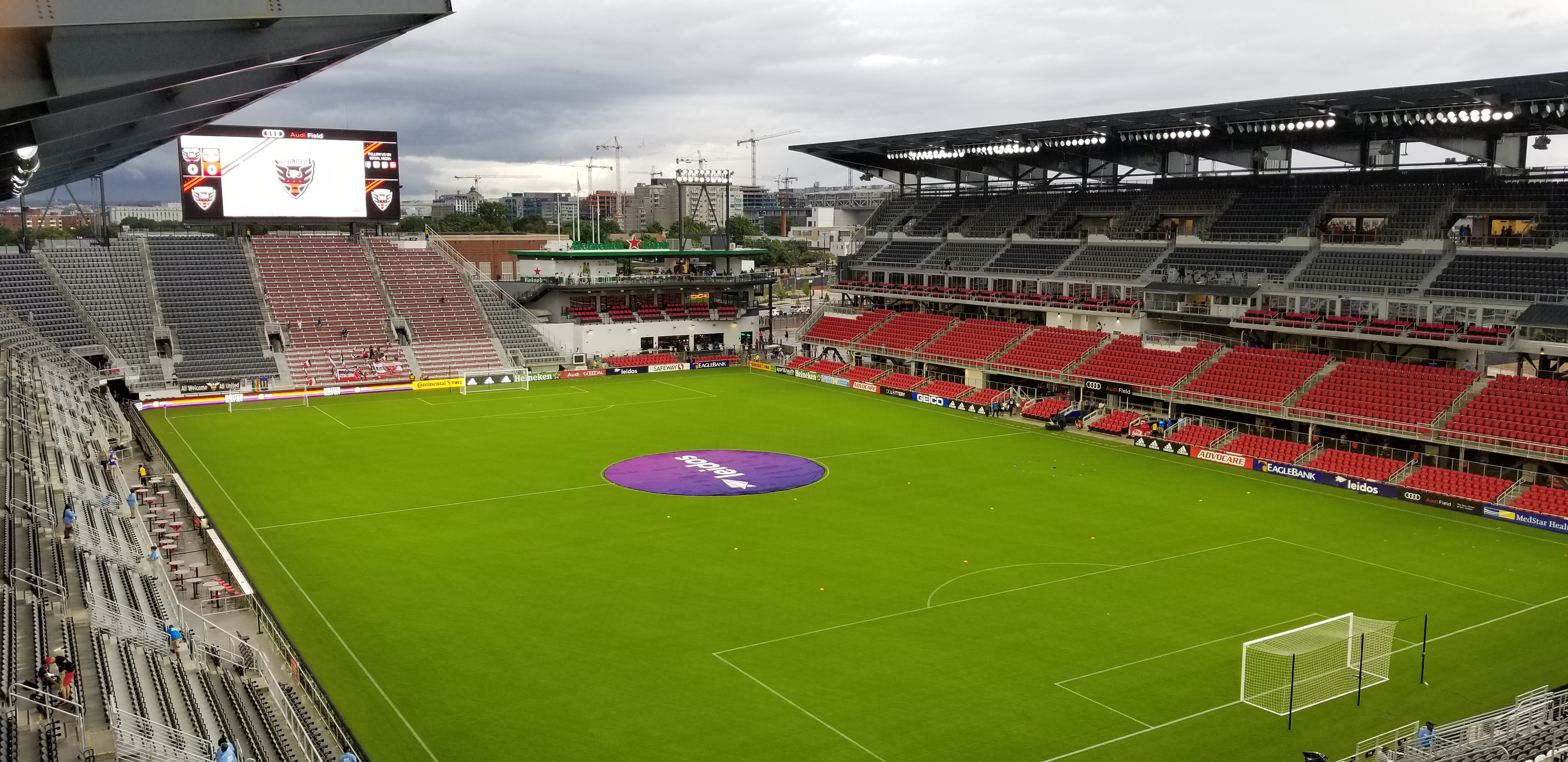
D.C. United moved to Audi Field in 2018

Audi Field is a soccer-specific stadium at Buzzard Point in Southwest, Washington, D.C., and has a capacity of 20,000. It hosted its first game against Vancouver Whitecaps FC on July 14, 2018. The stadium's naming rights are owned by Audi, who signed a 12-year contract in February 2017. It was designed by Populous and Marshall Moya Design. At the new stadium, tailgating spaces were eliminated so that fans would have to buy drinks and food inside the stadium, where management would get a share of the revenues.

Plans for a new stadium dated back to July 2006, when D.C. United proposed building a new stadium along the Anacostia River near Anacostia Park, but disputes with the city government forced the team to consider other sites.

The tentative deal for the stadium was announced on July 25, 2013, which would see a 20,000–25,000-seat stadium built on the site, costing $300 million. It was signed into law on December 30, 2014. Groundbreaking began on February 27, 2017, and the ribbon cutting was on July 9, 2018.

=== Other stadiums ===
Several regional university stadiums have been used by the team for Lamar Hunt U.S. Open Cup matches, including Klöckner Stadium in Charlottesville, Virginia, in 1996, and George Mason Stadium in Fairfax, Virginia, in 2010. Similarly, the team has also used the Maryland SoccerPlex in Germantown, Maryland, for multiple early-round games in U.S. Open Cup and CONCACAF Champions' Cup since it opened in 2001. On April 14, 2018, D.C. United played an MLS game against Columbus Crew SC at the Navy–Marine Corps Memorial Stadium in Annapolis, Maryland, while Audi Field was being constructed. Exhibition games, as well as occasional regular season matches, have also been played in nearby FedExField in Landover, Maryland; the latter have generally been played as part of doubleheaders featuring friendlies between national teams or foreign clubs.

== Club culture ==
=== Supporters and mascot ===
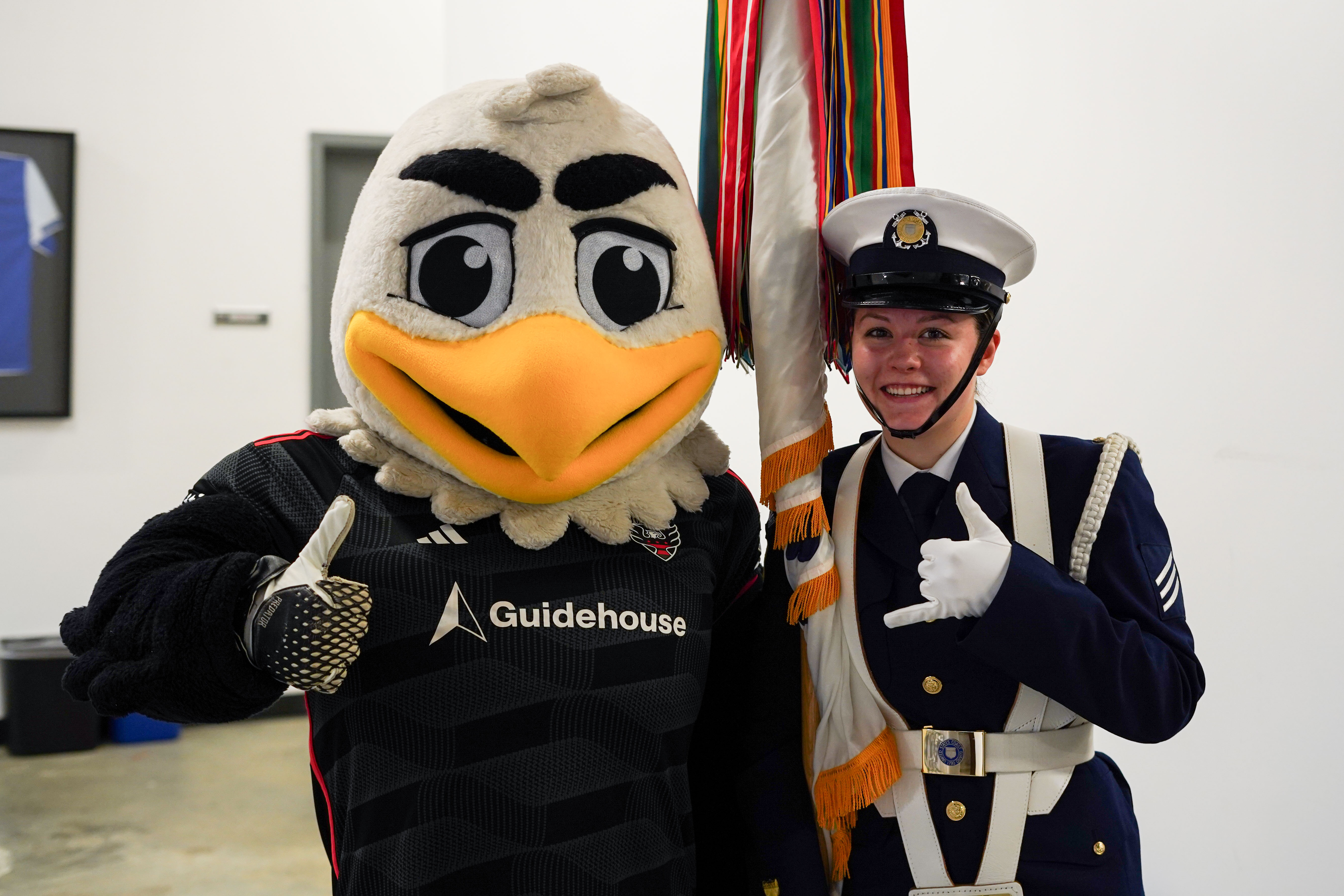
D.C. United's mascot, Talon.

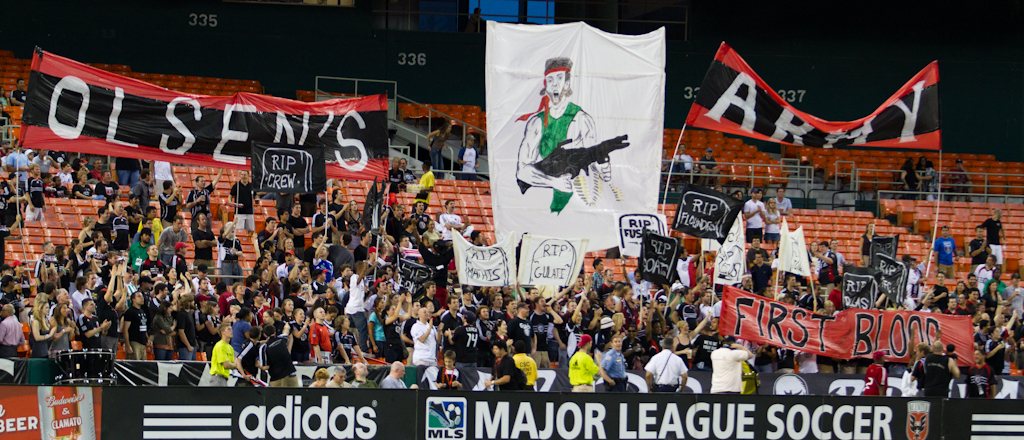
Supporters display a tifo supporting head coach Ben Olsen (drawn to lampoon Rambo) during a regular season match against FC Dallas

D.C. United has six major supporters groups; La Barra Brava, the Screaming Eagles, District Ultras, Rose Room Collective, 202 Unique and La Banda del Distrito. At RFK Stadium, the supporters groups were given space on the sideline opposite the team side of the field, but at Audi Field six groups were placed in cheaper seats, the safe standing sections together at the north end of Audi Field. La Barra Brava, Spanish for "The Brave Fans", was founded in 1995 by Latino fans in the Washington, D.C. area, mostly Bolivian immigrants in support of original United players Marco Etcheverry and Jaime Moreno. They seek to bring a South American style to home games.

La Norte (also La Curva Norte or The Northside) was a soccer supporters' club affiliated with D.C. United from 2001 to 2016. The club was founded in 2001 when members of La Barra Brava left section 135 of RFK Stadium to form a new club. The club was originally situated in section 120 of RFK, as the section sat directly behind the north goal. The club takes its name from their preferred location on the north side of the stadium. La Norte were forced to change sections with the arrival of the Washington Nationals baseball franchise, and the subsequent reconfiguration of RFK Stadium's seating to accommodate a baseball diamond. La Norte has since merged with the District Ultras and occupied sections 127 and 128 at RFK Stadium prior to the team's move to Audi Field.

D.C. United's mascot is Talon, an anthropomorphic bald eagle.

=== Rivalries ===
D.C. United's primary rival is the New York Red Bulls. The two teams compete annually for the Atlantic Cup, a competition instituted by the two clubs. The cup is awarded to the team that gets the most points across the teams' meetings throughout the season. D.C. United also has a rivalry with the New England Revolution. D.C. United also has a burgeoning rivalry with the Philadelphia Union as the two teams represent two cities separated by only 120 miles. D.C. United is also unique among MLS teams for its rivalry with the Charleston Battery of the United Soccer League, as they compete every time they face one another for the Coffee Pot Cup, a trophy established by the two sides' supporters.

== Ownership ==
When the league was founded in 1995, billionaire investor George Soros was the primary financial backer and director of Washington Soccer L.P., the group that owned the operating rights to D.C. United. Kevin Payne, former President of Soccer USA Partners and current CEO of D.C. United, was instrumental in organizing this ownership group. By 1998 the group was looking for new investors. On February 15, 2001, it agreed to sell the team to Anschutz Entertainment Group (AEG), founded by Colorado billionaire Philip Anschutz, with AEG exercising its option to become the sole investor-operator on January 8, 2002. AEG, who also owned MLS's Los Angeles Galaxy and Houston Dynamo, ran the team until 2007.

In May 2007, United entered into an initial one-year strategic partnership with the Brazilian club Atlético Mineiro. The partnership's goal is to enhance the sporting and commercial success of the respective clubs by sharing expertise and experience and creating new opportunities for the clubs in both areas.

On January 8, 2007, the operating rights to D.C. United were sold to D.C. United Holdings, a newly formed group venture that included real estate developer Victor MacFarlane, founder of MacFarlane Partners, and William H.C. Chang, chairman of Westlake International Group. Other investors included D.C. United president Kevin Payne and Blue Devil Development, headed by former Duke basketball players Brian Davis and Christian Laettner. In April 2009, Victor MacFarlane sold his share of the team to his partner William Chang after two stadium proposals had fallen through. In October 2009, Chang also bought out Davis and Laettner to control 100% of the team. Chang is also one of the primary investors of Major League Baseball's San Francisco Giants. In July 2012, Indonesian businessman Erick Thohir and Washington-area sports executive Jason Levien, minority owners of the Philadelphia 76ers National Basketball Association franchise, joined Chang as partners. Thohir and Levien stated their primary goals are to make United a global brand and build a soccer-specific stadium for the club. In October 2016, Thohir bought out Chang's remaining 35% stake. Then in August 2018, Levien bought out Thohir's stake, making him the current majority owner of the team.

On June 4, 2021, NFL running back Mark Ingram II joined DC United's ownership group as an investor.

In 2021, Rapper Yo Gotti became a minority owner of D.C United. Local investor and entrepreneur Devin Talbott joined the ownership group in 2022.

== Broadcasting ==
=== Television ===
As with all MLS teams, D.C. United matches are streamed worldwide with English and Spanish commentary on Apple TV under a contract running from the 2023 through 2028–29 seasons. Fox Sports may elect to pick up matches for linear television.

NBC Sports Washington held local television rights from the team's inception in 1996 through 2015, dating back to its time as Comcast SportsNet and Home Team Sports. The play-by-play commentator for this entire time was Dave Johnson. In the final three-year deal, which was not completed until five games into the 2013 season, it was to show a minimum of 16 matches per season. The team became frustrated that late-season and playoff matches were often relegated to NBCSW's overflow channel or not televised at all due to scheduling conflicts with the Washington Capitals and Washington Wizards, leading them to conclude a new deal with Sinclair Broadcast Group for the 2016 season. Sinclair placed matches on its local cable channel WJLA 24/7 News and served two stints as D.C. United's television partner, covering the 2016 through 2018 seasons as well as 2020.

For the 2019 season, D.C. United sold their local rights to subscription over-the-top service FloSports rather than a television broadcaster. The team signed a $12 million contract for four years, marking the first time it collected a substantial rights fee for its local games. The deal was controversial, as fans and the media balked at the high subscription price and criticized the team for shutting out casual fans and public viewings. Technical issues marred early broadcasts, and FloSports promised additional soccer broadcasts and shoulder programming to justify its subscription fee that largely never materialized. D.C. United canceled the contract before the final match of the 2019 regular season, opting to stream the remaining game on its website for free.

D.C. United returned to NBC Sports Washington for the 2021 and 2022 seasons. Spanish-language coverage was added, airing on TeleXitos affiliate WZDC-DT2 (channel 44.2) with WZDC sports anchor Moises Linares as the commentator.

=== Radio ===
Radio rights have been held by iHeartMedia since the 2022 season. Coverage airs on WMZQ-FM-HD2 and W284CQ (104.7 FM). Spanish television audio is also available on iHeartRadio. Coverage in the first season was a simulcast of television commentary; after Apple TV picked up television rights, Dave Johnson moved to radio to continue as the team's play-by-play voice, with former Washington Stars player and U.S. international Bruce Murray as analyst.

D.C. United's first radio partner was WMET (1160 AM), which picked up coverage in 2003. For the 2009 season, games moved to WTOP (1050 AM), but the station did not renew its deal and the team went the next four seasons without English-language radio. Tony Limarzi was the commentator.

WACA (1540 AM) broadcast commentary in Spanish from the team's founding through the 2009 season. In 2010, Spanish coverage moved to WDCN-LP (87.7 FM) through the end of the 2012 season.

Coverage in both languages returned for the 2014 season, as D.C. United entered into a four-year deal with CBS Radio, including English commentary on WJFK-FM (106.7 FM) or WJFK (1580 AM) and Spanish on WLZL-HD2 (107.9 FM-HD2). The contract with CBS Radio expired after the 2017 season.

== Players ==
=== Roster ===
As of September 15, 2026

Note: Flags indicate national team as defined under FIFA eligibility rules; some limited exceptions apply. Players may hold more than one non-FIFA nationality.

No.	Pos.	Nation	Player
1	GK	USA	Sean Johnson
2	DF	JPN	Kimito Nono
3	DF	USA	Lucas Bartlett (captain)
4	MF	FIN	Matti Peltola
5	DF	SUI	Silvan Hefti
6	DF	JPN	Keisuke Kurokawa
7	FW	BRA	João Peglow
8	FW	USA	Jared Stroud
9	FW	ISR	Tai Baribo (DP)
11	FW	ROU	Louis Munteanu (DP)
12	DF	USA	Conner Antley
13	DF	USA	Sean Nealis
14	FW	USA	Gabriel Segal

No.	Pos.	Nation	Player
15	DF	AUS	Kye Rowles
20	GK	HAI	Grant Leveille
21	MF	ENG	Andre Dozzell
22	FW	ESA	Nathan Ordaz
23	MF	USA	Brandon Servania
24	GK	USA	Jordan Farr
25	MF	USA	Jackson Hopkins
26	GK	USA	Alex Bono
27	DF	CAN	Nikola Markovic
32	FW	USA	Oscar Avilez
40	MF	DOM	Kamil Castillo
48	MF	USA	Gavin Turner
77	MF	JPN	Hosei Kijima

=== Out on loan ===
Note: Flags indicate national team as defined under FIFA eligibility rules; some limited exceptions apply. Players may hold more than one non-FIFA nationality.

No.	Pos.	Nation	Player
16	DF	USA	Garrison Tubbs (on loan to Orange County SC)
18	FW	USA	Richie Aman (on loan to Loudoun United)

No.	Pos.	Nation	Player
19	FW	USA	Hakim Karamoko (on loan to Forward Madison)

=== Academy ===
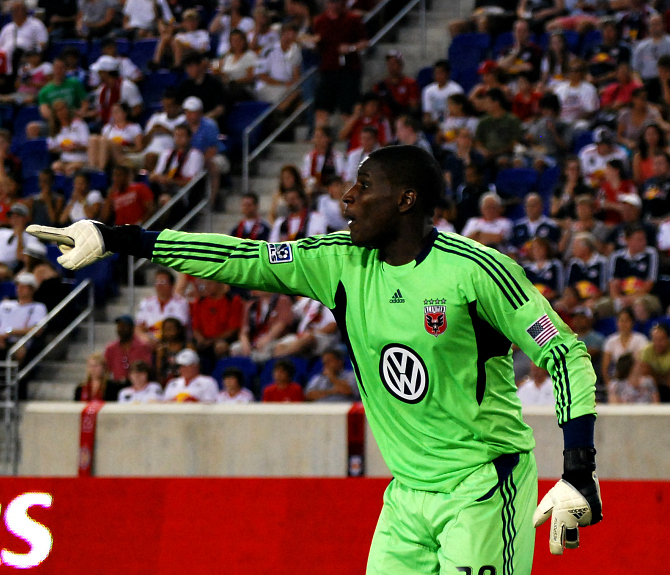
Bill Hamid was D.C.'s first Academy signing.

The D.C. United Academy is the youth and development program for D.C. United. The program consists of the affiliate (formerly reserve) team Loudoun United FC as well as the academy (U-15, U-16 and U-17) and Pre-Academy teams (U-14, U-13). The academy and Pre-Academy teams play in MLS Next.

Notable players to have graduated from the D.C United Academy include Bill Hamid, who has been called up by the U.S. national team, and Andy Najar, who has been capped for Honduras.

== Team management ==
=== Front office ===
Position	Name
Chairman and Majority Owner	(United States) Jason Levien
Co-Chairman	(United States) Stephen Kaplan
Minority Owners	(United States) Mark Ingram II (United States) Mario Mims (United States) Devin Talbott
President, Business Ops	(United States) Danita Johnson
Chief Financial Officer	(United States) Dan Franceschini
Chief Legal Officer	(United States) Jessica Wright

=== Technical staff ===
Position	Name
General Manager	(Germany) Erkut Sogut
Head coach	(Colombia) Óscar Pareja
Assistant Coach	(Switzerland) Thomas Binggeli
Assistant Coach	(Uruguay) Alex Martínez
Goalkeeping Coach	(United States) Cody Mizell
Director of Player Personnel	(Haiti) Clarens Cheridieu
Head Performance Coach	(United States) Matt Challoner

=== Head coaching history ===
Name	Nat	Tenure	Honors
Bruce Arena	USA	1996–1998	1996 U.S. Open Cup; 1996 MLS Cup; 1997 MLS Cup; 1997 Supporters' Shield; 1998 CONCACAF Champions' Cup; 1998 Copa Interamericana
Thomas Rongen	NED	1999–2001	1999 MLS Cup; 1999 Supporters' Shield
Ray Hudson	ENG	2002–2003	None
Piotr Nowak	POL	2004–2006	2004 MLS Cup; 2006 Supporters' Shield
Tom Soehn	USA	2007–2009	2007 Supporters' Shield; 2008 U.S. Open Cup
Curt Onalfo	USA	2010	None
Ben Olsen	USA	2010–2020	2013 U.S. Open Cup
Hernán Losada	ARG	2021–2022	None
Wayne Rooney	ENG	2022–2023	None
Troy Lesesne	USA	2024–2025	None
René Weiler	SUI	2025–2026	None
Óscar Pareja	COL	2027–	

== Honors ==
Domestic
Competitions	Titles	Seasons
MLS Cup	4	1996, 1997, 1999, 2004
Supporters' Shield	4^{s}	1997, 1999, 2006, 2007
U.S. Open Cup	3	1996, 2008, 2013
Eastern Conference (Playoff)	5	1996, 1997, 1998, 1999, 2004
Eastern Conference (Regular Season)	6^{s}	1997, 1998, 1999, 2006, 2007, 2014
Continental
Competitions	Titles	Seasons
CONCACAF Champions Cup	1	1998
Intercontinental
Competitions	Titles	Seasons
Copa Interamericana	1	1998

Notes

- record
- ^{s} shared record

== Record ==
=== Seasons ===
This is a partial list of the last five seasons completed by the D.C. United. For the full season-by-season history, see List of D.C. United seasons.

Season	League											Position		Playoffs	USOC	Continental / Other		Average attendance	Top goalscorer(s)	
Season	Div	League	Pld	W	L	D	GF	GA	GD	Pts	PPG	Conf.	Overall	Playoffs	USOC	Continental / Other		Average attendance	Name(s)	Goals
**2020**	1	MLS	23	5	12	6	25	41	−16	21	0.91	13th	24th	DNQ	NH	Leagues Cup MLS is Back tournament	NH GS	17,056	(Norway) Ola Kamara	3
**2021**	1	MLS	34	14	15	5	56	54	+2	47	1.38	8th	16th	DNQ	NH	DNQ		12,791	(Norway) Ola Kamara	19
**2022**	1	MLS	34	7	21	6	36	71	−35	27	0.87	14th	28th	DNQ	R4	DNQ		16,256	(Greece) Taxiarchis Fountas	12
**2023**	1	MLS	34	10	14	10	45	49	−4	40	1.18	12th	23rd	DNQ	R4	Ro32		17,540	(Belgium) Christian Benteke	14
**2024**	1	MLS	34	10	14	10	52	70	−18	40	1.18	10th	21st	DNQ	DNQ	Ro32		18,137	(Belgium) Christian Benteke	25

1. Avg. attendance include statistics from league matches only.
2. Top goalscorer(s) includes all goals scored in League, MLS Cup Playoffs, U.S. Open Cup, MLS is Back tournament, CONCACAF Champions League, FIFA Club World Cup, and other competitive continental matches.

=== Player records ===
Statistics below show the all-time regular-season club leaders. Bold indicates active D.C. United players.

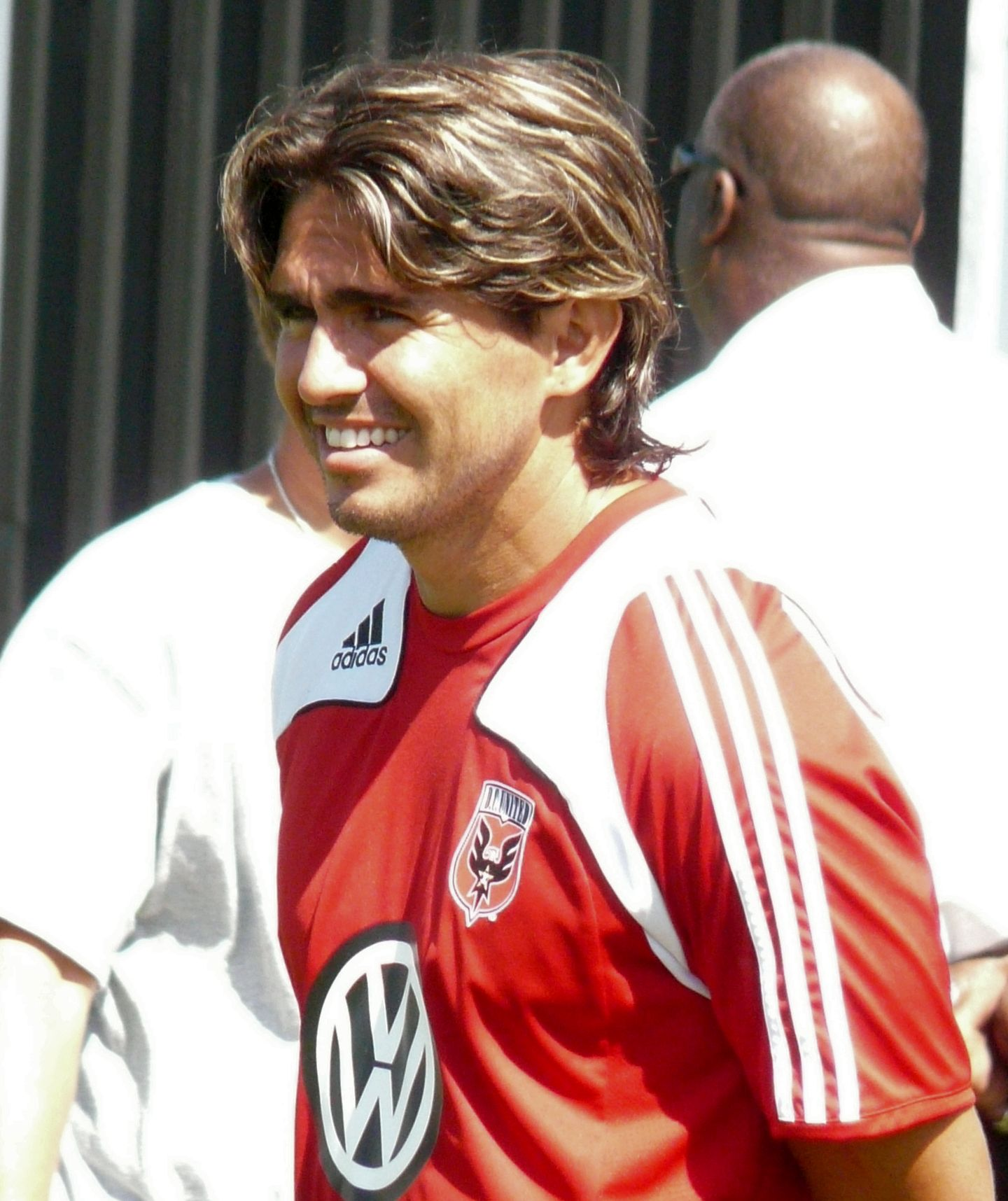
Jaime Moreno holds most of D.C. United's offensive records.

As of July 15, 2025

Category	Record holder	Total
Games	(Bolivia) Jaime Moreno	329
Goals	(Bolivia) Jaime Moreno	131
Assists	(Bolivia) Jaime Moreno	102
Penalty kick goals	(Bolivia) Jaime Moreno	42
Game-winning goals	(Bolivia) Jaime Moreno	26
Hat tricks	(El Salvador) Raúl Díaz Arce (Belgium) Christian Benteke	3
Shutouts	(United States) Bill Hamid	80
Wins	(United States) Bill Hamid	103

=== Team MVP ===
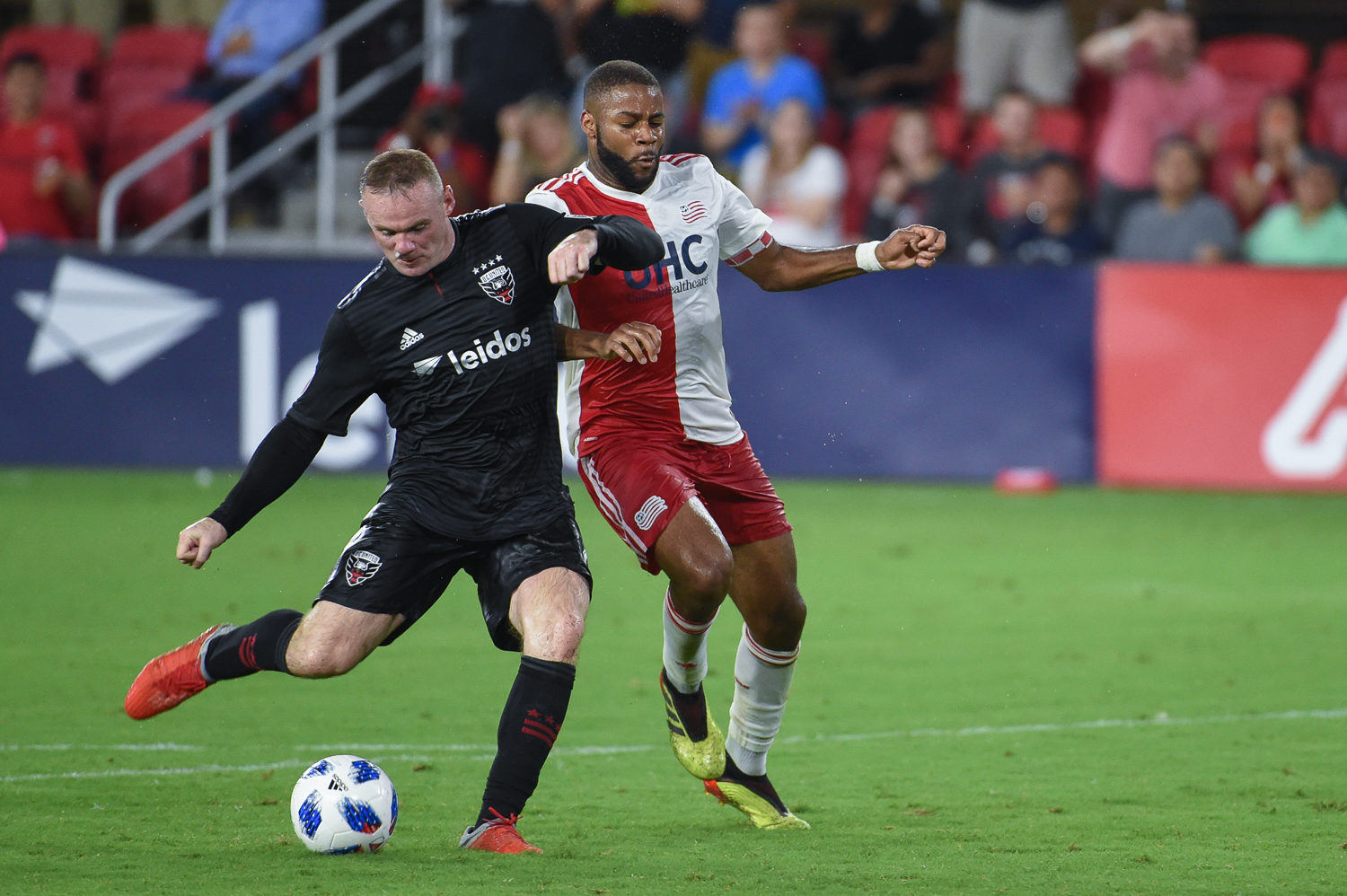
Wayne Rooney played for D.C. United from 2018 to 2020

Dates	Name	Nation
2004	Jaime Moreno	Bolivia
2005	Christian Gómez	Argentina
2006	Christian Gómez (2)	Argentina
2007	Luciano Emilio	Brazil
2008	Jaime Moreno (2)	Bolivia
2009	Clyde Simms	United States
2010	Andy Najar	Honduras
2011	Dwayne De Rosario	Canada
2012	Chris Pontius	United States
2013	Perry Kitchen	United States
2014	Fabián Espíndola	Argentina
2015	Chris Rolfe	United States
2016	Steve Birnbaum	United States
2017	Bill Hamid	United States
2018	Wayne Rooney	England
2019	Luciano Acosta	Argentina
2020	Julian Gressel	Germany
2021	Ola Kamara	Norway
2022	Taxiarchis Fountas	Greece
2023	Mateusz Klich	Poland
2024	Christian Benteke	Belgium

=== MLS All-Time Best XI ===
Four players who were with D.C. United during the 1990s were chosen in 2005 as members of the MLS All-Time Best XI:

- DF: (United States) Jeff Agoos: D.C. United (1996–2000)
- DF: (United States) Eddie Pope: D.C. United (1996–2002)
- MF: (Bolivia) Marco Etcheverry: D.C. United (1996–2003)
- FW: (Bolivia) Jaime Moreno: D.C. United (1996–2002, 2004–10)

=== Hall of Tradition ===
In 2003, D.C. United introduced the "Hall of Tradition" (formerly "Tradition of Excellence"), an honor bestowed upon players, coaches & front office staff deemed by United to have been crucial to the team's success. People are listed in the order in which they joined the club.

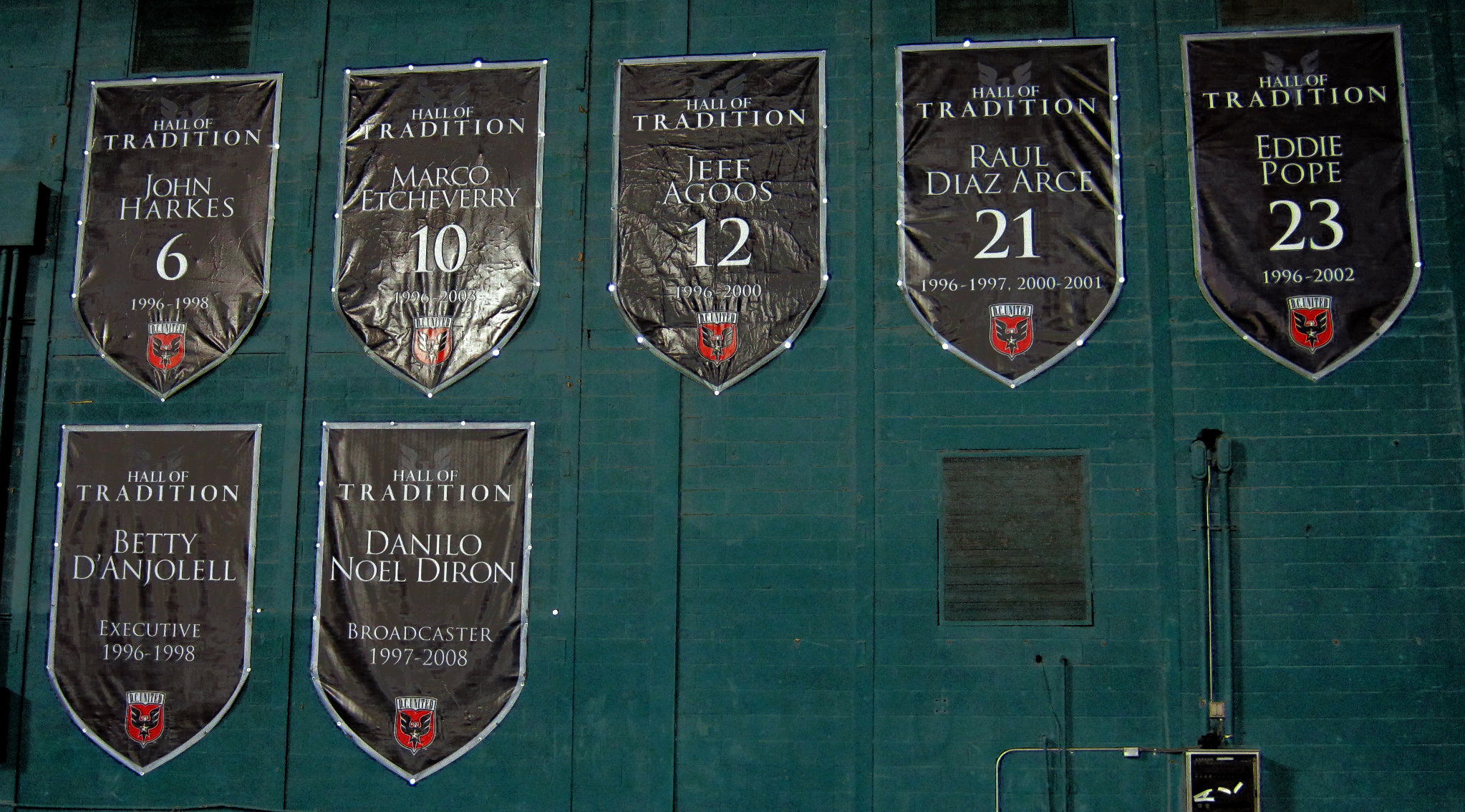
Banners for the "Hall of Tradition" members are displayed at RFK Stadium.

Name	Position/Role	Years	Inducted
(United States) Jeff Agoos	DF	1996–00	October 16, 2008
(El Salvador) Raúl Díaz Arce	FW	1996–97; 2000	September 2, 2009
Betty D'Anjolell	Executive	1995–98	June 29, 2008
Danilo Noel Dirón	Broadcaster	1997–08	September 2, 2009
(Bolivia) Marco Etcheverry	MF	1996–03	October 20, 2007
(United States) John Harkes	MF	1996–98	May 14, 2003
(Bolivia) Jaime Moreno	FW	1996–02; 2004–10	September 14, 2013
(United States) Ben Olsen	MF	1998–09	September 15, 2012
Kevin Payne	President/CEO	1994–01; 2004–12	October 2, 2015
(United States) Eddie Pope	DF	1996–02	July 18, 2010
(United States) Richie Williams	MF	1996–00, 2002	October 15, 2011

== See also ==
- Sports in Washington, D.C.
