= D.C. United Holdings =

American holding company

D.C. United Holdings is the holding company that controls operating rights to D.C. United, a professional soccer club that is part of Major League Soccer (MLS). The company, founded in 2007, was initially led by Will Chang, Brian Davis, Christian Laettner, and Kevin Payne who maintained his position with the new investors. D.C. United Holdings bought D.C. United from Anschutz Entertainment Group for US$33 million, which was a record fee for operational rights to an MLS club at that time.

In May 2009, previous stakeholder Victor MacFarlane announced the sale of his share of D.C. United Holdings to majority owner William Chang, giving him a 98% stake in the organization. In October 2009, Chang bought out Davis and Laettner, who held the remaining 2%, to fully control 100% of the team.

In 2012, Erick Thohir and Jason Levien purchased the club and its holding company, with Chang remaining as a minority investor. Their efforts are primarily focused on getting United a new stadium and enhancing the four-time MLS champions' global profile. Erick Thohir minority stake was bought by rapper Yo Gotti in September 2021.
