= Russell T. Lewis =

American news paper executive

- Born: 1947 (age 78–79); United States
- Education: Stony Brook University, Brooklyn Law School
- Occupations: Business executive, lawyer
- Known for: Former CEO of The New York Times Company

Russell T. Lewis (born c. 1947) is an American business executive and lawyer who was CEO of The New York Times Company from 1997 to December 26, 2004.

Lewis graduated from New Rochelle High School in 1965 and received a B.A. from Stony Brook University in 1969 while working as a copy boy for The Times since 1966. He earned a Juris Doctor degree from Brooklyn Law School in 1973. He was an associate at Cahill Gordon & Reindel until returning to The Times in 1977 as a staff attorney.

At the paper he was senior vice president of circulation from 1984 to 1988, senior vice president of production from 1988 to 1991, executive vice president and deputy general manager from 1991 to 1993, president and general manager from 1993 to 1996, chief operating officer from 1996 to 1997.

After retiring he was a director for R.H. Donnelley and its successor Dex Media.

Business positions
Preceded by Lance Primus	The New York Times Company CEO; 1997–2004	Succeeded by Janet L. Robinson
