= Kopit =

Kopit is a surname. Notable people with the surname include:

- Arthur Kopit (1937–2021), American playwright
- Meredith Levien (née Kopit, born 1970/1971), American media executive
