= Sheryl Gay Stolberg =

American journalist (born 1961)

- Born: November 18, 1961 (age 64)
- Education: University of Virginia
- Occupation: Journalist
- Employer: The New York Times

Sheryl Gay Stolberg (born November 18, 1961) is an American journalist based in Washington, D.C., who covers health policy for The New York Times. She is a former Congressional correspondent and White House correspondent who covered Presidents George W. Bush and Barack Obama, and shared in two Pulitzer Prizes while at the Los Angeles Times. She has appeared as a political analyst on ABC, PBS, Fox, MSNBC and WNYC. She is a regular contributor to the news program 1A, which is syndicated on National Public Radio.

== Early life and education ==
While attending the University of Virginia, Stolberg gained her first experience in journalism at The Cavalier Daily, the school's student newspaper, for which she eventually served as executive editor.

== Career ==
Stolberg began her career at The Providence Journal in Providence, Rhode Island, covering local news and police. She joined the Los Angeles Times in 1987, covering local news, and was soon promoted to the newspaper's Metro desk, where she shared in two Pulitzer Prizes won by that newspaper's staff for spot news reporting: one in 1993 for "balanced, comprehensive, penetrating coverage under deadline pressure of the second, most destructive day of the Los Angeles riots," and one in 1995 for coverage "of the chaos and devastation in the aftermath of the Northridge earthquake" of January 1994. In 1995, she moved to the paper's Washington bureau, as a roving domestic policy reporter.

Stolberg joined The New York Times in 1997 as a Washington correspondent, covering science and health policy. She spent five years writing extensively on bioethics issues, including cloning, the death of a gene therapy patient, embryonic stem cell research and an experimental artificial heart. She switched to writing about U.S. politics in 2002, covering Congress, including the Supreme Court confirmations of Justices John Roberts and Samuel Alito. She covered the White House from 2006 to 2011, chronicling the end of the George W. Bush presidency and the transition to the presidency of Barack Obama. In 2011, Stolberg joined the team covering the 2012 presidential elections, and was a lead author of the Times' "Long Run" series of biographical profiles of Republican presidential candidates, including Newt Gingrich, Jon Huntsman, Rick Santorum, Michele Bachmann, and Mitt Romney. From mid-2015 to mid-2017 she was the newspaper's Mid-Atlantic Bureau Chief, covering politics, news and features of national interest, including the unrest in Baltimore in the aftermath of the death of Freddie Gray, and the trials of the six police officers charged in his death. She wrote extensively about the key swing states of Ohio and Pennsylvania during the 2016 presidential election. In 2017, Stolberg returned to Capitol Hill to chronicle Congress during the presidency of Donald Trump, but was reassigned to write about the intersection of health, policy and politics during the COVID-19 pandemic. Throughout her two-decade career in Washington, she has profiled dozens of major political and cultural figures, including Supreme Court Justices Sonia Sotomayor, Elena Kagan and Anthony M. Kennedy, House Speaker Nancy Pelosi, Valerie Plame, the former spy, and Katharine Weymouth, then publisher of The Washington Post.

== Awards ==
- 2009 Gerald Loeb Award for Large Newspapers for "The Reckoning," an article examining President George W. Bush's role in the mortgage meltdown of 2008
- Pulitzer Prize for Spot News Reporting (shared with the staff of the Los Angeles Times) for coverage of the 1994 Northridge earthquake
- Pulitzer Prize for Spot News Reporting (shared with the staff of the Los Angeles Times) for coverage of the 1992 Los Angeles riots

== Personal life ==
Stolberg is married to the photographer and videographer Scott Robinson, who is the author of the coffee table book Faces of NASCAR. They live outside Washington, D.C., and have two children.
