= Brian Davis (basketball) =

American basketball player and businessman (born 1970)

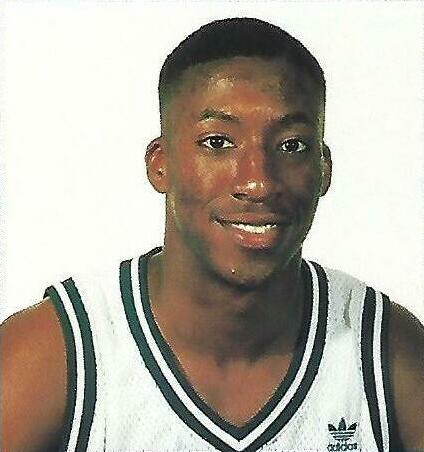
- Davis with Duke in 1988

Personal information
- Born: June 21, 1970 (age 56) Atlantic City, New Jersey, U.S.
- Listed height: 6 ft 7 in (2.01 m)
- Listed weight: 200 lb (91 kg)

Career information
- High school: Bladensburg (Bladensburg, Maryland)
- College: Duke (1988–1992)
- NBA draft: 1992: 2nd round, 48th overall pick
- Drafted by: Phoenix Suns
- Playing career: 1992–2000
- Position: Small forward / shooting guard
- Number: 23

Career history
- 1992–1993: Pau-Orthez
- 1993–1994: Minnesota Timberwolves
- 1994–1995: Pittsburgh Piranhas
- 2000: Aliağa Petkim

Career highlights
- 2× NCAA champion (1991, 1992)
- Stats at NBA.com
- Stats at Basketball Reference
Medals
Men's basketball
Representing United States
Pan American Games
Silver medal – second place	1995 Mar del Plata	Team competition

Brian Keith Davis (born June 21, 1970) is an American former basketball player and businessman. A 6'7" guard-forward, Davis played college basketball for the Duke Blue Devils and was a member of the 1991 and 1992 national championship teams.

After graduation, Davis was drafted by the Phoenix Suns of the National Basketball Association (NBA) but played in the Ligue Nationale de Basketball with Élan Béarnais Pau-Orthez during the 1992–93 season. He made his NBA debut with the Minnesota Timberwolves for the 1993–94 season. Davis played in 68 NBA games, averaged 5.5 minutes per game, and scored a total of 131 career points (1.9 per game).

He maintains a close friendship with former Duke and Timberwolves teammate Christian Laettner, with the two pursuing multiple sports ventures together. Such ventures have included real estate development and founding D.C. United Holdings in 2007 as a holding company for D.C. United of Major League Soccer.
