= Erkut Sogut =

German sports agent

Erkut Sogut (born 17 September 1980) is a Turkish-German sports agent and lawyer, most notable for being the agent of football star Mesut Özil. He is currently the sporting director of Major League Soccer club D.C. United.

== Early life ==
Born in Hanover, Germany, to Turkish migrant parents, Erkut graduated from high school in Hanover in 2000. He started studying law at the University of Osnabrück in 2001. After graduating, he worked in the German-Indian Chamber of Commerce in New Delhi with a focus on arbitration; he also worked in the Istanbul office of the German law firm Luther.

Following his two-year legal training at the Düsseldorf Higher Regional Court, he passed his second state judicial exam and gained the right to practice as a lawyer.

== Career ==
Sogut was the agent for German international footballer Mesut Özil, and negotiated Özil's transfer from Real Madrid to Arsenal in 2013, which at the time was for a club record transfer fee.

On 19 September 2025, Major League Soccer club D.C. United announced that Sogut had been appointed as the club's "Managing Director of Soccer Operations", a role which would entail being majorly involved in player acquisition for the team. Sogut had previously played a key role in the identification and appointment of D.C. head coach René Weiler.
