= The Cavalier Daily =

Student newspaper at the University of Virginia

- October 7, 2005 front page
- Type: Student newspaper
- Format: Tabloid
- Owner(s): The Cavalier Daily, Inc.
- Editor-in-chief: Leigh Bailey
- Founded: January 15, 1890
- Headquarters: Charlottesville, Virginia
- Circulation: 7,500
- Website: cavalierdaily.com

The Cavalier Daily is an independent, student-run daily news organization at the University of Virginia. Founded in 1890, under the name College Topics, The Cavalier Daily is Virginia's oldest collegiate daily and the oldest daily newspaper in Charlottesville, Virginia.

Since the summer of 1996, The Cavalier Daily has been the only daily newspaper at the university, with a print circulation of 7,500 distributed on Grounds and in the surrounding Charlottesville area. The Cavalier Daily also publishes content online and on social media daily with expanded and enhanced content.

== History ==
=== Founding and name ===
The Cavalier Daily printed its first issue under the name College Topics on January 15, 1890. In 1924, the newspaper increased its publication schedule from twice a week to six times a week, making the paper a daily. However, the following year, the paper's off-campus printer suffered a catastrophic fire, and the newspaper alternated between two and three publication days a week until 1940.

During World War II College Topics struggled for survival as the University of Virginia student population was greatly reduced due to the war effort. By 1943, the paper had become a four-page weekly that featured only bulletins. After the war, the paper increased its circulation and content, and was renamed The Cavalier Daily on May 4, 1948.

The first woman member of the Managing Board, Mary Love, was elected business manager in 1973, and the first woman editor-in-chief, Marjorie Leedy, followed in 1976. During this time, Managing Board races became highly competitive, and the paper adopted more professional journalistic standards. In 1973, a staff split resulted in several unsuccessful candidates for the Managing Board leaving to form The Declaration, a weekly tabloid-format publication that continues to publish.

=== Competition ===
In 1979, the university saw the creation of another student-run newspaper, the University Journal, which originally formed in opposition to what many saw as the left-wing editorial stances of The Cavalier Daily. An intense rivalry between the two newspapers for news and advertising grew as the University Journal published three times weekly in the 1980s and then four times weekly beginning in 1991. Amid significant debt, the University Journal cut back production starting in 1996 and ceased to exist by 1998. Since that time, The Cavalier Daily has been one of two physical newspapers at the University of Virginia, alongside The Declaration, a bi-weekly tabloid-format newsmagazine.

=== Web edition ===
In 1995, The Cavalier Daily Online Edition was launched, and in 1998, The Cavalier Daily began to pay rent for its offices in Newcomb Hall, the last step in the path toward complete independence from the university that began in earlier decades. The Digitization Project, completed in 2001, made all aspects of production computer-based. In May 2020, The Cavalier Daily launched a redesigned website.

=== Cartoon controversy ===
In 2006 and 2007, The Cavalier Daily comics section came under fire for controversial cartoons. In August 2006, the comics were considered insensitive to Christians, involving the Virgin Mary and Jesus. The controversy received national attention and was featured on Bill O'Reilly's The O'Reilly Factor. In September 2007, the same cartoonist caused outcry with a comic entitled "Ethiopian Food Fight", which portrayed malnourished ethnic Ethiopians fighting each other with various objects including boots, twigs, pillows and chairs. The ambiguity of the term "food fight" carried over to the cartoon itself, creating controversy over whether it a) caricatured victims of the Ethiopian famine as being forced to eat non-food items, which they then would throw at each other in a "food fight" in the usual sense, or instead b) depicted Ethiopians so impoverished that they could afford neither food nor weapons, such that they were forced to improvise weapons to use in their fight over scarce food resources, a type of dispute to which news sources including CNN and the Washington Post have applied the term "food fight". Some readers from each respective side joined in claiming that the artist's characterization of the disputants dehumanized Ethiopians, as did some readers who were not sure which meaning was intended but found either alternative objectionable. The controversy led the managing board of the paper to fire the artist despite a lack of clear justification concerning editorial oversight and ultimate responsibility for publication of the controversial comic; the artist was also the senior graphics editor at the time, a position subordinate to all members of the managing board. Four other comic artists, including another graphics editor, voluntarily resigned from the paper, prompting an unprecedented mid-year replacement of comics staff. A complete comics strike was staged during a week of attempted negotiations, but the managing board covered up the strike by rerunning strips. The episode earned the 2007 managing board of the paper a Jefferson Muzzle award from the Thomas Jefferson Center for the Protection of Free Expression.

In 2008, two strips of the comic TCB were withdrawn following outcry from campus and alumni Christians as well as Catholic League president Bill Donohue. Donohue mistakenly suggested a double standard on the part of The Cavalier Daily, as evidenced by the comic strip Luftwaffle's cartoon featuring a censored Muhammad. He took this as an acknowledgment "that any and all depictions of the Muslim prophet Muhammed are banned."

=== Rolling Stone False Rape Story ===
The Cavalier Daily was criticized for its "one-sided coverage" and lack of skepticism regarding Jackie Coakley's false rape claims in 2014 as published in the defamatory Rolling Stone "A Rape on Campus" story. In particular, accusations of ignoring the facts of the case were leveled at assistant editor Julia Horowitz, who claimed after the article had been retracted that " to let fact checking define the narrative would be a huge mistake."

== Operations and Governance ==
The Cavalier Daily, until January 2012, went to press five issues per week in the fall and spring semesters. Starting in January 2012, the newspaper cut its Friday edition. Starting in August 2013, The Cavalier Daily replaced its daily newspaper with a revamped biweekly newsmagazine and expanded online and mobile content offerings. New digital offerings included mobile and tablet apps, a daily e-newsletter, high-quality multimedia content and an increased emphasis on social media and web graphics. In 2017, The Cavalier Daily launched abCD magazine as a way to share longer-form stories through words and creative visuals. In 2019, The Cavalier Daily created On Record, a weekly podcast available on Spotify and Apple Podcasts. In 2020, as the COVID-19 pandemic forced students off Grounds for the first time in University history, The Cavalier Daily launched a redesigned website with easier access to articles and video content. The new website helped transition The Cavalier Daily into a digital-first news organization, with print editions coming out once every other week instead of weekly.

Print distribution is 7,500 copies across the University Grounds and Charlottesville. Starting in August 2015, The Cavalier Daily began printing at Narrow Passage Press in Edinburg, Virginia. Previously, the newspaper was printed at the press of the Culpeper Star-Exponent in Culpeper, Virginia.

In an average year, the newspaper's staff exceeds 400 students, who are all volunteers. The paper's editors include five members of the Managing Board, several copy editors, online managers and editors, and over two dozen section editors, all elected by the staff each January.

The student journalists are solely responsible for all content under the direction of the student editor-in-chief.

== Accolades and awards ==
The Cavalier Daily has been recognized as one of the best college newspapers in the country. In 2020, it was named the third best public college newspaper by The Princeton Review. By 2024, it had dropped to 25th on the same rankings list.

== Notable alumni ==
=== Media/journalism ===
- Nancy Andrews (Managing Editor, 1985): photojournalist and author, 1999 White House Photographer of the Year
- Nancy Barnes (Editor-in-Chief, 1981): senior vice president for news and editorial director, National Public Radio; former executive editor, The Houston Chronicle
- Kate Bedingfield (Sports Writer, 2000–02): former White House Communications Director in the Biden administration
- Jamelle Bouie (Arts Writer, 2006): opinion columnist, The New York Times
- Katie Couric (Associate News Editor, 1975–1978): broadcast journalist and managing editor; correspondent for 60 Minutes and reporter for ABC, CBS, and NBC; first solo female anchor of a major network evening news program.
- Robert Cullen: former international correspondent for Newsweek and author
- Lane DeGregory (Editor-in-Chief, 1988–89): features writer for St. Petersburg Times, Pulitzer Prize winner
- Meredith Kopit Levien (Associate Opinion Editor, 1991–93): chief executive officer, The New York Times
- George P. Rodrigue III (Editor-in-Chief, 1977–78): former editor-in-chief of The Plain Dealer, two-time Pulitzer Prize winner
- Sheryl Gay Stolberg (Executive Editor, 1982–83): health policy correspondent, The New York Times
- Ben Tobin (Managing Editor, 2018–19): journalist for American City Business Journals, Pulitzer Prize winner
- Jia Tolentino (Opinion Columnist, 2007): staff writer, The New Yorker; author
- Michael Vitez (Editor-in-Chief, 1978–79): journalist with The Philadelphia Inquirer, Pulitzer Prize winner

=== Other areas ===
- Alfred Berkeley, III, former president, NASDAQ stock exchange
- Robert W. Daniel Jr., former U.S. congressman from Virginia, 1973–1983
- William Stamps Farish III, former U.S. ambassador to the UK, 2001–2004
- John T. Casteen III, president, University of Virginia, 1990–2010
