= Janet L. Robinson =

Former President and CEO of The New York Times (born 1950)

Janet Robinson
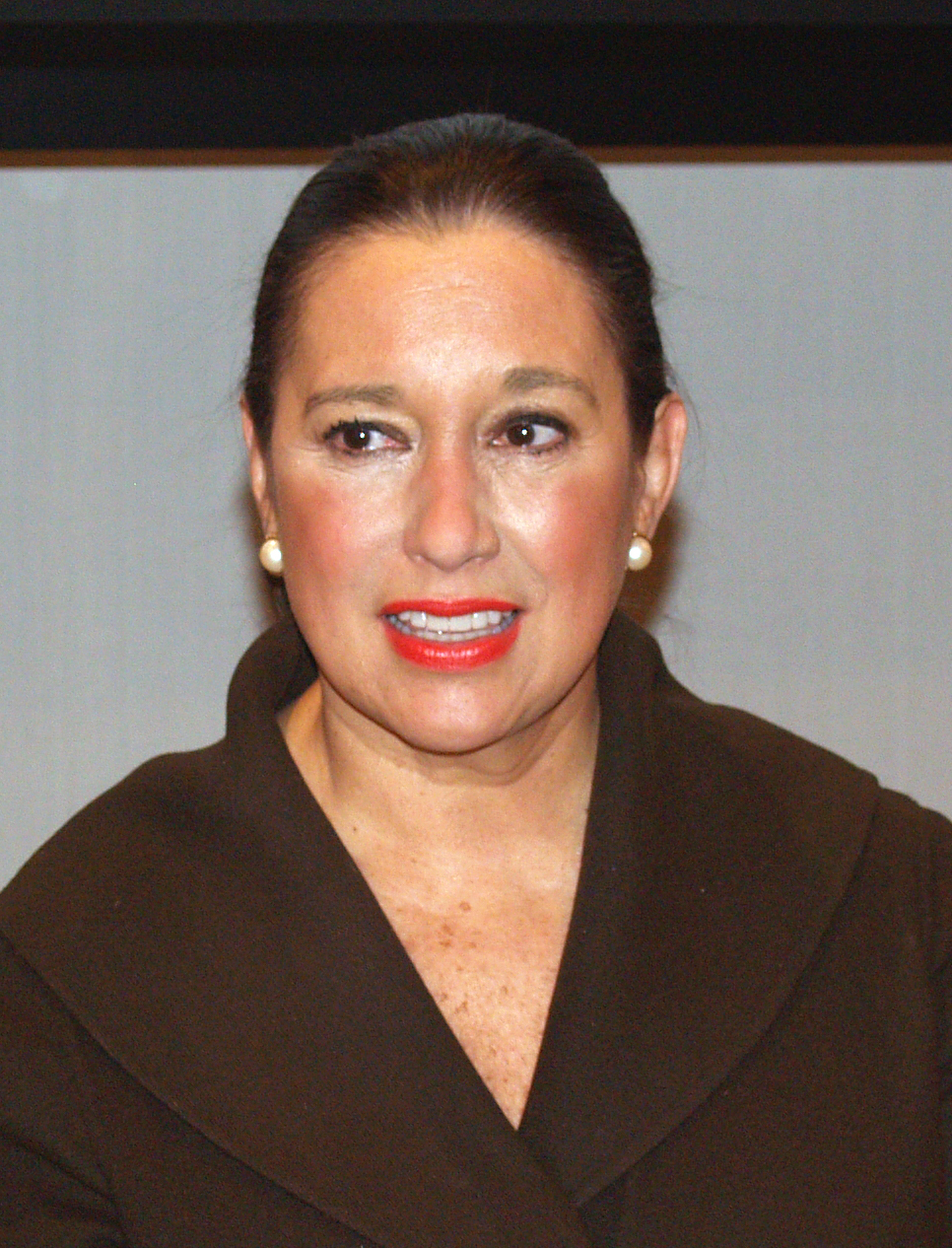
- Born: June 11, 1950 (age 76); Fall River, Massachusetts, U.S.
- Education: Salve Regina University (BA)
- Occupation: Business executive
- Known for: former chief executive officer of the New York Times Company

Janet L. Robinson (born June 11, 1950) is an American executive who was the president and chief executive officer of the New York Times Company on December 27, 2004, until she retired on December 31, 2011.

== Early life and education ==
Janet L. Robinson was born on June 11, 1950, in Fall River, Massachusetts. Her mother was Louise Cottell Robinson, a beauty salon owner, and her father was Isaac Frederick Robinson Jr. Robinson received a Bachelor of Arts in English from Salve Regina University, where she graduated cum laude in 1972.

== The New York Times ==
She joined the New York Times Company in June 1983 as an account executive at Tennis magazine. Robinson was national resort and travel manager of Golf Digest/Tennis in May 1985 and the advertising director of Tennis magazine from September 1987 until August 1990.

Robinson was the group senior vice president for the advertising sales and marketing unit of the company's Women's Magazine Group (which has since been sold) since January 1992, vice president and director of advertising from May until December 1994, senior vice president of the group from January 1995 until 1996, and she was senior vice president of advertising. Robinson was responsible for overall advertising sales at the newspaper.

From February 2001 until January 2004, she was the senior vice president and held the position of president and general manager of The New York Times newspaper from 1996 until 2004.

On December 27, 2004, Robinson was named president and chief executive officer of the New York Times Company and elected as a director of the company.

Robinson unexpectedly announced her year-end retirement from the New York Times Company on December 15, 2011, after twenty-eight years with the company. Her severance package valued at about $23 million was disclosed on March 9, 2012, in the company's regulatory filing. The reasons behind her retirement were undisclosed and fostered questions by business analysts and observers suggesting her departure resulted from personal conflicts with the New York Times Company publisher Arthur Ochs Sulzberger Jr.

After her departure, Sulzberger Jr. filled in as chief executive officer of the New York Times Company until the search for a permanent successor was completed with the choice of Mark Thompson.

== Other interests ==
She was the chair of the Carnegie Corporation of New York, a member of the international advisory board of Fleishman Hillard, chairman of the presidential board of trustees of Salve Regina University and a member of the leadership committee for the Lincoln Center Consolidated Corporate Fund. She is the chair of the Ad Council Campaign Selection Committee, a trustee for the University of Rhode Island Oceanography Graduate School and a trustee of the Preservation Society of Newport County.

She was on the board of New England Sports Ventures, and was vice chairman of the board of the Liberty Science Center in Jersey City, New Jersey. In 2008 she joined the advisory board for New York Women in Communications, Inc. (NYWICI). She was the chairman of the Advertising Council from 2004 until 2005, and was chairman of the board of directors of the American Advertising Federation from 1999 until 2000. From 2001 to 2009 was on the board of the Newspaper Association of America.

Business positions
Preceded by Russell T. Lewis	The New York Times Company CEO; 2004–2011	Succeeded by Mark Thompson
