= Guidehouse =

American management consulting firm

Guidehouse, Inc.
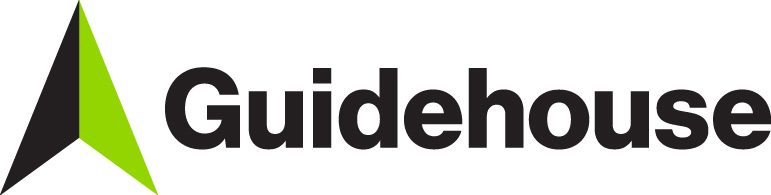
- Type: Private
- Traded as: NYSE: NCI; Nasdaq: METZ
- Industry: Professional services
- Headquarters: Tysons, Virginia (Global)
- Area served: Worldwide
- Key people: Scott McIntyre (CEO)
- Revenue: $3 billion
- Owner: Bain Capital; (2023–present)
- Number of employees: 18,000 (2025)
- Website: guidehouse.com

Guidehouse, Inc. is a global professional services firm delivering advisory, technology, and managed services to the commercial and government sectors. It is the successor to PwC’s public sector business and it was acquired in 2018 by Veritas. The head office is in Tysons, Virginia.

In December 2023, Guidehouse was acquired by Bain Capital.

== History ==
Guidehouse began as PwC's U.S. public sector business. New York private equity firm Veritas Capital acquired the company in 2018. It retained leadership, including Chief Executive Officer Scott McIntyre. Deborah Ricci was appointed as its CFO.

After the acquisition, it then operated as the independent company "Guidehouse". Bloomberg reported that Guidehouse had an estimated valuation of approximately $7 billion in 2023.

The company acquired and combined with Navigant Consulting Inc in August 2019 for $1.1 billion. A year after purchasing Dovel Technologies, it acquired Grant Thornton LLP’s public sector advisory practice in 2022.

In November 2023, Bain Capital agreed to acquire Guidehouse for $5 billion. The purchase was completed the following month.

=== Navigant Consulting ===
Navigant Consulting was founded in 1983 by Richard Metzler as The Metzler Group Inc., providing management consulting to energy and other regulated industries. It was listed on NASDAQ in October 1996 under the ticker symbol METZ. In July 1999, the company was renamed Navigant Consulting, Inc., and its stock was subsequently listed on the New York Stock Exchange. William M. Goodyear became chairman and CEO in 2000.

In 2005, the company faced allegations of overcharging Los Angeles County for work at Martin Luther King Jr.-Harbor Hospital. County auditors rejected more than $206,000 in expenses, citing unauthorized first-class flights and uncompleted project goals. The hospital later failed to meet federal Medicare standards in 2006, prompting a major restructuring plan.

Julie Howard succeeded Goodyear as CEO in 2012. In April 2018, Navigant partnered with Baptist Health South Florida to form a joint venture for healthcare revenue cycle management. In August 2018, the company sold its disputes and investigations division to Ankura Consulting.

=== Teen Pregnancy Prevention Program Controversy ===
In October 2026, NPR reported that Guidehouse had been awarded $86 million out of a $100 million program to administer the Teen Pregnancy Prevention Program (TPP). TPP funds had historically been awarded 50 separate programs that teach teens how to prevent pregnancy and sexually transmitted infections through a public competitive process. To be legally eligible, programs must be evidence-based and proven to work, and the local public health departments and other awardee organizations would then adopt them to their local communities. That June, the Trump administration had canceled all existing TPP grants and released a new request for proposals (RFP) for programs that emphasized sexual abstinence. However, implementation of the RFP was blocked by a federal judge on the basis that it violated the Administrative Procedure Act by imposing conditions on grantees that were not intended by Congress or that were unreasonable or unexplained.

On the last day of the fiscal year, Health and Human Services awarded $86 million to Guidehouse, which does not mention teen pregnancy on its website and exhibits no clear sign of experience in the area. And the award did not come from the subdivision of HHS that normally awards TPP grants, but from the Administration for Children and Families (ACF), whose leadership includes Cody Inman, who came to work for the Trump administration from Guidehouse along with at least two other HHS officials.

Navigant Consulting Acquisitions
Date	Company	Business	Price if known
Aug 1997	Resource Management International Inc.	engineering	$82,000,000
Aug 1997	Reed Consulting Group	energy-related consulting	-
Sep 1998	Peterson Consulting	information services	$160,000,000
Sep 2002	The Hunter Group	health care consulting	$25,400,000
Feb 2004	Tucker Alan	business and litigation consulting	$90,000,000
Mar 2006	Precept Programme Management Limited	dispute advisory and program management consulting	$50,000,000
Aug 2007	HJA Consulting	hydroelectric performance	-
Jan 2009	The Bard Group	healthcare consulting	-
Jan 2010	Summit Blue Consulting	utilities consulting	-
May 2010	Daylight Forensic & Advisory	financial consulting	$40,000,000
Oct 2010	Ethos Partners	healthcare management consulting	$37,000,000
Jul 2012	Pike Research	energy technology	-
Oct 2012	Easton Associates	life sciences consulting	-
May 2014	Cymetrix Corp.	healthcare revenue management	$100,000,000
Feb 2015	RevenueMed	healthcare revenue management	-
Jan 2016	McKinnis Consulting Services	healthcare revenue management	$52,000,000
Jan 2016	Dymedex Consulting	life sciences	-
Nov 2016	Ecofys	energy and sustainability	-
Nov 2017	Quorum Consulting	life sciences	-

== Operations ==
After it was sold by PwC, Guidehouse leadership was announced, including Chief Executive Officer Scott McIntyre and Chief Financial Officer Deborah Ricci. Guidehouse services state, local, and federal clients, including the U.S. Departments of Defense, Homeland Security, Veterans Affairs, Health and Human Services and State as of 2018.

Guidehouse was considered among the Washington, D.C., region’s largest private companies and in 2018, it was reported that the company had 16,000 employees in 53 locations around the world and $3 billion in annual revenue.

In 2021, Guidehouse moved its global headquarters to Tysons, Virginia, due to an increase in demands for the company's services. It has three offices local to Washington, D.C.
