= The New York Times Company =

American mass media corporation

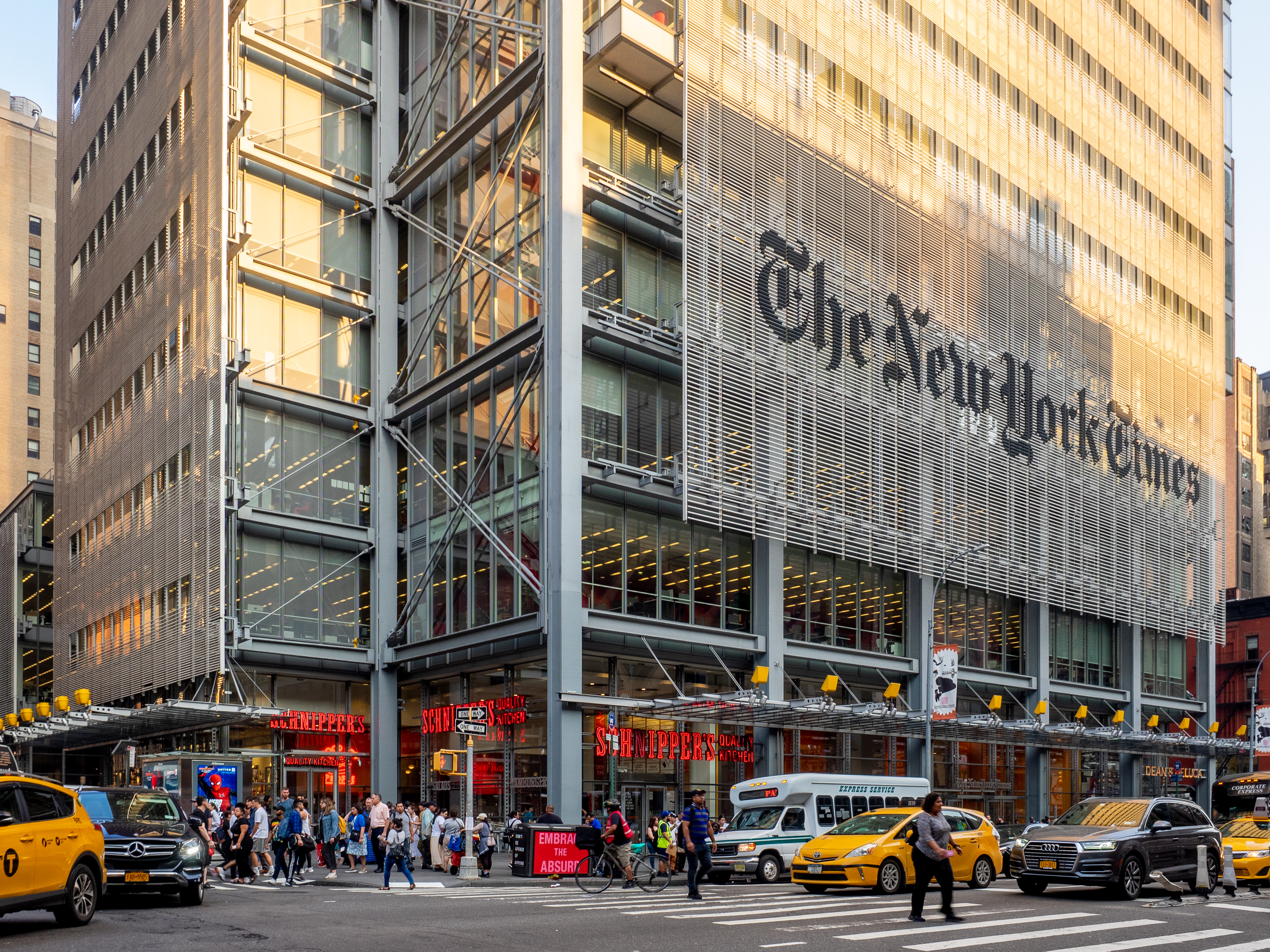
- The New York Times Building, headquarters of the company
- Type: Public
- Traded as: NYSE: NYT (Class A); S&P 400 component
- Industry: Newspapers
- Founded: September 18, 1851; 175 years ago
- Founders: Henry Jarvis Raymond; George Jones
- Headquarters: The New York Times Building, New York City, United States
- Area served: Worldwide
- Key people: A. G. Sulzberger (chairman); Meredith Kopit Levien (president and CEO)
- Products: The New York Times; The New York Times International Edition; Other media properties
- Revenue: ▲US$2.82 billion (2025)
- Operating income: ▲US$432 million (2025)
- Net income: ▲US$344 million (2025)
- Total assets: ▲US$3.00 billion (2025)
- Total equity: ▲US$2.04 billion (2025)
- Number of employees: c. 6,000 (2025)
- Website: nytco.com

The New York Times Company is an American mass media corporation that publishes The New York Times and its associated publications such as The New York Times International Edition and other media properties. The New York Times Company's headquarters are in the New York Times Building, a building in Manhattan, New York City.

== History ==
The company was founded by Henry Jarvis Raymond and George Jones in New York City. The first edition of the newspaper The New York Times, published on September 18, 1851, stated: "We publish today the first issue of the New-York Daily Times, and we intend to issue it every morning (Sundays excepted) for an indefinite number of years to come."

The company moved into the cable channel industry, purchasing a 40% interest in the Popcorn Channel, a theatrical movie preview and local movie times, in November 1994. In 1996, it expanded upon its broadcasting by purchasing Palmer Communications, owners of WHO-DT in Des Moines and KFOR in Oklahoma City.

In April 2002, the New York Times Company and Discovery Communications announced a joint venture television network called Discovery Times, although this was just a rename of the Discovery Civilization Network. The company completed its purchase of The Washington Post's 50 percent interest in the International Herald Tribune (IHT) for US$65 million on January 1, 2003, becoming the sole owner.

On March 18, 2005, the company acquired About.com, an online provider of consumer information, for US$410 million. In 2005, the company reported revenues of US$3.4 billion to its investors. The Times, on August 25, 2006, acquired Baseline StudioSystems, an online database and research service on the film and television industries for US$35 million.

In 2006, The Times sold their stake in Discovery Times to Discovery. The channel was relaunched as Investigation Discovery two years later. The company announced on September 12, 2006, its decision to sell its Broadcast Media Group, consisting of "nine network-affiliated television stations, their related Web sites and the digital operating center". The New York Times reported on January 4, 2007, that the company had reached an agreement to sell all nine local television stations to the private equity firm Oak Hill Capital Partners, which then created a holding company for the stations, Local TV LLC. The company announced that it had finalized the sale of its Broadcast Media Group on May 7, 2007, for "approximately $575 million".

On May 7, 2007, the company announced that its About.com web information service was acquiring Consumersearch.com, a Web site that compiles reviews of consumer products, for $33 million in cash.

In 2007, the company moved from 229 West 43rd Street to the New York Times Building at 620 Eighth Avenue, on the west side of Times Square, between 40th and 41st streets across from the Port Authority of New York & New Jersey Bus Terminal. In March 2009, the Times sold its ownership of the nineteen stories that it occupied in the New York Times Building to W. P. Carey for $225 million. In exchange, the Times leased back its floors for $24 million per year for 10 years. At the end of the contract, The Times repurchased the building's leasehold from W. P. Carey in late 2019 for $245 million.

On July 14, 2009, the company announced that WQXR was to be sold to WNYC, which moved the station to 105.9 FM and began to operate the station noncommercially on October 8, 2009. This US$45 million transaction, which involved Univision Radio's WCAA moving to the 96.3 FM frequency from 105.9 FM, ended the Times' 65-year-long ownership of the station.

In December 2011, the company sold its Regional Media Group to Halifax Media Group, owners of The Daytona Beach News-Journal, for $143 million. The Boston Globe and The Telegram & Gazette of Worcester were not part of the sale. In 2011, the Times sold Baseline StudioSystems back to its original owners, Laurie S. Silvers and Mitchell Rubenstein, majority shareholders of Project Hollywood LLC.

Facing falling revenue from print advertising in its flagship publication in 2011, The New York Times, the company introduced a paywall to its website. As of 2012, it had been modestly successful, garnering several hundred thousand subscriptions and about $100 million in annual revenue.

In September 2012, the company sold About.com to IAC Inc. for $300 million. In 2013, the New York Times Company sold The Boston Globe and other New England media properties to John W. Henry, the principal owner of the Boston Red Sox. According to the Times Company, the move was made in order to focus more on its core brands.

After forming an editorial partnership with The New York Times in 2015, The Wirecutter, a product review website, was acquired by the Times in October 2016 for a reported $30 million. In March 2020, the New York Times Company acquired subscription-based audio app, Audm. In July 2020, the New York Times Company acquired podcast production company Serial Productions. The same month, the company appointed chief operating officer Meredith Kopit Levien to the position of CEO.

In January 2022, The New York Times acquired Wordle, an Internet word puzzle game that grew from 90 players in October 2021 to millions at the time of purchase. The Times paid a price "in the low seven figures," according to its creator, Josh Wardle. In February 2022, the New York Times Company bought The Athletic, a subscription-based sports news website, for $550 million. Its founders, Alex Mather and Adam Hansmann, stayed with the publication, which is run separately from the Times.

ValueAct Capital took a stake in the company in August 2022. ValueAct aims to encourage the company to more actively pursue the sale of "bundled" subscriptions to its various offerings. In February 2026, Berkshire Hathaway disclosed that it added about 5.07 million shares of New York Times stock to its portfolio, worth about $351 million as of the end of 2025.

=== Radio stations ===
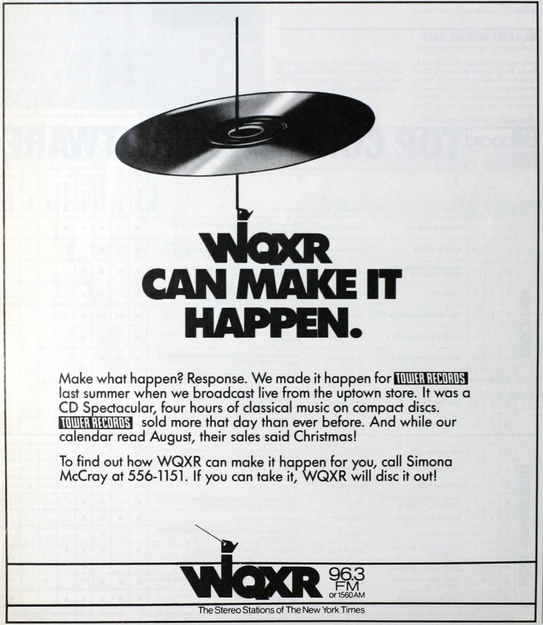
An advertisement of WQXR-FM-AM, formerly known as "The Stereo Stations of The New York Times" (1986)

The paper bought AM radio station WQXR (1560 kHz) in 1944. Its "sister" FM station, WQXQ, became WQXR-FM (96.3 MHz). Branded as "The Stereo Stations of The New York Times", its classical music radio format was simulcast on both the AM and FM frequencies until December 1992, when the big-band and pop standards music format of station WNEW (1130 kHz – now WBBR/"Bloomberg Radio") was transferred to and adopted by WQXR; in recognition of the format change, WQXR changed its call letters to WQEW (a "hybrid" combination of "WQXR" and "WNEW"). By 1999, The New York Times was leasing WQEW to ABC Radio for its "Radio Disney" format. In 2007, WQEW was finally purchased by Disney; in late 2014, it was sold to Family Radio (a religious radio network) and became WFME. In 2009, WQXR-FM was sold to the WNYC radio group and, on October 8, moved from 96.3 to 105.9 MHz (swapping frequencies with Spanish-language station WXNY-FM, which wanted the more powerful transmitter to increase its coverage) and began operating it as a noncommercial, public radio station.

== Holdings ==
Alongside its namesake newspaper, the company owns The New York Times International Edition and related digital properties including NYTimes.com, as well as various brand-related properties.

== Business trends ==
The company experienced a sharp decline in sales at the beginning of the 21st century. From 2011 onwards, sales stabilized and even began to grow again after a few years. In March 2026, the company had a market capitalization of US$13.3 billion.

Year	Revenue in million USD	Net income in million USD	Employees	Subscribers (millions) (Note: Starting in 2021, The New York Times transitioned from reporting subscriptions to subscribers: "Since many people purchase subscriptions to multiple New York Times products, this new goal shifts the emphasis from counting total subscriptions to focusing on the growth and value of individual subscribers." 2021 Annual Report, p. 30)	Subscriptions (millions)
2000	3,489	398	14,000		
2005	3,231	253	11,965		
2006	3,290	-543	11,585		
2007	3,185	209	10,231		
2008	2,940	-58	9,346		
2009	2,440	20	7,665		
2010	1,981	108	7,414		
2011	1,555	-38	7,273		
2012	1,595	136	5,363		
2013	1,577	65	3,529		
2014	1,589	33	3,588		
2015	1,579	63	3,560		2
2016	1,555	29	3,710		2.9
2017	1,676	4	3,790		3.6
2018	1,749	126	4,320		4.3
2019	1,812	140	4,500		5.3
2020	1,784	100	4,700		7.5
2021	2,074	220	5,000	7.6	8.8
2022	2,308	174	5,800	9.6	11
2023	2,426	232	5,900	10.4	
2024	2,586	294	5,900	11.4	
2025	2,825	344	6,000	12.8	

== Ownership and leadership ==
Since September 25, 1997, the company has been listed on the New York Stock Exchange under the symbol NYT. From April 27, 1967, until January 13, 1969, the company's Class A common stock traded over the counter. From January 14, 1969, until September 24, 1997, the shares were traded on the American Stock Exchange. Of the two categories of stock, Class A and Class B, the former is publicly traded and the latter is held privately—largely (over 90% through The 1997 Trust) by the descendants of Adolph Ochs, who purchased The New York Times newspaper in 1896.

=== Carlos Slim loan and investment ===
On January 20, 2009, The New York Times reported that its parent company, the New York Times Company, had reached an agreement to borrow $250 million from Mexican billionaire Carlos Slim, "to help the newspaper company finance its businesses". The New York Times Company later repaid that loan ahead of schedule. Slim subsequently bought large quantities of the company's Class A shares, which are available for purchase by the public and offer less control over the company than Class B shares, which are privately held. Slim's investments in the company included large purchases of Class A shares in 2011, when he increased his stake in the company to 8.1% of Class A shares, and again in 2015, when he exercised stock options—acquired as part of a repayment plan on the 2009 loan—to purchase 15.9 million Class A shares, making him the largest shareholder.

As of March 7, 2016, Slim owned 17.4% of the company's Class A shares, according to annual filings submitted by the company. While Slim became the largest shareholder in the company, his investment only allowed him to vote for Class A directors, a third of the company's board. In December 2017, Slim reportedly cut his stake in The New York Times by half, reducing his ownership to approximately 8%. By 2021, Slim was no longer listed among "principal holders of common stock" (i.e. greater than 5% ownership) in the company's annual proxy statement.

=== Board of directors ===
As of November 2025:

- A. G. Sulzberger, chairman of The New York Times Company and publisher of The New York Times
- Amanpal S. Bhutani, CEO of GoDaddy
- Manuel Bronstein, former CPO of Roblox
- Beth Brooke, former global vice chair of public policy for Ernst & Young
- Rachel Glaser, former CFO of Etsy
- Arthur Golden, best-selling author
- Meredith Kopit Levien, president and CEO of The New York Times Company
- Brian P. McAndrews, former president, CEO, and chairman of Pandora Media
- David Perpich, vice chairman of The New York Times Company, and publisher of The Athletic
- John W. Rogers Jr., founder and chairman of Ariel Investments
- Anuradha B. Subramanian, CFO of Beast Industries
- Margot Golden Tishler, chair of the Ochs-Sulzberger Trust
- Rebecca Van Dyck, CMO of Airbnb

== Community awards ==
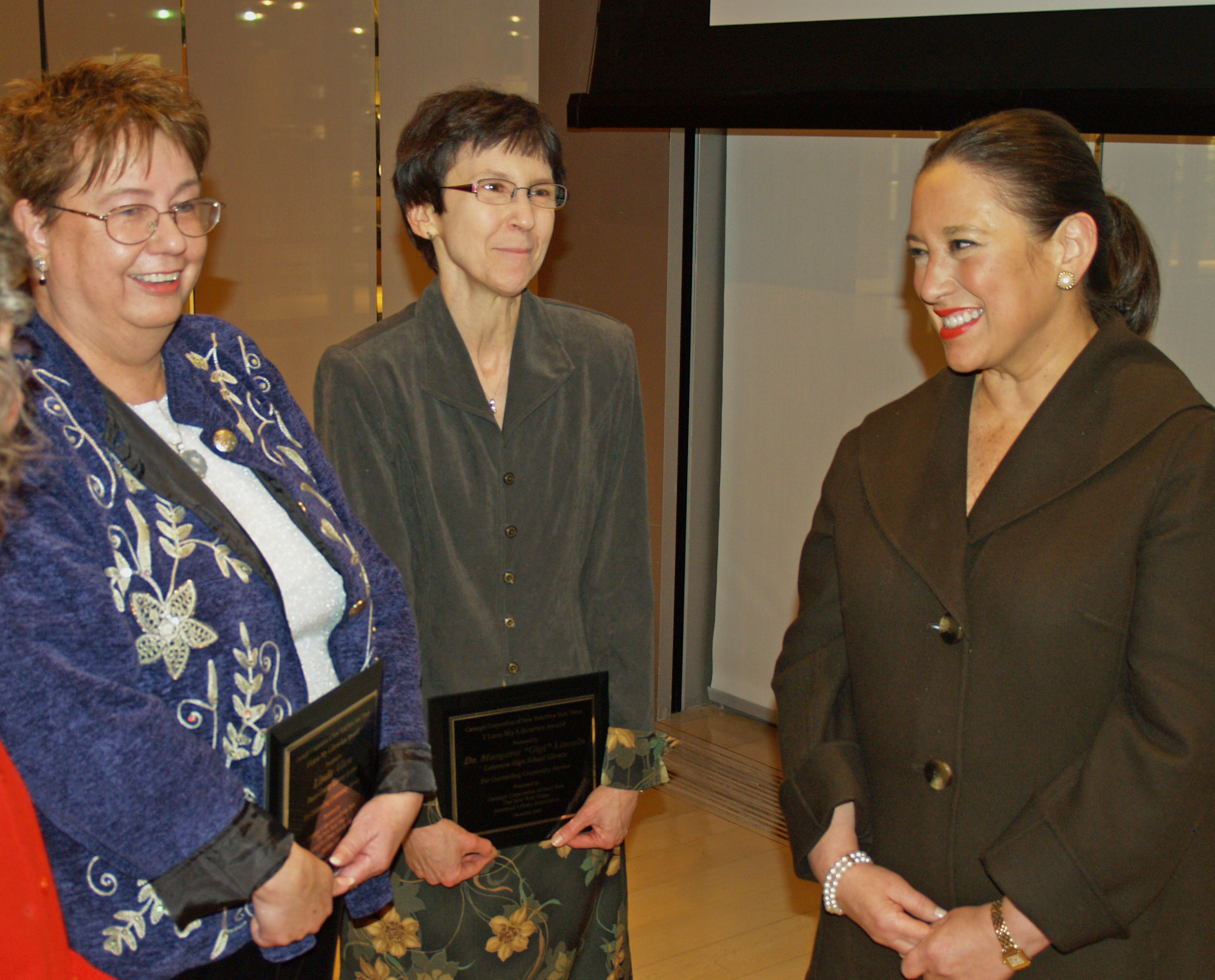
2008 I Love My Librarian award recipients Linda Allen and Margaret "Gigi" Lincoln talk with Janet Robinson in the New York Times Building.

The company sponsors a series of national and local awards designed to highlight the achievements of individuals and organizations in different realms.

In 2007, it inaugurated its first Nonprofit Excellence Award, awarded to four organizations "for the excellence of their management practices". Only nonprofits in New York City, Long Island, or Westchester were eligible.

Jointly with the Carnegie Corporation of New York and the American Library Association, the New York Times Company sponsors an award to honor librarians "for service to their communities". The I Love My Librarian! award was given to ten recipients in December 2008, and presented by the New York Times Company president and CEO Janet L. Robinson, Carnegie Corporation president Vartan Gregorian, and Jim Rettig, president of the American Library Association. The award has been given to ten exceptional librarians annually since that date.

In May 2009, the company launched The New York Times Outstanding Playwright Award to honor an American playwright who had recently had his or her professional debut in New York. The first winner was Tarell Alvin McCraney for his play "The Brothers Size". In 2010, Dan LeFranc won for his play "Sixty Miles to Silver Lake".

== See also ==
- List of companies based in New York City
