= Jason Levien =

American sports executive

- Born: 1973 (age 52–53); New York City, U.S.
- Education: Pomona College (BA); University of Michigan (JD)
- Known for: Co-Chairman of D.C. United: Former CEO of Memphis Grizzlies; Chairman of Brisbane Bullets
- Spouse: Meredith Kopit Levien (divorced)
- Children: One

Jason M. Levien (born 1973) is an American sports executive and investor. He is the CEO and Co-Chairman of Major League Soccer club D.C. United and the Chairman of the Brisbane Bullets, an Australian basketball club.

Levien is the former CEO and Managing Partner of the NBA's Memphis Grizzlies. He is the founder and principal of investment firm Neivel Capital and 82nd Street Partners and an adjunct professor of law at the University of Michigan Law School. His net worth has been estimated to be over $290 million.

== Early life ==
He was born into a Jewish family and raised in Metropolitan New York. He celebrated his bar mitzvah in Israel. His father worked as an attorney and business executive, representing athletes and sports professionals including Hector "Macho" Camacho, while his mother was a teacher. Levien played on the basketball team during his time at Pomona College, where he graduated in 1993. He later attended the University of Michigan School of Law where he was an editor of the law review.

== Career ==
=== Legal work, sports agency, law school adjunct ===
In 1998, as a licensed attorney, he started work at the Washington, D.C., law firm of Williams & Connolly where he assisted in representing professional athletes. He then went on to work as a member of the front offices of the Sacramento Kings and Memphis Grizzlies in the NBA. He also was an adjunct professor at the UC Berkeley School of Law where he taught sports law.

In 2005, he negotiated a $33 million deal with the Miami Heat on behalf of Udonis Haslem. In 2007, Levien negotiated a $55 million deal with the Sacramento Kings on behalf of the Kings' leading scorer, Kevin Martin. On July 31, 2008, Levien negotiated what was the largest contract in the history of the Chicago Bulls, a six-year, $80 million agreement for his client, Luol Deng. Levien also represented Omri Casspi and Yotam Halperin, two of the first Israeli players drafted into the NBA, Ukrainian-born center, Kyrylo Fesenko, Courtney Lee, Hedo Türkoğlu and Earnest Graham, among others. An article chronicling three of Levien's clients drafted by the NBA in 2006, appeared in The New York Times' Play Magazine in October 2006.

=== Philadelphia 76ers ===
In 2011, Levien emerged as part of an investment group along with Josh Harris, David Blitzer, Michael Rubin and actor Will Smith that purchased the Philadelphia 76ers.

Levien sold his stake in the Sixers to join new Memphis Grizzlies owner Robert Pera's ownership group. He was named club CEO. Pera is the chairman and controlling owner. His partners include Justin Timberlake, Peyton and Ashley Manning, Harold Ford Jr. and Penny Hardaway. Levien oversaw the Memphis Grizzlies' basketball and business operations from 2012 until June 2014, hiring then-head coach Dave Joerger and current VP of Basketball Operations John Hollinger. The team posted a 106–58 regular season record from 2012 thru the 2013–14 season and won more playoff games in that two-season period than it had won in the franchise's history, including its first ever trip to the Western Conference Finals. In 2013, ESPN The Magazine's Ultimate Standings named the Memphis Grizzlies as the best sports franchise in North America. His tenure as Grizzlies CEO ended on May 19, 2014.

=== D.C. United ===
In 2012, Levien and fellow Sixers minority owner Erick Thohir were named new majority owners for Major League Soccer club D.C. United, with the goal to get a soccer stadium built for the team.

In 2014, Levien led the successful efforts for a public-private economic development project with the District of Columbia for a new stadium in Washington, DC. MLS Commissioner Don Garber stated on December 2, 2014: "Jason has done an incredible job," Garber said. "He has been laser-focused on trying to build consensus and do a deal that would be good for the District, good for ownership, and ultimately soccer in America will benefit." The stadium development project received the 2019 D.C. Chamber of Commerce Economic Impact Award.

=== Swansea City ===
In April 2016, it was reported that Levien, along with Steve Kaplan, were in talks with Swansea City, a British football club playing in the highest tier of English football, the Premier League, with the aim of taking a "controlling interest" in the club. Under their ownership, the club was relegated from the Premier League at the end of the 2017–18 season. In November 2024 it was announced that Levien along with Steve Kaplan were selling their shares within the club.

=== Brisbane Bullets ===
In September 2019, Levien was part of a consortium that acquired a 75% interest in the Brisbane Bullets, an Australian basketball club playing in the Australian National Basketball League (NBL).

Levien serves as Chairman of the Bullets and his partners include NBA Hall of Famer George Gervin, and NBA Champion Khris Middleton.

Levien is also an investor in media, hospitality, real estate and technology.

== Personal life ==
Levien has also served as a Democratic strategist and campaign consultant. He was credited as the speechwriter for the keynote speech at the 2000 Democratic National Convention in Los Angeles given by Congressman Harold Ford Jr. Levien and Ford have also co-authored a policy essay on campaign finance reform published by the Harvard Journal on Legislation.

Levien has appeared as a weekly on-air commentator on WFOR-TV in Miami until 2006, and has been a guest on ESPN, ESPNews and National Public Radio regarding the business of professional sports and the NBA's Collective Bargaining Agreement. He is divorced from Meredith Kopit Levien; they have one child.
