= Meredith Kopit Levien =

American publisher (born 1971)

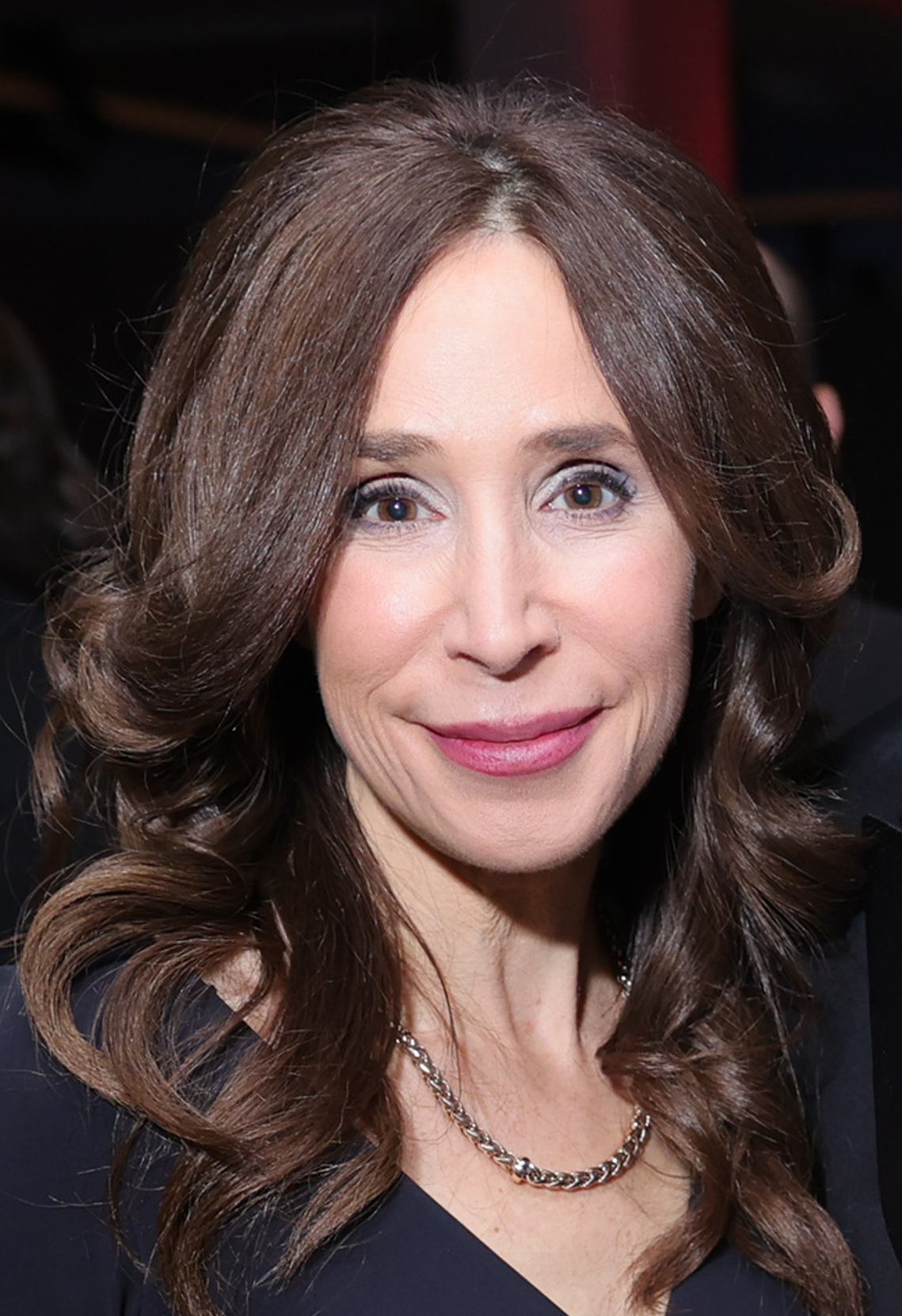
- Meredith Levien in 2023
- Born: Meredith Andrea Kopit; February 28, 1971 (age 55)
- Education: University of Virginia (BA)
- Occupation: Media executive
- Known for: Chief executive officer of The New York Times Company
- Spouse: Jason Levien (divorced)
- Children: 1

Meredith Andrea Kopit Levien (née Kopit; born February 28, 1971) is an American media executive who is the chief executive officer of The New York Times Company.

== Early life and education ==
Meredith Andrea Kopit was raised in Richmond, Virginia, the daughter of Carole and Marvin Kopit. She has one sister, Barbara. As a youth, she was a member of the B'nai B'rith Youth Organization Jewish Group (she remains on its advisory council today). She graduated from the University of Virginia where she majored in rhetoric and worked at the college newspaper, The Cavalier Daily.

== Career ==
After college, she worked at The Advisory Board Company, a consulting firm founded by David G. Bradley and then for the digital agency i33/AppNet. After Bradley bought Atlantic Media (publisher of The Atlantic), he recruited her in 2003 as an advertising director. In 2006, Levien became the first publisher of Atlantic Media's magazine 02138.

In April 2008, she joined Forbes Media where she ran Forbes Life magazine. She focused on the digital side of the magazine which helped in stemming losses. In 2010, the CEO, Tim Forbes, appointed her group publisher. She implemented programmatic buying (where the purchase of advertisements is done through online media) and Brandvoice, which allows advertisers to create their own content under the Forbes logo. This new method of advertising, denominated as native advertising, has been criticized for blurring the line between editorial and advertising. In 2012, she was named chief revenue officer at Forbes Media.

In July 2013, she was appointed head of advertising at The New York Times Company by CEO Mark Thompson to help to stem the decline in advertising revenues (which had declined from a peak of $1.3 billion in 2000 to $667 million in 2013). She refocused The New York Times toward digital content and sales, hiring 80 new employees with Internet skills and offered severance packages to 40 long-serving employees. She introduced native advertising under the name "Paid Posts" to increase advertising revenue; clients include Netflix, Chevron, Dell and MetLife.

In April 2015, she was promoted to chief revenue officer of The New York Times, responsible for all advertising and subscription revenue. She hired the former Pinterest executive David Rubin to be The Times' head of brand. She oversaw the development of The Times' first brand marketing since 2010, which began with the "Truth is Hard" campaign. She changed the company's advertising sales strategy from display advertisements to non-traditional, longer-term advertising partnerships. In June 2017, she was promoted to chief operating officer of The New York Times, managing "the teams responsible for digital product, design, audience and brand, and consumer revenue and advertising". Under her stewardship, The Times reported record subscription growth.

She has described the company's business model as "make something worth paying for", and changed the model into a direct-to-consumer business. Levien has said the company's digital products should be "as addictive and unrivaled as the journalism itself", and has spoken out in defense of local news, saying "quality, original, independent journalism at the local level is... foundational to community, to society, and ultimately to democracy". In July 2020, she was named president and chief executive of The New York Times Company, effective from September 8, 2020. She also joined the New York Times Company's board.

Levein at the 2026 Status Summit

Levien was a Henry Crown Fellow at the Aspen Institute in 2016. In 2017, she was named one of the "50 most innovative CMOs in the world" by Business Insider. Levien was included in Adweek's 2018 list of "50 Indispensable Media, Marketing and Tech Players" and 2019 "Publishing Hot List", in which she was named Executive of the Year. She was listed in the Fortune's list of Most Powerful Women in 2023.

== Personal life ==
She has a son with Jason Levien; they later divorced.
