= Will Chang =

Japanese-American sports businessman

USA Rugby – Board of Directors San Francisco Giants – Investor

Personal details
- Born: Japan
- Education: Harvard University

William H.C. Chang (张慧中) is a Japanese-American sports businessman. He has ownership interests in multiple sports teams. Chang is an investor in the San Francisco Giants of Major League Baseball. Chang is on the USA Rugby Board of Directors, and was chair of the USA Rugby committee bidding to host the 2018 Rugby World Cup Sevens. Chang is a former owner of DC United, selling his stake in 2016.

Chang was born in Japan. He holds a bachelor's degree in economics from Harvard University. Chang is based in San Mateo, California, and is a business magnate, real estate investor, and venture capitalist. Chang is Chairman of Westlake International Group, an international investment company, and runs Edge Venture Capital Fund and is a Founder and Managing Partner of Digikeyih.
