= List of Major League Soccer transfers 2024 =

Major League Soccer transfers in 2024

The following is a list of transfers for the 2024 Major League Soccer (MLS) season that have been made during the 2023–24 MLS offseason all the way through to the roster freeze.

== Transfers ==
List of 2024 MLS transfers
Date	Name	Moving from	Moving to	Mode of Transfer
November 22, 2023	(Switzerland) Maren Haile-Selassie	(Switzerland) FC Lugano	Chicago Fire FC	Transfer
November 28, 2023	(Argentina) Tomás Chancalay	(Argentina) Racing Club	New England Revolution	Transfer
December 1, 2023	(United States) Kyle Duncan	(Belgium) KV Oostende	New York Red Bulls	Transfer
December 1, 2023	(Brazil) Rodrigues	(Brazil) Grêmio	San Jose Earthquakes	Transfer
December 4, 2023	(Romania) Enes Sali	(Romania) Farul Constanța	FC Dallas	Transfer
December 4, 2023	(Portugal) Xande Silva	(France) Dijon	Atlanta United FC	Transfer
December 5, 2023	(United States) Christian Olivares	(United States) St. Louis City 2	St. Louis City SC	Free
December 7, 2023	(United States) Justin Rennicks	New England Revolution	(Finland) AC Oulu	Free
December 11, 2023	(Canada) Raheem Edwards	LA Galaxy	CF Montréal	Trade
December 11, 2023	(United States) Nick Lima	Austin FC	New England Revolution	Trade
December 11, 2023	(England) Dru Yearwood	New York Red Bulls	Nashville SC	Trade
December 12, 2023	(United States) Lucas Bartlett	St. Louis City SC	D.C. United	Trade
December 12, 2023	(Canada) Zorhan Bassong	(Romania) Farul Constanța	Sporting Kansas City	Free
December 12, 2023	(United States) Chris Durkin	D.C. United	St. Louis City SC	Trade
December 12, 2023	(United States) Andrew Gutman	Colorado Rapids	Chicago Fire FC	Trade
December 12, 2023	(Guatemala) Aaron Herrera	CF Montréal	D.C. United	Trade
December 12, 2023	(United States) Isaiah LeFlore	(United States) Houston Dynamo 2	Philadelphia Union	Free
December 12, 2023	(Venezuela) Miguel Navarro	Chicago Fire FC	Colorado Rapids	Trade
December 12, 2023	(Brazil) Ruan	D.C. United	CF Montréal	Trade
December 12, 2023	(United States) Jared Stroud	St. Louis City SC	D.C. United	Trade
December 13, 2023	(United States) Duran Ferree	(United States) San Diego Loyal SC	San Diego FC	Free
December 14, 2023	(Jamaica) Jonathan Bell	St. Louis City SC	Seattle Sounders FC	Re-Entry Draft, Stage One
December 14, 2023	(Peru) Wilder Cartagena	(United Arab Emirates) Ittihad Kalba	Orlando City SC	Transfer
December 14, 2023	(United States) Josh Cohen	(Israel) Maccabi Haifa	Atlanta United FC	Free
December 14, 2023	(United States) McKinze Gaines	Charlotte FC	Nashville SC	Trade
December 14, 2023	(United States) Preston Judd	LA Galaxy	San Jose Earthquakes	Trade
December 14, 2023	(United States) Kipp Keller	Austin FC	FC Cincinnati	Trade
December 14, 2023	(Colombia) Jáder Obrian	FC Dallas	Austin FC	Re-Entry Draft, Stage One
December 14, 2023	(United States) Nick Pariano	(United States) Duke Blue Devils	Philadelphia Union	Homegrown player
December 14, 2023	(United States) Alejandro Urzua	(United States) North Texas SC	FC Dallas	Homegrown player
December 15, 2023	(United States) Ethan Dobbelaere	Seattle Sounders FC	D.C. United	Waivers
December 15, 2023	(United States) Tomas Pondeca	(United States) North Texas SC	FC Dallas	Free
December 15, 2023	(United States) Garrison Tubbs	(United States) Wake Forest Demon Deacons	Atlanta United FC	Homegrown player
December 15, 2023	(Honduras) Alenis Vargas	(Costa Rica) Fútbol Consultants Desamparados	Sporting Kansas City	Transfer
December 16, 2023	(Brazil) Antônio Carlos	Orlando City SC	(Brazil) Fluminense	Transfer
December 16, 2023	(Costa Rica) Luis Díaz	Colorado Rapids	(Costa Rica) Saprissa	Free
December 18, 2023	(Mexico) Tony Alfaro	LA Galaxy	(United States) El Paso Locomotive FC	Free
December 18, 2023	(United States) Tom Barlow	New York Red Bulls	Chicago Fire FC	Trade
December 18, 2023	(United States) Malik Henry-Scott	(United States) Tusla Golden Hurricane	FC Dallas	Homegrown player
December 19, 2023	(Ghana) Stephen Annor Gyamfi	(United States) Virginia Cavaliers	Houston Dynamo FC	SuperDraft
December 19, 2023	(Spain) Miguel Berry	Atlanta United FC	LA Galaxy	Trade
December 19, 2023	(United States) Logan Farrington	(United States) Oregon State Beavers	FC Dallas	SuperDraft
December 19, 2023	(Trinidad and Tobago) Tyrese Spicer	(United States) Lipscomb Bisons	Toronto FC	SuperDraft
December 19, 2023	(Denmark) Mads Westergren	(United States) SMU Mustangs	FC Dallas	SuperDraft
December 20, 2023	(Ghana) Forster Ajago	(United States) Duke Blue Devils	Nashville SC	Free
December 20, 2023	(United States) Danny Crisotomo	Los Angeles FC	(United States) Tampa Bay Rowdies	Free
December 20, 2023	(United States) Omir Fernandez	New York Red Bulls	Colorado Rapids	Free
December 20, 2023	(Canada) Kimani Stewart-Baynes	(United States) Maryland Terrapins	Colorado Rapids	SuperDraft
December 21, 2023	(United States) Cameron Dunbar	Minnesota United FC	(United States) Orange County SC	Free
December 21, 2023	(Guatemala) Nicholas Hagen	(Israel) Bnei Sakhnin	Columbus Crew	Free
December 21, 2023	(United States) Derrick Jones	Charlotte FC	Columbus Crew	Free
December 21, 2023	(United States) John Nelson	St. Louis City SC	LA Galaxy	Free
December 21, 2023	(Norway) Tomas Totland	(Sweden) BK Häcken	St. Louis City SC	Transfer
December 21, 2023	(United States) Garrison Tubbs	Atlanta United FC	D.C. United	Trade
December 22, 2023	(United States) Jake LaCava	Inter Miami CF	(United States) Charleston Battery	Free
December 22, 2023	(Uruguay) Luis Suárez	(Brazil) Grêmio	Inter Miami CF	Free
December 22, 2023	(United States) Zidane Yañez	(United States) New York City FC Academy	New York City FC	Homegrown player
December 23, 2023	(Brazil) Judson	San Jose Earthquakes	(Brazil) Avaí	Free
December 24, 2023	(United States) Stefan Cleveland	Seattle Sounders FC	Austin FC	Free
December 25, 2023	(United States) Ethan Zubak	Nashville SC	(United States) Orange County SC	Free
December 29, 2023	(Israel) Gadi Kinda	Sporting Kansas City	(Israel) Maccabi Haifa	Free
December 29, 2023	(Croatia) Damir Kreilach	Real Salt Lake	Vancouver Whitecaps FC	Free
December 29, 2023	(United States) Stephen Turnbull	New York City FC	(United States) Rhode Island FC	Free
December 30, 2023	(United States) Tyler Boyd	LA Galaxy	Nashville SC	Trade
December 30, 2023	(France) Hugo Lloris	(England) Tottenham Hotspur	Los Angeles FC	Transfer
December 31, 2023	(Venezuela) Christian Makoun	New England Revolution	(Cyprus) Anorthosis Famagusta	Free
January 1, 2024	(United States) Davi Alexandre	(United States) New York Red Bulls II	New York Red Bulls	Homegrown player
January 1, 2024	(Argentina) Esequiel Barco	Atlanta United FC	(Argentina) River Plate	Transfer
January 1, 2024	(United States) Luke Brennan	(United States) Atlanta United 2	Atlanta United FC	Homegrown player
January 1, 2024	(Saint Kitts and Nevis) Ethan Bristow	Minnesota United FC	(England) Stockport County	Loan
January 1, 2024	(United States) Caden Clark	(Germany) RB Leipzig	Minnesota United FC	Transfer
January 1, 2024	(United States) Chance Cowell	(United States) San Jose Earthquakes II	San Jose Earthquakes	Free
January 1, 2024	(Panama) José Fajardo	D.C. United	(Panama) CAI	Free
January 1, 2024	(Brazil) Nick Firmino	(United States) Atlanta United 2	Atlanta United FC	Free
January 1, 2024	(Sweden) Emil Forsberg	(Germany) RB Leipzig	New York Red Bulls	Transfer
January 1, 2024	(United States) Malcolm Fry	(United States) New England Revolution II	New England Revolution	Homegrown player
January 1, 2024	(United States) Edwyn Mendoza	(United States) San Jose Earthquakes II	San Jose Earthquakes	Free
January 1, 2024	(United States) Peyton Miller	(United States) New England Revolution II	New England Revolution	Homegrown player
January 1, 2024	(Cameroon) Hassan Ndam	New York Red Bulls	(Finland) FC Haka	Free
January 1, 2024	(Denmark) Sanders Ngabo	(Denmark) Lyngby Boldklub	Philadelphia Union	Transfer
January 1, 2024	(Uruguay) Mauricio Pereyra	Orlando City SC	(Uruguay) Nacional	Free
January 1, 2024	(Brazil) Gabriel Pirani	(Brazil) Santos	D.C. United	Transfer
January 1, 2024	(England) Billy Sharp	LA Galaxy	(England) Hull City	Free
January 1, 2024	(United States) Adem Sipić	(United States) Nashville SC Academy	Nashville SC	Homegrown player
January 1, 2024	(United States) Aidan Stokes	(United States) New York Red Bulls II	New York Red Bulls	Homegrown player
January 1, 2024	(United States) Adyn Torres	(United States) Atlanta United 2	Atlanta United FC	Homegrown player
January 2, 2024	(Colombia) Yimmi Chará	Portland Timbers	(Colombia) Atlético Junior	Transfer
January 2, 2024	(Ecuador) Diego Palacios	Los Angeles FC	(Brazil) Corinthians	Free
January 2, 2024	(Ecuador) Gustavo Vallecilla	Colorado Rapids	(Ecuador) Universidad Católica	Free
January 3, 2024	(Colombia) Iván Angulo	(Brazil) Palmeiras	Orlando City SC	Transfer
January 3, 2024	(United States) Miles Robinson	Atlanta United FC	FC Cincinnati	Free
January 4, 2024	(Colombia) Michael Barrios	LA Galaxy	(Colombia) América de Cali	Free
January 4, 2024	(Ivory Coast) Franck Boli	Portland Timbers	(Mexico) San Luis	Free
January 4, 2024	(Democratic Republic of the Congo) Jojea Kwizera	CF Montréal	(United States) Rhode Island FC	Free
January 4, 2024	(Uruguay) Nicolás Lodeiro	Seattle Sounders FC	Orlando City SC	Free
January 4, 2024	(Ghana) Jonathan Mensah	San Jose Earthquakes	New England Revolution	Free
January 4, 2024	(Canada) Kamal Miller	Inter Miami CF	Portland Timbers	Trade
January 4, 2024	(United States) Alfredo Morales	New York City FC	San Jose Earthquakes	Free
January 4, 2024	(United States) Zack Steffen	(England) Manchester City	Colorado Rapids	Transfer
January 5, 2024	(Brazil) Maciel	New England Revolution	(United States) New England Revolution II	Free
January 5, 2024	(United States) John McCarthy	Los Angeles FC	LA Galaxy	Free
January 5, 2024	(United States) Jake Morris	Columbus Crew	(United States) Louisville City FC	Free
January 5, 2024	(United States) Trey Muse	(United States) Charleston Battery	Portland Timbers	Transfer
January 5, 2024	(Canada) James Pantemis	CF Montréal	Portland Timbers	Free
January 5, 2024	(Senegal) Mohamed Traore	Los Angeles FC	(United States) Phoenix Rising FC	Free
January 5, 2024	(Peru) Miguel Trauco	San Jose Earthquakes	(Brazil) Criciúma	Free
January 6, 2024	(Argentina) Leandro González Pírez	Inter Miami CF	(Argentina) River Plate	Transfer
January 6, 2024	(Slovakia) Henrich Ravas	(Poland) Widzew Łódź	New England Revolution	Transfer
January 6, 2024	(Japan) Miki Yamane	(Japan) Kawasaki Frontale	LA Galaxy	Transfer
January 8, 2024	(Brazil) Max Alves	Colorado Rapids	(Brazil) Cuiabá	Transfer
January 8, 2024	(Denmark) Nikolas Dyhr	(Denmark) Midtjylland	St. Louis City SC	Transfer
January 8, 2024	(United States) Djordje Mihailovic	(Netherlands) AZ	Colorado Rapids	Transfer
January 8, 2024	(United States) Alex Monis	Chicago Fire FC	(United States) New England Revolution II	Free
January 8, 2024	(United States) Collin Smith	FC Dallas	(United States) New England Revolution II	Free
January 9, 2024	(Brazil) Guilherme Biro	(Brazil) Mirassol	Austin FC	Transfer
January 9, 2024	(Honduras) Deybi Flores	(Hungary) Fehérvár	Toronto FC	Transfer
January 9, 2024	(United States) Julian Gressel	Columbus Crew	Inter Miami CF	Free
January 9, 2024	(United States) Dax McCarty	Nashville SC	Atlanta United FC	Free
January 9, 2024	(Colombia) Jhohan Romaña	Austin FC	(Argentina) San Lorenzo	Transfer
January 10, 2024	(United States) Adam Beaudry	(United States) Colorado Rapids Academy	Colorado Rapids	Homegrown player
January 10, 2024	(Dominican Republic) Israel Boatwright	(United States) Inter Miami CF II	Inter Miami CF	Homegrown player
January 10, 2024	(United States) Kevin Bonilla	(United States) Portland Pilots	Real Salt Lake	SuperDraft
January 10, 2024	(United States) Micah Burton	(United States) Austin FC II	Austin FC	Homegrown player
January 10, 2024	(United States) Omar Gonzalez	New England Revolution	FC Dallas	Free
January 10, 2024	(United States) Tyler Hall	(United States) Inter Miami CF II	Inter Miami CF	Homegrown player
January 10, 2024	(Germany) Jasper Löffelsend	Real Salt Lake	Colorado Rapids	Trade
January 10, 2024	(Sweden) Adam Lundqvist	Austin FC	(Sweden) BK Häcken	Free
January 10, 2024	(United States) Brandon Vázquez	FC Cincinnati	(Mexico) Monterrey	Transfer
January 11, 2024	(United States) Corey Baird	Houston Dynamo FC	FC Cincinnati	Free
January 11, 2024	(Mexico) Fidel Barajas	(United States) Charleston Battery	Real Salt Lake	Transfer
January 11, 2024	(Norway) Stian Rode Gregersen	(France) Bordeaux	Atlanta United FC	Transfer
January 11, 2024	(Argentina) Franco Ibarra	Atlanta United FC	(Argentina) Rosario Central	Loan
January 11, 2024	(Brazil) Nathan	San Jose Earthquakes	Seattle Sounders FC	Free
January 11, 2024	(Argentina) Matías Pellegrini	New York City FC	(Argentina) Vélez Sarsfield	Free
January 11, 2024	(Haiti) Fafà Picault	Nashville SC	Vancouver Whitecaps FC	Free
January 11, 2024	(Haiti) Nelson Pierre	Philadelphia Union	(Sweden) Skövde AIK	Loan
January 11, 2024	(United States) Keegan Tingey	San Jose Earthquakes	(United States) Loudoun United FC	Free
January 12, 2024	(Sweden) Noah Eile	(Sweden) Malmö FF	New York Red Bulls	Transfer
January 12, 2024	(United States) Kortne Ford	Sporting Kansas City	(United States) Sporting Kansas City II	Free
January 12, 2024	(Brazil) Luquinhas	New York Red Bulls	(Brazil) Fortaleza	Transfer
January 12, 2024	(United States) Jacob Murrell	(United States) Georgetown Hoyas	D.C. United	SuperDraft
January 12, 2024	(Canada) Luca Petrasso	Orlando City SC	(Italy) Triestina	Loan
January 12, 2024	(United States) Alex Rando	(United States) New York City FC II	New York City FC	Homegrown player
January 12, 2024	(Portugal) Braudílio Rodrigues	(United States) Tacoma Defiance	Seattle Sounders FC	Free
January 12, 2024	(Mexico) Pablo Sisniega	Charlotte FC	(United States) San Antonio FC	Free
January 12, 2024	(Republic of Ireland) Derrick Williams	D.C. United	Atlanta United FC	Re-Entry Draft, Stage Two
January 13, 2024	(United States) Donovan Pines	D.C. United	(England) Barnsley	Free
January 13, 2024	(Honduras) Romell Quioto	CF Montréal	(Iran) Tractor	Free
January 13, 2024	(Paraguay) Rodney Redes	Austin FC	(Paraguay) Olimpia	Free
January 13, 2024	(Venezuela) Jefferson Savarino	Real Salt Lake	(Brazil) Botafogo	Transfer
January 14, 2024	(United States) Roald Mitchell	(United States) Wake Forest Demon Deacons	New York Red Bulls	Homegrown player
January 14, 2024	(Guatemala) Rubio Rubin	Real Salt Lake	(Mexico) Querétaro	Loan
January 14, 2024	(Denmark) Tobias Salquist	(Denmark) Silkeborg IF	Chicago Fire FC	Transfer
January 15, 2024	(Honduras) Bryan Acosta	Portland Timbers	(Turkey) Gaziantep FK	Free
January 15, 2024	(Switzerland) Allan Arigoni	(Switzerland) FC Lugano	Chicago Fire FC	Loan
January 15, 2024	(Canada) Sebastian Breza	(Italy) Bologna	CF Montréal	Transfer
January 15, 2024	(United States) Cade Cowell	San Jose Earthquakes	(Mexico) Guadalajara	Transfer
January 15, 2024	(United States) Derek Dodson	(United States) Charleston Battery	Minnesota United FC	Free
January 15, 2024	(United States) Bryan Dowd	(United States) Notre Dame Fighting Irish	Chicago Fire FC	SuperDraft
January 15, 2024	(United States) Andrés Perea	Philadelphia Union	New York City FC	Trade
January 15, 2024	(United States) Kieran Sargeant	(United States) Georgetown Hoyas	Houston Dynamo FC	Homegrown player
January 15, 2024	(Uruguay) Joaquín Sosa	(Italy) Bologna	CF Montréal	Loan
January 16, 2024	(United States) Jordan Adebayo-Smith	New England Revolution	Minnesota United FC	Trade
January 16, 2024	(United States) Charlie Asensio	Austin FC	(United States) Orange County SC	Free
January 16, 2024	(Costa Rica) Alejandro Bran	(Costa Rica) Herediano	Minnesota United FC	Loan
January 16, 2024	(United States) Nathan Crockford	(United States) Wisconsin Badgers	D.C. United	SuperDraft
January 16, 2024	(Austria) Hannes Wolf	(Germany) Borussia Mönchengladbach	New York City FC	Transfer
January 16, 2024	(United States) William Yarbrough	Colorado Rapids	San Jose Earthquakes	Free
January 17, 2024	(Ecuador) Dixon Arroyo	Inter Miami CF	(Ecuador) Barcelona SC	Free
January 17, 2024	(United States) Simon Becher	Vancouver Whitecaps FC	(Denmark) AC Horsens	Transfer
January 17, 2024	(United States) Nico Benalcazar	New York City FC	(United States) FC Cincinnati 2	Free
January 17, 2024	(Argentina) Sebastián Blanco	Portland Timbers	(Argentina) San Lorenzo	Free
January 17, 2024	(Canada) Maxime Crépeau	Los Angeles FC	Portland Timbers	Free
January 17, 2024	(Trinidad and Tobago) Wayne Frederick	(United States) Duke Blue Devils	Colorado Rapids	SuperDraft
January 17, 2024	(Spain) Mario González	Los Angeles FC	(Spain) Sporting Gijón	Loan
January 17, 2024	(United States) Diego Gutierrez	Portland Timbers	(United States) Charleston Battery	Free
January 17, 2024	(United States) Taha Habroune	(United States) Columbus Crew 2	Columbus Crew	Homegrown player
January 17, 2024	(United States) Nate Jones	(United States) Washington Huskies	Colorado Rapids	SuperDraft
January 17, 2024	(Poland) Bartosz Slisz	(Poland) Legia Warsaw	Atlanta United FC	Transfer
January 18, 2024	(Senegal) Dominique Badji	FC Cincinnati	(Turkey) Bandırmaspor	Free
January 18, 2024	(Bolivia) Jamir Berdecio	(Bolivia) Oriente Petrolero	Philadelphia Union	Loan
January 18, 2024	(Germany) Noel Caliskan	Portland Timbers	(United States) Real Monarchs	Free
January 18, 2024	(United States) Adam Grinwis	Orlando City SC	(United States) Charleston Battery	Free
January 18, 2024	(United States) Chituru Odunze	(United States) Crown Legacy FC	Charlotte FC	Free
January 18, 2024	(Brazil) João Pedro	(Brazil) Athletico Paranaense	Charlotte FC	Transfer
January 18, 2024	(Germany) Max Schneider	St. Louis City SC	(United States) Indy Eleven	Free
January 19, 2024	(United States) Jackson Conway	Atlanta United FC	(United States) Charleston Battery	Free
January 19, 2024	(Luxembourg) Fred Emmings	Minnesota United FC	(United States) Minnesota United FC 2	Free
January 19, 2024	(Argentina) Santiago Sosa	Atlanta United FC	(Argentina) Racing Club	Loan
January 20, 2024	(Brazil) Caio Alexandre	Vancouver Whitecaps FC	(Brazil) Fortaleza	Transfer
January 21, 2024	(Iceland) Thorleifur Úlfarsson	Houston Dynamo FC	(Hungary) Debreceni VSC	Transfer
January 22, 2024	(United States) Eric Dick	Minnesota United FC	(United States) Pittsburgh Riverhounds SC	Free
January 22, 2024	(Sierra Leone) Malachi Jones	(United States) Lipscomb Bisons	New York City FC	SuperDraft
January 22, 2024	(Honduras) Andy Najar	D.C. United	(Honduras) Olimpia	Free
January 22, 2024	(United States) Miguel Perez	St. Louis City SC	(United States) Birmingham Legion FC	Loan
January 22, 2024	(United States) Sam Vines	(Belgium) Royal Antwerp	Colorado Rapids	Transfer
January 23, 2024	(Argentina) Nicolás Freire	(Mexico) UNAM	Inter Miami CF	Loan
January 23, 2024	(United States) Luke Haakenson	Nashville SC	(United States) San Antonio FC	Free
January 23, 2024	(United States) Cody Mizell	New York City FC	D.C. United	Trade
January 23, 2024	(Scotland) Sam Nicholson	Colorado Rapids	(Scotland) Motherwell	Free
January 23, 2024	(Argentina) Facundo Quignon	FC Dallas	(Argentina) Belgrano	Free
January 23, 2024	(United States) Tahir Reid-Brown	(United States) Orlando Cty SC Academy	Orlando City SC	Homegrown player
January 23, 2024	(Argentina) Maximiliano Urruti	Austin FC	(Argentina) Platense	Free
January 23, 2024	(Canada) Karifa Yao	Vancouver Whitecaps FC	(United States) Rhode Island FC	Free
January 24, 2024	(France) Rémi Cabral	(United States) Colorado Rapids 2	Colorado Rapids	Free
January 24, 2024	(France) Rémi Cabral	Colorado Rapids	(United States) Phoenix Rising FC	Loan
January 24, 2024	(Argentina) Pedro de la Vega	(Argentina) Lanús	Seattle Sounders FC	Transfer
January 24, 2024	(Italy) Lorenzo Dellavalle	(United States) Los Angeles FC 2	Los Angeles FC	Free
January 24, 2024	(United States) Nicholas Gioacchini	St. Louis City SC	(Italy) Como	Transfer
January 24, 2024	(Panama) Carlos Harvey	(United States) Phoenix Rising FC	Minnesota United FC	Transfer
January 24, 2024	(Mexico) Javier Hernández	LA Galaxy	(Mexico) Guadalajara	Free
January 25, 2024	(Canada) Jean-Aniel Assi	CF Montréal	(United States) Crown Legacy FC	Free
January 25, 2024	(Croatia) Stipe Biuk	Los Angeles FC	(Spain) Real Valladolid	Loan
January 25, 2024	(Ecuador) Patrickson Delgado	(Ecuador) Independiente del Valle	FC Dallas	Loan
January 25, 2024	(Sweden) Victor Eriksson	(Sweden) IFK Värnamo	Minnesota United FC	Transfer
January 25, 2024	(United States) Duran Ferree	San Diego FC	(United States) Orange County SC	Loan
January 25, 2024	(United States) Moses Nyeman	(Belgium) SK Beveren	Minnesota United FC	Transfer
January 26, 2024	(Uruguay) Nicolás Acevedo	New York City FC	(Brazil) Bahia	Loan
January 26, 2024	(Mexico) Tony Leone	Los Angeles FC	(Mexico) Monterrey	Free
January 26, 2024	(United States) Aidan O'Connor	(United States) Virginia Cavaliers	New York Red Bulls	SuperDraft
January 26, 2024	(England) Laurence Wyke	Nashville SC	(United States) Phoenix Rising FC	Free
January 27, 2024	(Argentina) Gastón González	Orlando City SC	(Uruguay) Nacional	Loan
January 28, 2024	(Colombia) Santiago Arias	FC Cincinnati	(Brazil) Bahia	Free
January 28, 2024	(Brazil) Douglas Costa	LA Galaxy	(Brazil) Fluminense	Free
January 29, 2024	(United States) Markus Anderson	(Spain) Rayo Majadahonda	Philadelphia Union	Transfer
January 29, 2024	(United States) Damian Las	Austin FC	(United States) Louisville City FC	Loan
January 29, 2024	(Venezuela) Miguel Navarro	Colorado Rapids	(Argentina) Talleres	Loan
January 29, 2024	(Bulgaria) Dominik Yankov	(Bulgaria) Ludogorets Razgrad	CF Montréal	Transfer
January 30, 2024	(United States) David Bingham	Portland Timbers	Charlotte FC	Free
January 30, 2024	(Mexico) Omar Campos	(Mexico) Santos Laguna	Los Angeles FC	Transfer
January 30, 2024	(United States) Chase Gasper	Houston Dynamo FC	Chicago Fire FC	Trade
January 30, 2024	(Brazil) Gabriel Pec	(Brazil) Vasco da Gama	LA Galaxy	Transfer
January 30, 2024	(Poland) Jan Sobociński	Charlotte FC	(Greece) PAS Giannina	Free
January 30, 2024	(Norway) Bjørn Inge Utvik	(Norway) Sarpsborg 08	Vancouver Whitecaps FC	Transfer
January 31, 2024	(Colombia) Tomás Ángel	(Colombia) Atlético Nacional	Los Angeles FC	Transfer
January 31, 2024	(Argentina) Gustavo Bou	New England Revolution	(Argentina) Talleres	Free
January 31, 2024	(Uruguay) Matías Cóccaro	(Argentina) Huracán	CF Montréal	Transfer
January 31, 2024	(Colombia) Ménder García	Minnesota United FC	(Colombia) Independiente Medellín	Free
January 31, 2024	(United States) Ahmed Longmire	Nashville SC	(United States) Spokane Velocity FC	Free
January 31, 2024	(Colombia) Marino Hinestroza	(Mexico) Pachuca	Columbus Crew	Transfer
January 31, 2024	(Spain) José Martínez	FC Dallas	(Spain) Córdoba CF	Free
January 31, 2024	(Germany) Oliver Semmle	(United States) Louisville City FC	Philadelphia Union	Transfer
January 31, 2024	(Argentina) Nicolás Stefanelli	Inter Miami CF	(Hungary) Fehérvár	Transfer
January 31, 2024	(Spain) Víctor Vázquez	Toronto FC	(India) East Bengal	Free
February 1, 2024	(Senegal) Lamine Diack	(France) Nantes	Colorado Rapids	Loan
February 1, 2024	(Poland) Kamil Jóźwiak	Charlotte FC	(Spain) Granada	Transfer
February 1, 2024	(Venezuela) David Martínez	(Venezuela) Monagas	Los Angeles FC	Transfer
February 1, 2024	(Sweden) Christopher McVey	Inter Miami CF	D.C. United	Trade
February 1, 2024	(Croatia) Petar Musa	(Portugal) Benfica	FC Dallas	Transfer
February 1, 2024	(United States) Danny Musovski	Real Salt Lake	Seattle Sounders FC	Free
February 1, 2024	(United States) Nebiyou Perry	Nashville SC	(Sweden) Östersunds FK	Free
February 1, 2024	(United States) Memo Rodríguez	Austin FC	Sporting Kansas City	Free
February 1, 2024	(Poland) Karol Swiderski	Charlotte FC	(Italy) Hellas Verona	Loan
February 1, 2024	(Libya) Ismael Tajouri-Shradi	Minnesota United FC	(Libya) Asswehly SC	Free
February 1, 2024	(Mexico) Christian Torres	Los Angeles FC	(Mexico) Tapatío	Free
February 1, 2024	(Scotland) Danny Wilson	Colorado Rapids	(Scotland) Queen's Park	Free
February 2, 2024	(Canada) Themi Antonoglou	Toronto FC	(Canada) Valour FC	Free
February 2, 2024	(United States) Cam Cilley	San Jose Earthquakes	(United States) St. Louis City 2	Free
February 2, 2024	(France) AB Cissoko	Seattle Sounders FC	(United States) Memphis 901 FC	Free
February 2, 2024	(Greece) Alexandros Katranis	(Poland) Piast Gliwice	Real Salt Lake	Transfer
February 2, 2024	(Argentina) Agustín Ojeda	(Argentina) Racing Club	New York City FC	Transfer
February 2, 2024	(Finland) Matti Peltola	(Finland) HJK Helsinki	D.C. United	Transfer
February 2, 2024	(United States) Justin Rasmussen	Portland Timbers	(United States) Oakland Roots SC	Free
February 2, 2024	(United States) Jayden Reid	New York Red Bulls	(United States) St. Louis City 2	Free
February 5, 2024	(Slovakia) Ján Greguš	Minnesota United FC	Houston Dynamo FC	Free
February 5, 2024	(Syria) Belal Halbouni	(Germany) 1. FC Magdeburg	Vancouver Whitecaps FC	Transfer
February 5, 2024	(Egypt) Ahmed Hamdi	CF Montréal	(Egypt) Zamalek	Free
February 5, 2024	(Nigeria) Chinonso Offor	CF Montréal	(Bulgaria) Arda Kardzhali	Loan
February 5, 2024	(Chile) Diego Rubio	Colorado Rapids	Austin FC	Free
February 5, 2024	(United States) Ryan Schewe	(United States) Georgetown Hoyas	Sporting Kansas City	SuperDraft
February 5, 2024	(Serbia) Strahinja Tanasijević	(Serbia) FK Spartak Subotica	New York City FC	Transfer
February 6, 2024	(United States) Joey Akpunonu	FC Cincinnati	(United States) Hartford Athletic	Loan
February 6, 2024	(United States) Kendall Burks	Chicago Fire FC	(United States) San Antonio FC	Free
February 6, 2024	(Belgium) Hugo Cuypers	(Belgium) Gent	Chicago Fire FC	Transfer
February 6, 2024	(Panama) Eric Davis	D.C. United	(Slovakia) FC Košice	Free
February 6, 2024	(France) Sofiane Djeffal	Austin FC	(United States) Orange County SC	Free
February 6, 2024	(United States) Chris Hegardt	Charlotte FC	(Norway) Stabæk	Free
February 6, 2024	(Spain) Jesús Jiménez	FC Dallas	(Greece) OFI Crete	Free
February 6, 2024	(Venezuela) Josef Martínez	Inter Miami CF	CF Montréal	Free
February 6, 2024	(Brazil) Vinicius Mello	Charlotte FC	(Serbia) FK Čukarički	Transfer
February 6, 2024	(El Salvador) Tomás Romero	Toronto FC	New York City FC	Free
February 6, 2024	(Uganda) Steven Sserwadda	New York Red Bulls	(United States) New York Red Bulls II	Free
February 7, 2024	(Sweden) Oskar Ågren	San Jose Earthquakes	(Sweden) IK Brage	Free
February 7, 2024	(Czech Republic) Pavel Bucha	(Czech Republic) Viktoria Plzeň	FC Cincinnati	Transfer
February 7, 2024	(Brazil) Vítor Costa	(Portugal) Marítimo	San Jose Earthquakes	Transfer
February 7, 2024	(Sierra Leone) Isaiah Jones	(United States) Huntsville City FC	Nashville SC	Homegrown player
February 8, 2024	(Brazil) Thiago Andrade	New York City FC	(China) Shenzhen Peng City	Loan
February 8, 2024	(Colombia) Eduard Atuesta	(Brazil) Palmeiras	Los Angeles FC	Loan
February 8, 2024	(Poland) Mikołaj Biegański	(Poland) Wisła Kraków	San Jose Earthquakes	Loan
February 8, 2024	(Slovenia) David Brekalo	(Norway) Viking FK	Orlando City SC	Transfer
February 8, 2024	(Suriname) Kelvin Leerdam	LA Galaxy	(Netherlands) Heracles Almelo	Free
February 8, 2024	(United States) Amar Sejdić	Atlanta United FC	Nashville SC	Free
February 8, 2024	(Portugal) Bruno Wilson	(Portugal) Vizela	San Jose Earthquakes	Transfer
February 9, 2024	(Argentina) Braian Galván	Colorado Rapids	(Argentina) Banfield	Transfer
February 9, 2024	(Cape Verde) Jamiro Monteiro	San Jose Earthquakes	(Turkey) Gaziantep FK	Free
February 9, 2024	(Norway) Amahl Pellegrino	(Norway) Bodø/Glimt	San Jose Earthquakes	Transfer
February 10, 2024	(Zimbabwe) Teenage Hadebe	Houston Dynamo FC	(Turkey) Konyaspor	Free
February 10, 2024	(Argentina) Matías Vera	Houston Dynamo FC	(Paraguay) Olimpia	Free
February 11, 2024	(Venezuela) Júnior Moreno	FC Cincinnati	(Saudi Arabia) Al-Hazem	Free
February 12, 2024	(England) Matt Crooks	(England) Middlesbrough	Real Salt Lake	Transfer
February 13, 2024	(United States) Kellyn Acosta	Los Angeles FC	Chicago Fire FC	Free
February 13, 2024	(Uruguay) Guzmán Corujo	Charlotte FC	(Serbia) FK Čukarički	Transfer
February 13, 2024	(France) Djibril Diani	(France) Caen	Charlotte FC	Transfer
February 13, 2024	(United States) Cameron Duke	Sporting Kansas City	(United States) Crown Legacy FC	Free
February 13, 2024	(United States) Brent Kallman	Minnesota United FC	Nashville SC	Free
February 13, 2024	(Czech Republic) Tomáš Vaclík	New England Revolution	(Spain) Albacete	Free
February 14, 2024	(United States) Conner Antley	(United States) Tampa Bay Rowdies	D.C. United	Transfer
February 14, 2024	(United States) Jahlane Forbes	(United States) Wake Forest Demon Deacons	Charlotte FC	SuperDraft
February 14, 2024	(United States) Jacob Greene	D.C. United	(United States) Columbus Crew 2	Free
February 14, 2024	(United States) Brendan Hines-Ike	D.C. United	Austin FC	Free
February 14, 2024	(United States) Kendall McIntosh	Sporting Kansas City	(United States) San Antonio FC	Free
February 14, 2024	(Haiti) Delentz Pierre	Real Salt Lake	(United States) Colorado Springs Switchbacks FC	Loan
February 14, 2024	(England) Tyger Smalls	(United States) Loyola Marymount Lions	Charlotte FC	SuperDraft
February 15, 2024	(United States) Brandan Craig	Philadelphia Union	(United States) El Paso Locomotive FC	Loan
February 15, 2024	(United States) Tyler Freeman	Nashville SC	(United States) Carolina Core FC	Free
February 15, 2024	(Sweden) Mikael Marqués	Minnesota United FC	(Sweden) Västerås SK	Loan
February 15, 2024	(Colombia) Luis Muriel	(Italy) Atalanta	Orlando City SC	Transfer
February 15, 2024	(Canada) Woobens Pacius	(Canada) Forge FC	Nashville SC	Free
February 15, 2024	(Serbia) Nikola Petković	(United States) Crown Legacy FC	Charlotte FC	Free
February 16, 2024	(Norway) Dennis Gjengaar	(Norway) Odds BK	New York Red Bulls	Transfer
February 16, 2024	(Canada) Junior Hoilett	Vancouver Whitecaps FC	(Scotland) Aberdeen	Free
February 16, 2024	(Poland) Kacper Przybylko	Chicago Fire FC	(Switzerland) FC Lugano	Transfer
February 16, 2024	(Colombia) Emerson Rodríguez	Inter Miami CF	(Colombia) Millonarios	Loan
February 16, 2024	(United States) Gabriel Segal	New York City FC	Houston Dynamo FC	Trade
February 17, 2024	(United States) Joe Bendik	Philadelphia Union	Vancouver Whitecaps FC	Free
February 19, 2024	(Dominican Republic) Edison Azcona	Inter Miami CF	(United States) Las Vegas Lights FC	Loan
February 19, 2024	(Jamaica) Matthew Bell	(United States) Marshall Thundering Herd	Real Salt Lake	SuperDraft
February 19, 2024	(Brazil) Gregore	Inter Miami CF	(Brazil) Botafogo	Transfer
February 19, 2024	(Jamaica) Kevon Lambert	Real Salt Lake	(United States) San Antonio FC	Loan
February 19, 2024	(Serbia) Jovan Mijatović	(Serbia) Red Star Belgrade	New York City FC	Transfer
February 19, 2024	(Costa Rica) Damian Rivera	New England Revolution	(United States) Tampa Bay Rowdies	Loan
February 20, 2024	(United States) Julian Gaines	Los Angeles FC	Nashville SC	Free
February 20, 2024	(Japan) Hosei Kijima	(United States) Wake Forest Demon Deacons	St. Louis City SC	SuperDraft
February 20, 2024	(United States) Jeorgio Kocevski	(United States) Syracuse Orange	Orlando City SC	SuperDraft
February 20, 2024	(Republic of Ireland) Kevin Long	(England) Birmingham City	Toronto FC	Transfer
February 20, 2024	(Cape Verde) Iuri Tavares	(United States) Crown Legacy FC	Charlotte FC	Free
February 21, 2024	(Nigeria) Ifunanyachi Achara	Houston Dynamo FC	(United States) Houston Dynamo 2	Free
February 21, 2024	(Ghana) Joseph Paintsil	(Belgium) Genk	LA Galaxy	Transfer
February 21, 2024	(United States) Jamar Ricketts	(United States) Cal State Northridge Matadors	San Jose Earthquakes	SuperDraft
February 21, 2024	(Mexico) Jairo Torres	Chicago Fire FC	(Mexico) FC Juárez	Free
February 21, 2024	(Brazil) Júnior Urso	Orlando City SC	Charlotte FC	Free
February 22, 2024	(United States) Beto Avila	Houston Dynamo FC	(United States) Sporting Kansas City II	Free
February 22, 2024	(United States) Antonio Carrera	FC Dallas	(United States) North Carolina FC	Loan
February 22, 2024	(United States) Michael Creek	St. Louis City SC	(United States) FC Tulsa	Free
February 22, 2024	(United States) Aboubacar Keita	Colorado Rapids	(Republic of Ireland) Bohemians	Loan
February 22, 2024	(Argentina) Joaquín Torres	Philadelphia Union	(Chile) Universidad Católica	Loan
February 23, 2024	(Cameroon) Aaron Bibout	(United States) LA Galaxy II	LA Galaxy	Free
February 23, 2024	(Germany) Morris Duggan	(United States) Marshall Thundering Herd	Minnesota United FC	SuperDraft
February 23, 2024	(France) Nicksoen Gomis	(England) Sheffield United U-21	Toronto FC	Free
February 23, 2024	(Canada) Richie Laryea	(England) Nottingham Forest	Toronto FC	Transfer
February 23, 2024	(United States) Tucker Lepley	(United States) UCLA Bruins	LA Galaxy	SuperDraft
February 23, 2024	(Argentina) Luca Orellano	(Brazil) Vasco da Gama	FC Cincinnati	Loan
February 23, 2024	(Argentina) Federico Redondo	(Argentina) Argentinos Juniors	Inter Miami CF	Transfer
February 23, 2024	(Brazil) Matheus Rossetto	Atlanta United FC	(Brazil) Fortaleza	Free
February 23, 2024	(Ivory Coast) Gaoussou Samaké	D.C. United	(United States) Las Vegas Lights FC	Free
February 23, 2024	(United States) Hunter Sulte	Portland Timbers	(United States) Indy Eleven	Loan
February 24, 2024	(Canada) Adam Pearlman	(Canada) Toronto FC II	Toronto FC	Homegrown player
February 24, 2024	(Senegal) Ousmane Sylla	(United States) Clemson Tigers	Houston Dynamo FC	SuperDraft
February 26, 2024	(United States) Keegan Hughes	Columbus Crew	(United States) Loudoun United FC	Loan
February 28, 2024	(Brazil) Héber	Seattle Sounders FC	(China) Cangzhou Mighty Lions	Free
February 29, 2024	(England) Matty Longstaff	(England) Newcastle United	Toronto FC	Free
March 1, 2024	(Argentina) Álvaro Barreal	FC Cincinnati	(Brazil) Cruzeiro	Loan
March 1, 2024	(United States) Rio Hope-Gund	(United States) New York City FC II	New York City FC	Free
March 1, 2024	(United States) Diego Rosales	Los Angeles FC	(United States) Los Angeles FC 2	Free
March 4, 2024	(United States) DeAndre Yedlin	Inter Miami CF	FC Cincinnati	Trade
March 5, 2024	(Spain) Hugo Bacharach	(United States) Indiana Hoosiers	Minnesota United FC	SuperDraft
March 5, 2024	(United States) Grayson Doody	(United States) UCLA Bruins	CF Montréal	SuperDraft
March 5, 2024	(South Sudan) Ryen Jiba	Minnesota United FC	(United States) Union Omaha	Free
March 5, 2024	(Brazil) Jean Mota	Inter Miami CF	(Brazil) Vitória	Transfer
March 5, 2024	(United States) Cole Mrowka	(United States) Columbus Crew 2	Columbus Crew	Homegrown player
March 5, 2024	(Canada) Sean Rea	CF Montréal	(Spain) CD Castellón B	Free
March 6, 2024	(Canada) Hugo Mbongue	Toronto FC	(United States) San Antonio FC	Loan
March 6, 2024	(Cameroon) J.C. Ngando	Vancouver Whitecaps FC	(United States) Las Vegas Lights FC	Loan
March 6, 2024	(United States) Hayden Sargis	D.C. United	(United States) Las Vegas Lights FC	Loan
March 6, 2024	(United States) Anton Sorenson	Philadelphia Union	(United States) Charlotte Independence	Free
March 7, 2024	(Israel) Liel Abada	(Scotland) Celtic	Charlotte FC	Transfer
March 7, 2024	(Canada) Kamron Habibullah	Vancouver Whitecaps FC	(United States) Sporting Kansas City II	Free
March 7, 2024	(Colombia) José Mulato	FC Dallas	(United States) San Antonio FC	Loan
March 7, 2024	(Nigeria) Mujeeb Murana	Houston Dynamo FC	(United States) Birmingham Legion FC	Free
March 7, 2024	(United States) Owen O'Malley	St. Louis City SC	(United States) Tacoma Defiance	Free
March 7, 2024	(United States) Abraham Rodriguez	Colorado Rapids	(Canada) Toronto FC II	Free
March 8, 2024	(Serbia) Marko Ilić	Colorado Rapids	(Norway) Sarpsborg 08	Loan
March 8, 2024	(United States) Brady Scott	Columbus Crew	LA Galaxy	Free
March 8, 2024	(United States) Paul Walters	FC Cincinnati	(United States) Hartford Athletic	Loan
March 12, 2024	(Canada) Ralph Priso	Colorado Rapids	Vancouver Whitecaps FC	Trade
March 12, 2024	(United States) Justin Reynolds	Chicago Fire FC	(Switzerland) FC Lugano	Loan
March 13, 2024	(Ghana) Latif Blessing	Toronto FC	Houston Dynamo FC	Trade
March 13, 2024	(El Salvador) Jeremy Garay	D.C. United	(United States) El Paso Locomotive FC	Loan
March 13, 2024	(Chile) Cristián Gutiérrez	Toronto FC	(Chile) Universidad de Concepción	Free
March 13, 2024	(England) Jack Price	Colorado Rapids	(England) Shrewsbury Town	Free
March 13, 2024	(United States) Missael Rodriguez	Chicago Fire FC	(United States) Union Omaha	Loan
March 15, 2024	(Puerto Rico) Wilfredo Rivera	Orlando City SC	(United States) Orlando City B	Free
March 16, 2024	(United States) Isaiah Parente	Columbus Crew	(United States) Ventura County FC	Free
March 18, 2024	(United States) Adrián Zendejas	Charlotte FC	(Sweden) Skövde AIK	Free
March 19, 2024	(Haiti) Carl Sainté	(United States) North Texas SC	FC Dallas	Free
March 20, 2024	(United States) Victor Bezerra	Chicago Fire FC	(United States) Detroit City FC	Loan
March 20, 2024	(Mexico) Daniel Ríos	(Mexico) Guadalajara	Atlanta United FC	Loan
March 20, 2024	(Uruguay) Jonathan Rodríguez	(Mexico) América	Portland Timbers	Transfer
March 21, 2024	(Ecuador) Marco Angulo	FC Cincinnati	(Ecuador) LDU Quito	Loan
March 21, 2024	(Australia) Alex Gersbach	Colorado Rapids	(Sweden) Kalmar FF	Free
March 21, 2024	(United States) Jonathan Jiménez	New York City FC	(United States) New York City FC II	Free
March 21, 2024	(Ghana) Samuel Owusu	New York City FC	(United States) New York City FC II	Free
March 22, 2024	(Italy) Yannick Bright	(United States) New Hampshire Wildcats	Inter Miami CF	SuperDraft
March 22, 2024	(United States) Tega Ikoba	Portland Timbers	(United States) Indy Eleven	Loan
March 22, 2024	(Trinidad and Tobago) Luke Singh	Toronto FC	(Canada) Atlético Ottawa	Loan
March 27, 2024	(Canada) Alessandro Biello	(Canada) CF Montréal Academy	CF Montréal	Homegrown player
March 27, 2024	(Luxembourg) Maxime Chanot	(France) AC Ajaccio	Los Angeles FC	Transfer
March 27, 2024	(United States) Adam Saldaña	LA Galaxy	(Norway) KFUM Oslo	Free
March 27, 2024	(Canada) Matteo Schiavoni	(Italy) Bologna	CF Montréal	Transfer
March 27, 2024	(Canada) Matteo Schiavoni	CF Montréal	(Canada) Forge FC	Loan
March 27, 2024	(Denmark) Mads Westergren	FC Dallas	(United States) North Texas SC	Loan
March 28, 2024	(Argentina) Yamil Asad	D.C. United	FC Cincinnati	Free
March 28, 2024	(Argentina) Marcelo Weigandt	(Argentina) Boca Juniors	Inter Miami CF	Loan
March 29, 2024	(Honduras) Roger Espinoza	Sporting Kansas City	(United States) Des Moines Menace	Free
March 29, 2024	(Sierra Leone) Kei Kamara	Chicago Fire FC	Los Angeles FC	Free
April 1, 2024	(Iraq) Justin Meram	Charlotte FC	(United States) Michigan Stars FC	Free
April 2, 2024	(Brazil) Leo Afonso	(United States) Inter Miami CF II	Inter Miami CF	Free
April 2, 2024	(South Sudan) Machop Chol	Atlanta United FC	(United States) San Antonio FC	Free
April 2, 2024	(Colombia) Emiro Garcés	(Colombia) Deportivo Pereira	LA Galaxy	Loan
April 2, 2024	(Colombia) Fredy Montero	Seattle Sounders FC	(Colombia) Deportivo Cali	Free
April 3, 2024	(England) Laurence Wootton	(United States) Ohio State Buckeyes	Chicago Fire FC	SuperDraft
April 3, 2024	(England) Laurence Wootton	Chicago Fire FC	(United States) Indy Eleven	Loan
April 4, 2024	(Guatemala) Arquimides Ordóñez	FC Cincinnati	(Sweden) Östersunds FK	Loan
April 4, 2024	(Iceland) Róbert Orri Þorkelsson	CF Montréal	(Norway) Kongsvinger IL Toppfotball	Loan
April 8, 2024	(Canada) Matteo Campagna	Vancouver Whitecaps FC	(Canada) Vancouver FC	Free
April 16, 2024	(United States) Ozzie Cisneros	Sporting Kansas City	(United States) Carolina Core FC	Loan
April 18, 2024	(United States) Matthew Real	Philadelphia Union	(United States) Colorado Springs Switchbacks FC	Loan
April 19. 2024	(United States) Philip Quinton	Columbus Crew	Real Salt Lake	Trade
April 22, 2024	(United States) McKinze Gaines	Nashville SC	Houston Dynamo FC	Trade
April 23, 2024	(Ecuador) Xavier Arreaga	Seattle Sounders FC	New England Revolution	Trade
April 23, 2024	(Slovenia) Aljaž Ivačič	Portland Timbers	New England Revolution	Free
April 23, 2024	(Paraguay) Matías Rojas	(Brazil) Corinthians	Inter Miami CF	Free
April 24, 2024	(Australia) Giuseppe Bovalina	(Australia) Adelaide United FC	Vancouver Whitecaps FC	Transfer
April 24, 2024	(Haiti) Derrick Etienne Jr.	Atlanta United FC	Toronto FC	Trade
April 25, 2024	(United States) Ethan Bandré	(United States) Colorado Rapids 2	Colorado Rapids	Free
April 25, 2024	(Argentina) Hernán López	(Argentina) Godoy Cruz	San Jose Earthquakes	Transfer
April 26, 2024	(Ecuador) Jefferson Valverde	(Ecuador) L.D.U. Quito	Houston Dynamo FC	Transfer
April 29, 2024	(United States) Jacob Jackson	New England Revolution	San Jose Earthquakes	Waivers
April 29, 2024	(United States) David Vazquez	(United States) Philadelphia Union II	Philadelphia Union	Homegrown player
April 30, 2024	(Venezuela) Kevin Kelsy	(Ukraine) FC Shakhtar Donetsk	FC Cincinnati	Loan
May 2, 2024	(United States) Luis Zamudio	D.C. United	(United States) Colorado Springs Switchbacks FC	Loan
May 4, 2024	(Germany) Luis Müller	(United States) Los Angeles FC 2	Los Angeles FC	Free
May 5, 2024	(United States) Andrew Rick	(United States) Philadelphia Union II	Philadelphia Union	Homegrown player
May 7, 2024	(Curaçao) Nigel Robertha	D.C. United	(United Arab Emirates) Ittihad Kalba	Free
May 9, 2024	(United States) Cavan Sullivan	(United States) Philadelphia Union Academy	Philadelphia Union	Homegrown player
May 10, 2024	(United States) Jack Panayotou	New England Revolution	(United States) Rhode Island FC	Loan
May 16, 2024	(Argentina) Enzo Copetti	Charlotte FC	(Argentina) Rosario Central	Transfer
May 21, 2024	(United States) Stefan Chirila	(United States) FC Cincinnati 2	FC Cincinnati	Homegrown player
May 22, 2024	(United States) Derek Dodson	Minnesota United FC	(United States) Birmingham Legion FC	Loan
May 24, 2024	(United States) Nick DePuy	Nashville SC	(United States) Huntsville City FC	Free
May 27, 2024	(France) Kemy Amiche	Nashville SC	(United States) Asheville City SC	Free
May 30, 2024	(Argentina) Emanuel Reynoso	Minnesota United FC	(Mexico) Club Tijuana	Transfer
June 5, 2024	(Canada) Thomas Hasal	Vancouver Whitecaps FC	Los Angeles FC	Free
June 7, 2024	(United States) Andres Jasson	New York City FC	(Denmark) AaB	Transfer
June 10, 2024	(United States) Daniel Aguirre	LA Galaxy	(Mexico) Guadalajara	Transfer
June 16, 2024	(Greece) Giorgos Giakoumakis	Atlanta United FC	(Mexico) Cruz Azul	Transfer
June 18, 2024	(Denmark) Nikolas Dyhr	St. Louis City SC	(Denmark) Randers FC	Transfer
June 22, 2024	(United States) John Klein	(United States) St. Louis City 2	St. Louis City SC	Free
June 27, 2024	(United States) Frankie Amaya	New York Red Bulls	(Mexico) Toluca	Transfer
June 27, 2024	(Colombia) José Mulato	FC Dallas	(Serbia) FK Spartak Subotica	Transfer
June 28, 2024	(United States) Aidan Morris	Columbus Crew	(England) Middelsbrough	Transfer
June 29, 2024	(Sweden) Victor Eriksson	Minnesota United FC	(Sweden) Hammarby IF	Transfer
June 29, 2024	(Liberia) Jimmy Farkarlun	(United States) Austin FC II	Austin FC	Transfer
June 30, 2024	(Honduras) Kervin Arriaga	Minnesota United FC	(Serbia) Partizan Belgrade	Transfer
June 30, 2024	(Argentina) Julián Carranza	Philadelphia Union	(Netherlands) Feyenoord	Transfer
July 1, 2024	(Canada) Zachary Brault-Guillard	CF Montréal	(Switzerland) FC Lugano	Free
July 1, 2024	(United States) Marcus Ferkranus	LA Galaxy	(Australia) Brisbane Roar	Transfer
July 1, 2024	(Nigeria) Emmanuel Iwe	Minnesota United FC	(Germany) SV Sandhausen	Free
July 2, 2024	(Mexico) Fidel Barajas	Real Salt Lake	(Mexico) Guadalajara	Transfer
July 3, 2024	(Canada) Ayo Akinola	Toronto FC	(Switzerland) FC Wil	Free
July 3, 2024	(England) Jonathan Bond	LA Galaxy	(England) Watford	Free
July 3, 2024	(United States) Michael Wentzel	(United States) St. Louis City 2	St. Louis City SC	Free
July 6, 2024	(Argentina) Thiago Almada	Atlanta United FC	(Brazil) Botafogo	Transfer
July 8, 2024	(Croatia) Stipe Biuk	Los Angeles FC	(Spain) Real Valladolid	Transfer
July 9, 2024	(Colombia) Dairon Asprilla	Portland Timbers	(Colombia) Atlético Nacional	Transfer
July 9, 2024	(Dominican Republic) Edison Azcona	Inter Miami CF	(United States) Las Vegas Lights FC	Transfer
July 12, 2024	(Canada) Scott Arfield	Charlotte FC	(England) Bolton Wanderers	Free
July 12, 2024	(United States) Isaiah Parente	(United States) Ventura County FC	LA Galaxy	Free
July 12, 2024	(England) Tom Pearce	(England) Wigan Athletic	CF Montréal	Free
July 13, 2024	(Senegal) Hamady Diop	Charlotte FC	(Serbia) FK Čukarički	Loan
July 14, 2024	(Slovakia) Henrich Ravas	New England Revolution	(Poland) KS Cracovia	Transfer
July 15, 2024	(Serbia) Marko Ilić	Colorado Rapids	(Serbia) Red Star Belgrade	Transfer
July 16, 2024	(Poland) Dawid Bugaj	(Italy) SPAL	CF Montréal	Transfer
July 16, 2024	(Mali) Bakaye Dibassy	Minnesota United FC	(France) Valenciennes	Free
July 16, 2024	(Colombia) Emerson Rodríguez	Inter Miami CF	(Brazil) Vasco da Gama	Loan
July 18, 2024	(United States) Samuel Adeniran	St. Louis City SC	Philadelphia Union	Trade
July 18, 2024	(Portugal) Pedro Amador	(Portugal) Moreirense	Atlanta United FC	Free
July 18, 2024	(Senegal) Dominique Badji	(Turkey) Bandırmaspor	D.C. United	Free
July 18, 2024	(Ghana) Osman Bukari	(Serbia) Red Star Belgrade	Austin FC	Transfer
July 18, 2024	(France) Dylan Chambost	(France) Saint-Étienne	Columbus Crew	Transfer
July 18, 2024	(Denmark) Mikkel Desler	(France) Toulouse FC	Austin FC	Free
July 18, 2024	(Germany) Lawrence Ennali	(Poland) Górnik Zabrze	Houston Dynamo FC	Transfer
July 18, 2024	(Australia) Jake Girdwood-Reich	(Australia) Sydney FC	St. Louis City SC	Transfer
July 18, 2024	(France) Olivier Giroud	(Italy) AC Milan	Los Angeles FC	Free
July 18, 2024	(Germany) Marcel Hartel	(Germany) FC St. Pauli	St. Louis City SC	Transfer
July 18, 2024	(United States) Aziel Jackson	St. Louis City SC	Columbus Crew	Trade
July 18, 2024	(Argentina) Ezequiel Ponce	(Greece) AEK Athens	Houston Dynamo FC	Transfer
July 18, 2024	(Austria) David Schnegg	(Austria) Sturm Graz	D.C. United	Transfer
July 18, 2024	(England) Samuel Shashoua	(Spain) Albacete	Minnesota United FC	Free
July 18, 2024	(Ukraine) Oleksandr Svatok	(Ukraine) SC Dnipro-1	Austin FC	Transfer
July 18, 2024	(Germany) Cedric Teuchert	(Germany) Hannover 96	St. Louis City SC	Free
July 18, 2024	(United States) Henry Wingo	(Hungary) Ferencváros	Toronto FC	Free
July 19, 2024	(United States) Tomás Gómez	Real Salt Lake	(United States) Orange County SC	Loan
July 19, 2024	(United States) Aiden McFadden	Atlanta United FC	(United States) Louisville City FC	Transfer
July 19, 2024	(United States) Benji Michel	(Portugal) Arouca	Real Salt Lake	Free
July 19, 2024	(New Zealand) Finn Surman	(New Zealand) Wellington Phoenix	Portland Timbers	Transfer
July 22, 2024	(Angola) Manuel Cafumana	(Israel) Maccabi Haifa	FC Dallas	Loan
July 22, 2024	(United States) Grayson Doody	CF Montréal	(United States) Las Vegas Lights FC	Loan
July 22, 2024	(Cameroon) Boris Enow	(Israel) Maccabi Netanya	D.C. United	Transfer
July 22, 2024	(Senegal) Mamadou Fall	Los Angeles FC	(Spain) Barcelona	Transfer
July 22, 2024	(United States) Ousman Jabang	CF Montréal	(United States) Las Vegas Lights FC	Loan
July 22, 2024	(United States) Caleb Wiley	Atlanta United FC	(England) Chelsea	Transfer
July 22, 2024	(Australia) Patrick Yazbek	(Norway) Viking FK	Nashville SC	Transfer
July 23, 2024	(United States) Simon Becher	(Denmark) AC Horsens	St. Louis City SC	Loan
July 23, 2024	(Australia) Lachlan Brook	(Australia) Western Sydney Wanderers	Real Salt Lake	Transfer
July 23, 2024	(United States) Mason Toye	CF Montréal	Portland Timbers	Trade
July 25, 2024	(Nigeria) Chidozie Awaziem	(Portugal) Boavista	FC Cincinnati	Transfer
July 25, 2024	(Paraguay) David Martínez	(Argentina) River Plate	Inter Miami CF	Loan
July 25, 2024	(Northern Ireland) Paddy McNair	(England) Middlesbrough	San Diego FC	Free
July 25, 2024	(Northern Ireland) Paddy McNair	San Diego FC	(England) West Bromwich Albion	Loan
July 26, 2024	(Colombia) Marino Hinestroza	Columbus Crew	(Colombia) Atlético Nacional	Loan
July 26, 2024	(Kenya) Richard Odada	Philadelphia Union	(Scotland) Dundee United	Transfer
July 26, 2024	(Cyprus) Marinos Tzionis	Sporting Kansas City	(Serbia) FK Čukarički	Transfer
July 27, 2024	(Italy) Kelvin Yeboah	(Italy) Genoa	Minnesota United FC	Transfer
July 29, 2024	(Colombia) Jefferson Díaz	(Colombia) Deportivo Cali	Minnesota United FC	Transfer
July 30, 2024	(Russia) Alexey Miranchuk	(Italy) Atalanta	Atlanta United FC	Transfer
July 30, 2024	(England) Lewis O'Brien	(England) Nottingham Forest	Los Angeles FC	Loan
July 30, 2024	(Mexico) Jonny Pérez	LA Galaxy	Nashville SC	Loan
July 31, 2024	(Jamaica) Javain Brown	Vancouver Whitecaps FC	Real Salt Lake	Waivers
July 31, 2024	(United States) DeJuan Jones	New England Revolution	Columbus Crew	Trade
July 31, 2024	(United States) Will Sands	Columbus Crew	New England Revolution	Trade
August 2, 2024	(Colombia) Tomás Ángel	Los Angeles FC	(United States) Phoenix Rising FC	Loan
August 2, 2024	(Spain) Mario González	Los Angeles FC	(Portugal) Famalicão	Loan
August 2, 2024	(Germany) Jannes Horn	(Germany) 1. FC Nürnberg	St. Louis City SC	Loan
August 2, 2024	(Argentina) Luca Langoni	(Argentina) Boca Juniors	New England Revolution	Transfer
August 3, 2024	(United States) Henry Kessler	New England Revolution	St. Louis City SC	Trade
August 3, 2024	(United States) Tim Parker	St. Louis City SC	New England Revolution	Trade
August 5, 2024	(Slovakia) Matúš Kmeť	(Slovakia) AS Trenčín	Minnesota United FC	Transfer
August 6, 2024	(Argentina) Andrés Herrera	(Argentina) River Plate	Columbus Crew	Loan
August 6, 2024	(United States) CJ Olney	(United States) Philadelphia Union II	Philadelphia Union	Homegrown player
August 7, 2024	(United States) Tim Ream	(England) Fulham	Charlotte FC	Free
August 7, 2024	(Canada) Rida Zouhir	CF Montréal	(United States) Birmingham Legion FC	Loan
August 8, 2024	(Haiti) Shanyder Borgelin	Inter Miami CF	(Denmark) Vendsyssel FF	Transfer
August 8, 2024	(United States) Caden Clark	Minnesota United FC	CF Montréal	Trade
August 8, 2024	(United States) Ilijah Paul	Real Salt Lake	(United States) Ventura County FC	Loan
August 8, 2024	(Haiti) Danley Jean Jacques	(France) Metz	Philadelphia Union	Transfer
August 8, 2024	(Colombia) Édier Ocampo	(Colombia) Atlético Nacional	Vancouver Whitecaps FC	Transfer
August 9, 2024	(Portugal) Diogo Gonçalves	(Denmark) FC Copenhagen	Real Salt Lake	Transfer
August 9, 2024	(Brazil) Talles Magno	New York City FC	(Brazil) Corinthians	Loan
August 9, 2024	(Canada) Jahkeele Marshall-Rutty	Toronto FC	CF Montréal	Trade
August 9, 2024	(Liberia) Patrick Weah	Minnesota United FC	(Denmark) HB Køge	Loan
August 10, 2024	(Senegal) Moussa Djitté	Austin FC	(Turkey) Gençlerbirliği	Free
August 10, 2024	(United States) Joey Akpunonu	FC Cincinnati	(United States) Huntsville City FC	Loan
August 12, 2024	(Brazil) Ruan	CF Montréal	FC Dallas	Trade
August 12, 2024	(Nigeria) Alhassan Yusuf	(Belgium) Royal Antwerp	New England Revolution	Transfer
August 13, 2024	(Spain) Joaquín Fernández	(Turkey) Trabzonspor	Sporting Kansas City	Free
August 14, 2024	(Costa Rica) Ariel Lassiter	CF Montréal	Chicago Fire FC	Trade
August 14, 2024	(Poland) Dominik Marczuk	(Poland) Jagiellonia Białystok	Real Salt Lake	Transfer
August 14, 2024	(Haiti) Nelson Pierre	Philadelphia Union	(United States) Charlotte Independence	Loan
August 14, 2024	(Mexico) Abraham Romero	Los Angeles FC	Columbus Crew	Trade
August 15, 2024	(Cameroon) Aaron Bibout	LA Galaxy	(United States) FC Tulsa	Loan
August 15, 2024	(Spain) Pep Biel	(Greece) Olympiacos	Charlotte FC	Loan
August 15, 2024	(Uruguay) Felipe Carballo	(Brazil) Grêmio	New York Red Bulls	Transfer
August 15, 2024	(United States) Nicholas Gioacchini	(Italy) Como	FC Cincinnati	Loan
August 15, 2024	(United States) Anthony Markanich	St. Louis City SC	Minnesota United FC	Trade
August 15, 2024	(Colombia) Jimmy Medranda	Columbus Crew	(Colombia) Deportivo Cali	Free
August 15, 2024	(Denmark) Sanders Ngabo	Philadelphia Union	(Denmark) AC Horsens	Transfer
August 15, 2024	(Argentina) Joaquín Pereyra	(Argentina) Atlético Tucumán	Minnesota United FC	Transfer
August 15, 2024	(Germany) Marco Reus	(Germany) Borussia Dortmund	LA Galaxy	Free
August 15, 2024	(Japan) Yutaro Tsukada	(United States) Orlando City B	Orlando City SC	Free
August 16, 2024	(Belgium) Brecht Dejaegere	Charlotte FC	(Belgium) KV Kortrijk	Transfer
August 16, 2024	(Switzerland) Xherdan Shaqiri	Chicago Fire FC	(Switzerland) Basel	Free
August 17, 2024	(Colombia) Andrés Gómez	Real Salt Lake	(France) Stade Rennais	Transfer
August 19, 2024	(Canada) Moïse Bombito	Colorado Rapids	(France) Nice	Transfer
August 20, 2024	(Honduras) Exon Arzú	(Honduras) Real España	Houston Dynamo FC	Transfer
August 20, 2024	(Norway) Heine Gikling Bruseth	(Norway) Kristiansund BK	Orlando City SC	Transfer
August 20, 2024	(United States) Ryan Spaulding	New England Revolution	(United States) Tampa Bay Rowdies	Loan
August 21, 2024	(South Africa) Cassius Mailula	Toronto FC	(Morocco) Wydad AC	Loan
August 22, 2024	(England) Jamie Paterson	(England) Swansea City	Charlotte FC	Free
August 23, 2024	(Togo) Loïc Mesanvi	(United States) Minnesota United FC 2	Minnesota United FC	Free
August 23, 2024	(United States) Cole Mrowka	Columbus Crew	(United States) Colorado Springs Switchbacks FC	Loan
August 26, 2024	(Venezuela) José Martínez	Philadelphia Union	(Brazil) Corinthians	Transfer
August 27, 2024	(Canada) Mathieu Choinière	CF Montréal	(Switzerland) Grasshopper Club	Transfer
August 27, 2024	(Zimbabwe) Teenage Hadebe	(Turkey) Konyaspor	FC Cincinnati	Free
August 27, 2024	(Jamaica) Damion Lowe	Philadelphia Union	(Saudi Arabia) Al-Okhdood	Transfer
August 28, 2024	(Portugal) Bento Estrela	New York Red Bulls	(Portugal) Sporting CP	Transfer
August 28, 2024	(Ivory Coast) Georgi Minoungou	(United States) Tacoma Defiance	Seattle Sounders FC	Free
August 30, 2024	(United States) Kristian Fletcher	D.C. United	(England) Nottingham Forest	Loan
August 30, 2024	(England) Alex Mighten	(England) Nottingham Forest	San Diego FC	Transfer
August 31, 2024	(United States) Noel Buck	New England Revolution	(England) Southampton	Loan
August 31, 2024	(England) Alex Mighten	San Diego FC	(Denmark) FC Nordsjaelland	Loan
September 3, 2024	(Scotland) Stuart Armstrong	(England) Southampton	Vancouver Whitecaps FC	Free
September 3, 2024	(South Africa) Njabulo Blom	St. Louis City SC	(South Africa) Kaizer Chiefs	Loan
September 4, 2024	(United States) Kayden Pierre	Sporting Kansas City	(Belgium) Genk	Transfer
September 5, 2024	(Jamaica) Matthew Bell	Real Salt Lake	(United States) FC Tulsa	Loan
September 5, 2024	(Costa Rica) Alejandro Bran	Minnesota United FC	(England) Burton Albion	Loan
September 5, 2024	(France) Bertin Jacquesson	Real Salt Lake	(United States) Pittsburgh Riverhounds SC	Loan
September 9, 2024	(El Salvador) Daniel Ríos	Houston Dynamo FC	(United States) San Antonio FC	Free
September 9, 2024	(Argentina) Óscar Ustari	(Chile) Audax Italiano	Inter Miami CF	Free
September 11, 2024	(United States) Reggie Cannon	(England) Queen's Park Rangers	Colorado Rapids	Free
September 11, 2024	(Brazil) Marlon	(Brazil) Fluminense	Los Angeles FC	Free
September 13, 2024	(Canada) Jeevan Badwal	(Canada) Whitecaps FC 2	Vancouver Whitecaps FC	Homegrown player
September 13, 2024	(United States) Luca Bombino	(United States) Los Angeles FC 2	Los Angeles FC	Homegrown player
September 13, 2024	(Canada) Nathaniel Edwards	(Canada) Toronto FC II	Toronto FC	Free
September 13, 2024	(Canada) Nicolas Fleuriau Chateau	(Canada) Whitecaps FC 2	Vancouver Whitecaps FC	Free
September 13, 2024	(United States) Carlos Mercado	(United States) Orlando City B	Orlando City SC	Free
September 13, 2024	(Venezuela) Júnior Moreno	(Saudi Arabia) Al-Hazem FC	Houston Dynamo FC	Free
September 13, 2024	(Mexico) David Ochoa	(United States) Los Angeles FC 2	Los Angeles FC	Free
September 13, 2024	(United States) Diego Rosales	(United States) Los Angeles FC 2	Los Angeles FC	Free
September 13, 2024	(United States) Charlie Sharp	(Canada) Toronto FC II	Toronto FC	Free
September 13, 2024	(United States) Adrian Wibowo	(United States) Los Angeles FC 2	Los Angeles FC	Homegrown player
