= 2024 D.C. United season =

D.C. United 2024 soccer season

D.C. United
2024 season
- General manager: Ally Mackay
- Head coach: Troy Lesesne
- Stadium: Audi Field
- MLS: Conference: 10th Overall: 20th
- MLS Cup playoffs: Did not qualify
- U.S. Open Cup: Did not qualify
- Leagues Cup: Round of 32
- Top goalscorer: League: Christian Benteke (23); All: Christian Benteke (25)
- Highest home attendance: 19,365 v Inter Miami; March 16 (MLS)
- Lowest home attendance: 1,070 v Santos Laguna; July 31 (Leagues Cup)
- Average home league attendance: 18,137
- Biggest win: 3–0 v Santos Laguna (Home); July 31 (Leagues Cup)
- Biggest defeat: 0–5 v Orlando City (Away); July 6 (MLS)
Home colors	Away colors

The 2024 season was D.C. United's 29th in existence and its 29th consecutive season in the top division of American soccer, Major League Soccer. In addition to MLS, D.C. United participated in the 2024 Leagues Cup.

United finished the season 20th in the league and 10th in Eastern Conference, an improvement from 2023 where they finished 12th in the Eastern Conference, and 23rd overall. However, on the final day of the season, the club lost at home causing them to miss the playoffs for the fifth-consecutive season.

Christian Benteke finished the season with 23 goals in league play and 25 goals in all competitions, allowing him to win the MLS Golden Boot. Benteke became the first United player since Dwayne De Rosario in 2011 to win the Golden Boot.

== Background ==
The 2023 season was the first, and only, full season with Wayne Rooney in charge of managerial duties for United. Under Rooney's leadership the club improved in form and finishing with 40 points on the season, up from 27 the previous season. However, the improvement was not enough to qualify for the 2023 MLS Cup Playoffs, resulting in Rooney's dismissal. Despite calls for his resignation by fans, Sporting Director Dave Kasper was not fired during the offseason.

Outside of league play, United reached the fourth round of the 2023 U.S. Open Cup and the round of 32 in the 2023 Leagues Cup. Christian Benteke lead United with 14 goals across all competitions.

== Club ==
=== Front office ===
Position	Name
Chairman	(United States) Jason Levien
Co-Chairman	(United States) Stephen Kaplan
President	(United States) Danita Johnson
Senior Consultant	(United States) Dave Kasper
Chief Marketing Officer	(United States) Lisa Franklin
Senior Vice President	(United States) James Armold
Chief Financial Officer	(United States) Dan Franceschini
Chief Communications Officer	(United States) Zach Abaie

=== Team management and technical staff ===
Position	Name
General Manager	(Scotland) Ally Mackay
Assistant GM	(United States) Caleb Shreve
Director of Player Personnel	(Haiti) Clarens Cheridieu
Head coach	(United States) Troy Lesesne
Assistant coach	(Uruguay) Alex Martínez
Assistant coach	(United States) Zach Prince
Goalkeeping coach	(United States) Cody Mizell

=== First-team roster ===
Squad No.	Name	Nationality	Position(s)	Date of birth (age)	Apps	Goals	Assists	Signed from
Goalkeepers
1	Tyler Miller	(United States)	GK	March 12, 1993 (age 33)	47	0	0	(United States) Minnesota United FC
24	Alex Bono	(United States)	GK	April 25, 1994 (age 32)	30	0	0	(Canada) Toronto FC
26	Nathan Crockford	(United States)	GK	September 6, 2002 (age 24)	0	0	0	(United States) Wisconsin Badgers
56	Luis Zamudio	(United States)	GK	June 24, 1998 (age 28)	0	0	0	(United States) Loudoun United
Defenders
3	Lucas Bartlett	(United States)	CB	July 26, 1997 (age 29)	35	2	3	(United States) St. Louis City SC
4	Matti Peltola	(Finland)	CB / DM	July 3, 2002 (age 24)	34	0	0	(Finland) HJK Helsinki
12	Conner Antley	(United States)	RB / CB	March 22, 1995 (age 31)	7	0	1	(United States) Tampa Bay Rowdies
16	Garrison Tubbs	(United States)	CB	February 17, 2002 (age 24)	16	0	1	(United States) Atlanta United FC
22	Aaron Herrera	(Guatemala)	RB	June 6, 1997 (age 29)	33	1	5	(Canada) CF Montréal
28	David Schnegg	(Austria)	LB	September 29, 1998 (age 27)	5	1	0	(Austria) Sturm Graz
30	Hayden Sargis	(United States)	CB	May 2, 2002 (age 24)	7	0	0	(United States) Sacramento Republic
45	Matai Akinmboni	(United States)	CB	October 17, 2006 (age 19)	17	0	1	(United States) D.C. United Academy
97	Christopher McVey	(Sweden)	CB	April 12, 1997 (age 29)	28	1	0	(United States) Inter Miami FC
Midfielders
5	Boris Enow	(Cameroon)	CM	March 30, 2000 (age 26)	8	0	0	(Israel) Maccabi Netanya
6	Russell Canouse	(United States)	DM	June 11, 1995 (age 31)	142	5	6	(Germany) Hoffenheim
7	Pedro Santos	(Portugal)	LM / RW	April 22, 1988 (age 38)	54	4	4	(United States) Columbus Crew
8	Jared Stroud	(United States)	LW / RW	July 10, 1996 (age 30)	36	5	9	(United States) St. Louis City SC
10	Gabriel Pirani	(Brazil)	AM	April 12, 2002 (age 24)	46	7	1	(Brazil) Santos FC
14	Martín Rodríguez	(Chile)	MF / LW	August 5, 1994 (age 32)	41	2	4	(Turkey) Altay SK
18	Jeremy Garay	(El Salvador)	MF	April 1, 2003 (age 23)	3	0	0	(United States) D.C. United Academy
21	Ted Ku-DiPietro	(United States)	AM / SS	January 28, 2002 (age 24)	70	8	8	(United States) Loudoun United
25	Jackson Hopkins	(United States)	AM / SS	July 1, 2004 (age 22)	53	0	1	(United States) D.C. United Academy
43	Mateusz Klich	(Poland)	CM	June 30, 1990 (age 36)	70	7	13	(England) Leeds United
Forwards
11	Cristian Dájome	(Colombia)	LW	January 3, 1994 (age 32)	57	6	3	(Canada) Vancouver Whitecaps FC
17	Jacob Murrell	(United States)	FW	March 29, 2004 (age 22)	30	1	2	(United States) Georgetown Hoyas
20	Christian Benteke	(Belgium)	ST	December 3, 1990 (age 35)	74	40	8	(England) Crystal Palace
23	Dominique Badji	(Senegal)	CF	October 16, 1992 (age 33)	11	1	1	(Turkey) Bandirmaspor
27	Kristian Fletcher	(United States)	FW	October 16, 2004 (age 21)	28	2	1	(United States) Loudoun United

== Non-competitive ==
=== Friendlies ===
January 30	Sudan	0–6	D.C. United	Jeddah, Saudi Arabia
11:00 AM EST		Report	Parrish 10'; Herrera 26'; Dájome 31', 44'; Fletcher 59'; Murrell 72'	Stadium: King Abdullah Sports City; Attendance: 0

February 3	Al Wehda	1–1	D.C. United	Jeddah, Saudi Arabia
11:00 AM EST	Ighalo 40'	Report	Santos 86'	Stadium: King Abdullah Sports City; Attendance: 0

February 12	Al-Hilal	3–1	D.C. United	Jeddah, Saudi Arabia
11:00 AM EST	Muzmel 15'; Diaw 35'; Ifasso 81'	Report	Hopkins 27'	Stadium: King Abdullah Sports City; Attendance: 0

February 9	Al-Ettifaq	2–0	D.C. United	Dammam, Saudi Arabia
9:45 AM EST	Medrán 51'; Dembélé 79'			Stadium: Prince Mohamed bin Fahd Stadium; Attendance: 0

February 17	FC Dallas	2–0	D.C. United	Frisco, Texas
2:10 PM EST	Illarramendi 31'; Ferreira 65'	Report		Stadium: Toyota Stadium; Attendance: 14,834

July 20	D.C. United	0–4	Celtic	Washington, D.C.
7:30 PM EDT			O'Riley 24', 31'; Johnston 64'; Forrest 68'	Stadium: Audi Field; Attendance: 18,590

October 12	D.C. United	v	Asante Kotoko	Washington, D.C.
				Stadium: Audi Field

== Competitive ==
=== Major League Soccer ===
==== Standings ====
===== Eastern Conference =====
MLS Eastern Conference table (2024)
Pos	Team	Pld	W	L	T	GF	GA	GD	Pts	Qualification
8	CF Montréal	34	11	13	10	48	64	−16	43	Qualification for the wild-card round and the 2025 Leagues Cup
9	Atlanta United FC	34	10	14	10	46	49	−3	40	Qualification for the wild-card round and the 2025 Leagues Cup
10	D.C. United	34	10	14	10	52	70	−18	40	
11	Toronto FC	34	11	19	4	40	61	−21	37	
12	Philadelphia Union	34	9	15	10	62	55	+7	37	

Source: MLS
Rules for classification: 1) points; 2) total wins; 3) total goal differential; 4) total goals scored; 5) fewer disciplinary points; 6) away goal differential; 7) away goals scored; 8) home goals differential; 9) home goals scored; 10) coin toss (2 clubs tied) or drawing of lots (≥3 clubs tied)

===== Overall table =====
Overall MLS standings table
Pos	Team	Pld	W	L	T	GF	GA	GD	Pts	Qualification
19	FC Dallas	34	11	15	8	54	56	−2	41	Qualification for the U.S. Open Cup Round of 32 (Note: As one of the U.S. teams who did not qualify for the 2025 CONCACAF Champions Cup or the 2025 Leagues Cup)
20	Atlanta United FC	34	10	14	10	46	49	−3	40	
21	D.C. United	34	10	14	10	52	70	−18	40	Qualification for the U.S. Open Cup Round of 32
22	Toronto FC	34	11	19	4	40	61	−21	37	
23	Philadelphia Union	34	9	15	10	62	55	+7	37	Qualification for the U.S. Open Cup Round of 32

Source: MLS
Rules for classification: 1) points; 2) total wins; 3) total goal differential; 4) total goals scored; 5) fewer disciplinary points; 6) away goal differential; 7) away goals scored; 8) home goals differential; 9) home goals scored; 10) coin toss (2 clubs tied) or drawing of lots (≥3 clubs tied)

==== Results summary ====
Overall								Home						Away					
Pld	W	D	L	GF	GA	GD	Pts	W	D	L	GF	GA	GD	W	D	L	GF	GA	GD
34	10	10	14	52	70	−18	40	4	5	8	26	36	−10	6	5	6	26	34	−8

Last updated: October 19, 2024.
Source: MLS

==== Match results ====
February 24 1	D.C. United	3–1	New England Revolution	Washington, D.C.
7:30 PM EST	Benteke 34', 72', 90+3'; Santos (yellow card) 49'; Stroud (yellow card) 54'; Fletcher (yellow card) 77'	Report	Vrioni (yellow card) 12' (yellow-red card) 25'; Carles Gil (yellow card) 39', (goal) 67'; Harkes (yellow card) 70'	Stadium: Audi Field; Attendance: 19,215; Referee: Andrew Musashe

March 2 2	Portland Timbers	2–2	D.C. United	Portland, Oregon
10:30 PM EST	Chará (yellow card) 7'; Asprilla 18'; Crépeau (yellow card) 59'; Moreno 61'; McGraw (yellow card) 68'	Report	Klich (yellow card) 62', (goal) 72' (pen.); Fletcher 82'; Herrera (yellow card) 90+1'	Stadium: Providence Park; Attendance: 20,221; Referee: Trevor Wiseman

March 10 3	FC Cincinnati	0–0	D.C. United	Cincinnati, Ohio
3:00 PM EDT	Acosta (yellow card) 55'	Report	Herrera (yellow card) 43'; Stroud (yellow card) 51'; Klich (yellow card) 56'; Santos (yellow card) 72'	Stadium: TQL Stadium; Attendance: 25,513; Referee: Cristian Campo Hernandez

March 16 4	D.C. United	1–3	Inter Miami CF	Washington, D.C.
2:00 PM EDT	Stroud 14'; McVey (yellow card) 21'; Pirani (yellow card) 27'; Herrera (yellow card) 34'; Peltola (yellow card) 68'; Klich (yellow card) 74'; Santos (red card) 82'	Report	Campana 24'; Avilés (yellow card) 28'; Busquets (yellow card) 55'; Suárez 72', 85'; Gómez (yellow card) 79'	Stadium: Audi Field; Attendance: 19,365; Referee: Lorenzo Hernandez

March 23 5	St. Louis City SC	2–2	D.C. United	St. Louis, Missouri
8:30 PM EDT	Yaro 19'; Nilsson (yellow card) 43'; Klauss 70'; Durkin (yellow card) 73'; Blom (yellow card) 90+12'; Alm (yellow card) 90+14'	Report	Ku-DiPietro 21', (yellow card) 82'; Hopkins (yellow card) 24'; Benteke 38'; Pirani (yellow card) 88'; Murrell (yellow card) 90+13'	Stadium: CityPark; Attendance: 22,423; Referee: Amin Hadzic

March 30 6	D.C. United	1–0	CF Montréal	Washington, D.C.
7:30 PM EDT	Dájome (yellow card) 52'; Klich (yellow card) 58'; Santos 85'	Report	Iankov (yellow card) 44'; Waterman (yellow card) 57'; Martínez (yellow card) 81'	Stadium: Audi Field; Attendance: 18,402; Referee: Ramy Touchan

April 6 7	Columbus Crew	1–1	D.C. United	Columbus, Ohio
7:30 PM EDT	Rossi (yellow card) 44'; Hernández (red card) 75'; Morris 87'	Report	Benteke 61', (yellow card) 90+4'; Herrera (yellow card) 79'	Stadium: Lower.com Field; Attendance: 20,740; Referee: Pierre-Luc Lauziere

April 13 8	D.C. United	2–3	Orlando City SC	Washington, D.C.
7:30 PM EDT	Benteke 5', (yellow card) 88'; Herrera (yellow card) 42'; Antley (yellow card) 45'; Dájome (yellow card) 45+2'; Hopkins (yellow card) 45+4'; Klich (yellow card) 49'; Pirani 66'	Report	Thórhallsson 28', (yellow card) 55'; Cartagena (yellow card) 42'; Brekalo (yellow card) 55', (goal) 82'; McGuire 90+1'	Stadium: Audi Field; Attendance: 18,615; Referee: Guido Gonzales, Jr.

April 20 9	New York City FC	2–0	D.C. United	New York, New York
7:30 PM EDT	Rodríguez 20'; Bakrar (yellow card) 63'; Fernández 90+1'	Report	Akinmboni (yellow card) 34'; Bartlett (yellow card) 50'	Stadium: Citi Field; Attendance: 21,073; Referee: Malik Badawi

April 27 10	D.C. United	2–1	Seattle Sounders FC	Washington, D.C.
7:30 PM EDT	McVey (yellow card) 5'; Benteke 32' (pen.), 44'; Bartlett (yellow card) 38'; Stroud (yellow card) 42'; Hopkins (yellow card) 67'; Rodríguez (yellow card) 82'	Report	Chú 14'; Frei (red card) 28'; Morris (yellow card) 41'	Stadium: Audi Field; Attendance: 18,223; Referee: Rosendo Mendoza

May 4 11	D.C. United	2–2	Philadelphia Union	Washington, D.C.
7:30 PM EDT	Dájome 9'; Murrell 33'; Ku-DiPietro (yellow card) 90+2'	Report	Carranza (yellow card) 20'; Bedoya 42'; Flach (yellow card) 45+2'; Lowe (yellow card) 45+2'; McGlynn 79'	Stadium: Audi Field; Attendance: 17,237; Referee: Ismir Pekmic

May 11 12	Atlanta United FC	2–3	D.C. United	Atlanta, Georgia
7:30 PM EDT	Almada 16', (yellow card) 45+2'; Slisz (yellow card) 30'; Peltola 48' (o.g.); Giakoumakis (yellow card) 70'; Abram (yellow card) 75'	Report	Benteke 19', 44', 55'; Dájome (yellow card) 38'; Antley (yellow card) 84'	Stadium: Mercedes-Benz Stadium; Attendance: 42,822; Referee: Joe Dickerson

May 15 13	D.C. United	1–4	New York Red Bulls	Washington, D.C.
7:30 PM EDT	Bartlett 65'	Report	Manoel 45+2'; Harper 52'; Morgan 57'; Burke 90+3'	Stadium: Audi Field; Attendance: 17,417; Referee: Rubiel Vazquez

May 18 14	Inter Miami CF	1–0	D.C. United	Fort Lauderdale, Florida
7:30 PM EDT	Rojas (yellow card) 30'; Campana 90+4', (yellow card) 90+4'	Report	Birnbaum (yellow card) 20'; Benteke (yellow card) 26'; McVey (yellow card) 48'; Klich (yellow card) 90+6'	Stadium: Chase Stadium; Attendance: 21,318; Referee: Guido Gonzales, Jr.

May 25 15	D.C. United	1–1	Chicago Fire FC	Washington, D.C.
7:30 PM EDT	McVey 20'; Dájome (yellow card) 42'; Benteke (yellow card) 46'; Birnbaum (yellow card) 83'	Report	Arigoni (yellow card) 36'; Terán (yellow card) 45'; Acosta 53'	Stadium: Audi Field; Attendance: 19,081; Referee: Mark Allatin

May 29 16	CF Montréal	4–2	D.C. United	Montreal, Quebec
7:30 PM EDT	Lassiter 6'; Ibrahim 34', 73'; Choinière 38', (yellow card) 58'	Report	Benteke 29', 42'; Peltola (yellow card) 37' (yellow-red card) 45+5'; Dájome (yellow card) 63'	Stadium: Saputo Stadium; Referee: Ismail Elfath

June 1 17	D.C. United	2–2	Toronto FC	Washington, D.C.
7:30 PM EDT	Ku-DiPietro 79'; Klich 90+5'	Report	Etienne Jr. 2'; Bernardeschi (yellow card) 52' (yellow-red card) 87', (goal) 33'; Gomis (yellow card) 80' (yellow-red card) 90+3'; Flores (yellow card) 82'; Osorio (yellow card) 90+4'; Marshall Rutty (yellow card) 90+4'; Longstaff (yellow card) 90+8'; Petretta (yellow card) 90+12'	Stadium: Audi Field; Attendance: 19,215; Referee: Jon Freemon

June 15 18	Charlotte FC	1–0	D.C. United	Charlotte, North Carolina
7:30 PM EDT	Privett (yellow card) 45+6'; Vargas 45+7'; Kahlina (yellow card) 88'; Byrne (yellow card) 90+6'	Report	Benteke (yellow card) 72'; Dájome (yellow card) 75'	Stadium: Bank of America Stadium; Attendance: 30,468; Referee: Sergii Boiko

June 19 19	D.C. United	0–1	Atlanta United FC	Washington, D.C.
7:30 PM EDT	Tubbs (yellow card) 34'; Klich (yellow card) 45+1'	Report	Almada (yellow card) 18', (goal) 79' Cobb (yellow card) 63'	Stadium: Audi Field; Attendance: 15,899; Referee: Pierre-Luc Lauziere

June 22 20	D.C. United	1–4	Houston Dynamo FC	Washington, D.C.
7:30 PM EDT	Murrell (yellow card) 25'; Benteke 38', (yellow card) 66' (red card) 66'; Akinmboni (yellow card) 50' (yellow-red card) 90+4'; Dájome (yellow card) 73'; Bartlett (yellow card) 79'	Report	Ferreira 51', 54', 86'; Segal 90+5'; Steres (yellow card) 90+9'	Stadium: Audi Field; Attendance: 17,993; Referee: Timothy Ford

June 29 21	New York Red Bulls	2–2	D.C. United	Harrison, New Jersey
7:30 PM EDT	Manoel 24'; Donkor (yellow card) 28'; Burke (yellow card) 70'; Harper 78'	Report	Stroud 6'; Dájome (yellow card) 14' (yellow-red card) 20'; Santos (yellow card) 23', (goal) 45+4'; Rodríguez (yellow card) 52'; Herrera (yellow card) 83'; Miller (yellow card) 90+2'	Stadium: Red Bull Arena; Attendance: 18,315; Referee: Malik Badawi

July 3 22	D.C. United	2–3	FC Cincinnati	Washington, D.C.
7:30 PM EDT	Santos (yellow card) 14'; Rodríguez 24'; Pirani 69'	Report	Kelsy 10', (yellow card) 51'; Bucha 39', 63'; Kubo (yellow card) 82'	Stadium: Audi Field; Attendance: 16,716; Referee: Alexis Da Silva

July 6 23	Orlando City SC	5–0	D.C. United	Orlando, Florida
7:30 PM EDT	Ojeda 19'; Jansson 23'; Angulo 42'; Torres 74'; Enrique 85'	Report	Bartlett (red card) 45+2'; Sargis (yellow card) 64'	Stadium: Inter&Co Stadium; Attendance: 22,561; Referee: Lukasz Szpala

July 13 24	D.C. United	2–1	Nashville SC	Washington, D.C.
7:30 PM EDT	Dájome 51', 55'; Peltola (yellow card) 84'	Report	Boyd 19'; Surridge (yellow card) 73'	Stadium: Audi Field; Referee: Filip Dujic

July 17 25	Minnesota United FC	2–3	D.C. United	Saint Paul, Minnesota
8:30 PM EDT	Oluwaseyi 32'; Boxall (yellow card) 49'; Pukki 80'	Report	Benteke 14', 91'; Rodriguez (yellow card) 86'; Herrera 90'	Stadium: Allianz Field; Attendance: 19,742; Referee: Mark Alattin

August 24 26	D.C. United	3–4	FC Dallas	Washington, D.C.
7:30 PM EDT	Benteke 2' (yellow card) 90+1'; Klich (yellow card) 25'; Enow (yellow card) 34' (yellow-red card) 45+2'; Schnegg 42' (yellow card) 90+3'; Stroud (yellow card) 43' (goal) 48'; Herrera (yellow card) 66'; Rodríguez (yellow card) 80'	Report	Tafari 9'; Lletget 21'; Arriola 40' (yellow card) 54'; Ntsabeleng 44'; Farfan (yellow card) 46'; Illarramendi (yellow card) 83'	Stadium: Audi Field; Attendance: 17,766; Referee: Sergii Boiko

August 31 27	Toronto FC	1–3	D.C. United	Toronto, Ontario
7:30 PM EDT	Flores (yellow card) 65'; Kerr (yellow card) 77', (goal) 83'; Laryea (yellow card) 90+1'	Report	Rodríguez 67'; Badji 88'; Pirani (yellow card) 90+1', (goal) 90+3'	Stadium: BMO Field; Attendance: 28,489; Referee: Marcos DeOliveira

September 7 28	Chicago Fire FC	1–2	D.C. United	Bridgeview, Illinois
8:30 PM EDT	Gutman (yellow card) 45+1', (goal) 54'	Report	Benteke 26'; Pirani 29'; Badji (yellow card) 73'; Klich (yellow card) 90'	Stadium: SeatGeek Stadium; Attendance: 16,426; Referee: Fotis Bazakos

September 14 29	D.C. United	1–1	New York City FC	Washington, D.C.
7:30 PM EDT	Benteke (yellow card) 16', (goal) 67' (pen.); Bartlett (yellow card) 27'; Santos (yellow card) 55'; Badji (yellow card) 80'	Report	Rodríguez 32'; Sands (yellow card) 41'; Moralez (yellow card) 69'; Thiago (yellow card) 82'	Stadium: Audi Field; Attendance: 19,215; Referee: Ramy Touchan

September 22 30	Philadelphia Union	4–0	D.C. United	Chester, Pennsylvania
6:00 PM EDT	Uhre 13'; Gazdag 16', 69'; Baribo 51'	Report	Herrera (yellow card) 25'; Dájome (yellow card) 90+2'	Stadium: Subaru Park; Attendance: 18,823; Referee: Filip Dujic

September 28 31	D.C. United	2–2	Columbus Crew	Washington, D.C.
7:30 PM EDT	Benteke 30', 81'; Klich (yellow card) 47'	Report	Cheberko (yellow card) 47'; Hernández 54', (yellow card) 89'; Russell-Rowe 57'; Rossi (yellow card) 77'	Stadium: Audi Field; Attendance: 17,806; Referee: Rubiel Vazquez

October 2 32	Nashville SC	3–4	D.C. United	Nashville, Tennessee
8:30 PM EDT	Muyl 6', 62'; Mukhtar 45'; Zimmerman (yellow card) 74'; Bunbury (yellow card) 83'; Lovitz (yellow card) 90+2'	Report	Bartlett 24', (yellow card) 43'; McVey (yellow card) 38'; Herrera (yellow card) 41'; Benteke 76'; Pirani 90+4', 90+7'	Stadium: Geodis Park; Attendance: 28,863; Referee: Lukasz Szpala

October 5 33	New England Revolution	1–2	D.C. United	Foxborough, Massachusetts
7:30 PM EDT	Langoni (yellow card) 54'; Peltola 74' (o.g.); N. Gil (yellow card) 75'	Report	Santos (yellow card) 72'; Benteke 8'; Bartlett 75'	Stadium: Gillette Stadium; Attendance: 44,110; Referee: Alexis da Silva

October 19 34	D.C. United	0–3	Charlotte FC	Washington, D.C.
6:00 PM EDT	Rodríguez (yellow card) 10'	Report	Biel 58'; Agyemang 75'; Kahlina (yellow card) 79'; Abada 90+1'	Stadium: Audi Field; Referee: Jair Marrufo

=== U.S. Open Cup ===
The top eight teams that did not already qualify for the 2024 CONCACAF Champions Cup, excluding the defending Open Cup champion, qualified for the 2024 U.S. Open Cup. D.C. United did not finish in one of the positions to qualify for the tournament.

=== Leagues Cup ===
==== Group stage ====
Pos	Team	Pld	W	PW	PL	L	GF	GA	GD	Pts	Qualification	DCU	SAN	ATL
1	(United States Soccer Federation) D.C. United	2	1	1	0	0	6	3	+3	5	Advance to knockout stage	—	—	—
2	(Mexican Football Federation) Santos Laguna	2	0	1	0	1	0	3	−3	2	Advance to knockout stage	0–3	—	—
3	(United States Soccer Federation) Atlanta United FC	2	0	0	2	0	3	3	0	2		3–3	0–0	—

Source: Leagues Cup
Rules for classification: Tiebreakers

July 26 Group stage	Atlanta United (United States)	3–3 (5–6 p)	(United States) D.C. United	Atlanta, Georgia
8:00 PM EDT	Ríos 20', 81' (pen.); Lobzhanidze 38'	Report	Benteke 4'; Stroud 25', 32'; McVey (yellow card) 56'; Santos (yellow card) 86'	Stadium: Mercedes-Benz Stadium; Attendance: 14,428; Referee: Fernando Guerrero
	Penalties
	McCarty (penalty scored); Lennon (penalty missed); Firmino (penalty scored); Lobzhanidze (penalty scored); Thiaré (penalty scored); Williams (penalty scored); Slisz (penalty missed)		(penalty missed) Klich; (penalty scored) Benteke; (penalty scored) Herrera; (penalty scored) Dájome; (penalty scored) Santos; (penalty scored) McVey; (penalty scored) Pirani

July 31 Group stage	Santos Laguna (Mexico)	0–3	(United States) D.C. United	Chester, Pennsylvania (Note: On July 26, 2024, D.C. United announced that their match against Santos Laguna would be moved to Subaru Park in Chester, Pennsylvania, due to extensive field damage at their home stadium, Audi Field.)
8:00 PM EDT	Fagúndez (yellow card) 50'	Report	Schnegg (yellow card) 3'; Benteke 28'; Ku-DiPietro 48'; Dájome 58'	Stadium: Subaru Park; Attendance: 1,070; Referee: Natalie Simon

==== Knockout stage ====
August 9 Round of 32	D.C. United (United States)	1–2	(Mexico) Mazatlán	Washington, D.C.
	Benteke (yellow card) 7'; Stroud (red card) 27'; Klich 74'; Schnegg (yellow card) 78'	Report	Colula (yellow card) 2'; Bárcenas 34'; Meraz (yellow card) 39'; Rubio 43'; Árciga (yellow card) 71'; Esquivel (yellow card) 76'	Stadium: Audi Field; Attendance: 8,808; Referee: Selvin Brown (Honduras)

== Transfers ==
=== Transfers in ===
==== Winter ====
Date	Position	No.	Name	From	Fee/notes	Ref.
December 11, 2023	MF	8	(United States) Jared Stroud	(United States) St. Louis City	Trade for Chris Durkin	
December 11, 2023	DF	3	(United States) Lucas Bartlett	(United States) St. Louis City	Trade for Chris Durkin	
December 12, 2023	DF	22	(Guatemala) Aaron Herrera	(Canada) CF Montréal	Trade for Ruan, $500,000 GAM	
December 19, 2023	DF	16	(United States) Garrison Tubbs	(United States) Atlanta United	$125K GAM, up to $150K extra for certain conditions	
January 5, 2024	FW	17	(United States) Jacob Murrell	(United States) Georgetown Hoyas	2024 MLS SuperDraft pick Signed through 2026 with 2027 team option.	
January 16, 2024	GK	26	(United States) Nathan Crockford	(United States) Wisconsin Badgers	2024 MLS SuperDraft pick Signed through 2024 with 2025-27 team options.	
February 1, 2024	DF	97	(Sweden) Christopher McVey	(United States) Inter Miami	2024 International slot, up to $100K GAM to Miami	
February 2, 2024	DF	4	(Finland) Matti Peltola	(Finland) HJK Helsinki	Free Transfer	
February 14, 2024	DF	12	(United States) Conner Antley	(United States) Tampa Bay Rowdies	Signed through 2025, with 2026 team option	

==== Summer ====
===== First team =====
Date	Position	No.	Name	From	Fee/notes	Ref.
July 18, 2024	DF	28	(Austria) David Schnegg	(Austria) Sturm Graz		
July 18, 2024	FW	23	(Senegal) Dominique Badji	(Turkey) Bandırmaspor		
July 22, 2024	MF	5	(Cameroon) Boris Enow	(Israel) Maccabi Netanya		

===== Academy =====
Date	Position	Name	From	Fee/notes	Ref.
July 1, 2024	FW	(Lithuania) Gabrielius Mažonas	(Lithuania) Žalgiris	Undisclosed	

=== Transfers out ===
==== First team ====
===== Winter =====
Date	Position	No.	Name	To	Fee/notes	Ref.
December 1, 2023	MF	49	(Jamaica) Ravel Morrison	(United Arab Emirates) Precision	Out of Contract	
December 1, 2023	DF	3	(Republic of Ireland) Derrick Williams	(United States) Atlanta United	Out of Contract	
December 1, 2023	DF	23	(United States) Donovan Pines	(England) Barnsley	Option Declined	
December 1, 2023	DF	4	(United States) Brendan Hines-Ike	(United States) Austin FC	Option Declined	
December 1, 2023	DF	14	(Honduras) Andy Najar	(Honduras) Olimpia	Option Declined	
December 1, 2023	DF	31	(Panama) Eric Davis	(Slovakia) Košice	Option Declined	
December 1, 2023	DF	33	(United States) Jacob Greene	(United States) Columbus Crew 2	Option Declined	
December 1, 2023	DF	72	(Ivory Coast) Gaoussou Samaké	(United States) Las Vegas Lights	Option Declined	
December 1, 2023	MF	22	(Argentina) Yamil Asad	(United States) FC Cincinnati	Option Declined	
December 1, 2023	FW	9	(United States) Erik Hurtado	Retired	Option Declined	
December 1, 2023	FW	19	(Netherlands) Nigel Robertha	(United Arab Emirates) Ittihad Kalba	Option Declined	
December 1, 2023	FW	84	(Panama) José Fajardo	(Panama) Independiente	Option Declined	
December 11, 2023	MF	8	(United States) Chris Durkin	(United States) St. Louis City	Trade, $300,000 GAM	
December 12, 2023	DF	2	(Brazil) Ruan	(Canada) CF Montréal	Trade	

===== Summer =====
Date	Position	No.	Name	To	Fee/notes	Ref.
June 3, 2024	DF	5	(Iraq) Mohanad Jeahze	(Norway) Lillestrøm	Contract Buyout	
July 16, 2024	DF	15	(United States) Steve Birnbaum	Retired		

==== Academy ====
===== Winter =====
Date	Position	Name	To	Fee/notes	Ref.
November 28, 2023	FW	(United States) Adrian Buri	(United States) Old Dominion Monarchs	Signed NLI	
March 6, 2024	DF	(United States) Ramsey Ray	(United States) College of Charleston Cougars	Signed NLI	

===== Summer =====
Date	Position	Name	To	Fee/notes	Ref.
April 11, 2024	FW	(United States) Sydney Aggrey	(United States) Canisius Golden Griffins	Signed NLI	
June 28, 2024	MF	(United States) James Snaith	(United States) Brown Bears	Signed NLI	
July 1, 2024	MF	(Puerto Rico) Edwin Rios	(United States) LA Galaxy	Free	
July 3, 2024	MF	(Honduras) Alessandro Maldonado	(Croatia) Istra 1961	Free	
July 15, 2024	MF	(Peru) Gabriel Cossio	(United States) MC Raptors	Signed NLI	
August 1, 2024	DF	(United States) Dash Papez	(United States) Princeton Tigers	Signed NLI	
August 1, 2024	DF	(United States) Justin Melly	(United States) Cornell Big Red	Signed NLI	
September 1, 2024	DF	(Brazil) Henrique Borges	(United States) Word of Life Huskies	Signed NLI	

=== Loan out ===
==== First team ====
No.	Pos.	Player	Loaned to	Start	End	Source
26	FW	(United States) Kristian Fletcher	(Wales) Swansea City	September 1, 2023	February 1, 2024	
30	DF	(United States) Hayden Sargis	(United States) Las Vegas Lights	March 5, 2024; March 26, 2024	March 22, 2024; June 26, 2024	
18	MF	(El Salvador) Jeremy Garay	(United States) El Paso Locomotive	March 13, 2024	June 27, 2024	
56	GK	(United States) Luis Zamudio	(United States) Colorado Springs Switchbacks	May 2, 2024	July 10, 2024	
45	DF	(United States) Matai Akinmboni	(United States) Loudoun United	May 14, 2024	June 1, 2024	
27	FW	(United States) Kristian Fletcher	(England) Nottingham Forest	August 30, 2024	June 30, 2025	

==== Academy ====
Date	Pos.	Player	To	Date until	Ref.
August 1, 2024	DF	(United States) Dash Papez	(United States) Princeton Tigers	May 30, 2025	
August 1, 2024	DF	(United States) Justin Melly	(United States) Cornell Big Red	May 30, 2025	
August 1, 2024	MF	(Peru) Gabriel Cossio	(United States) MC Raptors	May 30, 2025	
August 1, 2024	MF	(United States) James Snaith	(United States) Brown Bears	May 30, 2025	

=== MLS SuperDraft picks ===
2024 D.C. United SuperDraft Picks
Round	Selection	Player	Position	College	Status
1	7	(United States) Jacob Murrell	FW	Georgetown	Signed with First Team
2	36	(United States) Brandon Parrish	MF	Clemson	Signed with Crown Legacy FC
2	49	(United States) Aldair Sanchez	DF	North Carolina (Note: Sanchez is currently under contract with the Sacramento Republic, but if he is signed to an MLS contract, DC United retains right of first refusal, and the MLS franchise signing him must pay adequate compensation to Sacramento.)	Stayed with Sacramento Republic
3	65	(United States) Nathan Crockford	GK	Wisconsin	Signed with First Team

== Statistics ==
=== Appearances and goals ===
Numbers after plus-sign(+) denote appearances as a substitute.

No.	Pos	Nat	Player	Total		MLS		Leagues Cup	
No.	Pos	Nat	Player	Apps	Goals	Apps	Goals	Apps	Goals
1	GK	(United States) USA	Tyler Miller	5	0	5+0	0	0+0	0
3	DF	(United States) USA	Lucas Bartlett	26	1	23+1	1	2+0	0
4	MF	(Finland) FIN	Matti Peltola	25	0	19+4	0	2+0	0
5	MF	(Cameroon) CMR	Boris Enow	0	0	0+0	0	0+0	0
6	MF	(United States) USA	Russell Canouse	0	0	0+0	0	0+0	0
7	MF	(Portugal) POR	Pedro Santos	22	2	14+7	2	0+1	0
8	MF	(United States) USA	Jared Stroud	26	4	23+1	2	2+0	2
10	MF	(Brazil) BRA	Gabriel Pirani	26	2	8+16	2	0+2	0
11	FW	(Colombia) COL	Cristian Dájome	24	4	19+3	3	2+0	1
12	DF	(United States) USA	Conner Antley	7	0	4+3	0	0+0	0
14	FW	(Chile) CHI	Martín Rodríguez	16	1	6+10	1	0+0	0
16	DF	(United States) USA	Garrison Tubbs	12	0	5+6	0	0+1	0
17	FW	(United States) USA	Jacob Murrell	22	1	6+14	1	0+2	0
18	MF	(El Salvador) ESA	Jeremy Garay	2	0	0+2	0	0+0	0
20	FW	(Belgium) BEL	Christian Benteke	23	18	21+0	16	2+0	2
21	MF	(United States) USA	Ted Ku-DiPietro	21	3	18+2	2	1+0	1
22	DF	(Guatemala) GUA	Aaron Herrera	24	1	22+0	1	2+0	0
23	FW	(Senegal) SEN	Dominique Badji	1	0	0+0	0	1+0	0
24	GK	(United States) USA	Alex Bono	22	0	20+0	0	2+0	0
25	MF	(United States) USA	Jackson Hopkins	19	0	12+5	0	0+2	0
26	GK	(United States) USA	Nathan Crockford	0	0	0+0	0	0+0	0
27	FW	(United States) USA	Kristian Fletcher	13	1	1+12	1	0+0	0
28	FW	(Austria) AUT	David Schnegg	2	0	0+0	0	2+0	0
30	DF	(United States) USA	Hayden Sargis	1	0	0+1	0	0+0	0
43	MF	(Poland) POL	Mateusz Klich	25	2	23+0	2	2+0	0
45	DF	(Liberia) LBR	Matai Akinmboni	8	0	3+4	0	1+0	0
56	GK	(United States) USA	Luis Zamudio	0	0	0+0	0	0+0	0
97	DF	(Sweden) SWE	Christopher McVey	21	1	19+1	1	1+0	0
Players who left during the season
5	DF	(Iraq) IRQ	Mohanad Jeahze	1	0	0+1	0	0+0	0
15	DF	(United States) USA	Steve Birnbaum	6	0	4+2	0	0+0	0

=== Top scorers ===
Rank	Position	No.	Name	MLS	Leagues Cup	Total
1	FW	20	(Belgium) Christian Benteke	16	2	18
2	FW	11	(Colombia) Cristian Dájome	3	1	4
2	MF	8	(United States) Jared Stroud	2	2	4
4	MF	21	(United States) Ted Ku-DiPietro	2	1	3
5	MF	7	(Portugal) Pedro Santos	2	0	2
5	MF	10	(Brazil) Gabriel Pirani	2	0	2
5	MF	43	(Poland) Mateusz Klich	2	0	2
8	6 players with 1 goal					
Total				35	6	41

- Last updated: August 4, 2024
- Source: Team Stats

=== Top assists ===
Rank	Position	No.	Name	MLS	Leagues Cup	Total
1	MF	43	(Poland) Mateusz Klich	8	1	9
1	MF	8	(United States) Jared Stroud	8	1	9
3	MF	22	(Guatemala) Aaron Herrera	6	1	7
4	FW	20	(Belgium) Christian Benteke	4	0	4
5	FW	14	(Chile) Martín Rodríguez	3	0	3
5	MF	7	(Portugal) Pedro Santos	3	0	3
7	DF	3	(United States) Lucas Bartlett	2	0	2
8	8 players with 1 assist					
Total				41	4	45

- Last updated: August 4, 2024
- Source: Team Stats

=== Hat-tricks ===
Player	Against	Result	Date	Competition	Ref.
(Belgium) Christian Benteke	New England Revolution (H)	3–1	February 24	MLS	
(Belgium) Christian Benteke	Atlanta United (A)	3–2	May 11	MLS	

=== Disciplinary record ===
Rank	No.	Pos.	Player	MLS			Leagues Cup			Total		
Rank	No.	Pos.	Player	Booked	(yellow card) (yellow-red card)	Sent off (straight red)	Booked	(yellow card) (yellow-red card)	Sent off (straight red)	Booked	(yellow card) (yellow-red card)	Sent off (straight red)
1	11	FW	(Colombia) Cristian Dájome	8	1	0	0	0	0	8	1	0
2	43	MF	(Poland) Mateusz Klich	7	0	0	0	0	0	7	0	0
3	20	FW	(Belgium) Christian Benteke	6	0	1	0	0	0	6	0	1
4	22	MF	(Guatemala) Aaron Herrera	6	0	0	0	0	0	6	0	0
5	3	DF	(United States) Lucas Bartlett	5	0	1	0	0	0	5	0	1

== Honors and awards ==
=== MLS Player of the Matchday ===
Week	Player	Ref.
1	(Belgium) Christian Benteke	
13	(Belgium) Christian Benteke	

=== MLS Team of the Matchday ===
Week	Player	Position	Ref.
1	(Belgium) Christian Benteke	FW	
3	(Guatemala) Aaron Herrera	DF	
4	(United States) Alex Bono	Bench	
6	(Belgium) Christian Benteke	Bench	
7	(Poland) Mateusz Klich	MF	
9	(Guatemala) Aaron Herrera	Bench	
11	(Belgium) Christian Benteke	FW	
12	(United States) Jared Stroud	Bench	
13	(Belgium) Christian Benteke	FW	
17	(Belgium) Christian Benteke	Bench	
18	(Poland) Mateusz Klich	Bench	
26	(Colombia) Cristian Dájome	MF	
27	(Belgium) Christian Benteke	FW	

== See also ==
- 2024 Loudoun United FC season
