= Cristian Dájome =

Colombian footballer (born 1994)

Personal information
- Full name: Cristian Andrés Dájome Arboleda
- Date of birth: 3 January 1994 (age 32)
- Place of birth: Bogotá, Colombia
- Height: 1.72 m (5 ft 8 in)
- Position: Forward

Team information
- Current team: Inter Bogotá

Senior career*
Years	Team	Apps	(Gls)
2013–2015	Bogotá	65	(15)
2015	Cúcuta Deportivo	17	(4)
2016	Deportes Tolima	16	(2)
2016–2020	Atlético Nacional	28	(5)
2017	→ Deportivo Pasto (loan)	14	(2)
2018	→ América de Cali (loan)	33	(4)
2019–2020	→ Independiente del Valle (loan)	27	(5)
2020–2023	Vancouver Whitecaps	91	(15)
2023–2024	D.C. United	50	(5)
2025–2026	Santos Laguna	22	(4)
2026–	Inter Bogotá	0	(0)
- * Club domestic league appearances and goals as of 02:24, 05 December 2024 (UTC)

Cristian Andrés Dájome Arboleda (born 3 January 1994) is a Colombian professional footballer who plays as a winger for Liga DIMAYOR club Inter Bogotá.

== Career ==
=== Whitecaps FC ===
On 17 January 2020, Whitecaps FC acquired Cristian Dájome from Colombian club Atlético Nacional with the use of Targeted Allocation Money - pending receipt of his International Transfer Certificate (ITC), medical, work permit, and visa. Dájome agreed to an MLS contract through 2021 with an option for 2022.

=== D.C. United ===
On 25 April 2023, Dájome was traded to D.C. United in exchange for $550,000 in General Allocation Money. D.C. United declined his contract option following their 2024 season.

== Honours ==
=== Club ===
Atlético Nacional

- Copa Libertadores: 2016

Independiente del Valle

- Copa Sudamericana: 2019

Vancouver Whitecaps

- Canadian Championship: 2022

== Career statistics ==
As of 29 October 2024

Club	Season	League			Playoffs (Note: MLS Cup Playoffs)		Cup (Note: Includes Copa Colombia, Canadian Championship and U.S. Open Cup)		Continental		Other		Total	
Club	Season	Division	Apps	Goals	Apps	Goals	Apps	Goals	Apps	Goals	Apps	Goals	Apps	Goals
Bogotá	2013	Categoría Primera B	19	1	–		5	1	–		–		24	2
Bogotá	2014	Categoría Primera B	32	11	–		9	1	–		–		41	12
Bogotá	2015	Categoría Primera B	14	3	–		5	3	–		–		19	6
Bogotá	Total		65	15	–		19	5	–		–		84	20
Cúcuta Deportivo	2015	Categoría Primera A	17	4	–		–		–		–		17	4
Deportes Tolima	2016	Categoría Primera A	16	2	–		4	1	–		–		20	3
Atlético Nacional	2016	Categoría Primera A	17	3	–		4	0	1 (Note: Appearances in Copa Sudamericana)	0	1 (Note: Appearances in FIFA Club World Cup)	0	23	3
Atlético Nacional	2017	Categoría Primera A	11	2	–		–		2 (Note: One appearance in Recopa Sudamericana, One appearance in Copa Libertadores)	0	–		13	2
Atlético Nacional	Total		28	5	–		4	0	3	0	1	0	36	5
Deportivo Pasto (loan)	2017	Categoría Primera A	14	2	–		1	0	–		–		15	2
América de Cali (loan)	2018	Categoría Primera A	33	4	–		0	0	2	0	–		35	4
Independiente del Valle (loan)	2019	Liga Pro	27	5	–		–		11	4	–		38	9
Vancouver Whitecaps FC	2020	MLS	24	3	–		–		–		3 (Note: Appearances in Timbers Preseason Tournament)	0	27	3
Vancouver Whitecaps FC	2021	MLS	33	10	1	1	1	0	–		–		35	11
Vancouver Whitecaps FC	2022	MLS	28	2	–		4	0	–		–		32	2
Vancouver Whitecaps FC	2023	MLS	7	0	–		–		4 (Note: Appearances in CONCACAF Champions Cup)	0	–		11	0
Vancouver Whitecaps FC	Total		92	15	1	1	5	0	4	3	3	0	105	16
D.C. United	2023	MLS	19	2	–		1	0	3 (Note: Appearances in Leagues Cup)	0	–		23	2
D.C. United	2024	MLS	31	3	–		–		3	1	–		34	4
D.C. United	Total		50	5	–		1	0	6	1	–		57	6
Santos Laguna	2025	Liga MX	–		–		–		–		–		–	
Career total			342	57	1	1	34	6	26	8	4	0	407	72
