= Christopher McVey =

Swedish footballer (born 1997)

- McVey with San Diego FC in 2026

Personal information
- Full name: Christopher Donald McVey
- Date of birth: 12 April 1997 (age 29)
- Place of birth: Borås, Sweden
- Height: 1.92 m (6 ft 4 in)
- Position: Defender

Team information
- Current team: San Diego FC
- Number: 97

Youth career
- –2009: Sparsörs AIK
- 2009–2017: Elfsborg

Senior career*
Years	Team	Apps	(Gls)
2017–2021	Elfsborg	32	(0)
2019	→ Dalkurd (loan)	16	(1)
2022–2023	Inter Miami CF	50	(1)
2024	D.C. United	27	(1)
2025–	San Diego FC	32	(2)

International career
2014	Sweden U17	4	(1)
- * Club domestic league appearances and goals as of 22 October 2025

Christopher Donald McVey (born 12 April 1997) is a Swedish professional footballer who plays as a defender for Major League Soccer club San Diego FC.

== Club career ==
McVey started his career as a youth player at Sparsörs AIK and later joined IF Elfsborg at the age of 12 and its A-team in 2017.

On 4 March 2019, McVey joined Superettan side Dalkurd on loan until 15 July 2019.

On 14 January 2022, McVey signed a three-year deal with Major League Soccer club Inter Miami CF.

On 1 February 2024, D.C. United acquired McVey on a transfer from Inter Miami. D.C. United declined his contract option following their 2024 season. He was traded to expansion team San Diego FC on 11 December 2024 and signed a two-year contract.

== International career ==
In 2014, McVey played for the Sweden national under-17 team.

== Personal life ==
He holds both an American passport and a Swedish passport.

== Career statistics ==
=== Club ===
As of match played 29 October 2024

Appearances and goals by club, season and competition
Club	Season	League			National cup		Continental		Other		Total	
Club	Season	Division	Apps	Goals	Apps	Goals	Apps	Goals	Apps	Goals	Apps	Goals
Elfsborg	2017	Allsvenskan	1	0	0	0	—		—		1	0
Elfsborg	2018	Allsvenskan	1	0	0	0	—		—		1	0
Elfsborg	2020	Allsvenskan	7	0	3 (Note: Two appearances and one goal in 2019–20 Svenska Cupen, one appearance and one goal in 2020–21)	2	—		—		10	2
Elfsborg	2021	Allsvenskan	23	0	4 (Note: Three appearances in 2020–21 Svenska Cupen, one appearance in 2021–22)	0	5 (Note: Appearance(s) in UEFA Europa Conference League)	0	—		32	0
Elfsborg	Total		32	0	7	2	5	0	0	0	44	2
Dalkurd (loan)	2019	Superettan	16	1	2 (Note: One appearance in 2018–19 Svenska Cupen, one appearance in 2019–20)	0	—		—		18	1
Inter Miami CF	2022	Major League Soccer	34	1	3 (Note: Appearance(s) in U.S. Open Cup)	0	—		1 (Note: Appearance(s) in MLS Cup Playoffs)	0	38	1
Inter Miami CF	2023	Major League Soccer	16	0	4	0	3 (Note: Appearance(s) in Leagues Cup)	0	—		23	0
Inter Miami CF	Total		50	1	7	0	3	0	1	0	61	1
D.C. United	2024	Major League Soccer	27	1	—		1	0	0	0	28	1
Career total			125	3	16	2	9	0	1	0	151	5

== Honours ==
Inter Miami CF

- Leagues Cup: 2023
