= Jacob Murrell =

American soccer player (born 2004)

Personal information
- Full name: Jacob Murrell
- Date of birth: March 28, 2004 (age 22)
- Place of birth: Forest Hill, Maryland, United States
- Height: 6 ft 3 in (1.91 m)
- Position: Forward

Team information
- Current team: Falkirk
- Number: 24

College career
Years	Team	Apps	(Gls)
2022–2023	Georgetown Hoyas	40	(18)

Senior career*
Years	Team	Apps	(Gls)
2023	Annapolis Blues	10	(10)
2024–2026	D.C. United	59	(3)
2026–	Falkirk	11	(7)
- * Club domestic league appearances and goals as of 18:10, 17 October 2026 (UTC)

Jacob Murrell (born March 28, 2004) is an American professional soccer player who plays as a forward for Scottish Premiership club Falkirk.

Murrell previously played college soccer for Georgetown University, and high school soccer for the McDonogh School, the latter of which he was named Gatorade Player of the Year for Boys' Soccer, a national recognition for the top boys high school soccer player in the United States.

== Career ==
=== Early career ===
Murrell was born and raised in Forest Hill, Maryland which is the northeastern part of the Baltimore metropolitan area. He played high school soccer for all four of his seasons at the McDonogh School, a private school near Owings Mills, Maryland. Throughout his high school years, Murrell was used a versatile, utility player, playing multiple positions, before transitioning to forward his junior and senior years. Murrell played as a midfielder his freshman season and as a defender his sophomore year. Murrell had a breakout season his senior year, scoring 41 goals and providing 20 assists in 24 games, helping McDonogh finish the season with a 21–3–0 record. There, he helped McDonogh reach the A Conference championship, where they lost to Calvert Hall in the MIAA Conference A Championship. Unfortunately, Murrell's McDonogh side lost to Loyola Blakefield mid-season due to the heroic efforts of future veteran Jackson Graham.

In June 2022, Murrell was selected as the boys' soccer winner for the Gatorade National Player of the Year Award.

Ahead of the 2022 NCAA Division I men's soccer season, Murrell committed to playing college soccer for Georgetown, turning down offers from Maryland, Penn, and American.

Murrell scored 10 goals in 10 matches for the Annapolis Blues in 2023, leading them to 2023 NPSL Mid-Atlantic Regular Season Champions. Murrell scored a 97th-minute equalizer vs the Alexandria Reds to send the match to penalty kicks, where the Blues would win 4–2 in front of over 8,800 fans at Naval-Marine Corps Stadium in Annapolis.

=== D.C. United ===
On December 19, 2023, Murrell was selected seventh overall in the 2024 MLS SuperDraft by local MLS side, D.C. United. On January 5, 2024, he signed a contract with the club forgoing his final two years of collegiate eligibility. He scored his first professional goal on May 4, 2024, in a 2–2 draw with the Philadelphia Union.

=== Falkirk ===
On 21 August 2026, Murrell joined Scottish Premiership club Falkirk on an initial two-year deal. He made his debut as a substitute away to Celtic and scored his first goal for the club with a header away at Dundee United's Tannadice. After netting five goals in his first ten appearances, Murrell was named the Scottish Premiership Player of the Month for October 2026, followed by a brace in a 5–2 away win over Heart of Midlothian on 8 November 2026.

== Career statistics ==
=== Club ===
As of 21 August 2026

Appearances and goals by club, season and competition
Club	Season	League			National Cup (Note: Includes U.S. Open Cup)		Continental		Other		Total	
Club	Season	Division	Apps	Goals	Apps	Goals	Apps	Goals	Apps	Goals	Apps	Goals
D.C. United	2024	Major League Soccer	27	1	—		3 (Note: Appearance(s) in Leagues Cup)	0	—		30	1
D.C. United	2025	Major League Soccer	24	2	2	1	—		—		26	3
D.C. United	2026	Major League Soccer	8	0	1	0	—		—		9	0
Career total			59	3	3	1	3	0	—		65	4
