= Matti Peltola =

Finnish footballer (born 2002)

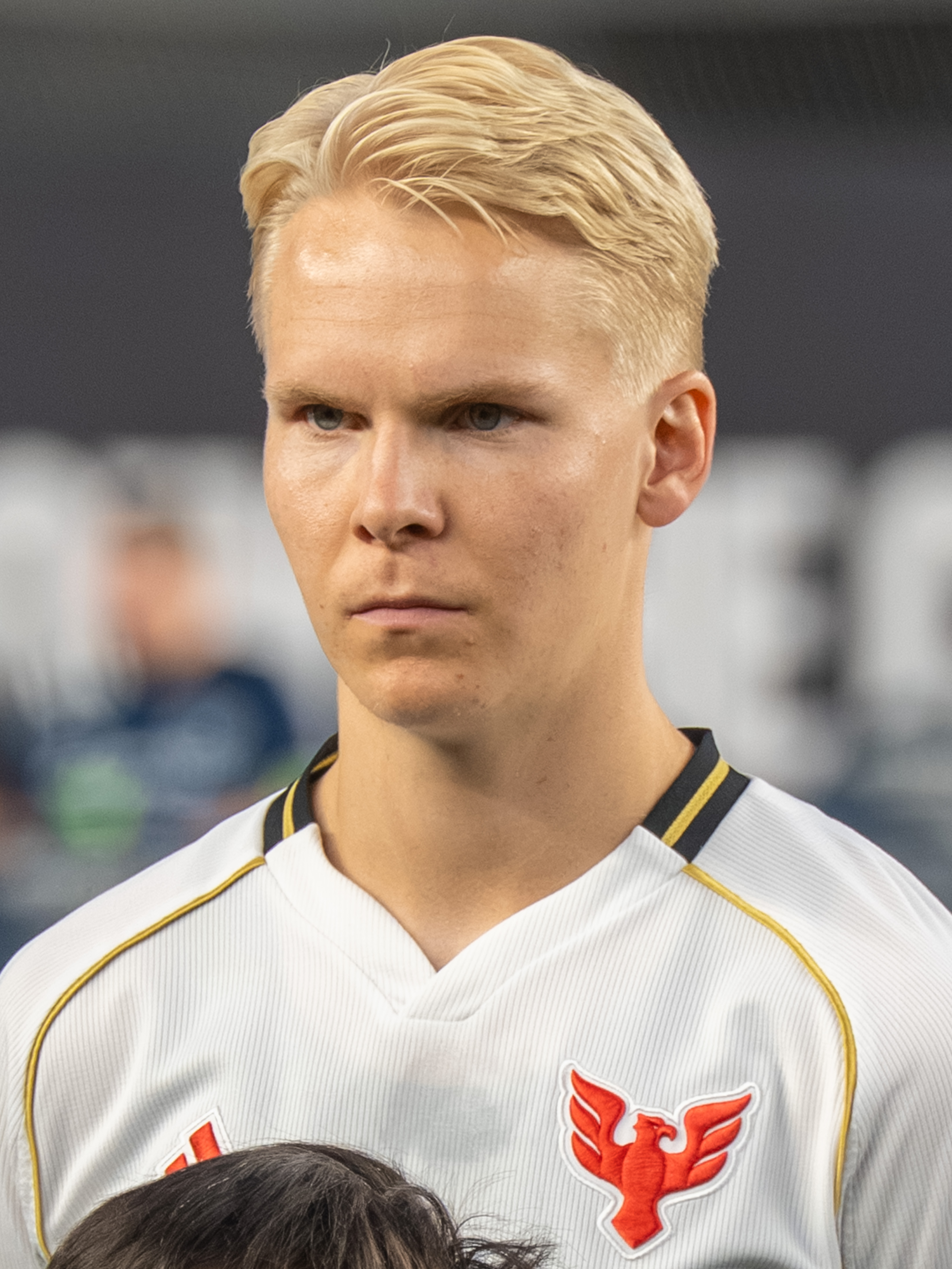
- Peltola with DC United in 2025

Personal information
- Date of birth: 3 July 2002 (age 24)
- Place of birth: Espoo, Finland
- Height: 1.85 m (6 ft 1 in)
- Positions: Midfielder; defender

Team information
- Current team: D.C. United
- Number: 4

Youth career
- Keimolan Kaiku
- 2012–2018: HJK

Senior career*
Years	Team	Apps	(Gls)
2018–2022	Klubi 04	29	(2)
2019–2023	HJK	53	(2)
2024–	D.C. United	71	(1)

International career^{‡}
2018	Finland U16	3	(0)
2019	Finland U17	8	(0)
2019	Finland U18	2	(0)
2021–2025	Finland U21	7	(1)
2023–	Finland	27	(0)
- * Club domestic league appearances and goals as of 22 May 2026 ‡ National team caps and goals as of 7 October 2026

Matti Peltola (born 3 July 2002) is a Finnish professional footballer who plays as midfielder and defender for Major League Soccer franchise D.C. United and the Finland national team.

== Early life ==
Born in Espoo, Peltola started playing football in Belgium, where his family lived for a couple of years due to father's work. After returning to Finland, Peltola joined Keimolan Kaiku's youth team in Vantaa.

== Club career ==
=== HJK Helsinki ===
Peltola played in the youth team of HJK in Munkkiniemi along with Santeri Väänänen since the age of ten, before making his debut in the first team in Veikkausliiga on 19 October 2019 against Ilves.

On 21 August 2020, Peltola signed a professional contract with the club, on a two-year deal with an option for an additional year.

On 23 August 2022, HJK announced that they had exercised their option to keep Peltola in Helsinki for the 2023 season. He scored his first goal in the league on 9 May 2023 in away game against KTP.

=== D.C. United ===
On 2 February 2024, Peltola signed with Major League Soccer (MLS) franchise D.C. United on a four-year contract, with the option to extend, as a Young Designated Player. D.C. United had earlier acquired Peltola's MLS Discovery Priority rights from Minnesota United for $75,000. He debuted in MLS with his new team on 25 February 2024 in the 2024 season opening game, after being named in the starting line-up in a 3–1 home win against an old rival franchise New England Revolution.

== International career ==
Peltola represented Finland at various youth national teams, from under-16 to under-21 levels.

Peltola made his Finland senior national team debut on 12 January 2023, in a friendly match against Estonia. On 26 March 2023, he made his competitive international debut in a 1–0 away win against Northern Ireland. He was capped four times in total for Finland in the UEFA Euro 2024 qualification campaign in 2023.

== Personal life ==
Peltola is a fluent French-speaker and has attended the French–Finnish school of Helsinki. Growing up, he also played ice hockey, before choosing football over it, thanks to his mother's advice.

== Career statistics ==
=== Club ===
As of 22 May 2026

Appearances and goals by club, season and competition
Club	Season	League			National cup (Note: Includes Finnish Cup and U.S. Open Cup)		League cup (Note: Includes Kakkonen Cup and Finnish League Cup)		Continental		Other		Total	
Club	Season	Division	Apps	Goals	Apps	Goals	Apps	Goals	Apps	Goals	Apps	Goals	Apps	Goals
Klubi 04	2018	Ykkönen	1	0	0	0	—		—		—		1	0
Klubi 04	2019	Kakkonen	21	1	0	0	1	0	—		—		22	1
Klubi 04	2020	Kakkonen	1	1	2	0	—		—		—		3	1
Klubi 04	2021	Ykkönen	3	0	0	0	—		—		—		3	0
Klubi 04	2022	Kakkonen	3	0	0	0	—		—		—		3	0
Klubi 04	Total		29	2	2	0	1	0	0	0	0	0	32	2
HJK	2019	Veikkausliiga	1	0	0	0	—		0	0	—		1	0
HJK	2020	Veikkausliiga	0	0	4	1	—		—		—		4	1
HJK	2021	Veikkausliiga	16	0	0	0	—		9 (Note: Appearances in UEFA Champions League, UEFA Europa League and UEFA Europa Conference League)	0	—		25	0
HJK	2022	Veikkausliiga	15	0	3	0	2	0	12 (Note: Appearances in UEFA Champions League and UEFA Europa League)	0	—		32	0
HJK	2023	Veikkausliiga	21	2	0	0	5	0	8	0	—		34	2
HJK	Total		53	2	7	1	7	0	29	0	0	0	96	3
D.C. United	2024	MLS	31	0	0	0	—		—		3 (Note: Appearance(s) in Leagues Cup)	0	34	0
D.C. United	2025	MLS	26	0	3	0	—		—		—		29	0
D.C. United	2026	MLS	14	1	1	1	—		—		—		15	2
D.C. United	Total		71	1	4	1	0	0	0	0	3	0	78	2
Career total			153	5	13	2	8	0	29	0	3	0	206	7

=== International ===
As of match played on 6 October 2026

National team	Year	Competitive		Friendly		Total	
National team	Year	Apps	Goals	Apps	Goals	Apps	Goals
Finland	2023	4 (Note: Appearances in the UEFA Euro 2024 qualification.)	0	1	0	5	0
Finland	2024	6 (Note: Appearances in the UEFA Euro 2024 qualification and 2024–25 UEFA Nations League B.)	0	3	0	9	0
Finland	2025	7 (Note: Appearances in the 2026 FIFA World Cup qualification.)	0	2	0	9	0
Finland	2026	2 (Note: Appearances in the 2026–27 UEFA Nations League C.)	0	2 (Note: Includes two appearances in the 2026 FIFA Series.)	0	4	0
Total		19	0	8	0	27	0

== Honours ==
HJK Helsinki

- Veikkausliiga: 2020, 2021, 2022, 2023
- Finnish Cup: 2020
- Finnish League Cup: 2023

Finland

- FIFA Series: 2026

Individual

- Veikkausliiga Team of the Year: 2023
