= Garrison Tubbs =

American soccer player (born 2002)

Personal information
- Full name: Garrison Isaiah Tubbs
- Date of birth: February 17, 2002 (age 24)
- Place of birth: Brunswick, Georgia, United States
- Height: 1.89 m (6 ft 2 in)
- Position: Center back

Team information
- Current team: Orange County SC (on loan from D.C. United)
- Number: 6

Youth career
- 2015–2018: Jacksonville Armada
- 2018–2020: Atlanta United

College career
Years	Team	Apps	(Gls)
2020–2023	Wake Forest Demon Deacons	47	(2)

Senior career*
Years	Team	Apps	(Gls)
2019–2020	Atlanta United 2	12	(0)
2024–	D.C. United	23	(0)
2025	→ Loudoun United (loan)	4	(1)
2026–	→ Orange County SC (loan)	23	(2)
- * Club domestic league appearances and goals as of 13:53, 10 November 2026 (UTC)

Garrison Isaiah Tubbs (born February 17, 2002) is an American professional soccer player who plays for Orange County SC in the USL Championship, on loan from D.C. United of Major League Soccer.

== Club career ==
=== Collegiate ===
Following the conclusion of the 2020 season, Tubbs was named a freshman (first year) All-American by TopDrawer Soccer, for being one of the top first year college soccer players in the United States.

=== Senior ===
On July 27, 2019, Tubbs appeared for Atlanta United 2, the USL Championship affiliate of Atlanta United, as a 71st-minute substitute in a 4–2 loss to North Carolina FC.

On December 15, 2023, Tubbs was eligible for the 2024 MLS SuperDraft, but was signed directly by Atlanta United as a Homegrown Player and taken off the board. However, just four days later, Tubbs was dealt to D.C. United for $125,000 in GAM, plus extra if certain conditions were met.

Tubbs joined USL Championship side Loudoun United on a short-term loan in April 2025, playing in one USL Cup match before being recalled. He returned to Loudoun on another loan on September 12, 2025.

== Career statistics ==
=== Club ===
As of match played November 2, 2025

Appearances and goals by club, season and competition
Club	Season	League			National cup		Continental		Other		Total	
Club	Season	Division	Apps	Goals	Apps	Goals	Apps	Goals	Apps	Goals	Apps	Goals
Atlanta United 2	2019	USL Championship	6	0	—		—		—		6	0
Atlanta United 2	2020	USL Championship	6	0	—		—		—		6	0
Atlanta United 2	Total		12	0	—		—		—		12	0
D.C. United	2024	Major League Soccer	15	0	—		—		1 (Note: Appearance(s) in Leagues Cup)	0	16	0
D.C. United	2025	Major League Soccer	8	0	2 (Note: Appearance in U.S. Open Cup)	1	—		0	0	10	1
D.C. United	Total		23	0	2	1	—		1	0	26	1
Loudoun United	2025	USL Championship	4	1	—		—		1 (Note: Appearance in USL Cup)	0	5	1
Career total			39	1	2	1	—		2	0	43	2
