= Nate Crockford =

American soccer player (born 2002)

Personal information
- Full name: Nathan Donald Crockford
- Date of birth: September 6, 2002 (age 24)
- Place of birth: Northfield, Illinois, United States
- Height: 6 ft 4 in (1.93 m)
- Position: Goalkeeper

Team information
- Current team: San Jose Earthquakes
- Number: 22

Youth career
- Chicago FC United
- 2020–2021: Chicago Fire FC

College career
Years	Team	Apps	(Gls)
2021–2022	UCLA Bruins	23	(0)
2023	Wisconsin Badgers	17	(0)

Senior career*
Years	Team	Apps	(Gls)
2024	D.C. United	0	(0)
2025	FC Cincinnati 2	5	(0)
2026–	San Jose Earthquakes	0	(0)
- * Club domestic league appearances and goals as of 19:20, July 26, 2025 (UTC)

Nathan Donald Crockford (born September 6, 2002) is an American soccer player who plays for Major League Soccer club San Jose Earthquakes.

== Early life ==
Crockford played youth soccer with the Chicago FC United, later joining the Chicago Fire FC Academy in 2020.

== College career ==
In 2021, Crockford began attending UCLA, where he played for the men's soccer team. He made his collegiate debut on November 7, 2021 against the Oregon State Beavers. On August 25, 2022, he recorded his first shutout in a 1-0 victory over the UC Irvine Anteaters. At the end of his sophomore season, he was named to the Academic All-District team, and was an honorable mention on the Pac-12 All-Conference Team, after leading the Pac-12 Conference in shutouts, saves, and save percentage.

For his junior season in 2023, he transferred to the University of Wisconsin–Madison to play for the men's soccer team. Ahead of his junior season, he was named to the Big Ten Conference Preseason Watch List. On August 24, 2023, he made his debut for Wisconsin, earning a shutout in a 1-0 victory over the Purdue Fort Wayne Mastodons. After recording shutouts in the first two matches of the season, he was named to the TopDrawerSoccer National Team of the Week. In October 2023, he was named the Big Ten Defensive Player of the Week.

== Club career ==
At the 2024 MLS SuperDraft, Crockford was selected in the third round (65th overall) by D.C. United. In January 2024, he signed a one-year deal with options in 2025, 2026, and 2027. He debuted with the club in a friendly on July 20, 2024 against Scottish club Celtic.

In January 2025, he signed with MLS Next Pro club FC Cincinnati 2. He made his debut on March 13, 2025 against New England Revolution II.

== Personal life ==
Crockford has a twin brother, Charlie, who he played youth soccer with as well as college soccer at both UCLA and Wisconsin.
