= Kristian Fletcher =

American soccer player (born 2005)

Personal information
- Full name: Kristian George Fletcher
- Date of birth: August 6, 2005 (age 21)
- Place of birth: Bowie, Maryland, U.S.
- Height: 6 ft 0 in (1.83 m)
- Position: Winger

Team information
- Current team: FC Cincinnati
- Number: 14

Youth career
- 2020–2021: Bethesda SC
- 2021–2022: D.C. United

Senior career*
Years	Team	Apps	(Gls)
2022	Loudoun United	17	(4)
2022–2025	D.C. United	28	(2)
2023	→ Swansea City (loan)	0	(0)
2024–2025	→ Nottingham Forest (loan)	0	(0)
2026–	FC Cincinnati	0	(0)

International career^{‡}
2022	United States U17	1	(0)
2022–2024	United States U19	2	(0)
2025	United States U20	7	(3)
- * Club domestic league appearances and goals as of January 13, 2026 ‡ National team caps and goals as of June 10, 2025

Kristian George Fletcher (born August 6, 2005) is an American professional soccer player who plays as a winger for Major League Soccer club FC Cincinnati.

== Club career ==
Fletcher started his career playing for MLS Next club Bethesda SC and Landon School in Bethesda, Maryland. As a junior, Fletcher was named the All-Metro Player of the Year after scoring 26 goals and contributing 9 assists over the course of the 17-game season. He also led the team to the Interstate Athletic Conference (IAC) Championship, scoring the game winner.

During the summer of 2022, Fletcher went on trial with a number of European academies including Manchester United and Borussia Dortmund. Following the trip, Fox Sports reporter Keith Costigan announced that Fletcher would be signing for Bundesliga club Borussia Dortmund, although it was never confirmed.

Ahead of the 2022 USL Championship season, Fletcher signed a contract with Loudoun United FC. He played 12 matches and scored four goals before being promoted to D.C. United on a homegrown contract. On August 31, 2022, he made his MLS debut in a 2–1 win at New York City FC. Fletcher scored his first goal with D.C. United on October 9, 2022, during a 5–2 loss against FC Cincinnati.

Fletcher joined Welsh club Swansea City on loan for the first half of the 2023–24 season, where he linked up with the under-21 side. On August 30, 2024, Fletcher again returned to the United Kingdom, joining Nottingham Forest's B team squad on loan. Fletcher returned to D.C. United on April 22, 2025, after making 12 appearances and scoring three goals for Forest's B Team.

He joined FC Cincinnati on January 13, 2026.

== International career ==
Holding both U.S. and British passports, Fletcher is eligible to represent the United States and Scotland. He holds British citizenship via his father who was born in Scotland.

He has been capped by the United States at both under-15 and under-19 level, including spring 2022 friendlies against both England and Norway in Marbella, Spain.

== Career statistics ==
=== Club ===
As of match played 21 January 2025

Appearances and goals by club, season and competition
Club	Season	League			National cup (Note: Includes U.S. Open Cup)		League cup (Note: Includes Welsh League Cup, National League Cup)		Continental		Other		Total	
Club	Season	Division	Apps	Goals	Apps	Goals	Apps	Goals	Apps	Goals	Apps	Goals	Apps	Goals
Loudoun United	2022	USL Championship	17	4	—		—		—		—		17	4
D.C. United	2022	MLS	2	1	0	0	—		—		—		2	1
D.C. United	2023	MLS	10	0	2	0	—		1 (Note: Appearance(s) in Leagues Cup)	0	—		13	0
D.C. United	2024	MLS	13	1	0	0	—		0	0	—		13	1
D.C. United	Total		25	2	2	0	—		1	0	0	0	28	2
Swansea City U21 (loan)	2023-24	—			—		1	2	—		—		1	2
Nottingham Forest U21 (loan)	2024-25	—			—		2	0	—		1 (Note: Appearance(s) in EFL Trophy)	0	3	0
Career total			42	6	2	0	3	2	1	0	1	0	49	8
