= 2026 D.C. United season =

D.C. United 2026 soccer season

D.C. United
2026 season
- General manager: Erkut Sogut
- Head coach: René Weiler
- Stadium: Audi Field
- MLS: Conference: 13th Overall: 26th
- MLS Cup playoffs: Did not qualify
- U.S. Open Cup: Round of 16
- Top goalscorer: League: Tai Baribo (16); All: Tai Baribo (16)
- Highest home attendance: 72,026 vs. Inter Miami CF; March 7 (MLS)
- Lowest home attendance: 6,508 vs. One Knoxville SC; April 15 (U.S. Open Cup)
- Average home league attendance: League: 19,070; All: 18,330
- Biggest win: 2–0 vs. New York City FC (Away, May 3, MLS)
- Biggest defeat: 0–4 vs. FC Dallas (Home, April 4, MLS); 0–4 vs. Inter Miami CF (Away, October 10, MLS)
Home colors	Away colors	Third colors
- All statistics correct as of October 21, 2026.

The 2026 season is D.C. United's 31st in existence and its 31st consecutive season in the top division of American soccer, Major League Soccer. The season is the first full season with René Weiler leading the club as manager. The MLS regular season began on February 21 and will conclude on November 7.

== Management and squad ==
=== Front office ===
Position	Name
Co-chairman and CEO	(United States) Jason Levien
Co-chairman	(United States) Stephen Kaplan
Minority Owners	(United States) Romie Chaudhari (United States) Charlie Chasin (United States) Adam Gerry (United States) Robert Hernreich (United States) Mark Ingram II (United States) Mario Mims (United States) Devin Talbott
President, Business Ops	(United States) Danita Johnson
Senior Vice President, Revenue	(United States) James Armold
Chief Financial Officer	(United States) Dan Franceschini

=== Technical staff ===
Position	Name
General Manager	(Germany) Erik Sogut
Head Coach	(Switzerland) René Weiler
Assistant Coach	(Switzerland) Thomas Binggeli
Assistant Coach	(Uruguay) Alex Martínez
Goalkeeping Coach	(United States) Cody Mizell
Director of Player Personnel	(Haiti) Clarens Cheridieu
Head Performance Coach	(United States) Matt Challoner

=== First-team roster ===
Squad No.	Name	Nationality	Position(s)	Date of birth (Age)	Apps	Goals	Assists	Signed from
Goalkeepers
1	Sean Johnson	(United States)	GK	May 31, 1989 (age 37)	31	0	0	(Canada) Toronto FC
20	Grant Leveille	(Haiti)	GK	July 3, 2008 (age 18)	0	0	0	(United States) D.C. United Academy
24	Jordan Farr	(United States)	GK	October 5, 1994 (age 32)	5	0	0	(United States) Tampa Bay Rowdies
26	Alex Bono	(United States)	GK	April 25, 1994 (age 32)	50	0	0	(United States) New England Revolution
Defenders
2	Kimito Nono	(Japan)	RB / RM	March 26, 2002 (age 24)	18	3	2	(Japan) Kashima Antlers
3	Lucas Bartlett	(United States)	CB	July 26, 1997 (age 29)	98	6	5	(United States) St. Louis City SC
5	Silvan Hefti	(Switzerland)	RB	October 25, 1997 (age 29)	32	2	4	(Germany) Hamburger SV
6	Keisuke Kurokawa	(Japan)	LB	April 13, 1997 (age 29)	35	0	6	(Japan) Gamba Osaka
12	Conner Antley	(United States)	RB / CB	March 22, 1995 (age 31)	34	1	2	(United States) Tampa Bay Rowdies
13	Sean Nealis	(United States)	CB	January 13, 1997 (age 29)	16	0	1	(United States) New York Red Bulls
15	Kye Rowles	(Australia)	CB	June 24, 1998 (age 28)	62	2	0	(Scotland) Heart of Midlothian
16	Garrison Tubbs	(United States)	CB	February 17, 2002 (age 24)	26	1	1	(United States) Atlanta United FC
27	Nikola Markovic	(Canada)	CB	July 22, 2004 (age 22)	24	1	1	(United States) NC State Wolfpack
Midfielders
4	Matti Peltola	(Finland)	DM / CB	July 3, 2002 (age 24)	95	2	1	(Finland) HJK Helsinki
8	Jared Stroud	(United States)	LW / RW	July 10, 1996 (age 30)	68	6	9	(United States) St. Louis City SC
21	Andre Dozzell	(England)	CM	May 2, 1999 (age 27)	19	1	1	(England) Portsmouth
23	Brandon Servania	(United States)	CM	March 12, 1999 (age 27)	67	0	4	(Canada) Toronto FC
25	Jackson Hopkins	(United States)	AM / SS	July 1, 2004 (age 22)	104	6	2	(United States) D.C. United Academy
40	Kamil Castillo	(Dominican Republic)	MF	January 3, 2010 (age 16)	0	0	0	(United States) D.C. United Academy
48	Gavin Turner	(United States)	AM / LW	January 5, 2007 (age 19)	5	0	0	(United States) D.C. United Academy
77	Hosei Kijima	(Japan)	CM	July 1, 2002 (age 24)	44	2	1	(United States) San Diego FC
Forwards
7	Peglow	(Brazil)	LW / RW	January 7, 2002 (age 24)	58	5	9	(Poland) Radomiak Radom
9	Tai Baribo	(Israel)	ST	January 15, 1998 (age 28)	25	16	1	(United States) Philadelphia Union
11	Louis Munteanu	(Romania)	ST	June 16, 2002 (age 24)	22	6	3	(Romania) CFR Cluj
14	Gabriel Segal	(United States)	CF	May 17, 2001 (age 25)	0	0	0	(United States) Houston Dynamo
18	Richie Aman	(United States)	FW	March 16, 2004 (age 22)	0	0	0	(United States) Washington Huskies
19	Hakim Karamoko	(United States)	FW	November 1, 2005 (age 21)	2	0	0	(United States) NC State Wolfpack
22	Nathan Ordaz	(El Salvador)	FW	January 12, 2004 (age 22)	17	0	2	(United States) Los Angeles FC
32	Oscar Avilez	(United States)	FW	March 16, 2010 (age 16)	6	0	0	(United States) D.C. United Academy

== Transfers ==
=== MLS SuperDraft picks ===
2026 D.C. United SuperDraft Picks
Round	Selection	Player	Position	College	Status
1	1	(Canada) Nikola Markovic	DF	NC State	Signed to first-team (GA)
1	8	(United States) Richie Aman	MF	Washington	Signed to first-team (pre-signed senior)
2	31	(United States) Isaac Emojong	MF	Utah Valley	Returned to college (Portland)
3	61	(Cameroon) Stephane Njike	FW	Maryland	Returned to college (Indiana)
3	85	(Germany) Lasse Kelp	DF	Maryland	Signed with Pittsburgh Riverhounds

=== Transfers in ===
Pos	Player	Transferred from	Fee/Notes	Date	Source
FW	(Israel) Tai Baribo	(United States) Philadelphia Union	$4,000,000 (Note: Initial $4,000,000 plus $600,000 in possible incentives.)	December 17, 2025	
DF	(Canada) Nikola Markovic	(United States) NC State Wolfpack	Drafted (Note: Nikola Markovic signed a GA contract with Major League Soccer prior to being drafted, counting him as a GA player for D.C. United for three seasons.)	December 18, 2025	
MF	(United States) Richie Aman	(United States) Washington Huskies	Drafted (Note: Drafted as a pre-signed senior.)	December 18, 2025	
DF	(United States) Sean Nealis	(United States) New York Red Bulls	$350,000 (Note: $350,000 payment through General Allocation Money.)	December 22, 2025	
GK	(United States) Sean Johnson	(Canada) Toronto FC	Free	December 23, 2025	
DF	(Japan) Keisuke Kurokawa	(Japan) Gamba Osaka	Free	December 30, 2025	
FW	(United States) Gabriel Segal	(United States) Houston Dynamo	Free (Note: MLS rights acquired in the 2025 MLS Re-Entry Draft)	January 4, 2026	
FW	(Romania) Louis Munteanu	(Romania) CFR Cluj	$7,000,000	January 5, 2026	
GK	(United States) Alex Bono	(United States) New England Revolution	$50,000 (Note: $50,000 payment through General Allocation Money, with extra $75,000 GAM if a new contract is offered next year.)	January 26, 2026	
DF	(Switzerland) Silvan Hefti	(Germany) Hamburger SV		January 29, 2026	
GK	(Haiti) Grant Leveille	(United States) D.C. United Academy	Homegrown signing	February 25, 2026	
MF	(England) Andre Dozzell	(England) Portsmouth	Free	May 6, 2026	
MF	(El Salvador) Nathan Ordaz	(United States) Los Angeles FC	$2,375,000 (Note: U-22 Initiative. Plus up to $500K extra in incentives and undisclosed sell-on fee)	July 13, 2026	
DF	(Japan) Kimito Nono	(Japan) Kashima Antlers		July 29, 2026	
MF	(Dominican Republic) Kamil Castillo	(United States) D.C. United Academy	Homegrown signing	July 31, 2026	

=== Transfers out ===
Pos	Player	Transferred To	Fee/Notes	Date	Source
GK	(United States) Luis Barraza	(United States) Inter Miami CF	End of contract	November 26, 2025	
FW	(Belgium) Christian Benteke	(United Arab Emirates) Al Wahda	Option Declined	November 26, 2025	
FW	(United States) Derek Dodson		Option Declined	November 26, 2025	
FW	(United States) Kristian Fletcher	(United States) FC Cincinnati	Option Declined	November 26, 2025	
MF	(Costa Rica) Randall Leal	(Costa Rica) Herediano	Option Declined	November 26, 2025	
DF	(Canada) Lukas MacNaughton	(United States) St. Louis City SC	Option Declined	November 26, 2025	
DF	(Canada) Rida Zouhir	(Greece) Egaleo	Option Declined	November 26, 2025	
MF	(Cameroon) Boris Enow	(Israel) Beitar Jerusalem	Undisclosed	December 24, 2025	
FW	(Senegal) Dominique Badji	(United States) Phoenix Rising	Waived	January 12, 2026	
DF	(Austria) David Schnegg	(United States) Charlotte FC	Waived	January 12, 2026	
GK	(South Korea) Kim Joon-hong	(South Korea) Suwon Samsung Bluewings	Bought off loan	June 4, 2026	
DF	(Guatemala) Aaron Herrera		Waived	June 10, 2026	
MF	(Brazil) Gabriel Pirani	(United States) San Diego FC	$350K GAM (Note: Plus up to $650K GAM in incentives, and undisclosed sell-on percentage)	July 9, 2026	
FW	(United States) Jacob Murrell	(Scotland) Falkirk		August 21, 2026	
MF	(United States) Caden Clark	(United States) Seattle Sounders	Second-round pick in the 2028 MLS SuperDraft (Note: Plus $50K GAM if Clark remains on Seattle's roster in 2027)	September 3, 2026	

=== Loans out ===
Date	Pos.	Player	To	Date until	Ref.
January 20, 2026	GK	(South Korea) Kim Joon-hong	(South Korea) Suwon Samsung Bluewings	June 4, 2026	
March 4, 2026	MF	(United States) Richie Aman	(United States) Loudoun United	December 30, 2026	
March 13, 2026	DF	(United States) Garrison Tubbs	(United States) Orange County SC	December 30, 2026	
May 27, 2026	FW	(United States) Hakim Karamoko	(United States) Forward Madison FC	December 30, 2026	
June 5, 2026	GK	(United States) Jordan Farr	(United States) Loudoun United	June 29, 2026	
August 7, 2026	DF	(United States) Conner Antley	(United States) Tampa Bay Rowdies	September 14, 2026	
September 3, 2026	GK	(United States) Jordan Farr	(United States) Loudoun United	December 30, 2026	

Transfer notes

== Non-competitive ==
=== Preseason friendlies ===
January 31	LA Galaxy	4–1	D.C. United	Carson, California
17:30 EST	Reus; Nascimento; Aude; Sanabria	Report	Clark	Stadium: Dignity Health Sports Park; Attendance: 0 (closed-door)

February 7 CVI	Portland Timbers	0–0	D.C. United	Indio, California
17:30 EST				Stadium: Empire Polo Club

February 11 CVI	D.C. United	0–0	Minnesota United	Indio, California
15:30 EDT				Stadium: Empire Polo Club

February 14	D.C. United	4–1	St. Louis City	Indio, California
TBD				Stadium: Empire Polo Club

=== Midseason friendlies ===
August 5 DMV derby	D.C. United	3–2	Loudoun United	Washington, D.C.
19:30 EDT	Markovic 14'; Ordaz 23'; Avilez 26'		Úlfarsson 10'; D'Agostino 66'	Stadium: Audi Field

== Competitive ==
=== Major League Soccer ===
==== Table ====
===== Eastern Conference =====
MLS Eastern Conference table (2026)
Pos	Team	Pld	W	L	T	GF	GA	GD	Pts
11	New York City FC	34	10	12	12	49	45	+4	42
12	Toronto FC	34	9	13	12	52	67	−15	39
13	Atlanta United FC	34	9	19	6	43	60	−17	33
14	D.C. United	34	7	15	12	39	61	−22	33
15	CF Montréal	34	6	20	8	37	69	−32	26

Source: MLS
Rules for classification: 1) points; 2) total wins; 3) total goal differential; 4) total goals scored; 5) fewer disciplinary points; 6) away goal differential; 7) away goals scored; 8) home goals differential; 9) home goals scored; 10) coin toss (2 clubs tied) or drawing of lots (≥3 clubs tied)

===== Overall =====
Overall MLS standings table
Pos	Team	Pld	W	L	T	GF	GA	GD	Pts
26	Austin FC	34	8	16	10	42	65	−23	34
27	Atlanta United FC	34	9	19	6	43	60	−17	33
28	D.C. United	34	7	15	12	39	61	−22	33
29	Sporting Kansas City	34	7	22	5	40	81	−41	26
30	CF Montréal	34	6	20	8	37	69	−32	26

Source: MLS
Rules for classification: 1) points; 2) total wins; 3) total goal differential; 4) total goals scored; 5) fewer disciplinary points; 6) away goal differential; 7) away goals scored; 8) home goals differential; 9) home goals scored; 10) coin toss (2 clubs tied) or drawing of lots (≥3 clubs tied)

==== Match results ====
February 21 1	D.C. United	1–0	Philadelphia Union	Washington, D.C.
19:30 EST	Baribo 23'; Hopkins (yellow card) 89'; Peglow (yellow card) 90+4'	Report	Makhanya (yellow card) 41'; Bueno (yellow card) 45'; Alladoh (red card) 59'; Sery Larsen (yellow card) 80'; Jean Jacques (yellow card) 88'	Stadium: Audi Field; Attendance: 18,003; Referee: Guido Gonzales Jr.

March 1 2	Austin FC	1–0	D.C. United	Austin, Texas
14:30 EST	Torres (yellow card) 29'; Pereira (yellow card) 79'; Ramirez 82'; Šabović (yellow card) 87'	Report	Stroud (yellow card) 12'; Kurokawa (yellow card) 90+3'; Pirani (yellow card) 90+6'	Stadium: Q2 Stadium; Attendance: 20,738; Referee: Lorenzo Hernandez

March 7 3	D.C. United	1–2	Inter Miami CF	Baltimore, Maryland
16:30 EST	Peglow (yellow card) 58'; Baribo 75'	Report	De Paul 17'; Messi 27'; St. Clair (yellow card) 87'	Stadium: M&T Bank Stadium; Attendance: 72,026; Referee: Filip Dujic

March 14 4	Chicago Fire FC	1–2	D.C. United	Chicago, Illinois
20:30 EDT	Zinckernagel (yellow card) 24'; Elliott (yellow card) 57'; D'Avilla (yellow card) 54'; Cuypers 81' (pen.)	Report	Hopkins (yellow card) 34'; Peltola 84'; Baribo 90+5' (pen.)	Stadium: Soldier Field; Attendance: 15,845; Referee: Sergii Demianchuk

March 21 5	Atlanta United FC	0–0	D.C. United	Atlanta, Georgia
19:30 EDT	Muyumba (yellow card) 60'	Report	Bartlett (yellow card) 68'	Stadium: Mercedes-Benz Stadium; Attendance: 35,418; Referee: Jair Marrufo

April 4 6	D.C. United	0–4	FC Dallas	Washington, D.C.
19:30 EDT	Bartlett (yellow card) 45'; Herrera (yellow card) 83'	Report	Farrington 16'; Delgado 45+1'; Norris (yellow card) 67'; Urhoghide 78'; Musa 90+1'	Stadium: Audi Field; Attendance: 19,215; Referee: Rubiel Vazquez

April 11 7	New England Revolution	1–0	D.C. United	Foxborough, Massachusetts
19:30 EDT	Yusuf 35'	Report		Stadium: Gillette Stadium; Attendance: 15,454; Referee: Jon Freemon

April 18 8	Philadelphia Union	0–0	D.C. United	Chester, Pennsylvania
19:30 EDT		Report	Baribo (yellow card) 35'; Peglow (yellow card) 37'; Markovic (yellow card) 60'	Stadium: Subaru Park; Attendance: 18,529; Referee: Lorenzo Hernandez

April 22 9	New York Red Bulls	4–4	D.C. United	Harrison, New Jersey
19:30 EDT	Hall 15'; Donkor 21'; Mehmeti (yellow card) 50'; Ruvalcaba 52', 71'	Report	Baribo 37', 59', 80'; Hopkins 54'; Peltola (yellow card) 86'; Clark (yellow card) 90'	Stadium: Sports Illustrated Stadium; Attendance: 13,309; Referee: Marcos de Oliveira

April 25 10	D.C. United	3–2	Orlando City SC	Washington, D.C.
19:30 EDT	Hopkins 10'; Bartlett (yellow card) 21'; Munteanu 84'; Rowles 90'; Stroud (yellow card) 90+2'; Kurokawa (yellow card) 90+4'	Report	Iago (yellow card) 4'; Ellis 57'; Spicer 67'; Otávio (yellow card) 74'; Cartagena (yellow card) 90+8'	Stadium: Audi Field; Attendance: 14,040; Referee: Chris Penso

May 3 11	New York City FC	0–2	D.C. United	New York, New York
16:30 EDT	Fernández (yellow card) 80'	Report	Kurokawa (yellow card) 26'; Munteanu 29', 75' (pen.); Hefti (yellow card) 45+3'; Peglow (yellow card) 70'; Murrell (yellow card) 90+3'	Stadium: Citi Field; Attendance: 14,040; Referee: Ismail Elfath

May 9 12	Nashville SC	2–2	D.C. United	Nashville, Tennessee
21:00 EDT	Mukhtar (yellow card) 37'; Acosta (yellow card) 55'; Palacios (yellow card) 72'; Madrigal 76', 89'	Report	Munteanu 25'; Bartlett 30'; Hefti (yellow card) 45+3' (yellow-red card) 75'	Stadium: Geodis Park; Attendance: 28,384; Referee: Randy Encarnacion

May 13 13	D.C. United	1–3	Chicago Fire FC	Washington, D.C.
19:30 EDT	Baribo 41'	Report	D'Avilla (yellow card) 19'; Bamba (yellow card) 48'; Lod 62'; Cuypers 71'; Elliott (yellow card) 75'; Haile-Selassie 87'; Dean (yellow card) 89'; Gutman (yellow card) 90+6'	Stadium: Audi Field; Attendance: 11,243; Referee: Ricardo Fierro

May 16 14	D.C. United	1–1	St. Louis City SC	Washington, D.C.
19:30 EDT	Hopkins (yellow card) 60'; Hefti (yellow card) 70'; Peglow 90'; Rowles (yellow card) 90+4'	Report	F. Fall (yellow card) 28'; Wallem (yellow card) 41' (yellow-red card) 90+2'; Durkin 50'; Perez (yellow card) 59'; M. Fall (yellow card) 90+6'	Stadium: Audi Field; Attendance: 16,888; Referee: Rodrigo Albuquerque

May 23 15	D.C. United	4–4	CF Montréal	Washington, D.C.
19:30 EDT	Munteanu 28'; Stroud 31'; Baribo 51' (pen.); Servania (yellow card) 61'; Bartlett 87', (yellow card) 90+10'	Report	Escobar (yellow card) 31'; Owusu 45+1', 61', 90+4' (pen.), (yellow card) 90+10'; Ríos (yellow card) 61'; Synchuk 90+6'; Loturi (yellow card) 90+7'; Longstaff (yellow card) 90+11'	Stadium: Audi Field; Attendance: 19,215; Referee: Filip Dujic

Mid-season break for 2026 FIFA World Cup

July 22 16	Houston Dynamo FC	1–1	D.C. United	Houston, Texas
19:30 EDT	Herrera 40'; Artur (yellow card) 69'; Sviatchenko (yellow card) 90+7'	Report	Hefti (yellow card) 67'; Baribo (yellow card) 70', (goal) 78'; Dozzell (yellow card) 73'; Stroud (yellow card) 90+5'	Stadium: Shell Energy Stadium; Attendance: 17,137; Referee: Victor Rivas

July 25 17	D.C. United	2–1	Toronto FC	Washington, D.C.
19:30 EDT	Rowles 41'; Munteanu (yellow card) 53'; Baribo 90+10' (pen.)	Report	Corbeanu 76'; Osorio (yellow card) 88'	Stadium: Audi Field; Attendance: 19,250; Referee: Sergii Boiko

August 1 18	D.C. United	2–2	Nashville SC	Washington, D.C.
19:30 EDT	Baribo (yellow card) 45+3', (goal) 77'; Hefti 56'; Bartlett (yellow card) 72'	Report	Surridge 32' (pen.); Mohammed 40', (yellow card) 45+3'; Saad (yellow card) 84'	Stadium: Audi Field; Attendance: 19,215; Referee: Ricardo Montero

August 15 19	CF Montréal	1–1	D.C. United	Montréal, Quebec
19:30 EDT	Owusu 50' (pen.); Petrasso (yellow card) 63'	Report	Hopkins (yellow card) 20'; Kurokawa (yellow card) 50'; Baribo 67'	Stadium: Stade Saputo; Attendance: 15,309; Referee: Pierre-Luc Lauziere

August 19 20	D.C. United	0–3	New England Revolution	Washington, D.C.
19:30 EDT	Dozzell (yellow card) 26'	Report	Raines (yellow card) 13'; Yusuf 23', 45', 66'; Polster (yellow card) 32'	Stadium: Audi Field; Attendance: 13,848; Referee: Ricardo Fierro

August 22 21	Charlotte FC	3–1	D.C. United	Charlotte, North Carolina
19:30 EDT	Schnegg 64'; Cleary 66'; Biel 77', (yellow card) 90+4'; Smalls (yellow card) 85'	Report	Kurokawa (yellow card) 34'; Hefti (yellow card) 44'; Munteanu 55'; Peglow (yellow card) 68'	Stadium: Bank of America Stadium; Attendance: 28,257; Referee: Elijio Arreguin

August 29 22	D.C. United	0–0	Los Angeles FC	Washington, D.C.
19:30 EDT		Report		Stadium: Audi Field; Attendance: 19,365; Referee: Sergii Demianchuk

September 9 23	D.C. United	2–1	Columbus Crew	Washington, D.C.
19:30 EDT	Peglow (yellow card) 19'; Baribo 24', 37'; Rowles (yellow card) 57'; Johnson (yellow card) 90+5'	Report	Karumanchi (yellow card) 12'; Ruvalcaba (yellow card) 19'; Rodríguez 49'	Stadium: Audi Field; Attendance: 10,115; Referee: Muhammad Kaleia

September 12 24	D.C. United	0–0	Atlanta United FC	Washington, D.C.
19:30 EDT	Rowles (yellow card) 68'; Nono (yellow card) 70'; Sroud (yellow card) 71'	Report	Amaro (yellow card) 36'; Muyumba (yellow card) 62'	Stadium: Audi Field; Attendance: 14,189; Referee: Malik Badawi

September 19 25	D.C. United	1–2	Charlotte FC	Washington, D.C.
19:30 EDT	Peglow (yellow card) 3'; Bartlett 47'; Dozzell (yellow card) 57'	Report	Westwood 22', (yellow card) 82'; Schnegg (yellow card) 46'; Saint-Maximin 71'	Stadium: Audi Field; Attendance: 15,073; Referee: Armando Villarreal

September 26 26	Vancouver Whitecaps FC	3–3	D.C. United	Vancouver, British Columbia
22:30 EDT	White 25'; Caicedo 45+3'; Müller 72'	Report	Nono 16', 80'; Rowles (yellow card) 23'; Bartlett 65'	Stadium: BC Place; Attendance: 26,080; Referee: Fotis Bazakos

October 10 27	Inter Miami CF	4–0	D.C. United	Miami, Florida
19:30 EDT	Suárez 3', 39'; Messi 47', 60'	Report		Stadium: Nu Stadium; Attendance: 26,679; Referee: Lukasz Szpala

October 14 28	D.C. United	2–1	New York Red Bulls	Washington, D.C.
19:30 EDT	Baribo 5' (pen.); Bartlett (yellow card) 22' (red card) 68'; Hopkins (yellow card) 29'; Hefti 45+5'	Report	Padelford (yellow card) 19'; D. Nealis (yellow card) 67'; Choupo-Moting 71'; Donkor (yellow card) 73'	Stadium: Audi Field; Attendance: 13,319; Referee: Guido Gonzales Jr.

October 17 29	Orlando City SC	4–1	D.C. United	Orlando, Florida
19:30 EDT	Griezmann 15', 50'; Ojeda 22'; Otávio (yellow card) 38'; Pašalić 90+5'	Report	Baribo 45+2' (pen.), (yellow card) 89'; Nono (yellow card) 77'; Hopkins (yellow card) 82'	Stadium: Inter.co Stadium; Attendance: 19,661; Referee: Pierre-Luc Lauziere

October 21 30	FC Cincinnati	2–1	D.C. United	Cincinnati, Ohio
19:00 EDT	Douděra 14'; Hadebe 55'; Hagglund (yellow card) 87'; Jabbari (yellow card) 90+5'	Report	Nono 38', (yellow card) 54'; Baribo (yellow card) 88'	Stadium: TQL Stadium; Attendance: 25,513; Referee: Timothy Ford
Note: Match originally scheduled for September 5 but was postponed due to inclement weather.

October 24 31	D.C. United	0–2	FC Cincinnati	Washington, D.C.
19:30 EDT	Baribo (yellow card) 34'	Report	Nwobodo (yellow card) 24'; Evander 35'; Barlow (yellow card) 38', (goal) 58'	Stadium: Audi Field; Attendance: 10,046; Referee: Jon Freemon

October 28 32	Toronto FC	2–1	D.C. United	Toronto, Ontario
19:30 EDT	Dorsch (yellow card) 33'; Sallói (yellow card) 49'; Osorio 64'; Pereira (yellow card) 84'; Sargent 86'	Report	Dozzell 29'; Rowles (yellow card) 50'; Nono (yellow card) 58'; Stroud (yellow card) 60'	Stadium: BMO Field; Attendance: 16,845; Referee: Alexis Da Silva

October 31 33	Columbus Crew	3–0	D.C. United	Columbus, Ohio
13:00 EDT	Zawadzki 16'; Zaroury 41'; Nono 60' (o.g.)	Report	Kurokawa (penalty missed) 24'; Rowles (yellow card) 45+1'; Peglow (yellow card) 64'	Stadium: Lower.com Field; Attendance: 20,024; Referee: Elijio Arreguin

November 7 34	D.C. United	0–1	New York City FC	Washington, D.C.
19:30 EST	Servania (yellow card) 14'	Report	Talles Magno (yellow card) 24', (goal) 87'; Raul Gustavo (yellow card) 28'	Stadium: Audi Field; Attendance: 19,215; Referee: Matthew Thompson

=== U.S. Open Cup ===
April 15 Round of 32	D.C. United (Washington, D.C.)	3–3 (a.e.t.) (5–6 p)	(Tennessee) One Knoxville SC	Washington, D.C.
19:30 EDT	Peltola 61'; Markovic (yellow card) 64', (goal) 83'; Peglow 98'	Report	Diene 75'; Krioutchenkov 78', 113'; Fernández (yellow card) 95'; Perkins (yellow card) 118'	Stadium: Audi Field; Attendance: 6,508; Referee: Matthew Corrigan
	Penalties
	Peglow (penalty scored); Kurokawa (penalty scored); Hefti (penalty scored); Murrell (penalty scored); Peltola (penalty scored); Pirani (penalty missed)		(penalty scored) Krioutchenkov; (penalty scored) Rodrigues; (penalty scored) Gøling; (penalty scored) Conway; (penalty scored) Fernández; (penalty scored) Linhares

== Statistics ==
=== Appearances and goals ===
Numbers after plus-sign(+) denote appearances as a substitute.

As of September 17, 2026

No.	Pos	Nat	Player	Total		MLS		MLS Cup		U.S. Open Cup	
No.	Pos	Nat	Player	Apps	Goals	Apps	Goals	Apps	Goals	Apps	Goals
1	GK	(United States) USA	Sean Johnson	24	0	24+0	0	0+0	0	0+0	0
2	DF	(Japan) JPN	Kimito Nono	6	0	6+0	0	0+0	0	0+0	0
3	DF	(United States) USA	Lucas Bartlett	23	2	23+0	2	0+0	0	0+0	0
4	MF	(Finland) FIN	Matti Peltola	25	2	19+5	1	0+0	0	1+0	1
5	DF	(Switzerland) SUI	Silvan Hefti	23	0	22+0	0	0+0	0	0+1	0
6	DF	(Japan) JPN	Keisuke Kurokawa	25	0	24+0	0	0+0	0	1+0	0
7	FW	(Brazil) BRA	Peglow	22	2	21+0	1	0+0	0	1+0	1
8	FW	(United States) USA	Jared Stroud	18	1	4+13	1	0+0	0	0+1	0
9	FW	(Israel) ISR	Tai Baribo	19	14	18+1	14	0+0	0	0+0	0
10	MF	(Brazil) BRA	Gabriel Pirani	8	0	6+1	0	0+0	0	0+1	0
11	FW	(Romania) ROU	Louis Munteanu	21	6	15+5	6	0+0	0	1+0	0
12	DF	(United States) USA	Conner Antley	5	0	0+4	0	0+0	0	1+0	0
13	DF	(United States) USA	Sean Nealis	9	0	4+5	0	0+0	0	0+0	0
14	FW	(United States) USA	Gabriel Segal	0	0	0+0	0	0+0	0	0+0	0
15	DF	(Australia) AUS	Kye Rowles	19	1	18+0	1	0+0	0	1+0	0
17	FW	(United States) USA	Jacob Murrell	9	0	0+8	0	0+0	0	0+1	0
19	FW	(United States) USA	Hakim Karamoko	0	0	0+0	0	0+0	0	0+0	0
20	GK	(Haiti) HAI	Grant Leveille	0	0	0+0	0	0+0	0	0+0	0
22	DF	(Guatemala) GUA	Aaron Herrera	7	0	4+3	0	0+0	0	0+0	0
23	MF	(United States) USA	Brandon Servania	24	0	21+2	0	0+0	0	0+1	0
24	GK	(United States) USA	Jordan Farr	0	0	0+0	0	0+0	0	0+0	0
25	MF	(United States) USA	Jackson Hopkins	25	2	21+3	2	0+0	0	1+0	0
26	GK	(United States) USA	Alex Bono	1	0	0+0	0	0+0	0	1+0	0
27	DF	(Canada) CAN	Nikola Markovic	18	1	2+15	0	0+0	0	1+0	1
30	FW	(United States) USA	Caden Clark	7	0	0+7	0	0+0	0	0+0	0
32	FW	(United States) USA	Oscar Avilez	0	0	0+0	0	0+0	0	0+0	0
48	MF	(United States) USA	Gavin Turner	4	0	0+3	0	0+0	0	1+0	0
77	MF	(Japan) JPN	Hosei Kijima	11	0	1+9	0	0+0	0	1+0	0

=== Top scorers ===
Rank	Position	No.	Name	MLS	U.S. Open Cup	Total
1	FW	9	(Israel) Tai Baribo	16	0	16
2	FW	11	(Romania) Louis Munteanu	6	0	6
3	MF	3	(United States) Lucas Bartlett	4	0	4
4	DF	2	(Japan) Kimito Nono	3	0	3
5	MF	25	(United States) Jackson Hopkins	2	0	2
5	DF	8	(Switzerland) Silvan Hefti	2	0	2
5	FW	7	(Brazil) Peglow	1	1	2
5	MF	4	(Finland) Matti Peltola	1	1	2
9	DF	15	(Australia) Kye Rowles	1	0	1
9	MF	8	(United States) Jared Stroud	1	0	1
9	DF	21	(England) Andre Dozzell	0	1	1
9	DF	27	(Canada) Nikola Markovic	0	1	1
Total				39	3	42

- Last updated: November 1, 2026
- Source: Team Stats

=== Top assists ===
Rank	Position	No.	Name	MLS	U.S. Open Cup	Total
1	DF	6	(Japan) Keisuke Kurokawa	6	0	6
1	MF	7	(Brazil) Peglow	6	0	6
1	DF	5	(Switzerland) Silvan Hefti	5	1	6
4	FW	11	(Romania) Louis Munteanu	4	0	4
5	MF	4	(Finland) Matti Peltola	3	0	3
5	DF	23	(United States) Brandon Servania	2	1	3
7	MF	2	(United States) Kimito Nono	2	0	2
8	11 players with 1 assist					
Total				39	2	41

- Last updated: November 1, 2026
- Source: Team Stats

=== Disciplinary record ===
No.	Pos.	Nat.	Player	MLS			U.S. Open Cup			Total		
No.	Pos.	Nat.	Player	Yellow card	(yellow card) (yellow-red card)	Red card	Yellow card	(yellow card) (yellow-red card)	Red card	Yellow card	(yellow card) (yellow-red card)	Red card
1	GK	USA	Sean Johnson	0	0	0	0	0	0	0	0	0
3	DF	USA	Lucas Bartlett	4	0	0	0	0	0	4	0	0
4	DF	FIN	Matti Peltola	1	0	0	0	0	0	1	0	0
5	DF	SUI	Silvan Hefti	3	1	0	0	0	0	3	1	0
6	DF	JPN	Keisuke Kurokawa	3	0	0	0	0	0	3	0	0
7	FW	BRA	João Peglow	4	0	0	0	0	0	4	0	0
8	FW	USA	Jared Stroud	2	0	0	0	0	0	2	0	0
9	FW	ISR	Tai Baribo	1	0	0	0	0	0	1	0	0
10	MF	BRA	Gabriel Pirani	1	0	0	0	0	0	1	0	0
11	FW	ROU	Louis Munteanu	1	0	0	0	0	0	1	0	0
12	DF	USA	Conner Antley	0	0	0	0	0	0	0	0	0
13	DF	USA	Sean Nealis	0	0	0	0	0	0	0	0	0
14	FW	USA	Gabriel Segal	0	0	0	0	0	0	0	0	0
15	DF	AUS	Kye Rowles	1	0	0	0	0	0	1	0	0
17	FW	USA	Jacob Murrell	1	0	0	0	0	0	1	0	0
20	GK	HAI	Grant Leveille	0	0	0	0	0	0	0	0	0
22	DF	GUA	Aaron Herrera	1	0	0	0	0	0	1	0	0
23	MF	USA	Brandon Servania	2	0	0	0	0	0	2	0	0
24	GK	USA	Jordan Farr	0	0	0	0	0	0	0	0	0
25	MF	USA	Jackson Hopkins	2	0	0	0	0	0	2	0	0
26	MF	USA	Alex Bono	0	0	0	0	0	0	0	0	0
27	DF	CAN	Nikola Markovic	1	0	0	1	0	0	2	0	0
30	MF	USA	Caden Clark	1	0	0	0	0	0	1	0	0
32	FW	USA	Oscar Avilez	0	0	0	0	0	0	0	0	0
48	MF	USA	Gavin Turner	0	0	0	0	0	0	0	0	0
77	MF	JPN	Hosei Kijima	0	0	0	0	0	0	0	0	0

- Last updated: May 23, 2026

== Player awards ==
=== MLS Team of the Matchday ===
Week	Player(s)	Opponent(s)
1	Bench: Tai Baribo	Philadelphia Union
4	Bench: Matti Peltola	Chicago Fire FC
8	Bench: Sean Johnson	Philadelphia Union
9	XI: Tai Baribo	New York Red Bulls
10	XI: Kye Rowles	Orlando City SC
11	XI: Louis Munteanu	New York City FC
14	Bench: João Peglow	St. Louis City SC
19	Bench: Tai Baribo	Nashville SC
20	XI: Sean Johnson	CF Montréal
25	XI: Tai Baribo	Columbus Crew
28	XI: Kimito Nono	Vancouver Whitecaps FC
30	XI: Silvan Hefti	New York Red Bulls
30	Bench: Tai Baribo	New York Red Bulls
