= Colonial Cup =

Colonial Cup may refer to:

- Colonial Cup (ice hockey), the trophy for the post-season champion of the International Hockey League.
- Colonial Cup (rugby league), an international rugby league football challenge match played between the United States national rugby league team and the Canada Wolverines.
- Colonial Cup (rugby union), the second highest level of competition within Fijian rugby union.
- A horse race in Camden, South Carolina
- The D.C. United–Philadelphia Union rivalry
