= Capitals–Flyers rivalry =

National Hockey League rivalry

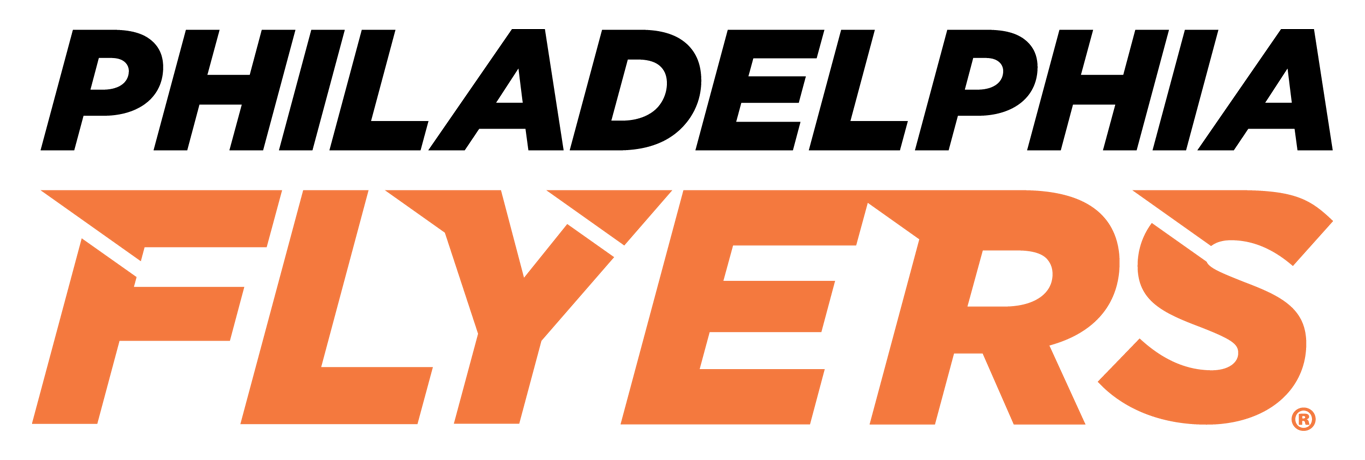
- Washington Capitals Philadelphia Flyers
- First meeting: November 9, 1974
- Latest meeting: October 28, 2026
- Next meeting: November 25, 2026

Statistics
- Total meetings: 281
- All-time series: 140–111–19–11 (PHI)
- Regular season series: 126–95–19–11 (PHI)
- Postseason results: 16–14 (WSH)
- Largest victory: PHI 11–2 WSH; April 1, 1976
- Longest win streak: PHI W6 (3 times); WSH W6 (2 times)
- Current win streak: WSH W2

Postseason history
- 1984 division semifinals: Capitals won, 3–0; 1988 division semifinals: Capitals won, 4–3; 1989 division semifinals: Flyers won, 4–2; 2008 conference quarterfinals: Flyers won, 4–3; 2016 first round: Capitals won, 4–2; 2020 round-robin: Flyers won game, 3–1

The Capitals–Flyers rivalry is a National Hockey League (NHL) rivalry between the Washington Capitals and Philadelphia Flyers. Both teams compete in the Eastern Conference's Metropolitan Division. The two teams have been rivals since the Capitals' inception in the 1974–75 season, but became most intense in the 1980s when the Capitals joined the Patrick Division. After years of quiet matchups throughout 1990s and early 2000s, the rivalry was renewed in mid-2000s and continued to grow until 2020s with both teams being equally competitive resulting in two playoff series in 2008 and 2016.

== History ==
=== 1980s ===
Due to the proximity of each team (124 miles from Philadelphia to Washington via Interstate 95), the Flyers and Capitals are natural rivals. It was common for the Capital Centre, where the Capitals played, to be filled with many Flyers fans during the meetings. This led to an intense hatred for Capitals fans, and became even more intense when they joined the Flyers in the Patrick Division. After struggling for close to a decade, the Capitals finally made the playoffs in 1983, but did not meet the Flyers until the next season. The Capitals, then led by Mike Gartner and Rod Langway, got their first playoff series win in franchise history by defeating the Flyers in the 1984 Patrick Division semifinals 3–0 in a best-of-five. This stunning sweep also marked the end of two legendary Flyers careers, Bobby Clarke and Bill Barber.

During the 1987–88 season, the rivalry became intense. With both teams set to play each other in the first round of the playoffs, the two teams met in a regular season game on the final day of the regular season (April 3, 1988). The game decided home-ice advantage during that first round match-up for which the game finished 2–2, with Capitals' defenseman Garry Galley scored two goals. Both teams finished with 85 points and 38 wins, but Washington earned the home-ice advantage by winning four of the six games between the teams (minus the extra game at the Spectrum). The two teams met again in the 1988 Patrick Division semifinals. This time, the Flyers took a 3–1 lead, only to have the Capitals come back and force a game seven. Both teams sent the game into overtime, and Capitals forward Dale Hunter won it for the Capitals, making it one of the greatest playoff memories in team history.

The Flyers got their revenge the following season in 1989, as the Flyers won the series 4–2. The series is perhaps best remembered for a historical feat committed by Flyers goaltender Ron Hextall. Hextall became the first NHL goaltender to score a goal in the Stanley Cup playoffs, by actually shooting the puck into the empty net. Hextall was also the first to do that feat in the regular season, having done it the year before.

=== 1990s ===
Perhaps the most notable moment of the rivalry in the 1990s was of a fight filled game at the Capital Centre. On February 10, 1991, the Flyers and Capitals faced off in one of the most violent games between the two teams. The first period was fight filled, but the most notable moment happened in the third period with the Capitals leading big. Capitals forward Dale Hunter laid a vicious elbow to the face of Flyers defenseman Gord Murphy, which sent Flyers head coach Paul Holmgren into a frenzy, as he banged a stick against the plexiglass that separates the team benches and got in a shouting match with Capital head coach Terry Murray and enforcer Alan May. The Flyers later responded with enforcer Craig Berube crushing Capitals goaltender Don Beaupré behind the net. This led to another brawl and many fines for both teams. Each team was fined $5,000 and Paul Holmgren was fine $1,000 for his actions. Dale Hunter was suspended four games for his hit on Gord Murphy.

Another notable moment was of another brawl, this time in The Spectrum. Flyers goaltender Ron Hextall and Capitals forward Rob Pearson got into a notable scrum in February 1995 but was the last notable moment between the two teams for many seasons.

The rivalry grew dormant throughout the rest of the decade, as the two teams did not meet in the playoffs in the newly constructed Atlantic Division. With the 1998–99 realignment moving the Capitals into the Southeast Division, the rivalry grew even more dormant, especially as the Capitals struggled following their playoff run to the 1998 Stanley Cup Final ended in a sweep against the Detroit Red Wings, just as Flyers season ended the year before.

=== 2000s ===
With the arrival of the Capitals new, young star Alexander Ovechkin, this led to a rebirth of the intensity between the two teams. After 19 seasons, the two teams finally met again in the 2008 conference quarterfinals. Capitals star Alex Ovechkin made an impact early, as he scored the game-winning goal in game one. The Flyers won the next three games, with game four being won by Flyers forward Mike Knuble in double-overtime. Reminiscent of their 1988 playoff series, the Capitals forced a game seven back in Washington, D.C., on April 22, which included overcoming an early 2–0 deficit in Philadelphia in game six. This time, however, the Flyers won after Flyers forward Joffrey Lupul scored the game and series winning goal for Philadelphia in overtime on the power play.

=== 2010s ===
The rivalry became its most intense since the 1980s, especially during the 2013–14 season. The Flyers were off to a miserable start to the season, and would face the Capitals on November 1, 2013. The Capitals crushed the Flyers 7–0 in Philadelphia, with Flyers fans chanting for general manager Paul Holmgren to be fired. However, the most notable moment of the game was the line-brawl during the third period. Flyers forward Wayne Simmonds dished out a huge hit on Capitals defenseman Steven Oleksy, which led to Simmonds dropping the gloves with the Capitals Tom Wilson, leading to a brawl. Flyers goaltender Ray Emery joined in and fought Capitals goaltender Braden Holtby, who was an unwitting combatant. Emery was given two minutes for instigating, two for leaving the crease, five for fighting, and a ten-minute misconduct. Despite the controversy surrounding the brawl, the Flyers cited the game as a rally cry, and made the playoffs, despite the slow start to the season.

Later that season, on March 5, 2014, the two teams would engage in another fight filled game. This time in an eventual 6–4 Flyers win, the brawl started early as Flyers defenseman Luke Schenn checked Capitals forward Ryan Stoa into the boards, which led to a fight between Schenn and Tom Wilson. At the same time, the Flyers Vincent Lecavalier and Capitals John Erskine fought, as did Wayne Simmonds and the Capitals Connor Carrick. The brawl, coincidentally, occurred on the 10-year anniversary of the famous Flyers brawl with the Ottawa Senators.

After storming to make the playoffs, both teams faced off in the 2016 Eastern Conference first round. The Capitals were the Presidents' Trophy winners and were heavily favored. The Capitals took a 3–0 series lead, but the Flyers extended it to game six, thanks to a 44-save performance by goaltender (and former Capital) Michal Neuvirth. The Flyers only had 11 shots during the game, the fewest in franchise history for a playoff game. The Capitals won game six, however, to win the series 4–2.

== See also ==
- List of NHL rivalries
- Commanders–Eagles rivalry
- United–Union rivalry
