= Kimito Nono =

Japanese footballer (born 2002)

Kimito Nono 濃野 公人

Personal information
- Date of birth: 26 March 2002 (age 24)
- Place of birth: Ibaraki, Osaka, Japan
- Height: 1.79 m (5 ft 10 in)
- Position: Right back

Team information
- Current team: D.C. United
- Number: 2

Youth career
- Osaka Dreams
- Valentia FC
- –2016: Sagan Tosu
- 2017–2019: Ohzu High School

College career
Years	Team	Apps	(Gls)
2020–2023	Kwansei Gakuin University	55	(9)

Senior career*
Years	Team	Apps	(Gls)
2024–2026	Kashima Antlers	77	(12)
2026–	D.C. United	13	(3)
- * Club domestic league appearances and goals as of 10:35, 18 October 2026 (UTC)

Kimito Nono (濃野 公人, Nōno Kimito; born 26 March 2002) is a Japanese professional footballer who plays as a right back for Major League Soccer club D.C. United.

== Early life ==
Nono was born in Ibaraki, Osaka and his father would often take him to watch Gamba Osaka matches. Whilst at elementary school, he moved to Chikushino, Fukuoka and joined Sagan Tosu U-15.

== Youth career ==
Despite playing for Sagan Tosu's U-15 side, Nono decided to attend Ohzu High School to continue his footballing journey rather than move up to Tosu's U-18s. At this time, his position was as a forward. In 2019, he scored six goals in 17 appearances in the Prince Takamado Trophy JFA U-18 Football League.

Nono received an offer from Kwansei Gakuin University, which he accepted. In his first year, he moved first to right-midfield, before settling in the right-back position at the start of his second year. From then on, Nono was a regular player for the university team. The team finished as winners of the JUFA Kansai League in both 2021 and 2022. At the end of his time at the university, he had 64 appearances and scored 10 goals across all competitions.

== Club career ==
=== Kashima Antlers ===
Nono received two offers from J1 League clubs. In June 2023, it was announced that he would be joining J1 League team Kashima Antlers for the 2024 J1 League season. Nono made his debut for the club on the opening game of the season in a 3–0 league victory over Nagoya Grampus. He became the first college graduate rookie since 1993 to be named in the starting lineup of the opening game for a Kashima side. In April 2024, he scored his first goal for the club, an 85th-minute winner in a 1–0 league win over Kyoto Sanga. In his first appearance in the J.League Cup, Nono was sent off in extra time in a 2–1 victory over Vanraure Hachinohe. After scoring two goals in a 3–2 defeat to Shonan Bellmare on 28 September 2024, he picked up a knee injury which ruled him out for the remainder of the season. Despite missing the last two months of the season, his nine goals in thirty-one appearances meant Nono was selected in the 2024 J.League Best XI. He was the first university graduate rookie since Kaoru Mitoma in 2020 to be inducted into the Best XI.

Ahead of the 2025 season, Nono stated he wanted to continue his goalscoring form and was aiming for a double digit goal tally. Nono retained his place as the first-choice right-back until he picked up an injury in April following a J.League Cup match against Renofa Yamaguchi, which ruled him out for two months. By June, he was starting to be eased back into the starting XI and by July he was once again starting most games at right-back. He finished the season making 32 appearances across all competitions, scoring 2 goals and helping Kashima win their first league title since 2016.

In 2026, Nono played almost every game for Kashima in the J1 100 Year Vision League and his performances gained him a place in the Regional Round East Best Eleven He scored 2 goals in 19 appearances as Kashima finished runners-up in the competition.

=== D.C. United ===
In July 2026, it was announced that Nono would be joining MLS club D.C. United on a three-year contract, occupying one of their international roster slots. There he would be linking up with former Kashima Antlers manager René Weiler.

== Career statistics ==
=== Club ===
As of 31 July 2026

Appearances and goals by club, season and competition
Club	Season	League			National cup (Note: Includes Emperors Cup)		League cup (Note: Includes J.League Cup)		Total	
Club	Season	Division	Apps	Goals	Apps	Goals	Apps	Goals	Apps	Goals
Kashima Antlers	2024	J1 League	31	9	4	0	1	0	36	9
Kashima Antlers	2025	J1 League	27	1	3	0	2	1	32	2
Kashima Antlers	2026	J1 (100)	19	2	0	0	0	0	19	2
Kashima Antlers	Total		77	12	7	0	3	1	87	13
D.C. United	2026	MLS	0	0	0	0	0	0	0	0
Career total			77	12	7	0	3	1	87	13

== Honours ==
=== Club ===
Kashima Antlers

- J1 League: 2025

=== Individual ===
- J.League Best XI: 2024
- J1 100 Year Vision League Regional Round East Best Eleven: 2026
