= Commanders–Eagles rivalry =

National Football League rivalry

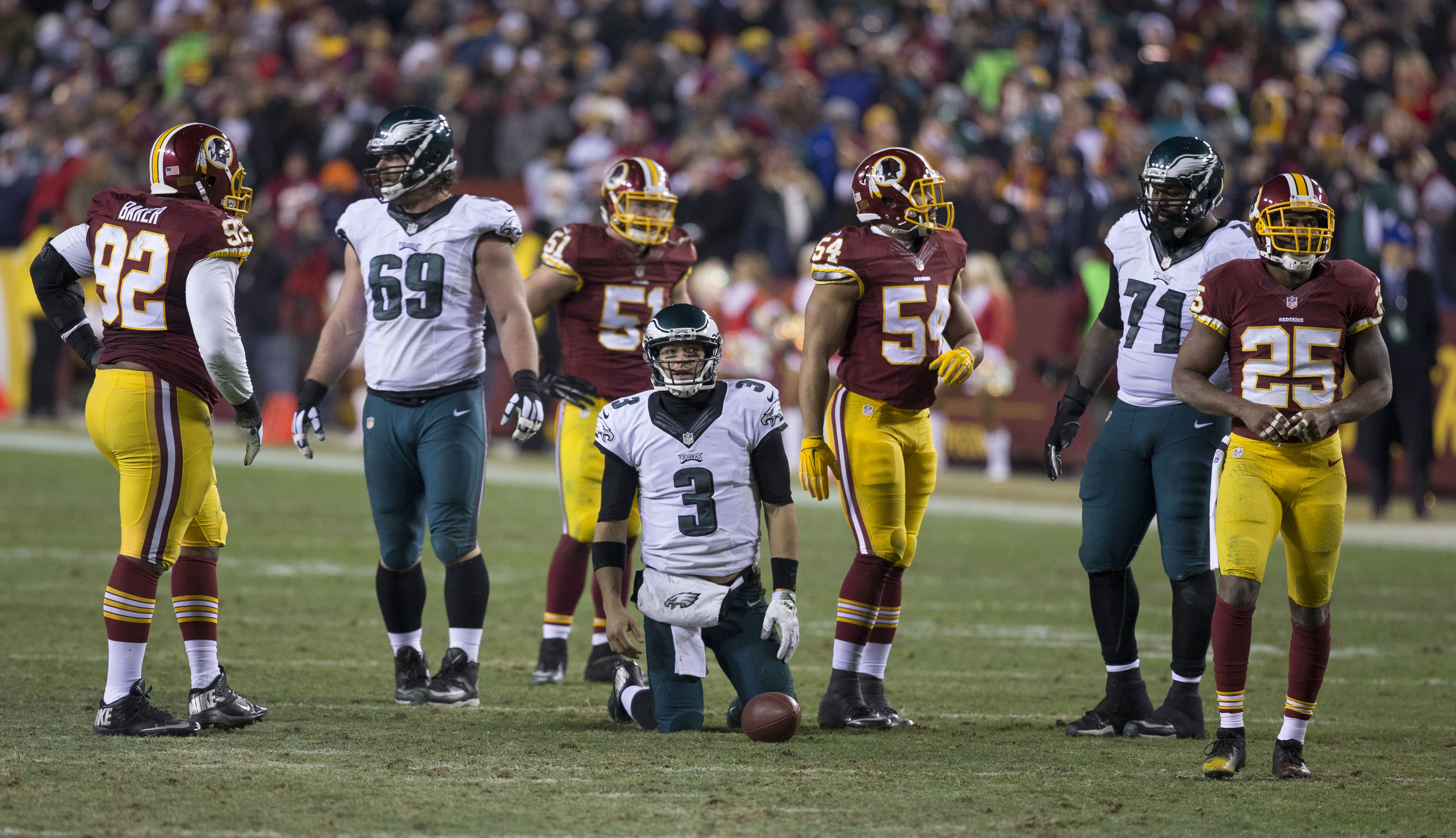
- Redskins and Eagles face off during the 2014 season.

- Washington Commanders Philadelphia Eagles
- Location: Washington, D.C., Philadelphia
- First meeting: October 21, 1934; Redskins 6, Eagles 0
- Latest meeting: November 1, 2026; Commanders 27, Eagles 10
- Next meeting: 2027
- Stadiums: Commanders: Northwest Stadium; Eagles: Lincoln Financial Field

Statistics
- Total meetings: 187
- All-time series: Commanders: 92–89–6
- Regular season series: Commanders: 91–88–6
- Postseason results: Tie: 1–1
- Largest victory: Commanders: 42–7 (1957); Eagles: 45–0 (1948)
- Most points scored: Commanders: 42 (1947), (1957); Eagles: 59 (2010)
- Longest win streak: Commanders: 11 (1938–1942); Eagles: 8 (1947–1950, 1992–1996)
- Current win streak: Commanders: 1 (2026–present)

Post–season history
- 1990 NFC Wild Card: Redskins won: 20–6; 2024 NFC Championship: Eagles won: 55–23

The Commanders–Eagles rivalry, formerly known as the Eagles–Redskins rivalry, is a National Football League (NFL) rivalry between the Washington Commanders and Philadelphia Eagles.

The rivalry is one of the most heated rivalries in the NFL, and has featured some memorable moments in NFL history. The rivalry is most historically notable from the "Body Bag Game", where the Eagles injured nine Redskins players in a game in 1990. In 2010, the Eagles scored 59 points in three quarters against the Redskins in a game known as the Monday Night Massacre.

The Commanders lead the overall series, 92–89–6. The two teams have met twice in the playoffs, with Washington winning the first meeting in the 1990 Wild Card round, and Philadelphia winning in the 2024 NFC Championship Game.

== Background ==
The Commanders were originally founded as the Boston Braves in 1932 by George Preston Marshall. After one year, the Braves changed their name to the Redskins in the 1933 season. Following the success of the 1932 NFL Playoff Game, the league divided its teams into two divisions, with the Redskins being placed in the Eastern division.

The Eagles were founded in 1933 by Bert Bell and Lud Wray. They were placed in the Eastern division, becoming divisional rivals with the Redskins. However, it would not be until the next season when the Eagles and Redskins faced off for the first time.

== Season-by-season results ==
Philadelphia Eagles vs. Boston/Washington Redskins/Football Team/Commanders Season-by-Season Results
1930s (Redskins, 9–2)

Season	Season series	at Philadelphia Eagles	at Boston/Washington Redskins	Overall series	Notes
1934	Redskins 2–0	Redskins; 14–7	Redskins; 6–0	Redskins; 2–0	Redskins and Eagles join the NFL as an expansion team during the 1932 and 1933 seasons, respectively. Both are placed in the NFL Eastern Division, resulting in two meetings annually since the 1934 season.
1935	Eagles 1–0	Canceled (snow and rain)	Eagles; 7–6	Redskins; 2–1	Due to bad weather (rain and snow), game scheduled in Philadelphia was postponed and later canceled, making this the only season both teams did not meet twice in the regular season.
1936	Redskins 2–0	Redskins; 26–3	Redskins; 17–7	Redskins; 4–1	Last season Redskins played as a Boston-based team. Redskins lose 1936 NFL Championship.
1937	Tie 1–1	Redskins; 10–7	Eagles; 14–0	Redskins; 5–2	Redskins relocate to Washington, D.C.. Eagles' win snapped their 16-game winless streak. Redskins win 1937 NFL Championship.
1938	Redskins 2–0	Redskins; 26–23	Redskins; 20–14	Redskins; 7–2	
1939	Redskins 2–0	Redskins; 7–0	Redskins; 7–6	Redskins; 9–2	

1940s (Eagles, 10–8–2)

Season	Season series	at Philadelphia Eagles	at Washington Redskins	Overall series	Notes
1940	Redskins 2–0	Redskins; 34–17	Redskins; 13–6	Redskins; 11–2	Eagles move to Shibe Park. Redskins lose 1940 NFL Championship.
1941	Redskins 2–0	Redskins; 21–17	Redskins; 20–14	Redskins; 13–2	
1942	Redskins 2–0	Redskins; 14–10	Redskins; 30–27	Redskins; 15–2	Starting with their win in Philadelphia, Redskins go on a 14-game winning streak and a 17-game unbeaten streak. Redskins win 11 straight meetings (1937-1942) and eight straight away meetings (1934–1942). Redskins win 1942 NFL Championship.
1943	"Steagles" 1–0–1	Tie; 14–14	"Steagles"; 27–14	Redskins; 15–3–1	Eagles and Pittsburgh Steelers merged for the 1943 season to become the "Steagles," as both teams lost many players to military service during World War II. The tie result snapped the Redskins' 14-game winning streak. Steagles' win snapped the Redskins' 17-game unbeaten streak. Redskins lose 1943 NFL Championship.
1944	Eagles 1–0–1	Tie; 31–31	Eagles; 37–7	Redskins; 15–4–2	
1945	Tie 1–1	Eagles; 16–0	Redskins; 24–14	Redskins; 16–5–2	Eagles record their first home win against the Redskins. Redskins lose 1945 NFL Championship.
1946	Tie 1–1	Redskins; 27–10	Eagles; 28–24	Redskins; 17–6–2	In Washington, Eagles overcame a 24–0 second half deficit. The 24-point comeback set a new Eagles franchise record for largest comeback while the 24-point blown lead set a new Redskins franchise record for largest blown lead.
1947	Eagles 2–0	Eagles; 45–42	Eagles; 38–14	Redskins; 17–8–2	In Philadelphia, Redskins score their most points in a game against the Eagles despite the loss. Eagles record their first season series sweep against the Redskins. Eagles lose 1947 NFL Championship.
1948	Eagles 2–0	Eagles; 42–21	Eagles; 45–0	Redskins; 17–10–2	In Washington, Eagles record their largest victory against the Redskins with a 45–point differential. Eagles win 1948 NFL Championship.
1949	Eagles 2–0	Eagles; 49–14	Eagles; 44–21	Redskins; 17–12–2	Eagles win 1949 NFL Championship.

1950s (Eagles, 10–9–1)

Season	Season series	at Philadelphia Eagles	at Washington Redskins	Overall series	Notes
1950	Eagles 2–0	Eagles; 35–3	Eagles; 33–0	Redskins; 17–14–2	As a result of the AAFC–NFL merger, the Eagles and Redskins are placed in the NFL American Conference (later renamed the NFL Eastern Conference in the 1953 season. Eagles win eight straight meetings (1947–1950).
1951	Tie 1–1	Redskins; 27–23	Eagles; 35–21	Redskins; 18–15–2	
1952	Tie 1–1	Eagles; 38–20	Redskins; 27–21	Redskins; 19–16–2	
1953	Redskins 1–0–1	Tie; 21–21	Redskins; 10–0	Redskins; 20–16–3	
1954	Eagles 2–0	Eagles; 41–33	Eagles; 49–21	Redskins; 20–18–3	
1955	Redskins 2–0	Redskins; 31–30	Redskins; 34–21	Redskins; 22–18–3	In Philadelphia, Redskins overcame a 16–0 second half deficit. Redskins' first season series sweep against the Eagles since the 1942 season.
1956	Tie 1–1	Eagles; 13–9	Redskins; 19–17	Redskins; 23–19–3	
1957	Tie 1–1	Eagles; 21–12	Redskins; 42–7	Redskins; 24–20–3	In Washington, Redskins record their largest victory against the Eagles with a 35–point differential and tie their most points in a game against the Eagles (1947).
1958	Redskins 2–0	Redskins; 24–14	Redskins; 20–0	Redskins; 26–20–3	Eagles move to Franklin Field.
1959	Eagles 2–0	Eagles; 30–23	Eagles; 34–14	Redskins; 26–22–3	

1960s (Tie, 9–9–2)

Season	Season series	at Philadelphia Eagles	at Washington Redskins	Overall series	Notes
1960	Eagles 2–0	Eagles; 19–13	Eagles; 38–28	Redskins; 26–24–3	Eagles win 1960 NFL Championship.
1961	Eagles 2–0	Eagles; 14–7	Eagles; 27–24	Tie; 26–26–3	Redskins open D.C. Stadium (now known as Robert F. Kennedy Memorial Stadium).
1962	Tie 1–1	Redskins; 27–21	Eagles; 37–14	Tie; 27–27–3	
1963	Tie 1–1	Redskins; 13–10	Eagles; 37–24	Tie; 28–28–3	In Washington, Eagles overcame a 17–0 deficit.
1964	Redskins 2–0	Redskins; 21–10	Redskins; 35–20	Redskins; 30–28–3	
1965	Tie 1–1	Eagles; 21–14	Redskins; 23–21	Redskins; 31–29–3	
1966	Tie 1–1	Redskins; 27–13	Eagles; 37–28	Redskins; 32–30–3	
1967	Eagles 1–0–1	Eagles; 35–24	Tie; 35–35	Redskins; 32–31–4	As a result of expansion, the two eight-team divisions became two eight-team conferences split into two divisions, with the Eagles and Redskins placed in the NFL Capitol division.
1968	Redskins 2–0	Redskins; 16–10	Redskins; 17–14	Redskins; 34–31–4	
1969	Redskins 1–0–1	Redskins; 34–29	Tie; 28–28	Redskins; 35–31–5	

1970s (Redskins, 15–4–1)

Season	Season series	at Philadelphia Eagles	at Washington Redskins	Overall series	Notes
1970	Redskins 2–0	Redskins; 33–21	Redskins; 24–6	Redskins; 37–31–5	As a result of the AFL–NFL merger, the Eagles and Redskins are placed in the National Football Conference (NFC) and the NFC East.
1971	Redskins 1–0–1	Redskins; 20–13	Tie; 7–7	Redskins; 38–31–6	Eagles open Veterans Stadium.
1972	Redskins 2–0	Redskins; 23–7	Redskins; 14–0	Redskins; 40–31–6	Redskins lose Super Bowl VII.
1973	Redskins 2–0	Redskins; 28–7	Redskins; 38–20	Redskins; 42–31–6	
1974	Redskins 2–0	Redskins; 27–20	Redskins; 26–7	Redskins; 44–31–6	
1975	Eagles 2–0	Eagles; 26–10	Eagles; 26–3	Redskins; 44–33–6	Eagles' first season series sweep of the Redskins since the 1961 season.
1976	Redskins 2–0	Redskins; 20–17 (OT)	Redskins; 24–0	Redskins; 46–33–6	
1977	Redskins 2–0	Redskins; 17–14	Redskins; 23–17	Redskins; 48–33–6	
1978	Tie 1–1	Eagles; 17–10	Redskins; 35–30	Redskins; 49–34–6	
1979	Tie 1–1	Eagles; 28–17	Redskins; 17–7	Redskins; 50–35–6	

1980s (Redskins, 13–7)

Season	Season series	at Philadelphia Eagles	at Washington Redskins	Overall series	Notes
1980	Eagles 2–0	Eagles; 24–14	Eagles; 24–0	Redskins; 50–37–6	Eagles lose Super Bowl XV.
1981	Tie 1–1	Eagles; 36–13	Redskins; 15–13	Redskins; 51–38–6	
1982	Redskins 2–0	Redskins; 37–34 (OT)	Redskins; 13–9	Redskins; 53–38–6	Both games are played despite the 1982 NFL players' strike reducing the season to 9 games. In Philadelphia, Redskins overcame a 27–14 fourth quarter deficit. Redskins win Super Bowl XVII.
1983	Redskins 2–0	Redskins; 23–13	Redskins; 28–24	Redskins; 55–38–6	Redskins lose Super Bowl XVIII.
1984	Tie 1–1	Eagles; 16–10	Redskins; 20–0	Redskins; 56–39–6	Game in Washington marked the 100th meeting.
1985	Tie 1–1	Redskins; 17–12	Eagles; 19–6	Redskins; 57–40–6	
1986	Redskins 2–0	Redskins; 21–14	Redskins; 41–14	Redskins; 59–40–6	In Philadelphia, Redskins overcame a 14–0 deficit.
1987	Tie 1–1	Eagles; 31–27	Redskins; 34–24	Redskins; 60–41–6	Redskins win Super Bowl XXII.
1988	Redskins 2–0	Redskins; 20–19	Redskins; 17–10	Redskins; 62–41–6	
1989	Tie 1–1	Redskins; 10–3	Eagles; 42–37	Redskins; 63–42–6	In Washington, Eagles overcame a 27–7 deficit and with the Redskins up 37–35 with just over a minute left on the Eagles' 23-yard line, the Eagles recovered a fumble and scored the game-winning touchdown.

1990s (Eagles, 13–8)

Season	Season series	at Philadelphia Eagles	at Washington Redskins	Overall series	Notes
1990	Tie 1–1	Eagles; 28–14	Redskins; 13–7	Redskins; 64–43–6	Game in Philadelphia became known as the "Body Bag Game" after Eagles' head coach Buddy Ryan warned reporters before the game that "they'll have to be carted off in body bags". Nine Redskins players left the game with injuries, prompting an Eagles player to shout, "Do you guys need any more body bags?" Both teams finished with 10–6 records, but the Eagles clinched the better playoff seed based on a better division record, setting up their first playoff meeting at Philadelphia.
1990 Playoffs	Redskins 1–0	Redskins; 20–6		Redskins; 65–43–6	NFC Wild Card playoffs.
1991	Tie 1–1	Eagles; 24–22	Redskins; 23–0	Redskins; 66–44–6	In Philadelphia, Eagles overcame a 19–7 fourth quarter deficit. Redskins win Super Bowl XXVI.
1992	Tie 1–1	Eagles; 17–13	Redskins; 16–12	Redskins; 67–45–6	Eagles clinch a playoff berth with their win.
1993	Eagles 2–0	Eagles; 34–31	Eagles; 17–14	Redskins; 67–47–6	Eagles' first season series sweep of the Redskins since the 1980 season.
1994	Eagles 2–0	Eagles; 21–17	Eagles; 31–29	Redskins; 67–49–6	
1995	Eagles 2–0	Eagles; 37–34 (OT)	Eagles; 14–7	Redskins; 67–51–6	
1996	Tie 1–1	Redskins; 26–21	Eagles; 17–14	Redskins; 68–52–6	Eagles win eight straight meetings (1992–1996).
1997	Tie 1–1	Eagles; 24–10	Redskins; 35–32	Redskins; 69–53–6	Redskins open Jack Kent Cooke Stadium (now known as Northwest Stadium).
1998	Tie 1–1	Eagles; 17–12	Redskins; 28–3	Redskins; 70–54–6	
1999	Tie 1–1	Eagles; 35–28	Redskins; 20–17 (OT)	Redskins; 71–55–6	

2000s (Eagles, 13–7)

Season	Season series	at Philadelphia Eagles	at Washington Redskins	Overall series	Notes
2000	Tie 1–1	Redskins; 17–14	Eagles; 23–20	Redskins; 72–56–6	
2001	Tie 1–1	Redskins; 13–3	Eagles; 20–6	Redskins; 73–57–6	
2002	Eagles 2–0	Eagles; 34–21	Eagles; 37–7	Redskins; 73–59–6	
2003	Eagles 2–0	Eagles; 27–25	Eagles; 31–7	Redskins; 73–61–6	Eagles open Lincoln Financial Field. In Washington, D.C., the Eagles clinch NFC East and a first-round bye with a win in Week 17.
2004	Eagles 2–0	Eagles; 28–6	Eagles; 17–14	Redskins; 73–63–6	Eagles lose Super Bowl XXXIX.
2005	Redskins 2–0	Redskins; 31–20	Redskins; 17–10	Redskins; 75–63–6	In Philadelphia, Redskins clinch a playoff berth with their win. Redskins' first season sweep of Eagles since the 1988 season.
2006	Eagles 2–0	Eagles; 27–3	Eagles; 21–19	Redskins; 75–65–6	
2007	Tie 1–1	Redskins; 20–12	Eagles; 33–25	Redskins; 76–66–6	
2008	Redskins 2–0	Redskins; 23–17	Redskins; 10–3	Redskins; 78–66–6	
2009	Eagles 2–0	Eagles; 27–24	Eagles; 27–17	Redskins; 78–68–6	

2010s (Eagles, 12–8)

Season	Season series	at Philadelphia Eagles	at Washington Redskins	Overall series	Notes
2010	Tie 1–1	Redskins; 17–12	Eagles; 59–28	Redskins; 79–69–6	Redskins sign former Eagles' QB Donovan McNabb. In Washington, Eagles score their most points in a game against the Redskins in a matchup dubbed the "Monday Night Massacre." Eagles also finish with 592 total yards, setting a franchise record for most yards in a game.
2011	Eagles 2–0	Eagles; 34–10	Eagles; 20–13	Redskins; 79–71–6	
2012	Redskins 2–0	Redskins; 27–20	Redskins; 31–6	Redskins; 81–71–6	
2013	Eagles 2–0	Eagles; 24–16	Eagles; 33–27	Redskins; 81–73–6	
2014	Tie 1–1	Eagles; 37–34	Redskins; 27–24	Redskins; 82–74–6	Redskins eliminate the Eagles from playoff contention with their win.
2015	Redskins 2–0	Redskins; 38–24	Redskins; 23–20	Redskins; 84–74–6	In Philadelphia, Redskins clinch the NFC East with their win, and the Eagles fire their head coach Chip Kelly the following day.
2016	Redskins 2–0	Redskins; 27–22	Redskins; 27–20	Redskins; 86–74–6	
2017	Eagles 2–0	Eagles; 34–24	Eagles; 30–17	Redskins; 86–76–6	Eagles win Super Bowl LII.
2018	Eagles 2–0	Eagles; 28–13	Eagles; 24–0	Redskins; 86–78–6	In Washington, Eagles, coupled with the Vikings' loss to the Bears, clinch a playoff berth with their win.
2019	Eagles 2–0	Eagles; 32–27	Eagles; 37–27	Redskins; 86–80–6	In Philadelphia, Eagles overcame a 17–0 deficit in their season opener. In Washington, Eagles score the game-winning touchdown with less than 30 seconds left to win.

2020s (Eagles, 9–6)

Season	Season series	at Philadelphia Eagles	at Washington Football Team/Commanders	Overall series	Notes
2020	Washington 2–0	Washington; 20–14	Washington; 27–17	Washington; 88–80–6	After decades of controversy, Washington retired the "Redskins" name and temporarily adopted the title "Washington Football Team". In Washington, Washington overcame a 17–0 deficit in their season opener. In Philadelphia, Washington clinch the NFC East with their win, becoming the third team in NFL history to win their division with a losing record.
2021	Eagles 2–0	Eagles; 27–17	Eagles; 20–16	Washington; 88–82–6	In Washington, Eagles clinch a playoff berth and eliminate Washington from playoff contention with their win.
2022	Tie 1–1	Commanders; 32–21	Eagles; 24–8	Commanders; 89–83–6	Washington Football Team adopts the "Commanders" name. Commanders give the Eagles their first loss of the season after starting 8–0. Eagles lose Super Bowl LVII.
2023	Eagles 2–0	Eagles; 34–31 (OT)	Eagles; 38–31	Commanders; 89–85–6	
2024	Tie 1–1	Eagles; 26–18	Commanders; 36–33	Commanders; 90–86–6	Commanders' win ended the Eagles' 10-game winning streak, a franchise record.
2024 Playoffs	Eagles 1–0	Eagles; 55–23		Commanders; 90–87–6	NFC Championship Game. Eagles set an NFL record for most points scored by any team in a conference championship game with 55. Eagles win Super Bowl LIX.
2025	Tie 1–1	Commanders; 24–17	Eagles; 29–18	Commanders; 91–88–6	Eagles clinched the NFC East title with the win, becoming the first NFC East team since the 2003–04 Eagles to win back-to-back division titles.
2026	Tie 1–1	Eagles; 24–22	Commanders; 27–10	Commanders; 92–89–6	

Summary of Results

Season	Season series	at Philadelphia Eagles	at Boston/Washington Redskins Washington Football Team/Commanders	Notes
Regular season	Commanders 91–88–6	Eagles 45–44–3	Commanders 47–43–3	
Postseason	Tie 1–1	Tie 1–1	no games	NFC Wild Card: 1990; NFC Championship: 2024
Regular and postseason	Commanders 92–89–6	Eagles 46–45–3	Commanders 47–43–3	Redskins/Commanders have a 2–1 record in Boston.

== Connections between the teams ==
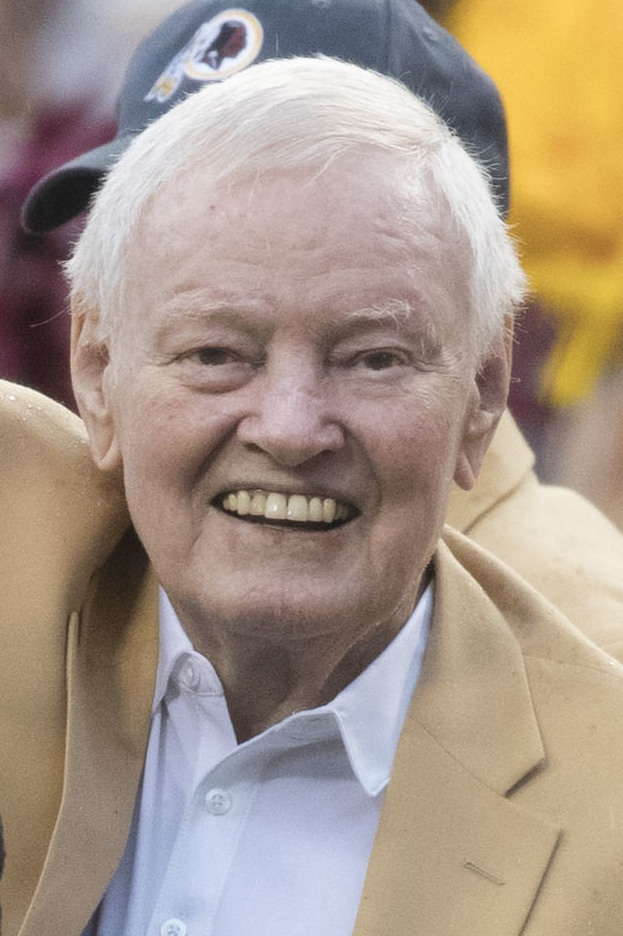
Quarterback Sonny Jurgensen, a Hall of Famer, was initially drafted by the Eagles but was subsequently traded to the Redskins. During his time with both franchises, he concluded seasons as the NFL leader in passing yards and touchdowns. He later received induction into both teams' Halls of Fame.

=== Players ===
Name	Position(s)	Commanders' tenure	Eagles' tenure
Billy Ray Barnes	Halfback	1962–1963	1957–1961
Sonny Jurgensen	Quarterback	1964–1975	1957–1963
Brian Mitchell	Running back	1990–1999	2000–2002
Donovan McNabb	Quarterback	2010	1999–2009
Rob Goode	Running back	1949–1951, 1954–1955	1955
Dominique Rodgers-Cromartie	Cornerback	2019	2011–2012
Sam Baker	Kicker/Punter/Fullback	1953, 1956–1959	1964–1969
Mark Sanchez	Quarterback	2018	2014–2015
Art Monk	Wide receiver	1980–1993	1995
Zach Ertz	Tight end	2024–present	2013–2021
Carson Wentz	Quarterback	2022	2016–2020
Casey Toohill	Defensive end	2020–2023	2020
David Akers	Placekicker	1998	1999–2010
Marcus Mariota	Quarterback	2024–present	2023
Jahan Dotson	Wide receiver	2022–2023	2024–2025
James Thrash	Wide receiver	1997–2000, 2004–2008	1997*, 2001–2003
DeSean Jackson	Wide receiver	2014–2016	2008–2013, 2019–2020
Sam Howell	Quarterback	2022-2023	2025
Jeremiah Trotter	Linebacker	2002-2003	1998-2001, 2004-2006

== See also ==
- List of NFL rivalries
- NFC East
- Capitals–Flyers rivalry
- D.C. United–Philadelphia Union rivalry
