= List of D.C. United first-round draft picks =

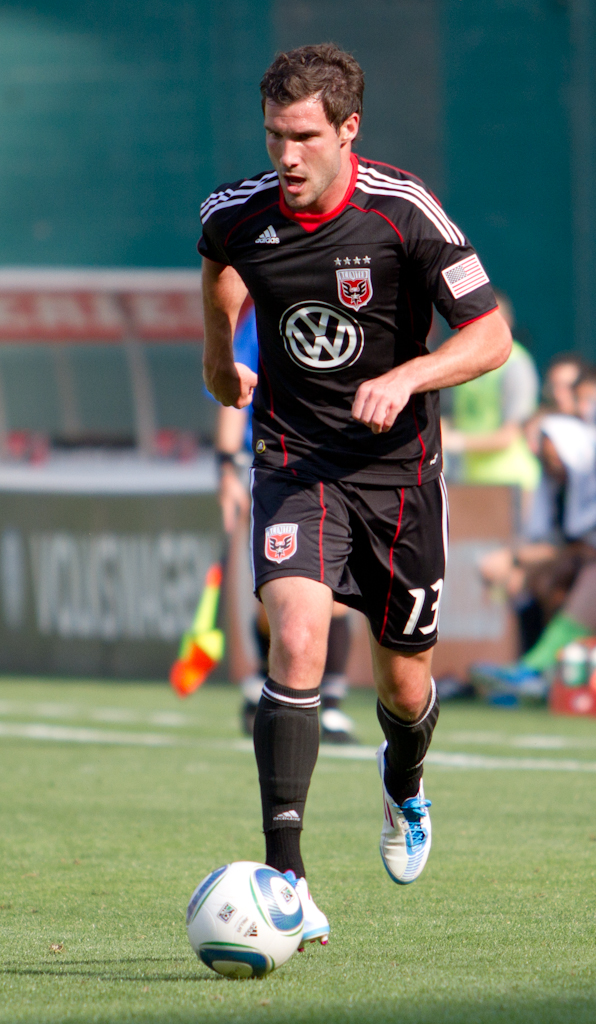
Chris Ponitus, first-round draft pick in 2009, played as a winger for D.C. United from 2009 to 2015. He was selected from the University of California at Santa Barbara.

This is a list of first-round draft picks made by D.C. United of Major League Soccer. D.C. United were an original MLS franchise, joining the league in its inaugural 1996 season.

Every year during January, each MLS franchise seeks to add new players to its roster through a collegiate draft known as the "Major League Soccer SuperDraft" which is more commonly known as the MLS Draft. Teams are ranked in inverse order based on the previous season's record, with the worst record picking first, and the second worst picking second and so on. The exception is teams that qualify for the MLS Cup Playoffs, as teams that reach further levels in the playoffs receive a later selection in the draft, with the tiebreaker being regular season record. The MLS Cup champion picks last in the draft, while the MLS Cup runner-up picks second-to-last. Clubs have the option of trading away their picks to other teams for different picks, players, allocation money, or a combination thereof. Thus, it is not uncommon for a team's actual draft pick to differ from their assigned draft pick, or for a team to have extra or no draft picks in any round due to these trades.

United have selected number one overall four times: Freddy Adu, Alecko Eskandarian, Jason Moore, and Nikola Markovic. D.C. United's first selection as an MLS team was Raúl Díaz Arce, a Salvadoran international striker who previously played for Firpo of the Primera División de Fútbol de El Salvador. The team's most-recent first-round selection was Richie Aman, an attacking midfielder from Washington.

== Player selections ==
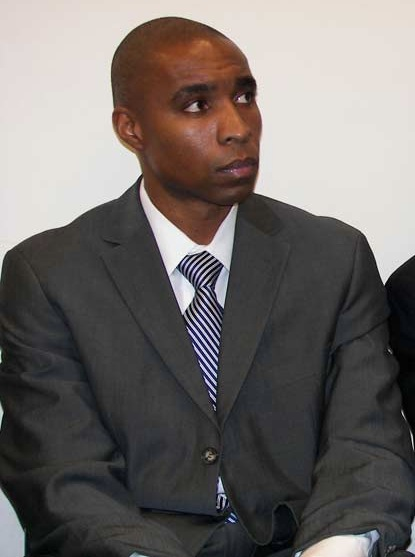
Eddie Pope, first-round draft pick in 1996, played as a defender for United from 1996 to 2002. He was elected into the National Soccer Hall of Fame in 2011.

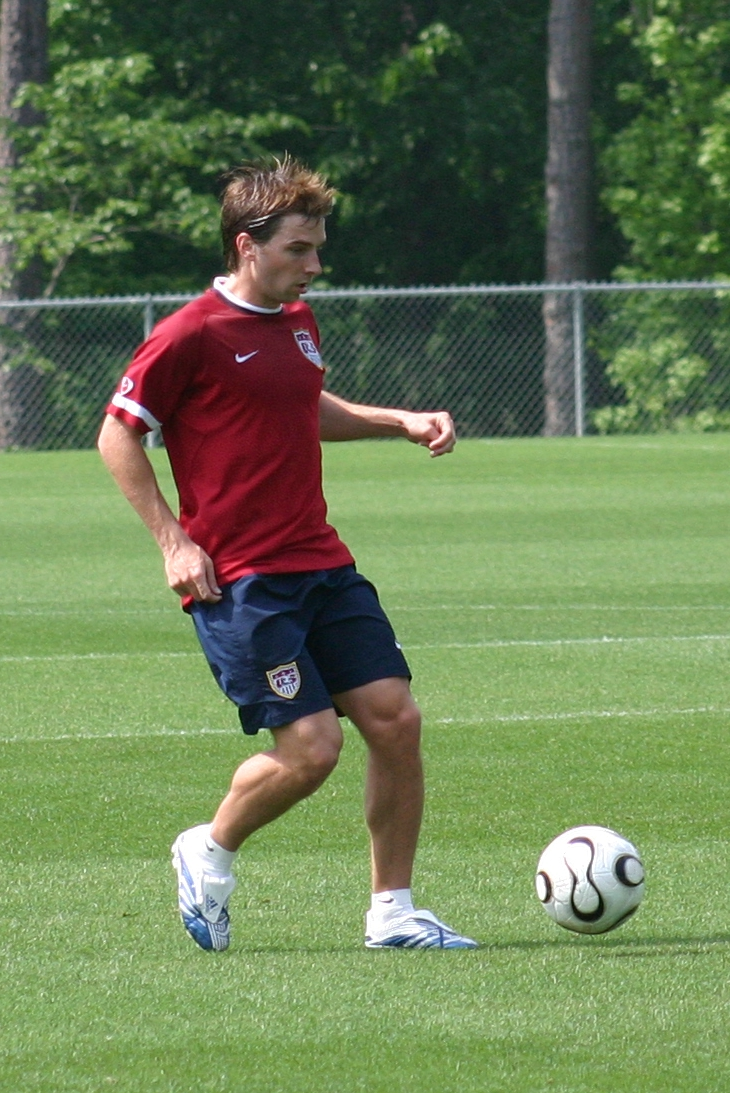
Bobby Convey, first-round draft pick in 2000, played as a midfielder for United from 2000 to 2004.

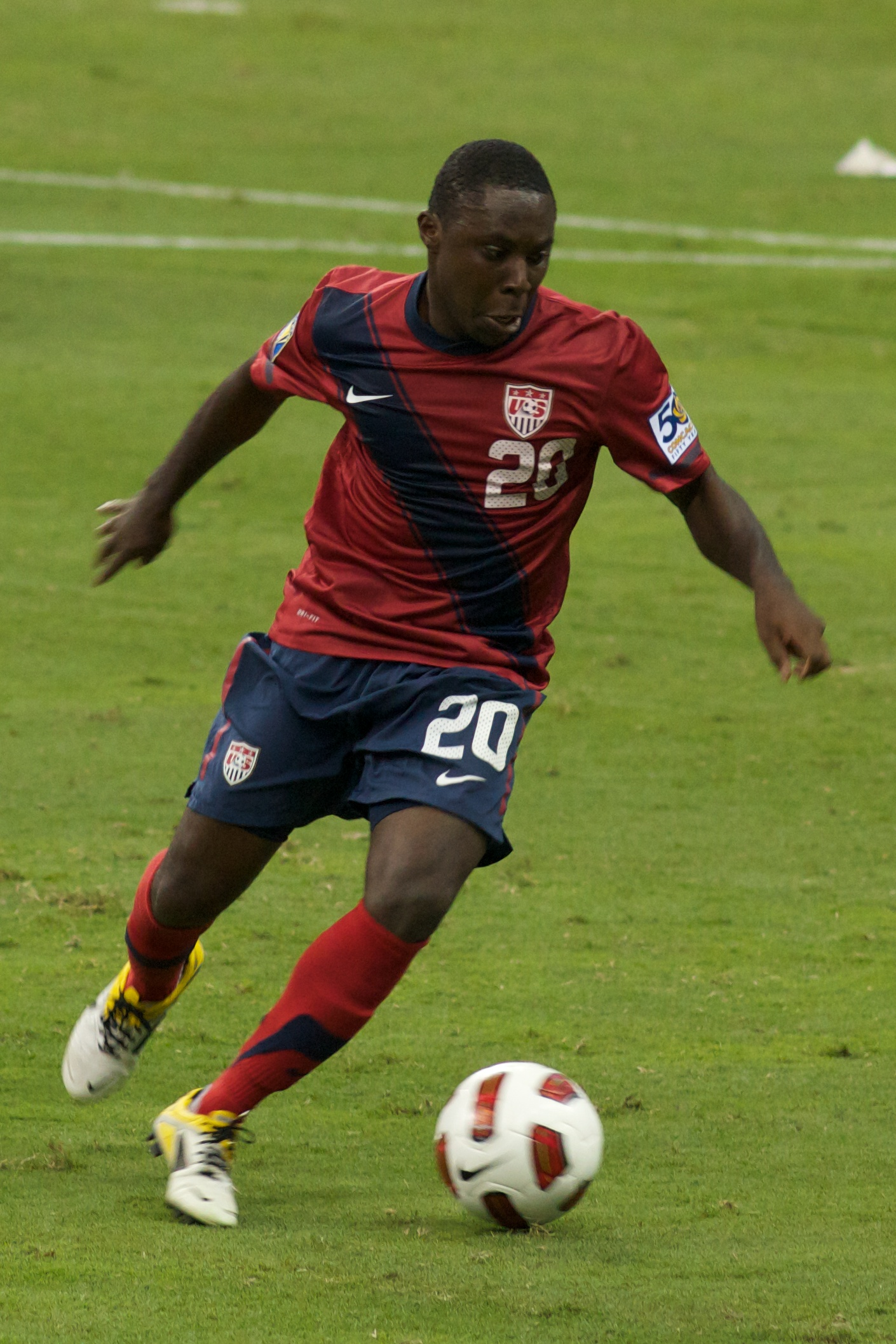
Freddy Adu, first-round draft pick in 2004, played as a midfielder for United from 2004 to 2006.

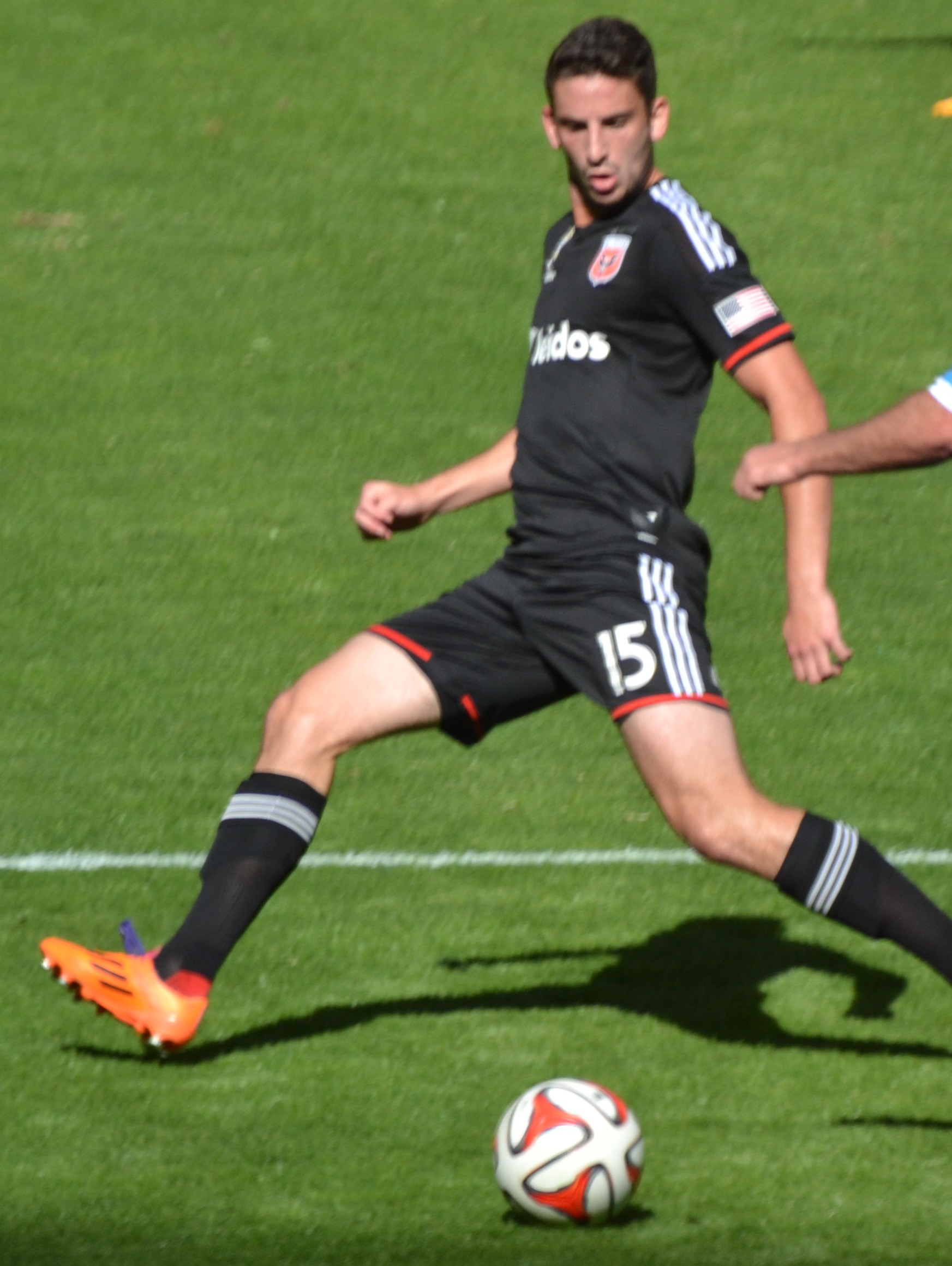
Steve Birnbaum, first-round draft pick in 2014, played as a defender for United from 2014 to 2024. He was selected from the University of California, Berkeley.

GK	Goalkeeper	DF	Defender
MF	Midfielder	FW	Forward

Selected number one overall	Enshrined in the National Soccer Hall of Fame

Draft		Player name	Position	College	Notes
Year	Pick	Player name	Position	College	Notes
Original Allocations
1996 IP	10	Raúl Díaz Arce	FW		
1996 IA	4	Jeff Agoos	DF	Virginia	
1996 IA	14	Jaime Moreno	FW		
1996 IA	24	John Harkes	MF	Virginia	
1996 IA	34	Juan Berthy Suárez	MF		
College Draft Era
1996	2	Eddie Pope	DF	North Carolina	
1997	10	Danny Care	DF	Clemson	
1998	No first-round draft pick				
1999	1	Jason Moore	MF	Virginia	
SuperDraft Era
2000	12	Bobby Convey	MF	Project-40	
2001	3	Mark Lisi	MF	Clemson	
2001	4	Ryan Nelsen	MF	Stanford	
2001	8	Santino Quaranta	MF	Project-40	
2002	8	Justin Mapp	MF	Project-40	
2002	11	Daouda Kanté	DF	FIU	
2003	1	Alecko Eskandarian	FW	Virginia	
2003	5	David Stokes	DF	North Carolina	
2004	1	Freddy Adu	MF	IMG Soccer Academy	
2005	No first-round draft pick				
2006	7	Justin Moose	MF	Wake Forest	
2007	11	Bryan Arguez	MF	IMG Soccer Academy	
2008	No first-round draft pick				
2009	6	Rodney Wallace	DF	Maryland	
2009	7	Chris Pontius	FW	UC Santa Barbara	
2010	No first-round draft pick				
2011	3	Perry Kitchen	MF	Akron	
2012	6	Nick DeLeon	MF	Louisville	
2013	17	Taylor Kemp	DF	Maryland	
2014	2	Steve Birnbaum	DF	California	
2015	17	Miguel Aguilar	FW	San Francisco	
2016	11	Julian Büscher	MF	Syracuse	
2017	12	Chris Odoi-Atsem	DF	Maryland	
2018	No first-round draft pick				
2019	14	Akeem Ward	DF	Creighton	
2020	21	Simon Lefebvre	GK	Temple	
2021	4	Kimarni Smith	FW	Clemson	
2021	5	Michael DeShields	DF	Wake Forest	
2022	No first-round draft pick				
2023	No first-round draft pick				
2024	7	Jacob Murrell	FW	Georgetown	
2025	15	Hakim Karamoko	FW	NC State	
2026	1	Nikola Marković	DF	NC State	
2026	8	Richie Aman	FW	Washington	
