= Silvan Hefti =

Swiss footballer (born 1997)

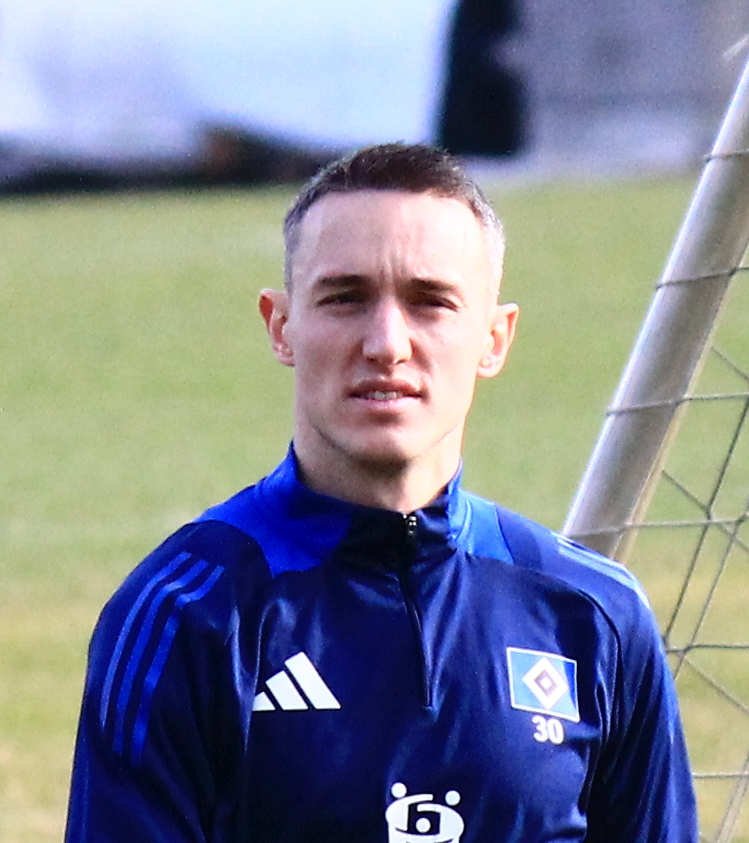
- Hefti with Hamburger SV in 2025

Personal information
- Date of birth: 25 October 1997 (age 29)
- Place of birth: Rorschach, Switzerland
- Height: 1.82 m (6 ft 0 in)
- Positions: Right-back; right midfielder

Team information
- Current team: D.C. United
- Number: 5

Youth career
- –2015: St. Gallen

Senior career*
Years	Team	Apps	(Gls)
2015–2020	St. Gallen	155	(4)
2020–2022	Young Boys	47	(1)
2022–2024	Genoa	48	(1)
2024	→ Montpellier (loan)	11	(0)
2024–2026	Hamburger SV	19	(1)
2026–	D.C. United	1	(0)

International career
2015–2016	Switzerland U19	6	(0)
2016	Switzerland U20	1	(0)
2016–2018	Switzerland U21	10	(0)
- * Club domestic league appearances and goals as of 23 May 2025

Silvan Hefti (born 25 October 1997) is a Swiss professional footballer who plays as a right-back and right midfielder for D.C. United of Major League Soccer.

== Club career ==
On 3 January 2022, Hefti joined Serie A side Genoa on a permanent deal.

On 2 January 2024, Hefti moved to Ligue 1 side Montpellier on loan with an option to buy.

On 4 August 2024, he signed with Hamburger SV in German 2. Bundesliga.

Hefti joined D.C. United on a year-and-a-half contract on 29 January 2026.

== Personal life ==
Hefti is the older brother of the footballer Nias Hefti.

== Career statistics ==
As of match played 31 January 2025

Appearances and goals by club, season and competition
Club	Season	League			Cup		Other		Total	
Club	Season	Division	Apps	Goals	Apps	Goals	Apps	Goals	Apps	Goals
St. Gallen	2015–16	Swiss Super League	23	0	2	0	—		25	0
St. Gallen	2016–17	Swiss Super League	33	0	3	0	—		36	0
St. Gallen	2017–18	Swiss Super League	30	0	4	0	—		34	0
St. Gallen	2018–19	Swiss Super League	35	1	3	0	2 (Note: Appearances in the UEFA Europa League)	1	40	2
St. Gallen	2019–20	Swiss Super League	34	3	1	0	—		35	3
St. Gallen	Total		155	4	13	0	2	1	170	5
Young Boys	2020–21	Swiss Super League	30	0	1	0	12 (Note: One appearance in the UEFA Champions League, eleven appearances in the UEFA Europa League)	0	43	0
Young Boys	2021–22	Swiss Super League	17	1	1	0	11 (Note: Appearances in the UEFA Champions League)	1	29	2
Young Boys	Total		47	1	2	0	23	1	72	2
Genoa	2021–22	Serie A	16	0	1	0	—		17	0
Genoa	2022–23	Serie B	26	1	2	0	—		28	1
Genoa	2023–24	Serie A	6	0	2	0	—		8	0
Genoa	Total		48	1	5	0	—		53	1
Montpellier (loan)	2023–24	Ligue 1	11	0	3	0	—		14	0
Montpellier (loan)	Total		11	0	3	0	—		14	0
Hamburger SV	2024–25	2. Bundesliga	19	1	1	0	—		20	1
Hamburger SV	2025–26	Bundesliga	0	0	0	0	—		0	0
Hamburger SV	Total		19	1	1	0	—		20	1
D.C. United	2026	Major League Soccer	0	0	0	0	—		0	0
D.C. United	Total		0	0	0	0	—		20	1
Career total			280	7	24	0	25	2	329	9

== Honours ==
Individual

- Swiss Super League Team of the Year: 2020–21
