= Nikola Markovic (soccer) =

Canadian soccer player (born 2004)

Personal information
- Date of birth: July 22, 2004 (age 22)
- Place of birth: Gatineau, Quebec, Canada
- Height: 6 ft 4 in (1.93 m)
- Position: Defender

Team information
- Current team: D.C. United
- Number: 27

Youth career
- FC Gatineau
- CS des Collines
- AS Gatineau

College career
Years	Team	Apps	(Gls)
2024–2025	NC State Wolfpack	39	(3)

Senior career*
Years	Team	Apps	(Gls)
2023–2024	CF Montréal U23	32	(2)
2025	Cedar Stars Rush	7	(0)
2026–	D.C. United	23	(0)
- * Club domestic league appearances and goals as of November 7, 2026

Nikola Markovic (Serbian Cyrillic: Никола Марковић born July 22, 2004) is a Canadian professional soccer player who plays as a defender for Major League Soccer club D.C. United.

== Early life ==
Markovic was born in Canada to Serbian parents. During his youth, he played soccer with FC Gatineau, CS des Collines, and AS Gatineau. When he was 12, he was offered a spot in the CF Montréal Academy, but his parents felt he was too young to move away from home, so he did not join. He eventually joined the CF Montréal U23 program in 2023, following winning gold with Team Québec at the 2022 Canada Summer Games. He spent some time training with the CF Montréal first team while in the U23 program.

== College career ==
In 2024, Markovic began attending North Carolina State University, where he played for the men's soccer team. He made his debut on September 6, 2024, starting in a 2–1 victory over the California Golden Bears. On November 21, 2024, he scored his first collegiate goal, scoring the winning goal in double overtime against the Charlotte 49ers in the first round of the 2024 NCAA Division I men's soccer tournament. At the end of his freshman season, he was named to the ACC All-Freshman Team and the ACC Academic Honor Roll. At the end of his sophomore season, he was named the ACC Defensive Player of the Year and was named to the All-ACC First Team, All-South Region First Team, and a First Team All-American. He was also named to the Best XI for the 2024 NCAA Division I men's soccer tournament and was also a semi-finalist for the MAC Hermann Trophy.

== Club career ==
In 2023, Markovic began playing at the senior level with CF Montréal U23 in Ligue1 Québec. In 2025, Markovic played with Cedar Stars Rush in USL League Two.

Ahead of the 2026 MLS SuperDraft, he signed a Generation Adidas contract with Major League Soccer, giving him a guaranteed contract for the 2026 season. At the draft, he was selected first overall by D.C. United.

Markovic made his professional debut on February 21, 2026 in a 1–0 victory against Philadelphia Union, coming on for Jackson Hopkins in the 89th minute. He made his first start for the club on April 15 in a U.S. Open Cup match against One Knoxville SC. Three days later, he made his first MLS start for the club against the Philadelphia Union.

== Career statistics ==
As of match played November 7, 2026

Appearances and goals by club, season and competition
Club	Season	League			Playoffs		National cup		League cup		Total	
Club	Season	Division	Apps	Goals	Apps	Goals	Apps	Goals	Apps	Goals	Apps	Goals
CF Montréal U23	2023	Ligue1 Québec	20	0	—		—		1	0	21	0
CF Montréal U23	2024	Ligue1 Québec	12	0	—		—		0	0	12	0
CF Montréal U23	Total		32	0	0	0	0	0	1	0	33	0
Cedar Stars Rush	2025	USL League Two	7	0	—		—		—		7	0
D.C. United	2026	Major League Soccer	23	0	0	0	1	1	0	0	24	1
Career total			62	0	0	0	1	1	1	0	64	1
