= D.C. United–Philadelphia Union rivalry =

Soccer rivalry in the United States

- Other names: Colonial Cup, Shertz–Gemmell Cup
- Location: Eastern United States
- Teams: D.C. United; Philadelphia Union
- First meeting: April 10, 2010; MLS regular season PHI 3–2 DC
- Latest meeting: April 18, 2026; MLS regular season PHI 0–0 DC
- Next meeting: April 10, 2027

Statistics
- Total meetings: 53
- Most wins: Philadelphia Union (25)
- All-time series: PHI 25–12–16 DC
- Regular season series: MLS: PHI 22–8–9 DC; Open Cup: DC 3–1–0 PHI
- Postseason results: DC 0–0–0 PHI
- Largest victory: PHI 7–0 DC; MLS regular season (July 8, 2022)

The D.C. United–Philadelphia Union rivalry or the Union–United rivalry (sometimes referred to as the Colonial Cup or the Shertz–Gemmell Cup) is a soccer rivalry between D.C. United and the Philadelphia Union, who both play in the Eastern Conference of Major League Soccer. One of the several I-95 derbies, the two clubs began playing against each other regularly since 2010, when Philadelphia Union entered MLS as an expansion team.

Philadelphia has an advantage over D.C. United with 25 overall victories and 22 regular season victories. D.C. United have the advantage in overall U.S. Open Cup victories with three. The two team's stadiums are separated by 120 miles (193 kilometers), allowing both clubs' fans to travel routinely to away matches.

In the early 2010s, the rivalry was primarily dominated by D.C. United, although in the late 2010s into the mid-2020s, the rivalry has been dominated by the Philadelphia Union.

== Background ==
Prior to MLS, there have been several sporting rivalries between Philadelphia and Washington, D.C. teams, in part due to the proximity of the cities and franchises in these cities being within the same sporting conferences. Some notable rivalries include the Capitals–Flyers rivalry in the National Hockey League, the Commanders–Eagles rivalry in the National Football League, and more recently, the Nationals–Phillies rivalry in Major League Baseball. During the days of the now-defunct North American Soccer League, there were rivalries between the Washington Diplomats and the Philadelphia Atoms and eventually the Philadelphia Fury.

Before the 1994 FIFA World Cup, the United States Soccer Federation fulfilled its promise to FIFA by aiding in the foundation of a new professional league, which would become Major League Soccer (MLS). On June 15, 1994, MLS selected Washington, D.C. out of twenty-two applicants to host one of the league's first seven franchises, with three more added before the league's launch. United would be one of the 10 charter clubs in Major League Soccer, playing their first season in 1996.

In United's early years, they quickly established themselves as one of the elite clubs in MLS winning four MLS Cup titles, four Supporters' Shield titles, two U.S. Open Cup titles, and a CONCACAF Champions Cup title, all prior to Philadelphia being awarded an expansion franchise.

While there had been talk of expanding an MLS club in Philadelphia as far back as 2001, the announcement of a formal MLS franchise in Philadelphia came in 2008 when the league announced Philadelphia as the 16th club, joining the league in 2010. The finalization of the club was the result of a $47 million package approved by Delaware County politicians and Pennsylvania governor Ed Rendell that included the cost of Subaru Park and a major urban renewal project.

Ahead of the 2010 Major League Soccer season, both clubs were pitted in the Eastern Conference of MLS and played each other twice: one home and one away leg, marking the first meetings between the Union and United.

== History ==
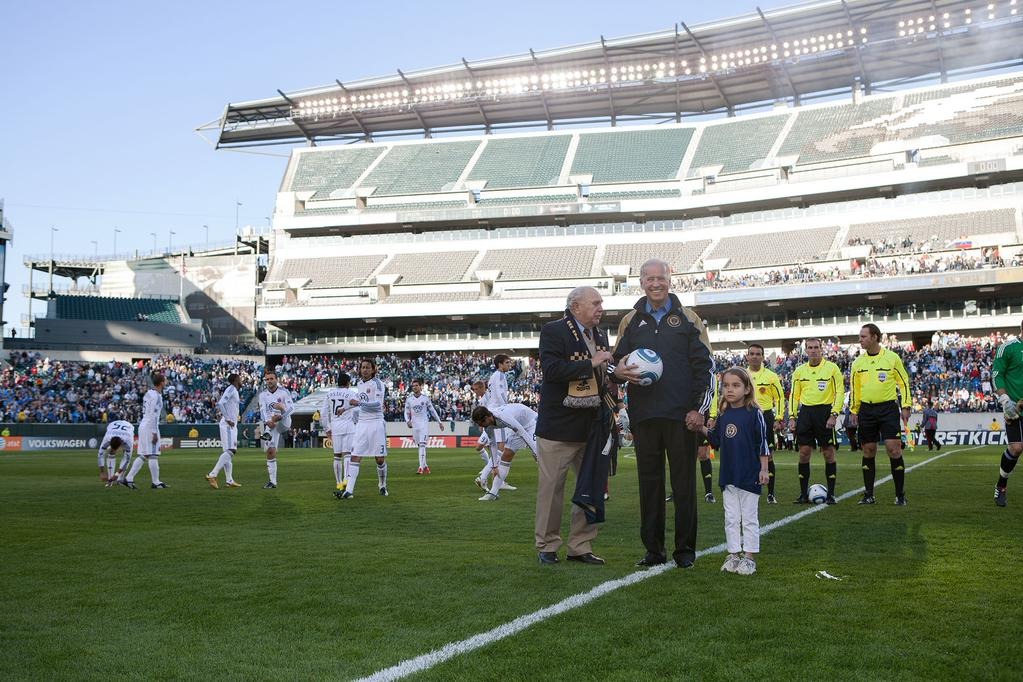
Walter Bahr and then-Vice President Joe Biden ahead of the first ever match between United and Union.

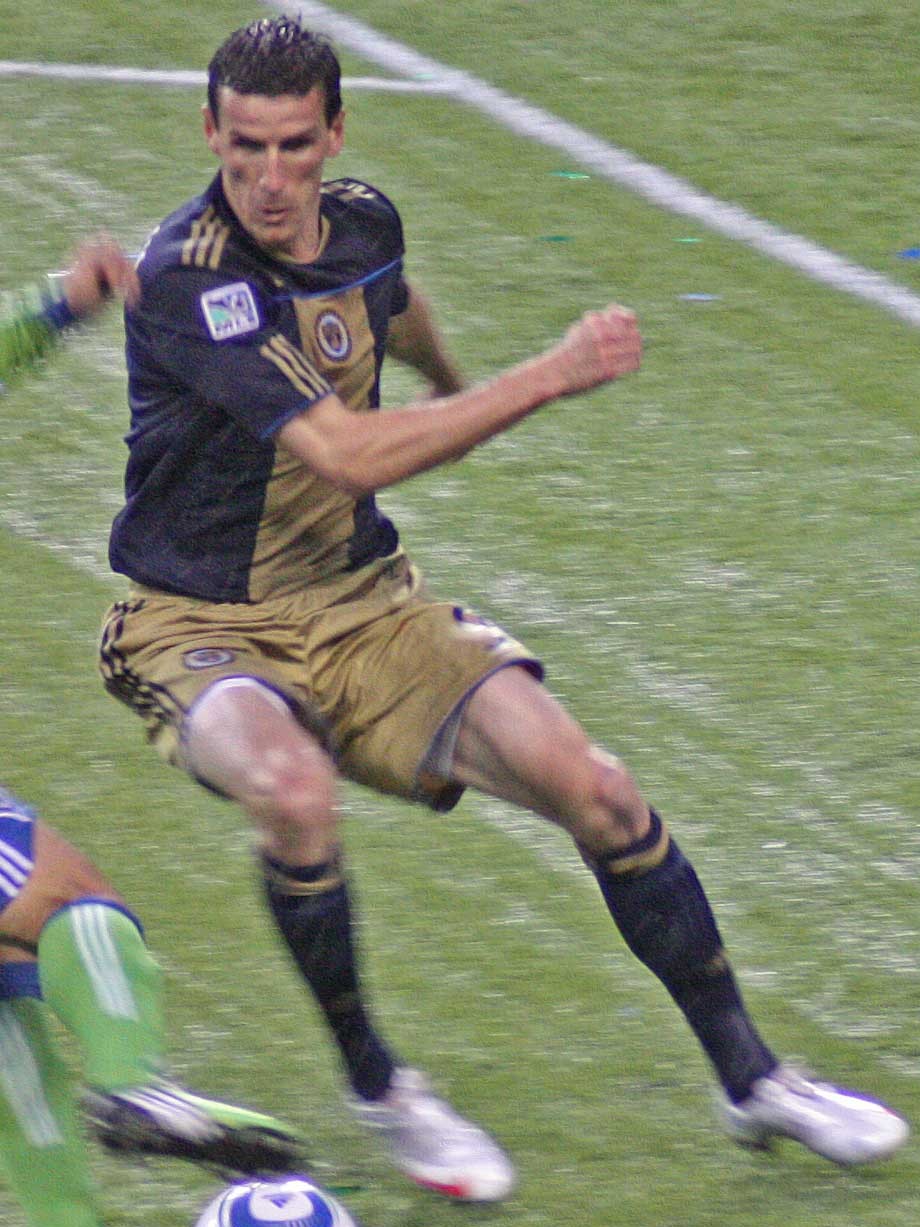
Sébastien Le Toux scored a hat-trick against D.C. United in the club's first ever meeting.

The rivalry's roots can be traced back to the Union's first-ever home match on April 10, 2010, a 3–2 victory over D.C. United in front of 35,000 fans at Lincoln Financial Field in Philadelphia. In that game, Union forward Sébastien Le Toux scored a hat-trick, etching his name in the club's history. D.C. United's Jaime Moreno also contributed with a stunning goal, which remains a highlight in the early days of the rivalry. Despite Philadelphia's first triumph, D.C. United managed to win the only other match between the two teams that season, thanks to two goals from Danny Allsopp. Tensions began to rise in 2011 when the teams met in a U.S. Open Cup play-in match. In a dramatic contest, the Union equalized despite being down a player, but D.C. United ultimately won in a penalty shootout. The emotional and heated nature of the game signaled the growing intensity between the two clubs. Later that season, the Union secured a crucial home win with a brace from Le Toux and a goal from Michael Farfan, pushing Philadelphia closer to its first playoff appearance.

By 2012, matches between D.C. United and Philadelphia Union were known for their physicality and high stakes. The rivalry escalated during another U.S. Open Cup contest, where Philadelphia triumphed after a hard-fought battle. On the league side, games between the two teams remained heated, with players from both teams being ejected during a contentious August draw at RFK Stadium. That game featured notable incidents, including a missed penalty by Dwayne De Rosario, adding to the tension between the sides. In 2013, the rivalry took on new dimensions when Philadelphia won at RFK Stadium for the first time. The Union used a quote from D.C. goalkeeper Bill Hamid guaranteeing victory as motivation, with Jack McInerney scoring twice in a 3–2 win. The rivalry continued to build as the teams clashed in both league play and the U.S. Open Cup, with each match proving highly competitive.

While the rivalry is known for its on-field intensity, there were moments of solidarity off the field. In 2014, supporters of both clubs came together for a tailgate to honor Eric Schertz, a Union fan who had died days prior to the matchup. The show of respect between the teams’ supporters contrasted sharply with the competitive nature of their encounters on the pitch. Despite this, the Union struggled against D.C. United that season, losing twice in 1-0 games. After a quieter 2014, the rivalry reignited in 2015 with several dramatic matches. Philadelphia secured a memorable stoppage-time victory at home, while also advancing in the U.S. Open Cup after defeating D.C. United despite being reduced to 10 men. D.C. United, however, managed to earn some key wins at home, including a come-from-behind victory in July 2015 after trailing by two goals.

By 2016, with Philadelphia showing signs of improvement and both teams fighting for playoff spots, the rivalry took on added significance. The Union's acquisition of former D.C. United player Chris Pontius further fueled the narrative, as Pontius switched sides in the rivalry. In 2016, MLSSoccer.com as part of its "Rivalry Week" promotion listed an online poll for fans to name the rivalry between the two clubs. The options were the I-95 Cup, the Capital Cup, the Freedom Cup or the Colonial Cup. The poll in general was panned by fans and met with heavy criticism from the media as an attempt to manufacture the rivalry. Instead, some journalists suggested naming the rivalry as the "Schertz–Gemmell Cup" in respect to the late Schertz as to Kenneth Gemmell, who died in late 2015. Ultimately, the fan poll on X, then called Twitter, resulted in the "Colonial Cup" being the winner, although the rivalry is rarely referred to as that term.

Into the late 2010s and early 2020s the rivalry intensified, marked with heavily decisive victories the Union had over United, particularly in 2022 when the Union beat United in both matches of the regular season, by an aggregate score of 13–0: winning 7–0 at home and 6–0 on the road.

== Results ==
United win Union win Draw

D.C. United vs. Philadelphia Union season-by-season results
2010s (Union, 15–14–7)

| No | Date | Venue | Home | Score | Away | Competition | Attendance | DC scorers | PHI scorers | Overall record | Ref |
|---|---|---|---|---|---|---|---|---|---|---|---|
| 1 | April 10, 2010 | Lincoln Financial Field | Union | 3–2 | United | 2010 MLS season | 34,870 | Quaranta, Moreno | Le Toux (3) | Union 1–0–0 | |
| 2 | August 22, 2010 | RFK Stadium | United | 2–0 | Union | 2010 MLS season | 12,165 | Allsopp (2) | — | Tied 1–1–0 | |
| 3 | April 6, 2011 | Maryland SoccerPlex | United | 4–2 | Union | 2011 U.S. Open Cup | 2,347 | Wolff, Woolard, Pontius, Barklage | Ruiz, Caroll | United 2–1–0 | |
| 4 | July 2, 2011 | RFK Stadium | United | 2–2 | Union | 2011 MLS season | 13,365 | Wolff, Najar | Kitchen (o.g.), Ruiz | United 2–1–1 | |
| 5 | September 29, 2011 | PPL Park | Union | 3–2 | United | 2011 MLS season | 17,963 | De Rosario, Najar | Le Toux (2), Farfan | Tied 2–2–1 | |
| 6 | June 5, 2012 | Maryland SoccerPlex | United | 1–2 | Union | 2012 U.S. Open Cup | 3,276 | Wolff | Carroll, Hoppenot | Union 3–2–1 | |
| 7 | June 16, 2012 | PPL Park | Union | 0–1 | United | 2012 MLS season | 18,876 | Pontius | — | Tied 3–3–1 | |
| 8 | August 19, 2012 | RFK Stadium | United | 1–1 | Union | 2012 MLS season | 12,312 | Okugo (o.g.) | Carroll | Tied 3–3–2 | |
| 9 | September 20, 2012 | PPL Park | Union | 0–1 | United | 2012 MLS season | 16,024 | Pajoy | — | United 4–3–2 | |
| 10 | February 16, 2013 | Hess Field | Union | 0–2 | United | 2013 WDW Pro Soccer Classic | 694 | De Rosario, Pajoy | — | United 5–3–2 | |
| 11 | February 20, 2013 | Dewey Boster Stadium | Union | 1–1 | United | Friendly | 0 | Porter | Hoffman | United 5–3–3 | |
| 12 | April 21, 2013 | RFK Stadium | United | 2–3 | Union | 2013 MLS season | 12,349 | Kitchen, Pajoy | McInerney (2), Casey | United 5–4–3 | |
| 13 | June 12, 2013 | Maryland SoccerPlex | United | 3–1 | Union | 2013 U.S. Open Cup | 2,325 | De Rosario (3) | McInerney | United 6–4–3 | |
| 14 | August 10, 2013 | PPL Park | Union | 2–0 | United | 2013 MLS season | 18,652 | — | Casey | United 6–5–3 | |
| 15 | October 12, 2013 | RFK Stadium | United | 1–1 | Union | 2013 MLS season | 11,213 | DeLeon | McInerney | United 6–5–4 | |
| 16 | May 10, 2014 | PPL Park | Union | 0–1 | United | 2014 MLS season | 18,522 | Rolfe | — | United 7–5–4 | |
| 17 | September 27, 2014 | RFK Stadium | United | 1–0 | Union | 2014 MLS season | 19,478 | Silva | — | United 8–5–4 | |
| 18 | May 17, 2015 | PPL Park | Union | 1–0 | United | 2015 MLS season | 16,853 | — | Pfeffer | United 8–6–4 | |
| 19 | May 30, 2015 | RFK Stadium | United | 2–1 | Union | 2015 MLS season | 16,284 | Pontius, Rolfe | Le Toux | United 9–6–4 | |
| 20 | July 26, 2015 | RFK Stadium | United | 3–2 | Union | 2015 MLS season | 19,125 | Saborío, DeLeon, Espíndola | Sapong, Le Toux | United 10–6–4 | |
| 21 | February 17, 2016 | Al Lang Stadium | United | 1–1 | Union | 2016 Suncoast Invitational | 0 | Espíndola | Le Toux | United 10–6–5 | |
| 22 | May 20, 2016 | Talen Energy Stadium | Union | 1–0 | United | 2016 MLS season | 17,364 | — | Marquez | United 10–7–5 | |
| 23 | July 9, 2016 | Talen Energy Stadium | Union | 3–0 | United | 2016 MLS season | 18,463 | — | Alberg, Ilsinho (2) | United 10–8–5 | |
| 24 | August 6, 2016 | RFK Stadium | United | 2–2 | Union | 2016 MLS season | 16,392 | Kemp, Birnbaum | Barnetta, Pontius | United 10–8–6 | |
| 25 | February 4, 2017 | Al Lang Stadium | United | 1–1 | Union | Friendly | 0 | Ortiz | Sapong | United 10–8–7 | |
| 26 | February 25, 2017 | Al Lang Stadium | United | 3–2 | Union | 2017 Suncoast Invitational | 1,000 | Nyarko, Jeffrey, Mullins | Onyewu, Epps | United 11–8–7 | |
| 27 | April 1, 2017 | RFK Stadium | United | 2–1 | Union | 2017 MLS season | 14,650 | Ortiz, Acosta | Sapong | United 12–8–7 | |
| 28 | May 13, 2017 | RFK Stadium | United | 0–4 | Union | 2017 MLS season | 14,576 | — | Medunjanin, Onyewu, Picault, Herbers | United 12–9–7 | |
| 29 | June 24, 2017 | Talen Energy Stadium | Union | 1–0 | United | 2017 MLS season | 17,656 | — | Pcault | United 12–10–7 | |
| 30 | February 17, 2018 | Al Lang Stadium | United | 2–1 | Union | 2018 Suncoast Invitational | 1,706 | Mattocks, Acosta | Burke | United 13–10–7 | |
| 31 | April 28, 2018 | Talen Energy Stadium | Union | 3–2 | United | 2018 MLS season | 16,493 | Stieber, Mattocks | Ilsinho, Sapong, Dočkal | United 13–11–7 | |
| 32 | August 29, 2018 | Audi Field | United | 0–2 | Union | 2018 MLS season | 17,692 | — | Sapong, Picault | United 13–12–7 | |
| 33 | February 20, 2019 | Al Lang Stadium | Union | 2–1 | United | 2019 Suncoast Invitational | 3,405 | Rooney | Burke, Fabián | Tied 13–13–7 | |
| 34 | June 12, 2019 | Audi Field | United | 2–1 | Union | 2019 U.S. Open Cup | 7,000 | McCann, Rooney | Fontana | United 14–13–7 | |
| 35 | August 4, 2019 | Audi Field | United | 1–5 | Union | 2019 MLS season | 18,697 | Brillant | Bedoya, Fabián (2), Przybyłko, Picault | Tied 14–14–7 | |
| 36 | August 24, 2019 | Talen Energy Stadium | Union | 3–1 | United | 2019 MLS season | 18,781 | Acosta | Przybylko, Aaronson, Ilsinho | Union 15–14–7 | |

2020s (Union, 10–2–5)

| No | Date | Venue | Home | Score | Away | Competition | Attendance | DC scorers | PHI scorers | Overall record | Ref |
|---|---|---|---|---|---|---|---|---|---|---|---|
| 37 | February 22, 2020 | Joe DiMaggio Stadium | United | 3–1 | Union | 2020 Suncoast Invitational | 1,202 | Kamara (2), Segura | Jamiro | Tied 15–15–7 | |
| 38 | August 29, 2020 | Subaru Park | Union | 4–1 | United | 2020 MLS season | 0 (Note: Match was played behind closed doors due to local regulations pertaining to the COVID-19 pandemic.) | Gressel | Przybyłko (2), Santos, Aaronson | Union 16–15–7 | |
| 39 | October 14, 2020 | Audi Field | United | 2–2 | Union | 2020 MLS season | 0 | Pines, Asad | Fontana, McKenzie | Union 16–15–8 | |
| 40 | March 31, 2021 | Subaru Park | Union | 4–1 | United | Friendly | 0 | — | Fontana (2) | Union 17–15–8 | |
| 41 | May 23, 2021 | Audi Field | United | 0–1 | Union | 2021 MLS season | 6,000 (Note: Match was played at 30% stadium capacity due to local regulations pertaining to the COVID-19 pandemic.) | — | Przybyłko | Union 18–15–8 | |
| 42 | July 17, 2021 | Subaru Park | Union | 2–1 | United | 2021 MLS season | 16,281 | Asad | Santos, Przybyłko | Union 19–15–8 | |
| 43 | July 8, 2022 | Subaru Park | Union | 7–0 | United | 2022 MLS season | 19,007 | — | Bedoya (2), Carranza (3), Uhre (2) | Union 20–15–8 | |
| 44 | August 20, 2022 | Audi Field | United | 0–6 | Union | 2022 MLS season | 17,941 | — | Przybyłko, Gazdag, Carranza (3), Burke | Union 21–15–8 | |
| 45 | May 17, 2023 | Subaru Park | Union | 0–0 | United | 2023 MLS season | 18,689 | — | — | Union 21–15–9 | |
| 46 | August 3, 2023 | Subaru Park | Union | 0–0 | United | 2023 Leagues Cup | 17,731 | — | — | Union 21–15–10 | |
| 47 | August 26, 2023 | Audi Field | United | 1–3 | Union | 2023 MLS season | 19,215 | Ku-DiPietro | Uhre, McGlynn, Gazdag | Union 22–15–10 | |
| 48 | May 4, 2024 | Audi Field | United | 2–2 | Union | 2024 MLS season | 17,237 | Dájome, Murrell | Bedoya, McGlynn | Union 22–15–11 | |
| 49 | September 22, 2024 | Subaru Park | Union | 4–0 | United | 2024 MLS season | 18,823 | — | Uhre, Gazdag, Baribo | Union 23–15–11 | |
| 50 | April 26, 2025 | Subaru Park | Union | 3–0 | United | 2025 MLS season | 18,626 | — | Glesnes, Jean Jacques, Damiani | Union 24–15–11 | |
| 51 | September 27, 2025 | Audi Field | United | 0–6 | Union | 2025 MLS season | 16,727 | — | Damiani, Antley (o.g.), Vassilev (2), Iloski, Uhre | Union 25–15–11 | |
| 52 | February 21, 2026 | Audi Field | United | 1–0 | Union | 2026 MLS season | 18,003 | Baribo | — | Union 25–16–11 | |
| 53 | April 18, 2026 | Subaru Park | Union | 0–0 | United | 2026 MLS season | 18,529 | — | — | Union 25–16–12 | |

== Players and transfers ==
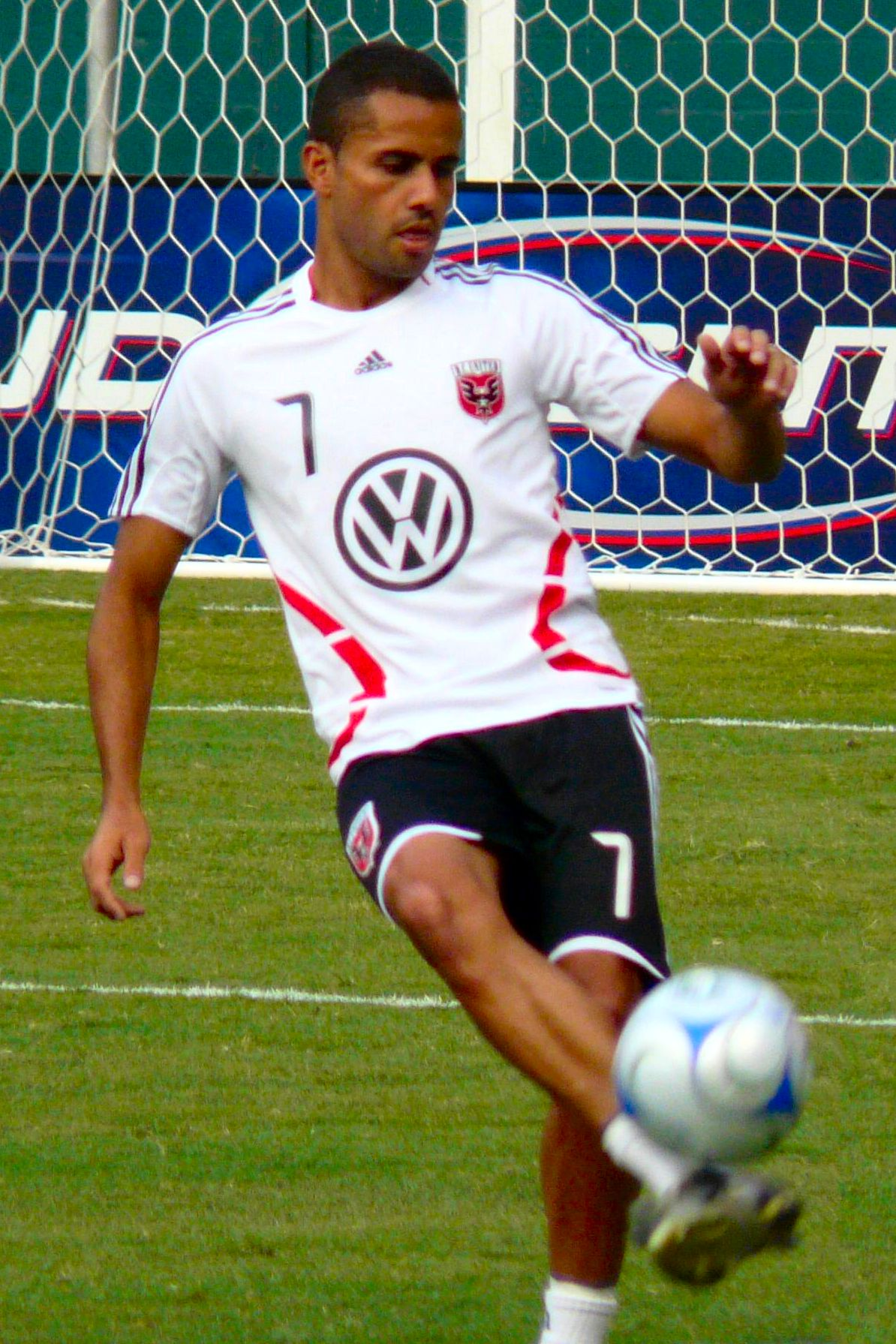
Brazilian midfielder, Fred, has had two different spells for both D.C. United and Philadelphia Union.

=== D.C., then Philadelphia ===
| Player | Pos. | D.C. United | | | Philadelphia | | |
| Player | Pos. | Career | Apps | Goals | Career | Apps | Goals |
|---|---|---|---|---|---|---|---|
| (United States) Chris Albright | DF | 1999–2001 | 56 | 4 | 2012–2013 | 10 | 0 |
| (United States) Justin Mapp | DF | 2002 | 3 | 0 | 2010–2011 | 44 | 4 |
| (Brazil) Fred | MF | 2007–2009 | 72 | 11 | 2010 | 25 | 4 |
| (Brazil) Fred | MF | 2011 | 17 | 0 | 2014–2015 | 17 | 1 |
| (United States) Brian Carroll | MF | 2003–2007 | 121 | 2 | 2011–2017 | 166 | 5 |
| (United States) Freddy Adu | FW | 2004–2006 | 87 | 11 | 2011–2013 | 35 | 7 |
| (United States) Andrew Jacobson | MF | 2009 | 17 | 0 | 2010 | 25 | 0 |
| (United States) Chris Pontius | FW | 2009–2015 | 152 | 31 | 2016–2017 | 63 | 14 |
| (United States) Charlie Davies | FW | 2011 | 26 | 11 | 2016–2017 | 11 | 0 |
| (United States) Ethan White | DF | 2011–2013 | 38 | 1 | 2014–2015 | 28 | 0 |
| (United States) Danny Cruz | MF | 2012 | 16 | 1 | 2012–2015 | 70 | 7 |

=== Philadelphia, then D.C. ===
| Player | Pos. | Philadelphia | | | D.C. United | | |
| Player | Pos. | Career | Apps | Goals | Career | Apps | Goals |
|---|---|---|---|---|---|---|---|
| (Brazil) Fred | MF | 2010 | 25 | 4 | 2011 | 17 | 0 |
| (United States) Chris Seitz | GK | 2010 | 23 | 0 | 2019–2021 | 11 | 0 |
| (Guatemala) Carlos Ruiz | FW | 2011 | 14 | 6 | 2013 | 13 | 0 |
| (United States) Michael Farfan | MF | 2011–2013 | 82 | 4 | 2015 | 17 | 0 |
| (Colombia) Lionard Pajoy | FW | 2012 | 20 | 5 | 2012–2013 | 33 | 5 |
| (United States) Jeff Parke | DF | 2013 | 31 | 0 | 2014 | 13 | 0 |
| (Israel) Tai Baribo | FW | 2023–2025 | 54 | 25 | 2025– | 1 | 1 |

== Statistics ==
=== Summary ===
As of April 18, 2026

| Competition | Matches | **DC wins** | **DC goals** | Draws | **PHI wins** | **PHI goals** |
| Major League Soccer | 40 | 9 | 37 | 9 | 22 | 84 |
| U.S. Open Cup | 4 | 3 | 10 | 0 | 1 | 6 |
| Suncoast Invitational | 5 | 3 | 10 | 1 | 1 | 7 |
| WDW Pro Soccer Classic | 1 | 1 | 2 | 0 | 0 | 0 |
| Other friendlies | 3 | 0 | 3 | 2 | 1 | 6 |
| Total | 53 | 16 | 62 | 12 | 25 | 103 |

=== Honors ===
With 13 major honors, D.C. United have won more major competitions than any other Major League Soccer club, and are tied for the most of any North American soccer franchise ever. D.C. United won their first major title in 1996, winning the 1996 MLS Cup championship. Since then, they have claimed three additional MLS Cups (league championship), four Supporters' Shields (league premiership), three U.S. Open Cups (national championship) and one CONCACAF Champions Cup title (continental championship). In addition, United won the 1998 Copa Interamericana, an infrequently-held and now-defunct super cup between the champions of CONCACAF and CONMEBOL.

Philadelphia won their first major title in 2020 when they won the Supporters Shield for having the best regular season record, they repeated this five years later. They reached the U.S. Open Cup final in 2014, 2015, and 2018 and in 2022 were the runners-up in the MLS Cup final.

Table correct as of October 4, 2025

| Honor | D.C. United | | Philadelphia | |
| Honor | Titles | Last won | Titles | Last won |
|---|---|---|---|---|
| MLS Cup | **4** | **2004** | 0 | — |
| Supporters' Shield | **4** | 2007 | 2 | **2025** |
| U.S. Open Cup | **3** | **2013** | 0 | — |
| Eastern Conference regular season | **6** | 2014 | 2 | **2022** |
| Eastern Conference post-season | **5** | 2004 | 1 | **2022** |
| CONCACAF Champions Cup (Note: Known as the CONCACAF Champions League from 2008 until 2023.) | **1** | **1998** | 0 | — |
| Leagues Cup (Note: Includes the North American SuperLiga that was played from 2007 until 2011.) | 0 | — | 0 | — |
| Copa Interamericana | **1** | **1998** | 0 | — |
| FIFA Club World Cup | 0 | — | 0 | — |
| Total | **24** | 2014 | 5 | **2025** |

=== Top goalscorers ===
Bold denotes player that is still active for one of the two clubs.

As of April 18, 2026

| Player | Club | Goals |
|---|---|---|
| (France) Sébastien Le Toux | Philadelphia Union | 8 |
| (Argentina) Julián Carranza | Philadelphia Union | 6 |
| (Poland) Kacper Przybyłko | Philadelphia Union | 5 |
| (United States) **Alejandro Bedoya** | Philadelphia Union | 4 |
| (United States) Chris Pontius | D.C. United | 4 |
| (Denmark) Mikael Uhre | Philadelphia Union | 4 |
| (Argentina) Luciano Acosta | D.C. United | 3 |
| (Hungary) Dániel Gazdag | Philadelphia Union | 3 |
| (Colombia) Lionard Pajoy | D.C. United | 3 |
| (Haiti) Fafà Picault | Philadelphia Union | 3 |
| (United States) Josh Wolff | D.C. United | 3 |

=== Eastern Conference standings finishes ===
D.C. United Philadelphia Union

| P. | 2010 | 2011 | 2012 | 2013 | 2014 | 2015 | 2016 | 2017 | 2018 | 2019 | 2020 | 2021 | 2022 | 2023 | 2024 | 2025 | 2026 |
|---|---|---|---|---|---|---|---|---|---|---|---|---|---|---|---|---|---|
| 1 | | | | | **1** | | | | | | **1** | | **1** | | | **1** | |
| 2 | | | **2** | | | | | | | | | **2** | | | | | |
| 3 | | **3** | | | | | | | | **3** | | | | | | | |
| 4 | | | | | | **4** | **4** | | **4** | | | | | **4** | | | |
| 5 | | | | | | | | | | **5** | | | | | | | |
| 6 | | | | | **6** | | **6** | | **6** | | | | | | | | **6** |
| 7 | **7** | **7** | | **7** | | | | | | | | | | | | | |
| 8 | **8** | | **8** | | | | | **8** | | | | **8** | | | | | |
| 9 | | | | | | **9** | | | | | | | | | | | |
| 10 | | | | **10** | | | | | | | | | | | **10** | | |
| 11 | | | | | | | | **11** | | | | | | | | | |
| 12 | | | | | | | | | | | | | | **12** | **12** | | |
| 13 | | | | | | | | | | | **13** | | | | | | |
| 14 | | | | | | | | | | | | | **14** | | | | **14** |
| 15 | | | | | | | | | | | | | | | | **15** | |

• Total: D.C. United with 6 higher finishes, Philadelphia Union with 11 higher finishes.

== See also ==
- Capitals–Flyers rivalry
- Commanders–Eagles rivalry
- I-95 derbies
