= 2021 Loudoun United FC season =

Loudoun United FC
2021 season
- Head coach: Ryan Martin
- Stadium: Segra Field
- Highest home attendance: 1,126 (6/8 v. CHS)
- Lowest home attendance: 310 (8/18 v. IND)
- Average home league attendance: 639
- Biggest win: LDN 4–1 IND (8/18)
- Biggest defeat: LDN 0–5 CLT (9/8); PIT 5–0 LDN (9/11); MIA 6–1 LDN (9/25)

The 2021 Loudoun United FC season was Loudoun United FC's third season of existence, their third in the second-division of American soccer, and their third in the USL Championship.

== Club ==
=== Roster ===
As of September 25, 2021

No.	Pos.	Nation	Player
0	GK	ENG	Jermaine Fordah
1	GK	USA	Keegan Meyer
2	DF	CIV	Gaoussou Samaké (on loan from ASEC Mimosas)
4	MF	ESA	Jeremy Garay
5	DF	USA	Hassan Pinto
6	FW	CAN	Massimo Ferrin
7	FW	VEN	Darluis Paz
8	MF	USA	Barakatulla Sharifi
9	FW	VEN	Jovanny Bolívar
10	FW	USA	Michael Gamble
12	FW	USA	Giovanni Montesdeoca
13	MF	ESA	Allexon Saravia
14	MF	USA	Tyler Gabarra
15	MF	USA	Nicky Downs
17	FW	ENG	Kimarni Smith
18	DF	GHA	Wahab Ackwei
19	DF	CIV	Landry Nanan Houssou (on loan from ASI D'Abengourou)
21	MF	USA	Ted Ku-DiPietro
22	DF	USA	Robby Dambrot
23	DF	MEX	Diego Gomez-Ochoa
24	FW	USA	Sammy Sergi
26	DF	USA	Owen Walz
27	DF	USA	Matt Di Rosa
28	MF	USA	Mathias Yohannes
29	DF	USA	Timmy Mehl
30	GK	ENG	Noah Abrams
31	GK	USA	Jonathan Mennell
33	DF	USA	Jacob Greene
34	MF	USA	Abdellatif Aboukoura
35	DF	USA	Troy Matingou
37	MF	USA	Jackson Hopkins
44	DF	USA	Jace Clark
55	DF	USA	Michael DeShields

Signed to first team contract with D.C. United.
D.C. United Academy player.

== Competitions ==
=== Exhibitions ===
March 26	D.C. United	5–1	Loudoun United FC	Washington, DC
3:00 PM EST				Stadium: Audi Field; Attendance: 0

April 3	Loudoun United FC	Cancelled	Philadelphia Union II	Leesburg, VA
				Stadium: Segra Field

April 10	Loudoun United FC	Cancelled	Richmond Kickers	Leesburg, VA
				Stadium: Segra Field

=== USL Championship ===
The USLC realigned itself to place the current 31 teams into four regional divisions, with Loudoun in the Atlantic Division. Loudoun would play its divisional rivals four times each (evenly split between home and away matches), with the remaining four games against non-division teams.

May 2 1	Miami FC	2–1	Loudoun United FC	Miami, Florida
7:30 PM EDT	Craig 6'; Ackwei 7' (o.g.); Löbe (red card) 14'; François (yellow card) 59'; Reid (yellow card) 84'; Walker (yellow card) 90+1'	Report	Sergi (yellow card) 53'; Amoustapha 82'	Stadium: Riccardo Silva Stadium; Referee: Natalie Simon

May 18 2	Loudoun United FC	1–2	New York Red Bulls II	Leesburg, Virginia
7:00 PM EDT	Sergi 27', (yellow card) 52'; Amoustapha (yellow card) 36'; Ku-Dipietro (yellow card) 42'; Fordah (yellow card) 63'; Paz (yellow card) 75'; Panchot (yellow card) 74'	Report	Sowe 4', (yellow card) 75'; Edelman (yellow card) 26'; Egbo 64' (pen.); Brummett (yellow card) 90+3'	Stadium: Segra Field; Attendance: 710; Referee: Danielle Chesky

May 29 3	New Mexico United	0–1	Loudoun United FC	Albuquerque, New Mexico
9:30 PM EDT	Yearwood (red card) 23'	Report	Bolívar 40'; Mehl (yellow card) 57'; Samaké (yellow card) 60'	Stadium: Rio Grande Credit Union Field at Isotopes Park; Attendance: 8,801; Referee: Chris Ruska

June 2 4	Loudoun United FC	2–3	Pittsburgh Riverhounds SC	Leesburg, Virginia
7:00 PM EDT	Landry (yellow card) 14'; Mehl (yellow card) 20'; Samaké (yellow card) 46'; Bolívar 50'; DeShields (yellow card) 57'; Panchot 70'	Report	Velarde 18'; Ackwei 41' (o.g.); Dixon (yellow card) 51'; Cicerone 58' (pen.); Gatt (yellow card) 72'	Stadium: Segra Field; Attendance: 817; Referee: John Griggs

June 8 5	Loudoun United FC	0–1	Charleston Battery	Leesburg, Virginia
7:00 PM EDT	Ku-Dipietro (yellow card) 90+5'	Report	Fahling 73'; Kelly-Rosales (yellow card) 67'; Bunting (yellow card) 86'	Stadium: Segra Field; Attendance: 1,126; Referee: Nabil Bensalah

June 11 6	Tampa Bay Rowdies	2–1	Loudoun United FC	St. Petersburg, Florida
7:30 PM EDT	Antley (yellow card) 13'; Guenzatti 34'; Wyke (yellow card) 79'; Langsdorf 85', (yellow card) 86'	Report	Dambrot 4', (yellow card) 23'; Bolívar (yellow card) 74'	Stadium: Al Lang Stadium; Attendance: 4,332; Referee: Jonathan Bilinski

June 19 7	Hartford Athletic	2–1	Loudoun United FC	Hartford, Connecticut
7:00 PM EDT	Obregón Jr. 6'; Yacoubou (yellow card) 77'; Cardona 90+5'	Report	Mehl (yellow card) 25'; Bolivar 78' (pen.); Houssou (yellow card) 86'	Stadium: Dillon Stadium; Attendance: 4,019; Referee: Christian Centeno

June 26 8	Charleston Battery	3–0	Loudoun United FC	Mount Pleasant, South Carolina
7:00 PM EDT	Zarokostas (yellow card) 2', (goal) 16'; Daley 35', 60'; Gdula (yellow card) 51'	Report		Stadium: Patriots Point Soccer Complex; Attendance: 2,694; Referee: Adam Kilpatrick

June 30 9	Loudoun United FC	2–1	Pittsburgh Riverhounds SC	Leesburg, Virginia
8:45 PM EDT	Ku-Dipietro 42'; Bolivar 75'	Report	Perez 48'	Stadium: Segra Field; Attendance: 984; Referee: Matthew Franz

July 4 10	Loudoun United FC	0–2	Hartford Athletic	Leesburg, Virginia
5:00 PM EDT	Bolívar (penalty missed) 58'; Gomez (yellow card) 89'; Downs (yellow card) 90'; Gamble (red card) 90+3'	Report	Gómez (yellow card) 44'; Rogers 64'; Preston 73'; Yacoubou (yellow card) 90+3'	Stadium: Segra Field; Attendance: 693; Referee: Jeremy Scheer

July 11 11	Loudoun United FC	1–4	Miami FC	Leesburg, Virginia
5:00 PM EDT	Ku-Dipietro (yellow card) 29'; Walz (yellow card) 41', (goal) 75'; Gomez (yellow card) 59'	Report	Akinyode (yellow card) 18', (goal) 26' da Silva (yellow card) 38'; Anglin (yellow card) 61'; François 70'; Martínez 73'; Forbes 90+2'	Stadium: Segra Field; Attendance: 402; Referee: John Matto

July 17 12	Pittsburgh Riverhounds SC	1–0	Loudoun United FC	Pittsburgh, Pennsylvania
7:00 PM EDT	Cicerone 6'; Rovira (yellow card) 68'	Report	Di Rosa (yellow card) 8'; Saravia (yellow card) 42'; Smith (yellow card) 78'	Stadium: Highmark Stadium; Attendance: 3,483; Referee: Kyle Johnston

July 24 13	Tampa Bay Rowdies	3–1	Loudoun United FC	St. Petersburg, Florida
7:30 EDT	Guillén 7'; Fernandes (yellow card) 21', (goal) 52'; Lasso (yellow card) 37'; Ekra (yellow card) 73'; Guenzatti 74'	Report	Smith (yellow card) 34'; Downs 70'	Stadium: Al Lang Stadium; Attendance: 4,920; Referee: Sergii Demianchuk

July 27 14	Loudoun United FC	3–5	Charleston Battery	Leesburg, Virginia
7:00 PM EDT	Walz (yellow card) 2'; Ku-Dipietro 22'; Amoustapha 41'; Hogan 45' (o.g.); Landry (yellow card) 87'	Report	Repetto 4', 32'; Zarokostas 9'; Archer (yellow card) 23'; Daley (yellow card) 45+5'; Harmon 56'; Lewis 90' (pen.)	Stadium: Segra Field; Attendance: 556; Referee: John Griggs

July 31 15	Loudoun United FC	1–3	Colorado Springs Switchbacks FC	Leesburg, Virginia
7:00 PM EDT	Pinto (yellow card) 15'; Amoustapha (yellow card) 41'; Mehl (yellow card) 66'; Smith 70'	Report	Hodge (yellow card) 45+2'; Torres (yellow card) 58' Edwards 63', (yellow card) 90+4'; Toure 65'; Echevarria (yellow card) 68' Barry 90+2'	Stadium: Segra Field; Attendance: 905; Referee: Izlen Peksenar

August 6 16	Loudoun United FC	0–0	Charlotte Independence	Leesburg, Virginia
7:00 PM EDT	Amoustapha (yellow card) 11'; Ku-Dipietro (yellow card) 60'	Report	Sabella (yellow card) 32'; Armour (yellow card) 39'; Bronico (yellow card) 45+3'	Stadium: Segra Field; Attendance: 519; Referee: Gabriele Giusti

August 13 17	Charleston Battery	1–0	Loudoun United FC	Mount Pleasant, South Carolina
7:00 PM EDT	Harmon (yellow card) 56'; Crawford 79'; Piggott (yellow card) 84'; Pérez (yellow card) 90+8'	Report	Downs (yellow card) 4'; Garay (yellow card) 30'; Dambrot (penalty missed) 38'; Fordah (yellow card) 84'; Hopkins (yellow card) 90+5'	Stadium: Patriots Point Soccer Complex; Attendance: 3,059; Referee: Elvis Osmanovic

August 18 18	Loudoun United FC	4–1	Indy Eleven	Leesburg, Virginia
7:00 PM EDT	Sergi 43', 45+1'; Dambrot (yellow card) 47'; Paz 73'; Ku-Dipietro 76'; Saravia (yellow card) 85'; Amoustapha (yellow card) 90+2'	Report	Cochran (yellow card) 33'; Ouimette (yellow card) 34', (goal) 78'; Moon (yellow card) 64'	Stadium: Segra Field; Attendance: 310; Referee: Matthew Franz

August 23 19	Loudoun United FC	0–2	Tampa Bay Rowdies	Leesburg, Virginia
7:00 PM EDT	Saravia (yellow card) 36'; Landry (yellow card) 64'	Report	Hilton 23'; Lasso 45+3'; Wyke (yellow card) 82'; Mkosana (yellow card) 87'	Stadium: Segra Field; Attendance: 360; Referee: Luis Arroyo

September 4 20	Rio Grande Valley FC Toros	1–1	Loudoun United FC	Edinburg, Texas
7:30 p.m. CST	Amoh 14' (pen.); Pimentel (yellow card) 68'; Sorto (yellow card) 80'	Report	Mehl (yellow card) 13'; Saravia (yellow card) 15'; Ku-Dipietro 20' (pen.)	Stadium: H-E-B Park; Attendance: 3,052; Referee: Elton García

September 8 21	Loudoun United FC	0–5	Charlotte Independence	Leesburg, Virginia
7:00 PM EDT	Landry (yellow card) 3' (yellow-red card) 37'	Report	Parra (yellow card) 23', (goal) 28', 40'; Roberts 49'; Palomino 74'; Sabella 81'; Pack (yellow card) 84'	Stadium: Segra Field; Attendance: 546; Referee: Alyssa Nichols

September 11 22	Pittsburgh Riverhounds SC	5–0	Loudoun United FC	Pittsburgh, Pennsylvania
7:00 PM EDT	Wharton 20'; Forbes 58', 82'; Cicerone 75'; Williamson 80'; Perez (yellow card) 90+2'	Report		Stadium: Highmark Stadium; Attendance: 3,502; Referee: Calin Radosav

September 25 23	Miami FC	6–1	Loudoun United FC	Miami, Florida
7:30 PM EDT	François (yellow card) 9', (goal) 55', 63'; Martínez 25'; Forbes 32'; Walker 39'; Reid 81'; Palacios (yellow card) 88'	Report	Ku-DiPietro 48'	Stadium: Riccardo Silva Stadium; Attendance: 418; Referee: Brandon Stevis

September 30 24	New York Red Bulls II	3–3	Loudoun United FC	Montclair, New Jersey
7:00 PM EDT	Zajec (yellow card) 25'; Sowe 37' (pen.); Archimède 55'; Jørgensen 58'; Knapp (yellow card) 63'	Report	DiPietro 4'; Hopkins 20'; Mehl (yellow card) 24'; Mennell (yellow card) 36'; Samaké 57'	Stadium: MSU Soccer Park at Pittser Field; Attendance: 485; Referee: William Steffen

October 3 25	Charlotte Independence	5–1	Loudoun United FC	Charlotte, North Carolina
7:00 PM EDT	Obertan 7'; Johnson 8'; Bronico 13', (yellow card) 32'; Marveaux 19'; Kelly 45'	Report	Dambrot (yellow card) 38'; Mehl (yellow card) 76'; Clark 80', (yellow card) 86'	Stadium: American Legion Memorial Stadium; Attendance: 1,207; Referee: Jeremy Scheer

October 10 26	Loudoun United FC	3–2	Miami FC	Leesburg, Virginia
1:00 PM EDT	Paz (yellow card) 5' (yellow-red card) 26'; Greene 20'; Landry (yellow card) 32'; Bolívar (yellow card) 72', (goal) 86'; Ku-DiPietro 77' (pen.); Clark (yellow card) 90+4'	Report	François 13' (pen.); Akinyode (yellow card) 31'; Walker (yellow card) 65'; Cortez 74'; Craig (red card) 75'; Reid (yellow card) 88'	Stadium: Segra Field; Referee: Matthew Franz

October 13 27	Loudoun United FC	2–3	Hartford Athletic	Leesburg, Virginia
7:00 p.m. EDT	Bolívar 13'; Garay (yellow card) 38'; Gabarra 51'; Gamble (yellow card) 56'; Mehl (yellow card) 59'; Pinto (yellow card) 73'	Report	Yacoubou (yellow card) 14'; McGlynn 57'; Obregón Jr. 69'; Pinto 81' (o.g.); Preston (yellow card) 90+5'	Stadium: Segra Field; Attendance: 368; Referee: DeShun Beard

October 16 28	Hartford Athletic	1–0	Loudoun United	Hartford, Connecticut
11:00 a.m. EDT	McGlynn 33', (yellow card) 51'; Obregón Jr. (yellow card) 60'; Cardona (yellow card) 78'; Haak (yellow card) 87'	Report	Greene (yellow card) 32'	Stadium: Dillon Stadium; Attendance: 4,908; Referee: Benjamin Meyer

October 20 29	New York Red Bulls II	3–0	Loudoun United FC	Montclair, New Jersey
7:00 PM EDT	Archimède 19', (yellow card) 40'; Sowe (yellow card) 38'; Harper 47' (pen.); Egbo 56', (yellow card) 57'	Report	Mehl (yellow card) 24'; Ku-DiPietro (penalty missed) 37', (yellow card) 68'; Dambrot (yellow card) 38'; Landry (yellow card) 51'; Bolívar (yellow card) 81'	Stadium: MSU Soccer Park at Pittser Field; Attendance: 520; Referee: Corbyn May

October 23 30	Loudoun United FC	0–1	Tampa Bay Rowdies	Leesburg, Virginia
7:00 PM EDT	Houssou (yellow card) 75'; Paz (yellow card) 86'	Report	Dos Santos 40'; Antley (yellow card) 41'; Hilton (yellow card) 71'; Dalgaard (yellow card) 86'	Stadium: Segra Field; Attendance: 917; Referee: Abdou Ndiaye

October 27 31	Charlotte Independence	1–0	Loudoun United FC	Charlotte, North Carolina
5:30 PM EDT	Fuchs (yellow card) 30'; Martínez 38'; Riascos (yellow card) 75'	Report	Mehl (yellow card) 78'; Hopkins (yellow card) 88'	Stadium: American Legion Memorial Stadium; Attendance: 1,782; Referee: Kevin Broadley

October 30 32	Loudoun United FC	1–4	New York Red Bulls II	Leesburg, Virginia
1:00 PM EDT	Hopkins 7', (yellow card) 20'; Ku-DiPietro (yellow card) 37'; Clark (yellow card) 68'; Greene (yellow card) 86'; Fordah (yellow card) 86'	Report	Sowe 5'; Rafanello 26', 90+4'; Knapp (yellow card) 58'; Edelman 73'; Egbo (yellow card) 84'	Stadium: Segra Field; Referee: Jalen Gray

=== Atlantic Division ===
Pos	Team	Pld	W	L	T	GF	GA	GD	Pts	Qualification
1	Tampa Bay Rowdies	32	23	7	2	55	23	+32	71	Advance to USL Championship Playoffs
2	Charlotte Independence	32	18	9	5	57	36	+21	59	Advance to USL Championship Playoffs
3	Pittsburgh Riverhounds SC	32	17	8	7	52	34	+18	58 (Note: The USL decided to replay the sides' October 16 match from the 67th minute after the referee wrongly disallowed a Pittsburgh Riverhounds SC goal. The original score was 0–0.)	Advance to USL Championship Playoffs
4	Miami FC	32	16	10	6	55	40	+15	54	Advance to USL Championship Playoffs
5	Hartford Athletic	32	12	15	5	50	50	0	41	
6	Charleston Battery	32	10	15	7	49	60	−11	37	
7	New York Red Bulls II	32	7	18	7	42	67	−25	28	
8	Loudoun United FC	32	4	25	3	31	78	−47	15	

Source: USL

=== U.S. Open Cup ===
Due to their ownership by a higher division professional club (D.C. United), LUFC is one of 15 teams expressly forbidden from entering the Cup competition.
