= 2023 D.C. United season =

D.C. United 2023 soccer season

D.C. United
2023 season
- Sporting director: Dave Kasper
- Head coach: Wayne Rooney (Note: Relieved of coaching duties after the final game of the D.C. United season, but prior to the final game of the entire regular season.)
- Stadium: Audi Field
- MLS: Conference: 12th Overall: 23rd
- MLS Cup playoffs: Did not qualify
- Leagues Cup: Round of 32
- U.S. Open Cup: Fourth round
- Top goalscorer: League: Christian Benteke (14); All: Christian Benteke (14)
- Highest home attendance: 19,215 (Note: Sellout crowd that occurred on seven different occasions: April 29 vs. Charlotte FC; May 13 vs. Nashville SC; May 20 vs. LA Galaxy; June 17 vs. Real Salt Lake; July 8 vs. Inter Miami CF; August 26 vs. Philadelphia Union; and, October 7 vs. New York City FC.)
- Lowest home attendance: 8,686 vs. Richmond Kickers; April 26, 2023 (U.S. Open Cup)
- Average home league attendance: 17,540
- Biggest win: 4–0 vs. Chicago Fire (Home); September 2, 2023 (Major League Soccer)
- Biggest defeat: 0–4 vs. New England Revolution (Away); July 15, 2023 (Major League Soccer)
Home colors	Away colors

The 2023 season was D.C. United's 28th in existence and its 28th consecutive season in the top division of American soccer, Major League Soccer. In addition to MLS, D.C. United participated in the 2023 U.S. Open Cup and 2023 Leagues Cup, the latter their first international club tournament since 2016. The season was the first full season with Wayne Rooney as head coach. The season covered the period from November 1, 2022, to October 31, 2023.

This was the first season since 2008 where long-time United goalkeeper, Bill Hamid, is not on the roster.

== Background ==
The 2022 season was a tumultuous season for United. The club finished at the bottom of the MLS table and saw the firing of then-head coach Hernán Losada early in the season, followed by their interim manager, Chad Ashton being removed from interim duties halfway through the season, prior to Wayne Rooney's arrival. The club set a record in the number of goals conceded (75) and the largest losses in club history, both to Philadelphia Union, a six-goal home loss, and a seven-goal away loss. Midseason acquisition, Taxiarchis Fountas lead United in goals during the season, scoring 12 goals in 21 appearances, being United's lone player selected for the 2022 MLS All-Star Game. Outside of MLS, United were eliminated in the fourth round proper of the U.S. Open Cup by their longtime rivals, the New York Red Bulls.

The offseason saw Lucy Rushton fired as general manager. Head coach Wayne Rooney and sporting director Dave Kasper retained their roles.

== Club ==
=== Team management ===
Position	Name
Chairman	(United States) Jason Levien
Co-Chairman	(United States) Stephen Kaplan
Sporting Director	(United States) Dave Kasper
General Manager	Vacant
Technical Director	(United States) Stewart Mairs
Head coach	(England) Wayne Rooney
Assistant coach	(France) Frédéric Brillant
Assistant coach	(Wales) Carl Robinson
Assistant coach	(England) Pete Shuttleworth
Goalkeeping coach	(United States) Diego Restrepo

=== Roster ===
As of July 16, 2023

Squad No.	Name	Nationality	Position(s)	Date of birth (age)	Apps	Goals	Assists	Signed from
Goalkeepers
1	Tyler Miller	(United States)	GK	March 12, 1993 (age 32)	22	0	0	(United States) Minnesota United FC
24	Alex Bono	(United States)	GK	April 25, 1994 (aged 28)	3	0	0	(Canada) Toronto FC
50	Luis Zamudio	(United States)	GK	June 24, 1998 (aged 24)	0	0	0	(United States) Loudoun United
Defenders
2	Ruan	(Brazil)	RB	May 29, 1995 (aged 27)	16	0	4	(United States) Orlando City SC
3	Derrick Williams	(Republic of Ireland)	CB	January 17, 1993 (aged 30)	17	1	0	(United States) LA Galaxy
4	Brendan Hines-Ike	(United States)	CB	November 30, 1994 (aged 28)	39	1	0	(Belgium) Kortrijk
5	Mohanad Jeahze	(Iraq)	LB	April 10, 1997 (aged 25)	6	0	1	(Sweden) Hammarby IF
14	Andy Najar	(Honduras)	RB	March 16, 1993 (aged 29)	150	11	15	(United States) Los Angeles FC
15	Steve Birnbaum	(United States)	CB	January 23, 1991 (aged 32)	262	14	6	(United States) California Golden Bears
23	Donovan Pines	(United States)	CB	March 7, 1998 (aged 24)	86	6	1	(United States) Maryland Terrapins
30	Hayden Sargis	(United States)	CB	May 2, 2002 (aged 20)	5	0	0	(United States) Sacramento Republic
31	Eric Davis	(Panama)	LB	March 31, 1991 (aged 31)	1	0	0	(Slovakia) DAC Dunajská Streda
33	Jacob Greene	(United States)	LB / RB	March 23, 2003 (aged 19)	14	1	0	(United States) D.C. United Academy
45	Matai Akinmboni	(United States)	CB	October 17, 2006 (aged 16)	6	0	0	(United States) D.C. United Academy
72	Gaoussou Samaké	(Ivory Coast)	LB	November 4, 1997 (aged 25)	9	0	0	(Ivory Coast) ASEC Mimosas
Midfielders
6	Russell Canouse	(United States)	DM	June 11, 1995 (aged 27)	130	5	6	(Germany) Hoffenheim
7	Pedro Santos	(Portugal)	MF / RW	April 22, 1988 (aged 34)	15	1	1	(United States) Columbus Crew
8	Chris Durkin	(United States)	DM / RM	February 8, 2000 (aged 23)	95	4	5	(Belgium) Sint-Truiden
10	Gabriel Pirani	(Brazil)	AM	April 12, 2002 (aged 20)	0	0	0	(Brazil) Santos FC (on loan)
18	Jeremy Garay	(El Salvador)	MF	April 1, 2003 (aged 19)	1	0	0	(United States) D.C. United Academy
21	Ted Ku-DiPietro	(United States)	AM	January 28, 2002 (aged 21)	29	3	1	(United States) Loudoun United
22	Yamil Asad	(Argentina)	AM / LW	July 27, 1994 (aged 28)	88	15	8	(Chile) Universidad Católica
25	Jackson Hopkins	(United States)	AM / SS	July 1, 2004 (aged 18)	29	0	1	(United States) D.C. United Academy
43	Mateusz Klich	(Poland)	CM	June 30, 1990 (aged 32)	24	2	5	(England) Leeds United
49	Ravel Morrison (Note: Though still under contract with the club for 2023, Morrison was left off the official roster and is ineligible to play with the team in MLS competition.)	(Jamaica)	MF	February 2, 1993 (aged 30)	14	2	0	(England) Derby County
77	Martín Rodríguez (Note: Added to Season-Ending Injury List.)	(Chile)	MF / LW	August 5, 1994 (aged 28)	14	0	1	(Turkey) Altay SK
Forwards
9	Erik Hurtado	(United States)	CF	November 15, 1990 (aged 32)	4	0	0	(United States) San Antonio FC
12	Cristian Dájome	(Colombia)	LW	January 3, 1994 (aged 29)	13	2	1	(Canada) Vancouver Whitecaps FC
19	Nigel Robertha	(Curaçao)	CF	March 13, 1998 (aged 24)	43	7	4	(Bulgaria) Levski Sofia
20	Christian Benteke	(Belgium)	ST	December 3, 1990 (aged 32)	28	9	2	(England) Crystal Palace
26	Kristian Fletcher	(United States)	FW	October 16, 2004 (aged 18)	14	1	1	(United States) Loudoun United
84	José Fajardo	(Panama)	ST	August 18, 1993 (aged 29)	0	0	0	(Peru) Cusco FC

== Non-competitive ==
=== Friendlies ===
January 24	LA Galaxy	3–2	D.C. United	Carson, CA
2:00 pm EST	Puig; Álvarez; Judd		Pedro Santos; Ku-DiPietro	Stadium: Dignity Health Sports Park; Attendance: 0

February 1	Charlotte FC	3–2	D.C. United	Indio, CA
2:00 pm EST	Vargas 5'; Gaines 39'; Świderski 54'	Report	Benteke 3'; Durkin 42'	Stadium: Empire Polo Club

February 1	Vancouver Whitecaps FC	1–1	D.C. United	Indio, CA
4:00 pm EST	Laborda 37'	MLS Report; VAN report	Rocha 29'	Stadium: Empire Polo Club
Note: This match will be only 45 minutes long.

February 6	Los Angeles FC	1–2	D.C. United	Indio, CA
4:00 pm EST	Bouanga 54'	Report	Ku-DiPietro 68'; Benteke 90+3'	Stadium: Empire Polo Club

February 9	San Jose Earthquakes	2–1	D.C. United	Indio, CA
2:00 pm EST				Stadium: Empire Polo Club

=== Midseason exhibitions ===
June 7	D.C. United	0–1	Necaxa	Washington, DC
7:30 pm EST				Stadium: Audi Field; Attendance: 10,919

October 14	D.C. United	2–1	Medeama	Washington, DC
7:30 pm EST	Dájome 15'; Robertha 58'	Report	Abdullai 53'	Stadium: Audi Field; Attendance: 3,825

== Competitive ==
=== Major League Soccer ===
==== Standings ====
===== Eastern Conference =====
MLS Eastern Conference table (2023)
Pos	Team	Pld	W	L	T	GF	GA	GD	Pts
10	CF Montréal	34	12	17	5	36	52	−16	41
11	New York City FC	34	9	11	14	35	39	−4	41
12	D.C. United	34	10	14	10	45	49	−4	40
13	Chicago Fire FC	34	10	14	10	39	51	−12	40
14	Inter Miami CF	34	9	18	7	41	54	−13	34

Source: MLS
Rules for classification: 1) points; 2) total wins; 3) total goal differential; 4) total goals scored; 5) fewer disciplinary points; 6) away goal differential; 7) away goals scored; 8) home goals differential; 9) home goals scored; 10) coin toss (2 clubs tied) or drawing of lots (≥3 clubs tied)

===== Overall table =====
Overall MLS standings table
Pos	Team	Pld	W	L	T	GF	GA	GD	Pts
21	Minnesota United FC	34	10	13	11	46	51	−5	41
22	New York City FC	34	9	11	14	35	39	−4	41
23	D.C. United	34	10	14	10	45	49	−4	40
24	Chicago Fire FC	34	10	14	10	39	51	−12	40
25	Austin FC	34	10	15	9	49	55	−6	39

Source: MLS
Rules for classification: 1) points; 2) total wins; 3) total goal differential; 4) total goals scored; 5) fewer disciplinary points; 6) away goal differential; 7) away goals scored; 8) home goals differential; 9) home goals scored; 10) coin toss (2 clubs tied) or drawing of lots (≥3 clubs tied)

==== Results summary ====
Overall								Home						Away					
Pld	W	D	L	GF	GA	GD	Pts	W	D	L	GF	GA	GD	W	D	L	GF	GA	GD
34	10	10	14	4	5	−1	40	6	6	5	4	3	+1	4	4	9	0	2	−2

Last updated: March 17, 2023.
Source: MLS

==== Results by matchday ====
Game Week	1	2	3	4	5	6	7	8
Stadium	H	A	H	A	H	H	H	A
Result	W	L	D	L	L	D	L	W
Position (Conf.)	5	9	8	11	12	13	14	11
Position (Ovr.)	9	17	15	18	21	22	24	20

Updated to match(es) played on March 2022. Source: MLS
A = Away; H = Home; W = Win; D = Draw; L = Loss; P = Postponed
Notes: Positions show the situation at the end of the corresponding Game Weeks (GW); not the position at the conclusion of matches or game days

==== Match results ====
February 25 1	D.C. United	3–2	Toronto FC	Washington, DC
7:30 pm EST	Klich 13'; Canouse (yellow card) 56'; Benteke (yellow card) 60', (goal) 90'; Ku-DiPietro 90+8'	Report	Bernardeschi 66' (pen.), (yellow card) 79'; Kaye 83'; Laryea (yellow card) 85'	Stadium: Audi Field; Attendance: 17,397; Referee: Ted Unkel

March 4 2	Columbus Crew	2–0	D.C. United	Columbus, OH
7:00 pm EST	Zelarayán 10', 44'; Yeboah (yellow card) 65'	Report	Najar (yellow card) 59'; Klich (yellow card) 84'	Stadium: Lower.com Field; Attendance: 20,391; Referee: Marcos de Oliveira

March 11 3	D.C. United	1–1	Orlando City SC	Washington, DC
7:30 pm EST	Asad (yellow card) 65'; Durkin 80'; Ruan (yellow card) 87'	Report	McGuire 53'; Smith (yellow card) 77'	Stadium: Audi Field; Attendance: 15,994; Referee: Jon Freemon

March 18 4	New York City FC	3–2	D.C. United	New York, NY
7:30 pm EST	Talles Magno 17'; Rodríguez 37', (yellow card) 53'; Pellegrini (yellow card) 73'; Andrade 88'	Report	Canouse (yellow card) 8'; Benteke 46'; Pálsson (yellow card) 49'; Jeahze (yellow card) 58'; Birnbaum 90'	Stadium: Yankee Stadium; Attendance: 17,281; Referee: Mark Allatin

March 25 5	D.C. United	1–2	New England Revolution	Washington, DC
7:30 pm EST	Benteke 45 ' Williams (yellow card) 58'	Report	Bou 63'; Bye (yellow card) 82'; Buck 88'	Stadium: Audi Field; Attendance: 16,509; Referee: Filip Dujic

April 1 6	Chicago Fire	0–0	D.C. United	Chicago, IL
8:30 pm EST		Report	Fountas (yellow card) 28'; Klich (yellow card) 74'	Stadium: Soldier Field; Attendance: 8,621; Referee: Pierre-Luc Lauziere

April 8 7	D.C. United	0–2	Columbus Crew	Washington, DC
7:30 pm EST	Canouse (yellow card) 45+5'; Benteke (yellow card) 58'; Klich (yellow card) 81'	Report	Zelarayán 39' (pen.) (yellow card) 45+1'; Ramirez 47'; Vallecilla (yellow card) 85'	Stadium: Audi Field; Attendance: 16,891; Referee: Rosendo Mendoza

April 15 8	CF Montréal	0–1	D.C. United	Montréal, QC
7:30 pm EST	Hamdi (yellow card) 25'; Iliadis (yellow card) 40'; Waterman (yellow card) 45+4'	Report	Pálsson (yellow card) 5'; O'Brien 46' (yellow card) 60'	Stadium: Stade Saputo; Attendance: 16,039; Referee: Joseph Dickerson

April 22 9	Orlando City SC	1–3	D.C. United	Orlando, FL
7:30 pm EST	McGuire 23'; Angulo (yellow card) 27'; Antônio Carlos (yellow card) 56'; Araújo (yellow card) 90+1'	Report	Ruan (yellow card) 11'; Fountas 15'; Klich (yellow card) 42'; Pines 52', (yellow card) 85'; Benteke 62'; Canouse (yellow card) 74'	Stadium: Exploria Stadium; Attendance: 19,514; Referee: Lukasz Szpala

April 29 10	D.C. United	3–0	Charlotte FC	Washington, DC
7:30 pm EDT	Najar (yellow card) 9'; Fountas 34' (pen.); Benteke (yellow card) 43' (goal) 75'; Greene 90+5'	Report	Jones (yellow card) 63'; Gaines (yellow card) 74'	Stadium: Audi Field; Attendance: 19,215; Referee: Ismir Pekmic

May 6 11	FC Cincinnati	2–1	D.C. United	Cincinnati, OH
7:30 pm EDT	Acosta (yellow card) 39' (goal) 59'; Mosquera (yellow card) 70'; Barreal 73'; Kubo (yellow card) 90+5'; Brenner (yellow card) 90+5'; Celentano (yellow card) 90+7'	Report	(yellow card) 21' Greene; (yellow card) 60' Benteke; 90' Fountas; (yellow card) 90+9' O'Brien	Stadium: TQL Stadium; Attendance: 25,513; Referee: Guido Gonzalez

May 13 12	D.C. United	1–1	Nashville SC	Washington, DC
7:30 pm EDT	Pines (yellow card) 46'; Ku-DiPietro 83'; Williams (yellow card) 85'	Report	Muyl (yellow card) 45+1' (goal) 73'; Mukhtar (yellow card) 54'	Stadium: Audi Field; Attendance: 19,215; Referee: Nima Saghafi

May 17 13	Philadelphia Union	0–0	D.C. United	Chester, PA
7:30 pm EDT	Carranza (yellow card) 9'; Martínez (yellow card) 90+3'	Report	Williams (yellow card) 48'	Stadium: Subaru Park; Attendance: 18,689; Referee: Pierre-Luc Lauziere

May 20 14	D.C. United	3–0	LA Galaxy	Washington, DC
7:30 pm EDT	Pines (yellow card) 65'; Benteke 71'; Dájome 73' (yellow card) 90'; Klich 80'	Report	Rodríguez (yellow card) 45+1'	Stadium: Audi Field; Attendance: 19,215; Referee: Fotis Bazakos

May 27 15	Toronto FC	2–1	D.C. United	Toronto, Ontario
7:30 pm EDT	Kerr 14'; Kaye (yellow card) 45+2'; Thompson 72'; Marshall-Rutty (yellow card) 90+5'	Report	Santos (yellow card) 69'; Benteke 87'	Stadium: BMO Field; Attendance: 27,065; Referee: Lukasz Szpala

May 31 16	D.C. United	2–2	CF Montréal	Washington, D.C.
7:30 pm EDT	Pines 44'; Ku-DiPietro 59'; O'Brien (yellow card) 84'	Report	Duke (yellow card) 51'; Ibrahim 80'; Lassiter 82'	Stadium: Audi Field; Attendance: 16,342; Referee: Alex Chilowicz

June 3 17	Inter Miami CF	1–2	D.C. United	Fort Lauderdale, FL
7:30 pm EDT	Miller (red card) 7'; Jean (yellow card) 12'; Fray (yellow card) 71', (goal) 90+2'; Campana (yellow card) 81'; Yedlin (yellow card) 89'	Report	Pedro Santos (yellow card) 12'; Benteke (yellow card) 45+1', (goal) 90'; Pines 76'	Stadium: DRV PNK Stadium; Attendance: 15,040; Referee: Marcos de Oliveira

June 10 18	Atlanta United FC	3–1	D.C. United	Atlanta, GA
7:30 pm EDT	Giakoumakis 13', (yellow card) 83'; Fortune (yellow card) 42'; Gutman 49'; Wolff 73'	Report	Fountas 27'; Pines (yellow card) 51'; Birnbaum (yellow card) 69'; Klich (yellow card) 89'	Stadium: Mercedes-Benz Stadium; Attendance: 42,539; Referee: Filip Dujic

June 17 19	D.C. United	1–2	Real Salt Lake	Washington, D.C.
7:30 pm EDT	Birnbaum (red card) 26'; Durkin (yellow card) 50', (goal) 53'; Dájome (yellow card) 75'; Hines-Ike (yellow card) 89'	Report	Ruiz (yellow card) 9', (goal) 41'; Musovski 51'; MacMath (yellow card) 90+1'	Stadium: Audi Field; Attendance: 19,215; Referee: Malik Badawi

June 24 20	D.C. United	3–0	FC Cincinnati	Washington, D.C.
7:30 pm EDT	Santos 10'; Williams 17'; Dájome 43'; Najar (yellow card) 64'	Report	Murphy (yellow card) 66' (yellow-red card) 79'	Stadium: Audi Field; Attendance: 18,864; Referee: Sergii Boiko

July 1 21	Nashville SC	2–0	D.C. United	Nashville, Tennessee
8:30 pm EDT	Leal 18', (yellow card) 34', (goal) 37'; Zimmerman (yellow card) 20' (yellow-red card) 64'; Bunbury (yellow card) 66'	Report	Benteke (yellow card) 39'; Fountas (yellow card) 74'	Stadium: Geodis Park; Attendance: 30,109; Referee: Guido Gonzales Jr.

July 4 22	FC Dallas	0–1	D.C. United	Frisco, Texas
8:30 pm EDT		Report	Canouse (yellow card) 28'; O'Brien (yellow card) 45+1'; Fountas 73'; Klich (yellow card) 90+11'	Stadium: Toyota Stadium; Attendance: 19,096; Referee: Mark Allatin

July 8 23	D.C. United	2–2	Inter Miami CF	Washington, D.C.
7:30 pm EDT	Asad (yellow card) 18'; Fountas 65', (yellow card) 70'; Robertha 77'; Pines (yellow card) 90'	Report	Arroyo (yellow card) 2'; Kryvtsov (yellow card) 45+6'; Cremaschi 59'; Allen 68'; Ruíz (yellow card) 90+4'	Stadium: Audi Field; Attendance: 19,215; Referee: Rosendo Mendoza

July 15 24	New England Revolution	4–0	D.C. United	Foxborough, Massachusetts
7:30 pm EDT	Wood (yellow card) 33'; Bou 45'; Harkes 45+7', 49'; Hines-Ike 73' (o.g.)	Report	Klich (yellow card) 61' (yellow-red card) 90+1'	Stadium: Gillette Stadium; Attendance: 29,884; Referee: Ismir Pekmic

August 20 25	New York Red Bulls	1–0	D.C. United	Harrison, New Jersey
7:30 pm EDT	Yearwood (yellow card) 44'; Reyes (yellow card) 78'; Duncan (yellow card) 82'; Tolkin 88'	Report	Durkin (yellow card) 36'; Williams (yellow card) 54'	Stadium: Red Bull Arena; Attendance: 17,872; Referee: Jon Freemon

August 26 26	D.C. United	1–3	Philadelphia Union	Washington, D.C.
7:30 pm EDT	Miller (yellow card) 36'; Ku-DiPietro 88'	Report	Uhre 5'; McGlynn 13'; Gazdag 38' (pen.); Harriel (yellow card) 68'; Glesnes (yellow card) 76'; Donovan (yellow card) 90+4'	Stadium: Audi Field; Attendance: 19,215; Referee: Marcos de Oliveira

September 2 27	D.C. United	4–0	Chicago Fire FC	Washington, D.C.
7:30 pm EDT	Benteke 9', 90+1'; Ku-DiPietro 20'; Terán 40' (o.g.)	Report	F. Navarro (yellow card) 21'	Stadium: Audi Field; Attendance: 16,075; Referee: Sergii Boiko

September 9 28	D.C. United	0–0	San Jose Earthquakes	Washington, D.C.
7:30 pm EDT	Santos (yellow card) 65'	Report	Munie (yellow card) 51'; Rodrigues (yellow card) 57'; Ebobisse (yellow card) 63'; Beason (red card) 90'	Stadium: Audi Field; Attendance: 17,255; Referee: Tori Penso

September 16 29	Charlotte FC	0–0	D.C. United	Charlotte, North Carolina
7:30 pm EDT		Report	Canouse (yellow card) 33'; Ruan (yellow card) 70'; Hines-Ike (yellow card) 75'	Stadium: Bank of America Stadium; Attendance: 36,101; Referee: Jon Freemon

September 20 30	D.C. United	1–1	Atlanta United FC	Washington, D.C.
7:30 pm EDT	Pirani 80'; Benteke (yellow card) 85'; Asad (yellow card) 88'	Report	Lobjanidze 14'; Fortune (yellow card) 61'; Mosquera (yellow card) 77'; Silva (yellow card) 89'	Stadium: Audi Field; Attendance: 15,762; Referee: Lukasz Szpala

September 23 31	D.C. United	3–5	New York Red Bulls	Washington, D.C.
7:30 pm EDT	Benteke 21', 36', 45+2' (pen.), (yellow card) 83'; Canouse (yellow card) 25'; Hines-Ike (yellow card) 55'	Report	Fernandez 17', 44' (pen.); Harper 45+5'; Nealis 58', (yellow card) 66'; Duncan (yellow card) 64'; Tolkin 90+3'	Stadium: Audi Field; Attendance: 12,591; Referee: Alex Chilowicz

September 30 32	Vancouver Whitecaps FC	2–2	D.C. United	Vancouver, British Columbia
10:30 pm EDT	White 2'; Gauld 57' (pen.); Schöpf (yellow card) 82'	Report	Benteke 11'; Klich 62', (yellow card) 69'	Stadium: BC Place; Attendance: 19,442; Referee: Drew Fischer

October 4 33	Austin FC	3–0	D.C. United	Austin, Texas
7:30 pm EDT	Bruin 11'; Driussi 21'; Hedges 64'	Report	Klich (yellow card) 82'	Stadium: Q2 Stadium; Attendance: 20,738; Referee: Jair Marrufo

October 7 34	D.C. United	2–0	New York City FC	Washington, D.C.
7:30 pm EDT	Klich 45', (yellow card) 90+2'; Birnbaum (yellow card) 45+1'; Durkin 62'; Canouse (yellow card) 67'	Report	O'Toole (yellow card) 75'; Perea (yellow card) 90+6'	Stadium: Audi Field; Attendance: 19,215; Referee: Fotis Bazakos

=== U.S. Open Cup ===
April 26 Third round	D.C. United (MLS) (Washington, D.C.)	1–0	(Virginia) Richmond Kickers (USL1)	Washington, D.C.
7:30 PM EDT	Asad 52' (pen.); Fletcher (yellow card) 60'	Report	Terzaghi (yellow card) 27'; O'Dwyer (yellow card) 79'; Aune (yellow card) 90'	Stadium: Audi Field; Attendance: 8,686; Referee: John Griggs

May 9 Round of 32	New York Red Bulls (MLS) (New Jersey)	1–0	(Washington, D.C.) D.C. United (MLS)	Montclair, New Jersey
7:30 PM EDT	Fernandez 28'	Report	Hurtado (yellow card) 36'; Sargis (yellow card) 66'; Akinmboni (yellow card) 77'	Stadium: MSU Soccer Park; Attendance: 2,396; Referee: Marcos de Oliveira

=== Leagues Cup ===
==== Group stage ====
Pos	Team	Pld	W	PW	PL	L	GF	GA	GD	Pts	Qualification	UNM	DCU	MTL
1	(Mexico) UNAM	2	1	0	1	0	5	2	+3	4	Advance to knockout stage	—	3–0	—
2	(United States) D.C. United	2	1	0	0	1	1	3	−2	3	Advance to knockout stage	—	—	—
3	(Canada) CF Montréal	2	0	1	0	1	2	3	−1	2		2–2	0–1	—

Source: Leagues Cup
Rules for classification: Tiebreakers

July 26 GS	CF Montréal (Canada)	0–1	(United States) D.C. United	Montreal
7:30 pm EDT	Waterman (yellow card) 63'; Piette (yellow card) 65'	Report	Williams (yellow card) 38'; Hurtado 70'	Stadium: Saputo Stadium; Attendance: 19,619; Referee: Filip Dujic

July 29 GS	D.C. United (United States)	0–3	(Mexico) UNAM	Washington, D.C.
8:30 pm EDT	Dájome (yellow card) 56'; Asad (yellow card) 83'	Report	Huerta 6'; Silva 42'; Fernández 52'	Stadium: Audi Field; Attendance: 14,599; Referee: Oshane Nation

==== Knockout stage ====
August 3 Round of 32	Philadelphia Union (United States)	0–0 (5–4 p)	(United States) D.C. United	Chester, Pennsylvania
8:00 pm EDT	Gazdag (yellow card) 67'; Mbaizo (yellow card) 73'; Elliott (yellow card) 88'	Report		Stadium: Subaru Park; Attendance: 17,731; Referee: Rosendo Mendoza
	Penalties
	Gazdag (penalty missed); Carranza (penalty scored); Elliott (penalty scored); McGlynn (penalty scored); Bueno (penalty scored); Mbaizo (penalty scored)		(penalty scored) Benteke; (penalty scored) Klich; (penalty scored) Williams; (penalty missed) Durkin; (penalty scored) Davis; (penalty missed) Santos

== Transfers ==
=== Transfers in ===
Date	Position	No.	Name	From	Fee/notes	Ref.
October 17, 2022	GK	50	(United States) Luis Zamudio	(United States) Loudoun United	Signed through 2024, with 2025 team option.	
November 10, 2022	DF	3	(Republic of Ireland) Derrick Williams	(United States) LA Galaxy	$180,000 in 2024 GAM to LA	
November 21, 2022	MF	7	(Portugal) Pedro Santos	(United States) Columbus Crew	Free Transfer, signed through 2024	
November 24, 2022	GK	1	(United States) Tyler Miller	(United States) Minnesota United FC	Free Transfer, signed through 2024	
December 7, 2022	DF	5	(Iraq) Mohanad Jeahze	(Sweden) Hammarby IF	Signed through 2025, with 2026 team option	
December 14, 2022	GK	24	(United States) Alex Bono	(Canada) Toronto FC	Free Transfer, signed through 2024 with 2025 team option	
December 21, 2022	DF	2	(Brazil) Ruan	(United States) Orlando City SC	Traded for #2 overall pick in the 2023 MLS SuperDraft	
January 12, 2023	MF	43	(Poland) Mateusz Klich	(England) Leeds United	Free Transfer, signed through 2024 with 2025 team option	
March 2, 2023	MF	22	(Argentina) Yamil Asad	(Chile) Universidad Católica	Signed through 2023 with 2024-25 team options	
April 24, 2023	FW	12	(Colombia) Cristian Dájome	(Canada) Vancouver Whitecaps FC	$350,000 GAM to Vancouver	
April 29, 2023	FW	9	(United States) Erik Hurtado	(United States) San Antonio FC	$10,000 to San Antonio, 2024 team option	
August 2, 2023	FW	84	(Panama) José Fajardo	(Peru) Cusco FC	Free Transfer	
August 2, 2023	DF	31	(Panama) Eric Davis	(Slovakia) DAC Dunajska Streda	Free Transfer	

=== Transfers out ===
Date	Position	No.	Name	To	Fee/notes	Ref.
November 14, 2022	FW	9	(Norway) Ola Kamara	(Sweden) Häcken	Out of contract	
November 14, 2022	GK	28	(United States) Bill Hamid	(United States) Memphis 901	Out of contract	
November 14, 2022	DF	93	(Mexico) Tony Alfaro	(United States) New York City FC	Option declined	
November 14, 2022	MF	13	(France) Sofiane Djeffal	(United States) Austin FC	Option declined, 2022 MLS Re-Entry Draft	
November 14, 2022	DF	97	(United States) Sami Guediri	(Algeria) ES Sétif	Option declined	
November 14, 2022	GK	21	(United States) Jon Kempin	N/A	Option declined, retired	
November 14, 2022	DF	3	(United States) Chris Odoi-Atsem	(United States) Alexandria Reds	Option declined	
November 14, 2022	FW	16	(United States) Adrien Perez	(United States) San Diego Loyal	Option declined	
November 14, 2022	DF	5	(Australia) Brad Smith	(United States) Houston Dynamo	Option declined	
November 14, 2022	FW	17	(England) Kimarni Smith	(United States) San Antonio FC	Option declined	
November 14, 2022	MF	12	(United States) Drew Skundrich	(United States) Colorado Springs Switchbacks	Option declined	
November 23, 2022	GK	32	(Mexico) David Ochoa	(Mexico) Atlético San Luis	Free Transfer	
January 19, 2023	GK	1	(Venezuela) Rafael Romo	(Ecuador) Universidad Católica	Mutual Termination	
February 19, 2023	FW	22	(Spain) Miguel Berry	(United States) Atlanta United FC	$250,000 GAM	
July 28, 2023	MF	44	(Iceland) Victor Pálsson	(Belgium) KAS Eupen	Undisclosed fee	
August 10, 2023	FW	11	(Greece) Taxiarchis Fountas	(Turkey) Trabzonspor	Mutual termination	

=== Loans in ===
No.	Pos.	Player	Loaned from	Start	End	Source
17	MF	(England) Lewis O'Brien	(England) Nottingham Forest	March 20, 2023	July 16, 2023	
10	MF	(Brazil) Gabriel Pirani	(Brazil) Santos FC	July 27, 2023	December 31, 2023	

=== Loan out ===
No.	Pos.	Player	Loaned to	Start	End	Source
18	MF	(El Salvador) Jeremy Garay	(United States) Loudoun United	March 10, 2023	November 30, 2023	
72	DF	(Ivory Coast) Gaoussou Samaké	(United States) Loudoun United	March 10, 2023	May 12, 2023	
30	DF	(United States) Hayden Sargis	(United States) Loudoun United	May 12, 2023	November 30, 2023	
25	MF	(United States) Jackson Hopkins	(United States) Loudoun United	May 20, 2023	July 25, 2023	
45	DF	(United States) Matai Akinmboni	(United States) Loudoun United	June 2, 2023	November 30, 2023	
50	GK	(United States) Luis Zamudio	(United States) Pittsburgh Riverhounds	June 16, 2023	July 17, 2023	

=== MLS SuperDraft picks ===
2023 D.C. United SuperDraft Picks
Round	Selection	Player	Position	College	Status
2	31	(United States) Ben Stitz	MF	Penn	Signed with FC Cincinnati 2
3	60	(United States) Aidan Rocha	MF	Georgetown	Signed with Loudoun United FC

== Statistics ==
=== Appearances and goals ===
Numbers after plus-sign(+) denote appearances as a substitute.

No.	Pos	Nat	Player	Total		MLS		U.S. Open Cup		Leagues Cup	
No.	Pos	Nat	Player	Apps	Goals	Apps	Goals	Apps	Goals	Apps	Goals
1	GK	(United States) USA	Tyler Miller	25	0	25+0	0	0+0	0	0+0	0
2	MF	(Brazil) BRA	Ruan	28	0	15+9	0	1+1	0	1+1	0
3	DF	(Republic of Ireland) IRL	Derrick Williams	27	1	21+3	1	0+0	0	3+0	0
4	DF	(United States) USA	Brendan Hines-Ike	16	0	9+3	0	1+0	0	3+0	0
5	DF	(Iraq) IRQ	Mohanad Jeahze	6	0	5+1	0	0+0	0	0+0	0
6	MF	(United States) USA	Russell Canouse	27	0	27+0	0	0+0	0	0+0	0
7	DF	(Portugal) POR	Pedro Santos	23	1	16+5	1	0+0	0	1+1	0
8	MF	(United States) USA	Chris Durkin	36	3	24+7	3	2+0	0	3+0	0
9	FW	(United States) USA	Erik Hurtado	10	1	1+6	0	1+0	0	0+2	1
10	MF	(Brazil) BRA	Gabriel Pirani	10	1	10+0	1	0+0	0	0+0	0
12	FW	(Colombia) COL	Cristian Dájome	23	2	7+12	2	1+0	0	3+0	0
14	DF	(Honduras) HON	Andy Najar	22	0	12+9	0	1+0	0	0+0	0
15	DF	(United States) USA	Steve Birnbaum	22	1	20+2	1	0+0	0	0+0	0
18	MF	(El Salvador) SLV	Jeremy Garay	0	0	0+0	0	0+0	0	0+0	0
19	FW	(Curaçao) CUW	Nigel Robertha	11	1	3+7	1	0+0	0	1+0	0
20	FW	(Belgium) BEL	Christian Benteke	34	14	31+0	14	0+0	0	2+1	0
21	MF	(United States) USA	Ted Ku-DiPietro	27	5	12+14	5	1+0	0	0+0	0
22	MF	(Argentina) ARG	Yamil Asad	26	1	5+16	0	2+0	1	2+1	0
23	DF	(United States) USA	Donovan Pines	26	3	21+1	3	0+1	0	3+0	0
24	GK	(United States) USA	Alex Bono	15	0	9+1	0	2+0	0	3+0	0
25	FW	(United States) USA	Jackson Hopkins	12	0	2+5	0	2+0	0	2+1	0
26	FW	(United States) USA	Kristian Fletcher	12	0	1+9	0	2+0	0	0+0	0
30	DF	(United States) USA	Hayden Sargis	4	0	0+2	0	2+0	0	0+0	0
31	DF	(Panama) PAN	Eric Davis Grajales	3	0	0+1	0	2+0	0	0+0	0
33	MF	(United States) USA	Jacob Greene	8	0	6+2	0	0+0	0	0+0	0
43	MF	(Poland) POL	Mateusz Klich	36	4	31+1	4	0+1	0	3+0	0
45	DF	(United States) USA	Matai Akinmboni	5	0	2+1	0	2+0	0	0+0	0
49	MF	(Jamaica) JAM	Ravel Morrison	0	0	0+0	0	0+0	0	0+0	0
50	GK	(United States) USA	Luis Zamudio	0	0	0+0	0	0+0	0	0+0	0
72	DF	(Ivory Coast) CIV	Gaoussou Samaké	7	0	5+0	0	0+0	0	2+0	0
77	MF	(Chile) CHI	Martín Rodríguez	0	0	0+0	0	0+0	0	0+0	0
84	FW	(Panama) PAN	José Fajardo	7	0	3+4	0	0+0	0	0+0	0
Players who left during the season
11	MF	(Greece) GRE	Taxiarchis Fountas	17	6	12+5	6	0+0	0	0+0	0
17	MF	(England) ENG	Lewis O'Brien	19	1	17+0	1	0+2	0	0+0	0
44	MF	(Iceland) ISL	Victor Pálsson	18	0	17+1	0	0+0	0	0+0	0
Total				39	47	34	45	2	1	3	1

- Last updated: October 8, 2023
- Source: Team Stats

=== Top scorers ===
Rank	Position	No.	Name	MLS	U.S. Open Cup	Leagues Cup	Total
1	FW	20	(Belgium) Christian Benteke	14	0	0	14
2	FW	11	(Greece) Taxiarchis Fountas	6	0	0	6
3	MF	21	(United States) Ted Ku-DiPietro	5	0	0	5
4	MF	43	(Poland) Mateusz Klich	4	0	0	4
5	DF	23	(United States) Donovan Pines	3	0	0	3
5	MF	8	(United States) Chris Durkin	3	0	0	3
7	FW	12	(Colombia) Cristian Dájome	2	0	0	2
8	9 players with 1 goal						
Total				44	1	1	46

- Last updated: April 12, 2023
- Source: Team Stats

=== Top assists ===
Rank	Position	No.	Name	MLS	U.S. Open Cup	Leagues Cup	Total
1	MF	43	(Poland) Mateusz Klich	7	0	0	7
2	DF	2	(Brazil) Ruan	5	0	0	5
3	FW	20	(Belgium) Christian Benteke	3	0	0	3
3	MF	21	(United States) Ted Ku-DiPietro	3	0	0	3
5	MF	8	(United States) Chris Durkin	2	0	0	2
5	MF	44	(Iceland) Victor Pálsson	2	0	0	2
7	6 players with 1 assist						
Total				28	0	0	28

- Last updated: April 12, 2023
- Source: Team Stats
