= Theodore Ku-DiPietro =

American soccer player (born 2002)

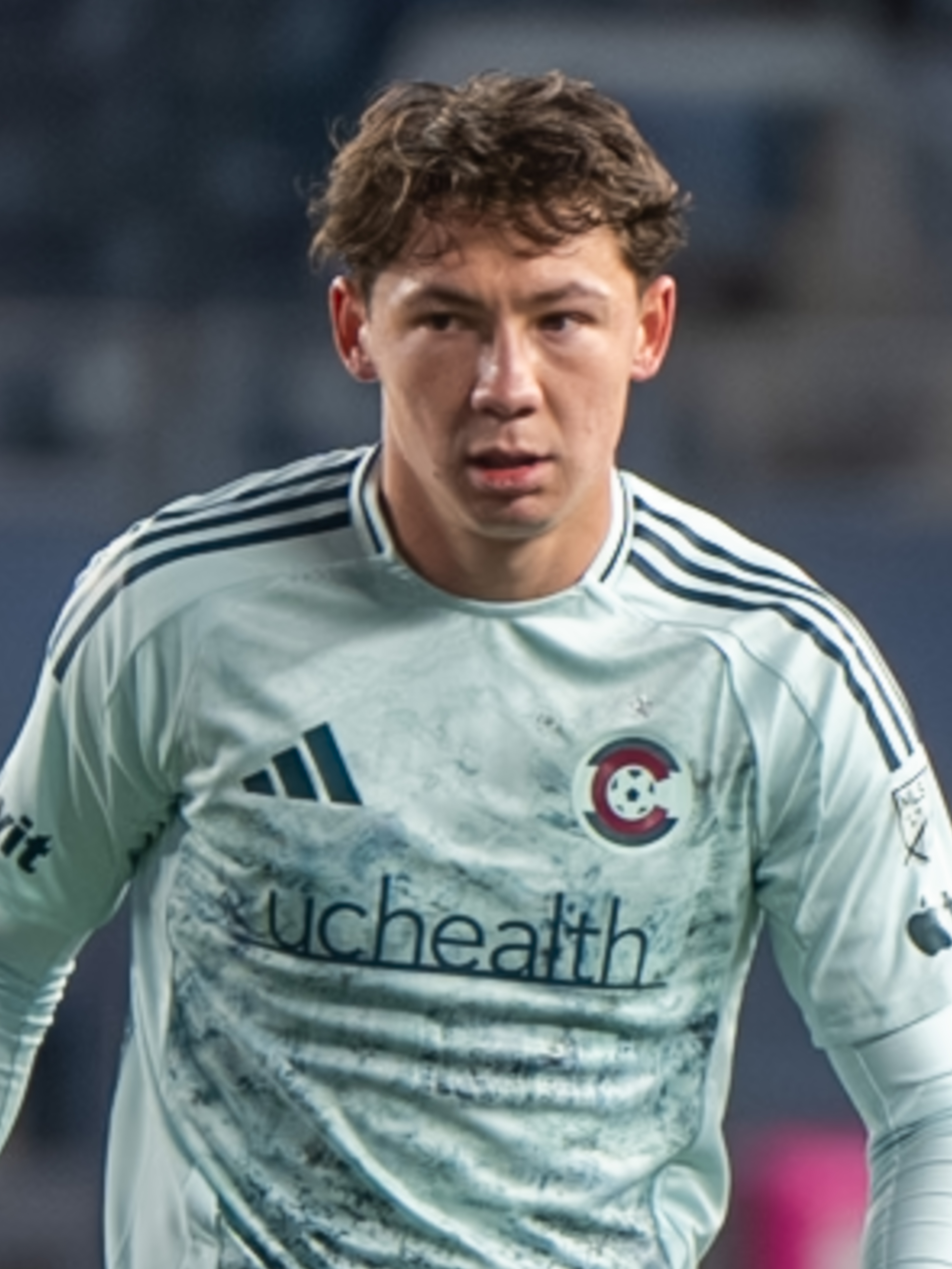
- Ku-DiPietro with the Colorado Rapids in 2026

Personal information
- Date of birth: January 28, 2002 (age 24)
- Place of birth: Oakton, Virginia, U.S.
- Height: 5 ft 10 in (1.78 m)
- Position: Midfielder

Team information
- Current team: Colorado Rapids
- Number: 21

Youth career
- –2019: D.C. United

Senior career*
Years	Team	Apps	(Gls)
2019–2022	Loudoun United	58	(11)
2022–2024	D.C. United	65	(7)
2025–	Colorado Rapids	16	(1)
2025–	Colorado Rapids 2	0	(0)

International career
2023	United States U23	5	(1)
- * Club domestic league appearances and goals as of 04:43, 6 August 2025 (UTC)

Theodore "Ted” Ku-DiPietro (born January 28, 2002) is an American professional soccer player who plays as a midfielder for Major League Soccer club Colorado Rapids.

== Early life ==
Ku-DiPietro was born on January 28, 2002, in Oakton, Virginia. He attended Oakton High School in Vienna, Virginia, where he was a standout soccer player. In 2018, as a sophomore, he was named first-team all-state. Ku-DiPietro is of Chinese descent through his mother, and Polish and German descent through his father. "DiPietro" is the last name of his adoptive Italian grandfather.

== Club career ==
=== Loudoun United ===
Ku-DiPietro played his first professional game with Loudoun United FC, on June 28, 2019, in a 2–1 win over Atlanta United 2. Ku-DiPietro scored his first-ever professional goal in his first season with Loudoun United FC, on September 25, 2019, in the 68th minute of the team's 4–1 win over the Swope Park Rangers. Ku-DiPietro also received his first-ever red card in the same match.

Ku-DiPietro signed his first professional contract with Loudoun on January 7, 2020.

=== D.C. United ===
After appearing three seasons with Loudoun, Ku-DiPietro became the 17th homegrown player to sign for D.C. United. In the opening match of the 2023 season, he scored his first goal for the club – the game-winning goal in a 3–2 comeback victory over Toronto. After coming on as a second-half substitute, Ku-DiPietro assisted on Christian Benteke's game-tying goal in the 90th minute before scoring himself. As a result, he was named to Major League Soccer's Team of the Matchday for week one.

== International career ==
He was called up to the United States U-23 team for the 2023 Pan American Games in Chile, and scored his first international goal as the United States came from behind to beat Honduras 2–1.

== Career statistics ==
=== Club ===
As of October 29, 2024

Club	Season	League			U.S. Open Cup		Other		Total	
Club	Season	Division	Apps	Goals	Apps	Goals	Apps	Goals	Apps	Goals
Loudoun United	2019	USL	9	1	—		—		9	1
Loudoun United	2020	USL	9	1	—		—		9	1
Loudoun United	2021	USL	30	7	—		—		30	7
Loudoun United	2022	USL	10	2	—		—		10	2
Loudoun United	Total		58	11	—		—		58	11
D.C. United	2022	MLS	10	0	2	0	—		12	0
D.C. United	2023	MLS	26	5	1	0	—		27	5
D.C. United	2024	MLS	28	2	0	0	2 (Note: Appearances in Leagues Cup)	1	30	3
D.C. United	Total		65	7	3	0	2	1	70	8
Career total			123	18	3	0	2	1	128	19

== Personal life ==
Ku-DiPietro was born into a family of nine children, and six (including himself) have played soccer at least at the youth level. His older brother, Michael, played for the Marymount Saints men's soccer team before graduating with a Business Administration degree. His younger sister, Hope, signed a letter of intent to play with the George Washington Colonials women's soccer team in the Fall 2023 season.
