= Darluis Paz =

Venezuelan footballer (born 2002)

Personal information
- Full name: Darluis Andrés Paz Ferrer
- Date of birth: 26 March 2002 (age 24)
- Place of birth: Maracaibo, Venezuela
- Height: 1.74 m (5 ft 9 in)
- Position: Midfielder

Youth career
- –2018: Deportivo La Guaira

Senior career*
Years	Team	Apps	(Gls)
2018–2020	Deportivo La Guaira	18	(1)
2021	Loudoun United	27	(1)
2022–2023	Deportivo La Guaira	22	(4)
2023	Zamora	7	(0)

International career^{‡}
2019	Venezuela U17	4	(0)
- * Club domestic league appearances and goals as of 23:00, 30 October 2021 (UTC) ‡ National team caps and goals as of 20:11, 4 May 2021 (UTC)

Darluis Andrés Paz Ferrer (born 26 March 2002) is a Venezuelan footballer who plays as a midfielder.

== Career statistics ==
=== Club ===
As of 03:02, 25 October 2021. (UTC).

Club	Season	League			Cup		Continental		Other		Total	
Club	Season	Division	Apps	Goals	Apps	Goals	Apps	Goals	Apps	Goals	Apps	Goals
Deportivo La Guaira	2018	Venezuelan Primera División	1	0	3 (Note: Appearances in the Copa Venezuela)	0	0	0	0	0	4	0
Deportivo La Guaira	2019	Venezuelan Primera División	7	1	1	1	0	0	0	0	8	2
Deportivo La Guaira	2020	Venezuelan Primera División	10	0	0	0	0	0	0	0	10	0
Deportivo La Guaira	Total		18	1	4	1	0	0	0	0	22	2
Loudoun United	2021	USL Championship	25	1	0	0	0	0	0	0	25	1
Career total			43	2	4	1	0	0	0	0	47	3
