= Christian Benteke =

Belgian footballer (born 1990)

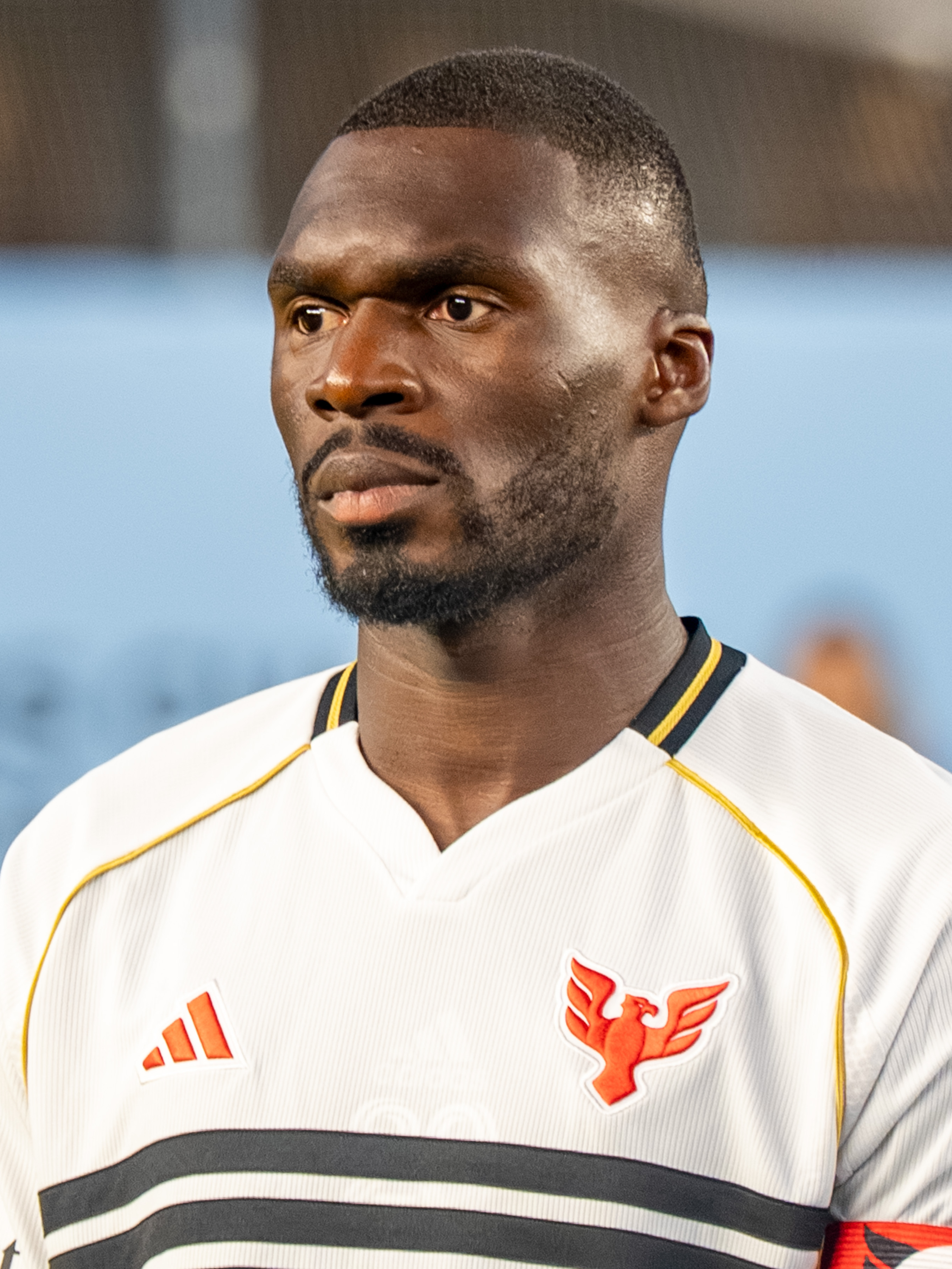
- Benteke with D.C. United in 2025

Personal information
- Full name: Christian Benteke Liolo
- Date of birth: 3 December 1990 (age 35)
- Place of birth: Kinshasa, Zaire
- Height: 1.90 m (6 ft 3 in)
- Position: Forward

Team information
- Current team: Al Wahda
- Number: 20

Youth career
- 1996–2004: JS Pierreuse
- 2004–2006: Standard Liège
- 2006–2007: Genk

Senior career*
Years	Team	Apps	(Gls)
2007–2009	Genk	10	(1)
2009–2011	Standard Liège	18	(3)
2009–2010	→ Kortrijk (loan)	34	(14)
2010–2011	→ Mechelen (loan)	18	(6)
2011–2012	Genk	37	(19)
2012–2015	Aston Villa	89	(42)
2015–2016	Liverpool	29	(9)
2016–2022	Crystal Palace	162	(35)
2022–2026	D.C. United	93	(47)
2026–	Al Wahda	0	(0)

International career
2007	Belgium U17	11	(6)
2007–2008	Belgium U18	7	(3)
2008–2009	Belgium U19	10	(10)
2009–2012	Belgium U21	9	(4)
2010–2022	Belgium	45	(18)
- * Club domestic league appearances and goals as of 03:24, 19 October 2025 (UTC)

Christian Benteke Liolo (born 3 December 1990) is a Belgian professional footballer who plays as a forward for UAE Pro League club Al Wahda.

Benteke began his career at Standard Liège, playing a part in their 2008–09 Belgian First Division triumph. Following a season at Genk he was signed for £7 million by Aston Villa. He scored 49 goals in 101 matches for Villa across all competitions. He spent a single season at Liverpool, scoring a total of 10 goals, before being transferred to Crystal Palace at the start of the 2016–17 season.

Benteke earned 45 caps for Belgium between his debut in 2010 and 2022. He missed the 2014 FIFA World Cup through injury, but was part of their team that reached the quarter-finals of UEFA Euro 2016 and Euro 2020.

== Early life ==
Benteke was born in Kinshasa in 1990. He and his family fled during the Mobutu regime and in 1993 emigrated to Liège, Belgium.

== Club career ==
=== Standard Liège and Genk ===
Benteke played youth football for JS Pierreuse and later Standard Liège before moving to Genk. He rejoined Standard in January 2009 and scored three goals in 12 matches as the Walloon club won the 2008–09 Belgian championship. On 7 August 2009, he joined KV Kortrijk on loan for a season, where he scored 14 goals in the Belgian Pro League, including five goals in the championship play-offs, as the club achieved its best ever finish.

He spent the following season on loan at KV Mechelen as part of the transfer of Aloys Nong, who moved from Mechelen to Standard Liège. Benteke's spell at Mechelen was less successful, with seven goals from 25 appearances. He returned to Genk from Standard in August 2011 for an undisclosed fee, and went on to score 16 goals and register nine assists in 20 starts during the 2011–12 season.

After beginning the 2012–13 season with three goals from five league matches, Benteke was subject of an offer of €6m from Premier League club Aston Villa in August 2012.

=== Aston Villa ===
==== 2012–13 season ====
On 31 August 2012, Benteke joined Premier League club Aston Villa on a four-year contract for a fee believed to be around £7 million.

On 15 September 2012, Benteke scored on his debut for Aston Villa in a 2–0 win against Swansea City, after coming on as a substitute for Austrian forward Andreas Weimann. The goal came when Swansea defender Ashley Williams headed the ball into Benteke's path, which he then lifted over the keeper and tapped in on the volley. Villa manager Paul Lambert praised Benteke's performance on his debut calling him "unplayable". He then scored Villa's only goal in a 1–1 home draw with Norwich City. He added a further two goals to his tally during a 3–2 victory over Swindon Town in the League Cup. He scored the winner in a 1–0 Premier League victory for Villa against Reading at Villa Park on 27 November to continue his impressive start in English football.

Benteke then scored Villa's fourth goal in a 4–1 League Cup win over Norwich City at Carrow Road. Benteke further added to his impressive start in Premier League football by scoring two goals in Villa's 3–1 win against Liverpool at Anfield on 15 December. In addition to the two goals, he also assisted Villa's second goal with a back-heel to Andreas Weimann. Paul Lambert said afterwards that 'Benteke has been unbelievable', after already stating midweek (post–Norwich) that 'you run out of things to say about the guy, how well he's performing and how young he is'. Around Christmas time, Tottenham Hotspur manager André Villas-Boas was reportedly interested in signing Benteke, referring to him as the season's "surprise package".

After not scoring for three games, Benteke scored Villa's first penalty kick in almost a year in a 2–2 draw away to Swansea City in Villa's first game of 2013. He recorded his 10th goal of the season with a 28-yard strike against West Midlands rivals West Bromwich Albion in a 2–2 draw at The Hawthorns. The goal was nominated for January's goal of the month competition on Match of the Day. He then netted Villa's first goal in their 2–1 League Cup semi-final victory over Bradford City. However, the victory was not enough as Bradford won 4–3 on aggregate to progress to the final. Former England striker Michael Owen called him one of the signings of the season and posted a tweet the day after the semi-final saying: 'I'm seriously impressed with Benteke. What a player.' Benteke continued his rich scoring form with a goal against Newcastle United and a brace against Everton, in a game that Villa had led 3–1 at one point but eventually finished 3–3. He racked up his 15th goal in all competitions, as well as tallying six goals in five games, when he scored a penalty in a 2–1 victory against West Ham United on 10 February 2013. This was Villa's first league victory in eight games, since Benteke inspired the win against Liverpool back in December.

Benteke scored a deflected goal in a 2–1 victory at Reading, scoring the club's 1,000th goal in the Premier League in the process. The following week he went on to score a goal that sealed a 3–2 win over Queens Park Rangers. He then scored the third goal to seal a 3–1 win against relegation rivals Stoke City at the Britannia Stadium. Benteke was nominated for the PFA Young Player of the Year after his excellent debut season, eventually finishing as runner-up to eventual double award winner Gareth Bale. On 29 April, Benteke scored his first hat-trick for Aston Villa in a 6–1 thrashing of Sunderland. These goals also saw him exceed Dwight Yorke's record for most Premier League goals in a season (18) by an Aston Villa player and pass the 20 goal mark in all competitions, becoming the first player to do so for Villa since Juan Pablo Ángel in the 2003–04 season.

On 11 May, Benteke scored Villa's only goal in a 2–1 loss to Chelsea but in the second half he was sent off after receiving his second yellow card for a high boot on John Terry, meaning he would miss the last game of the season.

==== 2013–14 season ====
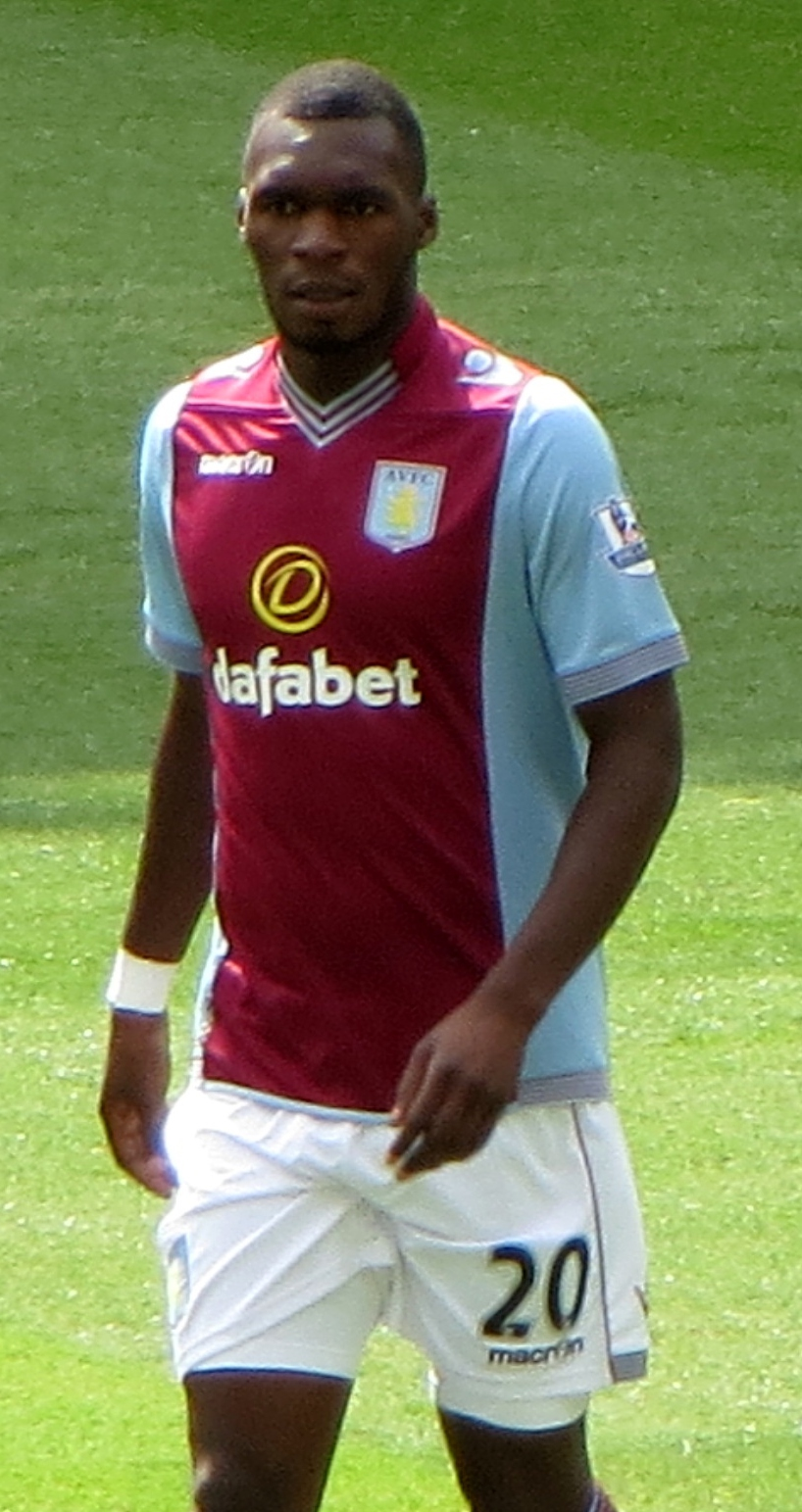
Benteke playing for Aston Villa in 2013

Benteke's 23 goals in 2012–13 led to speculation about his future, and in early July he submitted a transfer request. Villa said he could leave only if their valuation were met, but a fortnight later he withdrew his transfer request, after talks with manager Paul Lambert, and signed a new four-year contract with the club. On his second pre-season appearance, he scored a hat-trick against Crewe Alexandra in a 5–1 victory. He finished pre-season with seven goals in five appearances, including two goals against Málaga at Villa Park.

On 17 August 2013, Benteke scored twice, once from a penalty and one headed goal via a rebound from a missed penalty, in Aston Villa's 3–1 away-win against Arsenal on the opening day of the 2013–14 Premier League season.

Four days later, Benteke scored against Chelsea at Stamford Bridge in a 2–1 defeat. He scored his fourth goal in as many games, as Villa comfortably beat League One side Rotherham United 3–0 in the League Cup second round. He continued scoring, as he racked up his fifth goal in all competitions, against Newcastle United in a 2–1 defeat at Villa Park. However his brilliant early season form was abruptly ended, as he was injured in the next match against Norwich City. It was later confirmed that he would be out for up to six weeks with a hip flexor injury. However, he made his comeback earlier than expected, after coming on as a substitute against Tottenham Hotspur a month later in a 2–0 defeat.

After loss of form and nagging injuries prevented Benteke scoring for 12 games (his last goal being against Newcastle on 14 September), he eventually ended his drought against Arsenal in a 1–2 defeat on 13 January 2014. He followed this up with goals in back-to-back games against Liverpool and West Bromwich Albion, in a 2–2 draw and 4–3 victory respectively. Having not scored throughout February, the Belgian then scored a superb overhead volley as well as a header, in an eventual 4–1 home victory against Norwich City on 2 March.

On 3 April 2014, Benteke suffered a rupture of his achilles tendon while training and was ruled out for at least six months, missing the remainder of the season and the 2014 FIFA World Cup.

==== 2014–15 season ====
On 2 November 2014, Benteke was given a straight red card by referee Neil Swarbrick for pushing the face of Tottenham Hotspur's Ryan Mason after Mason had stuck his face in Benteke's chest. Villa had been winning at the time, but went on to lose 2–1. The incident led to both clubs being fined £20,000 by The FA for failing to keep their players under control.

He scored his second goal of the season against Manchester United in a 1–1 draw at Villa Park. It took him until early March to score his next goal, a 94th-minute penalty in a local derby against rivals West Bromwich Albion. On 7 April, he scored his second Premier League hat-trick in a 3–3 draw with Queens Park Rangers. Twelve days later, he equalised as Villa came from behind to defeat Liverpool and reach the 2015 FA Cup Final, their first for fifteen years.

On 2 May, he scored twice in a 3–2 win at home to Everton, taking him to a total of eleven goals in nine matches since the arrival of Tim Sherwood as manager. Six days later, Benteke was announced as the Premier League Player of the Month for April. He played the full 90 minutes in the FA Cup Final as Villa lost 4–0 to Arsenal, being beaten to a header by Per Mertesacker for the third goal of the rout.

=== Liverpool ===
On 22 July 2015, Liverpool completed the signing of Benteke on a "long-term contract" after meeting his release clause of £32.5 million, at the time making him their second most expensive transfer ever. He made his debut on 2 August in a pre-season friendly at Swindon Town, putting Liverpool into the lead with a volley as they went on to win 2–1.

On 9 August, Benteke made his competitive debut by starting in a 1–0 win at Stoke City. Eight days later he scored his first league goal for Liverpool in a 1–0 home win over newly promoted Bournemouth. On 12 September, he scored an overhead kick in a 3–1 defeat to rivals Manchester United.

After missing several games through injury, Benteke returned to score in consecutive games as a substitute on 25 and 31 October: a 1–1 draw against Southampton and a 3–1 away win against Chelsea. On 26 December, he replaced compatriot Divock Origi in the first half of a home fixture against league leaders Leicester City, and scored the only goal in a victory that curtailed the visitors' nine-game unbeaten run.

On 8 January 2016, Benteke was named as captain for Liverpool's FA Cup third round tie with Exeter City at St James Park.

On 11 May 2016, Benteke scored his tenth goal of his only season at Liverpool with a 92nd-minute equaliser in the team's final home game of 2015–16, a 1–1 draw with Chelsea. Benteke was often found on the bench because he wasn't fitting into Jürgen Klopp's style of play. Because of this, he ended his stint at Liverpool after making 42 appearances and scoring 10 goals.

=== Crystal Palace ===
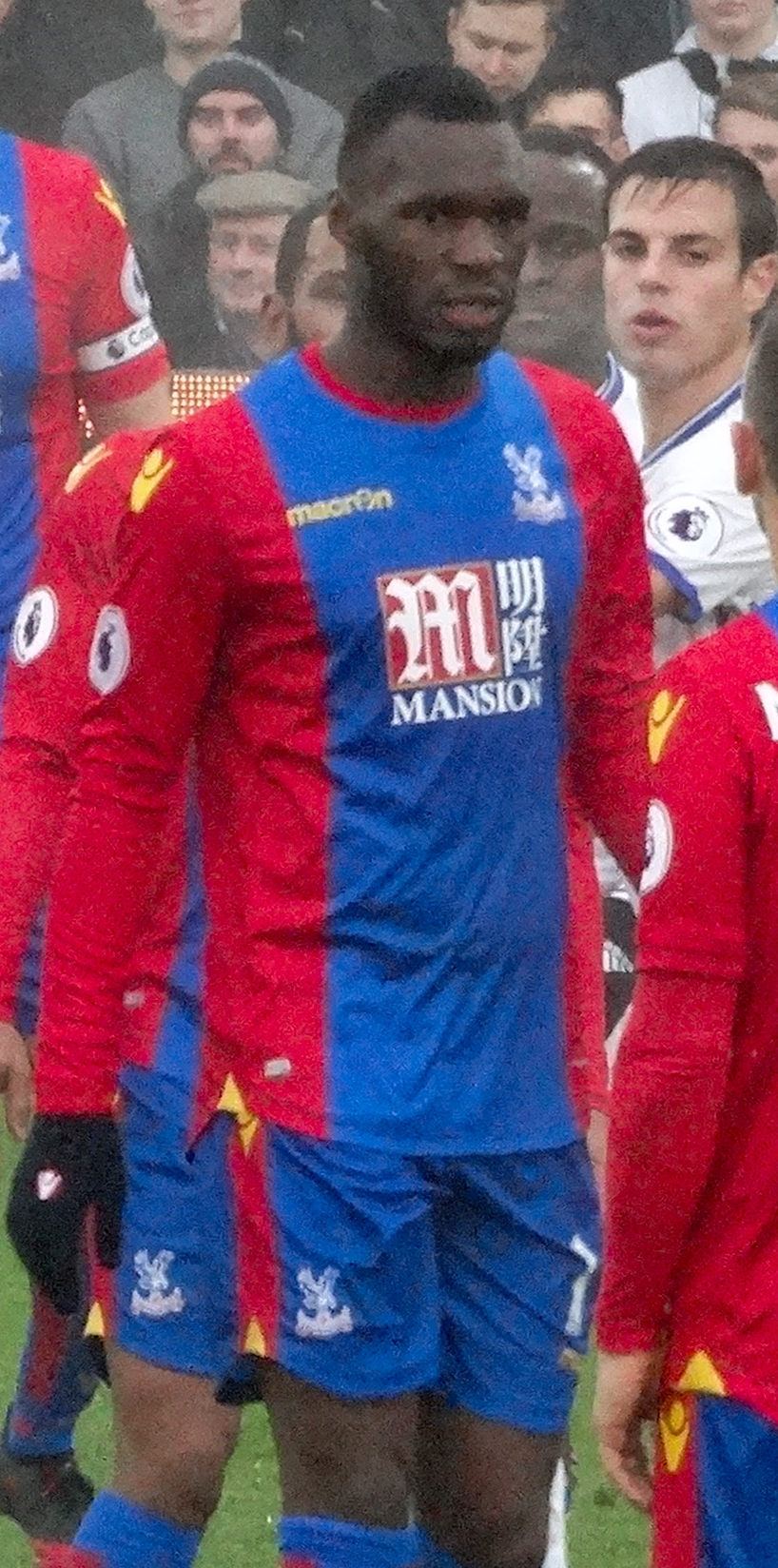
Benteke playing for Crystal Palace in 2016

On 20 August 2016, fellow Premier League side Crystal Palace completed the signing of Benteke on a four-year contract for a fee of £27m which could rise by a further £5m, bringing the total fee to £32m. On 10 September 2016, Benteke scored his first goal for Palace in a 2–1 victory against Middlesbrough, in his second league game. On 24 September 2016, Benteke headed home a goal against Sunderland in the 94th minute to cap Palace's comeback from 2–0 down to win 3–2.

On 3 December 2016 (Benteke's birthday), he scored twice in a 3–0 win over Southampton that ended Palace's run of six consecutive defeats. Benteke marked his return to Anfield, the ground of his former club Liverpool, with two goals in a 2–1 win on 23 April 2017. He finished his first season with Palace as their top-scorer, with 15 league goals and 17 in total.

The next season was less successful, with Benteke not scoring until December, and finishing the season with just three league goals in 30 appearances. In an injury-affected 2018–19 season, Benteke scored once in 19 appearances in all competitions and had not scored by October of the 2019–20 campaign. Despite this loss of form, in that same month, he signed a contract extension keeping him at Crystal Palace until the end of the 2020–21 season.

On 16 May 2021, Benteke headed in a goal against his former club Aston Villa as Palace twice came from a goal-behind to win 3–2. It was Benteke's 31st headed goal in the Premier League, joining the top-10 all-time list, equal with Tim Cahill. With a goal against Arsenal in Palace's next match, Benteke scored in four consecutive Premier League games for the first time in over eight years.

In June 2021, Benteke signed a further contract extension until the end of the 2022–23 season.

=== D.C. United ===
In August 2022, Benteke signed for MLS club D.C. United as a Designated Player on a two-and-a-half-year contract. On 18 September 2022, Benteke scored his first goal for DC United in a 1–0 win over Inter Miami. He ended the 2022 season with D.C. United tallying one goal in seven appearances. On 29 April 2023, in a game against Charlotte FC, Benteke scored an over-the-head bicycle kick to lead D.C. United to a 3–1 win. Benteke received his first MLS Goal of the Matchday for his goal and was named to MLS Team of the Matchday, his third of the season. On 23 September, Benteke netted his first hat-trick for the club in a 5–3 loss to the New York Red Bulls. He finished his first full season with D.C. tallying 14 goals in 31 appearances.

In the opening game of the 2024 MLS season on 24 February 2024, Benteke scored a hat-trick against rival club New England Revolution, securing a 3–1 victory. He would score his second hat-trick of the season in a 3–2 win at Atlanta United on 11 May, a feat which awarded him player of the matchday for the second time in the season. Benteke would finish the season winning the 2024 MLS Golden Boot with 23 goals scored across 30 appearances and set the club's record for the most goals scored, 25, across all competitions in a single season.

D.C. United declined Benteke's 2026 contract option, but attempted to sign him to a new deal at the end of the 2025 season. However, Benteke announced on social media that he would be leaving the team at the expiration of his contract. In his statement, Benteke expressed gratitude to D.C. United and its supporters, but wrote that he was "ready for the next chapter".

=== Al Wahda ===
On 1 January 2026, Benteke joined UAE Pro League club Al Wahda.

== International career ==
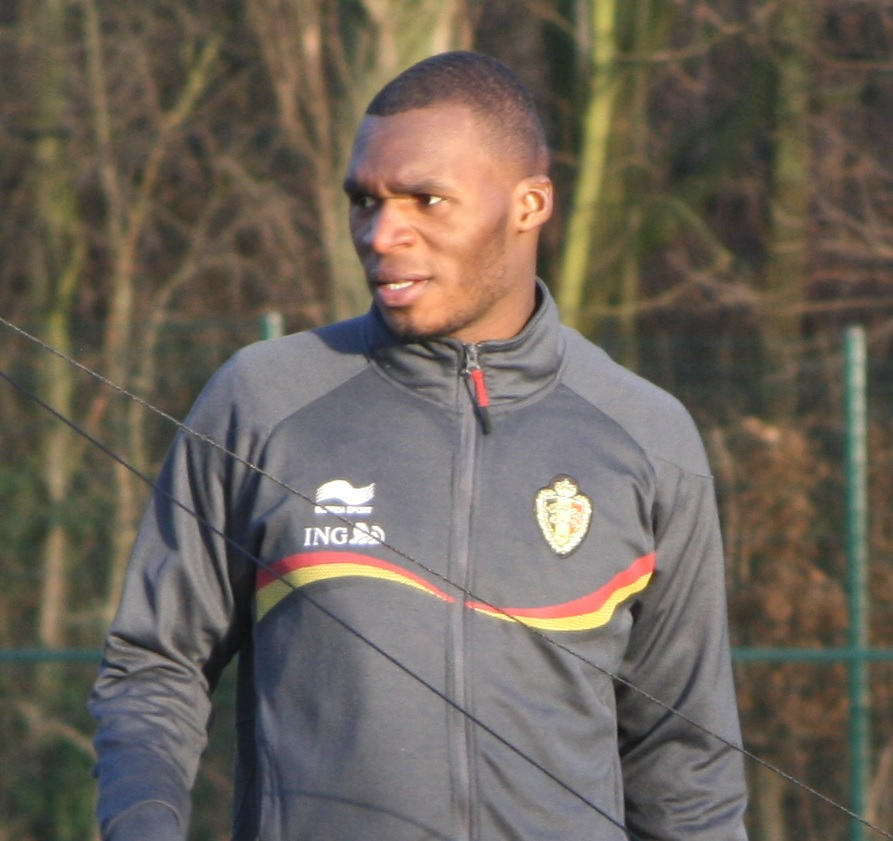
Benteke with Belgium in 2013

Benteke was a member of the Belgium U17 team at the 2007 FIFA U-17 World Cup in South Korea where he played three games and scored once.

On 19 May 2010, he made his senior debut for the Belgium national team in a friendly match against Bulgaria in Brussels after his former coach at Kortrijk, Georges Leekens, became national coach. On 15 August 2012, he scored his first goal in a 4–2 win against the Netherlands. Since then, he has become a regular starter for Belgium under Marc Wilmots. On 29 May 2013, he scored twice in a 4–2 friendly victory against the United States in Cleveland, Ohio.

He scored two goals in seven appearances during qualifying for the 2014 FIFA World Cup, but was ruled out of the tournament finals with a ruptured Achilles tendon.

Benteke returned to Belgium's squad for the UEFA Euro 2016 qualifying campaign, scoring his first international goal for two years in a 5–0 defeat of Cyprus on 28 March 2015. He was selected for the final tournament in France, and made his tournament debut in the second group game on 18 June, replacing Romelu Lukaku for the last seven minutes of a 3–0 win over the Republic of Ireland in Bordeaux. He played three more minutes in place of the same player four days later in a victory over Sweden, but took no further part as the Belgians reached the quarter-finals and lost to Wales. On 10 October 2016, Benteke set a record for the fastest goal in a World Cup match—either qualifying or the finals—when he scored after 8.1 seconds against Gibraltar in a 2018 FIFA World Cup qualifying match, breaking the 23-year-old record previously held by Davide Gualtieri. He scored twice more to complete his first hat-trick for Belgium.

He was left out of the final Belgium 23-man squad for the 2018 FIFA World Cup despite initially being named in the preliminary squad.

On 17 May 2021, Benteke was included in the final 26-man squad for the re-arranged UEFA Euro 2020.

== Personal life ==
Benteke is a Christian and supports Arsenal.

== Media ==
Benteke's goal celebration, which features him beating his chest, is taken from LeBron James. The celebration appears in EA Sports' video game FIFA 18.

== Career statistics ==
=== Club ===
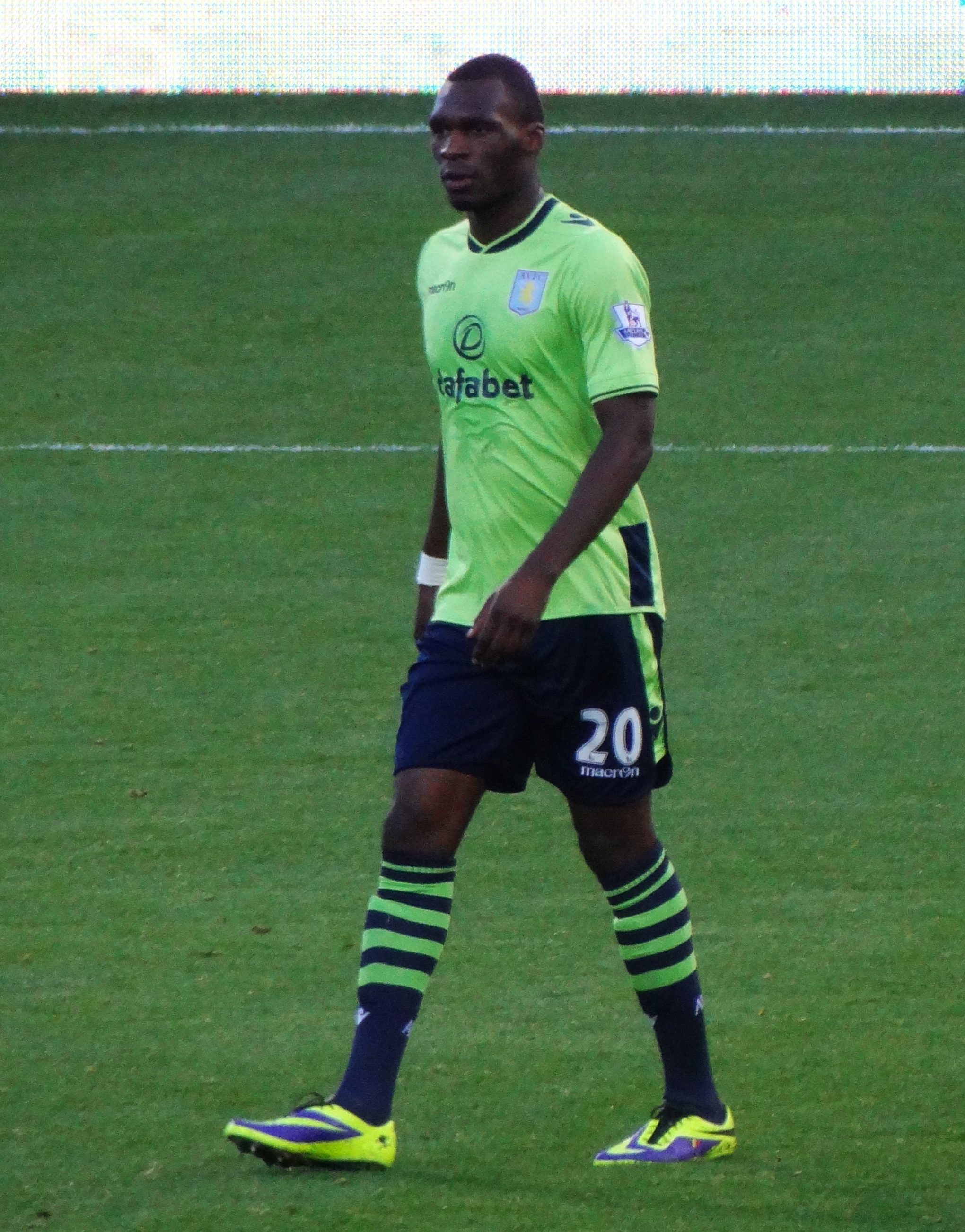
Benteke playing for Aston Villa in 2013

As of match played 18 October 2025

Appearances and goals by club, season and competition
Club	Season	League			National cup (Note: Includes Belgian Cup, FA Cup, U.S. Open Cup)		League cup (Note: Includes Football League/EFL Cup)		Continental		Other		Total	
Club	Season	Division	Apps	Goals	Apps	Goals	Apps	Goals	Apps	Goals	Apps	Goals	Apps	Goals
Genk	2007–08	Belgian Pro League	7	1	0	0	—		0	0	—		7	1
Genk	2008–09	Belgian Pro League	3	0	0	0	—		—		—		3	0
Genk	Total		10	1	0	0	—		0	0	—		10	1
Standard Liège	2008–09	Belgian Pro League	9	3	0	0	—		2 (Note: Appearances in UEFA Cup)	0	—		11	3
Standard Liège	2010–11	Belgian Pro League	5	0	0	0	—		—		—		5	0
Standard Liège	2011–12	Belgian Pro League	4	0	0	0	—		4 (Note: Two appearances in UEFA Champions League, two appearances in UEFA Europa League)	0	1 (Note: Appearance in Belgian Super Cup)	0	9	0
Standard Liège	Total		18	3	0	0	—		6	0	1	0	25	3
Kortrijk (loan)	2009–10	Belgian Pro League	34	14	4	2	—		—		—		38	16
Mechelen (loan)	2010–11	Belgian Pro League	18	6	2	1	—		—		—		20	7
Genk	2011–12	Belgian Pro League	32	16	1	0	—		0	0	—		33	16
Genk	2012–13	Belgian Pro League	5	3	0	0	—		3 (Note: Appearances in UEFA Europa League)	1	—		8	4
Genk	Total		37	19	1	0	—		3	1	—		41	20
Aston Villa	2012–13	Premier League	34	19	0	0	5	4	—		—		39	23
Aston Villa	2013–14	Premier League	26	10	1	0	1	1	—		—		28	11
Aston Villa	2014–15	Premier League	29	13	5	2	0	0	—		—		34	15
Aston Villa	Total		89	42	6	2	6	5	—		—		101	49
Liverpool	2015–16	Premier League	29	9	4	0	2	0	7	1	—		42	10
Crystal Palace	2016–17	Premier League	36	15	2	2	2	0	—		—		40	17
Crystal Palace	2017–18	Premier League	31	3	0	0	0	0	—		—		31	3
Crystal Palace	2018–19	Premier League	16	1	3	0	0	0	—		—		19	1
Crystal Palace	2019–20	Premier League	24	2	0	0	1	0	—		—		25	2
Crystal Palace	2020–21	Premier League	30	10	1	0	0	0	—		—		31	10
Crystal Palace	2021–22	Premier League	25	4	5	0	1	0	—		—		31	4
Crystal Palace	Total		162	35	11	2	4	0	—		—		177	37
D.C. United	2022	Major League Soccer	7	1	—		—		—		—		7	1
D.C. United	2023	Major League Soccer	31	14	0	0	—		—		3 (Note: Appearances in Leagues Cup)	0	34	14
D.C. United	2024	Major League Soccer	30	23	—		—		—		3	2	33	25
D.C. United	2025	Major League Soccer	25	9	1	0	—		—		—		26	9
D.C. United	Total		93	47	1	0	—		—		6	2	100	49
Al Wahda	2025–26	UAE Pro League	0	0	0	0	0	0	0	0	0	0	0	0
Career total			490	175	29	7	12	5	16	2	7	2	554	191

=== International ===
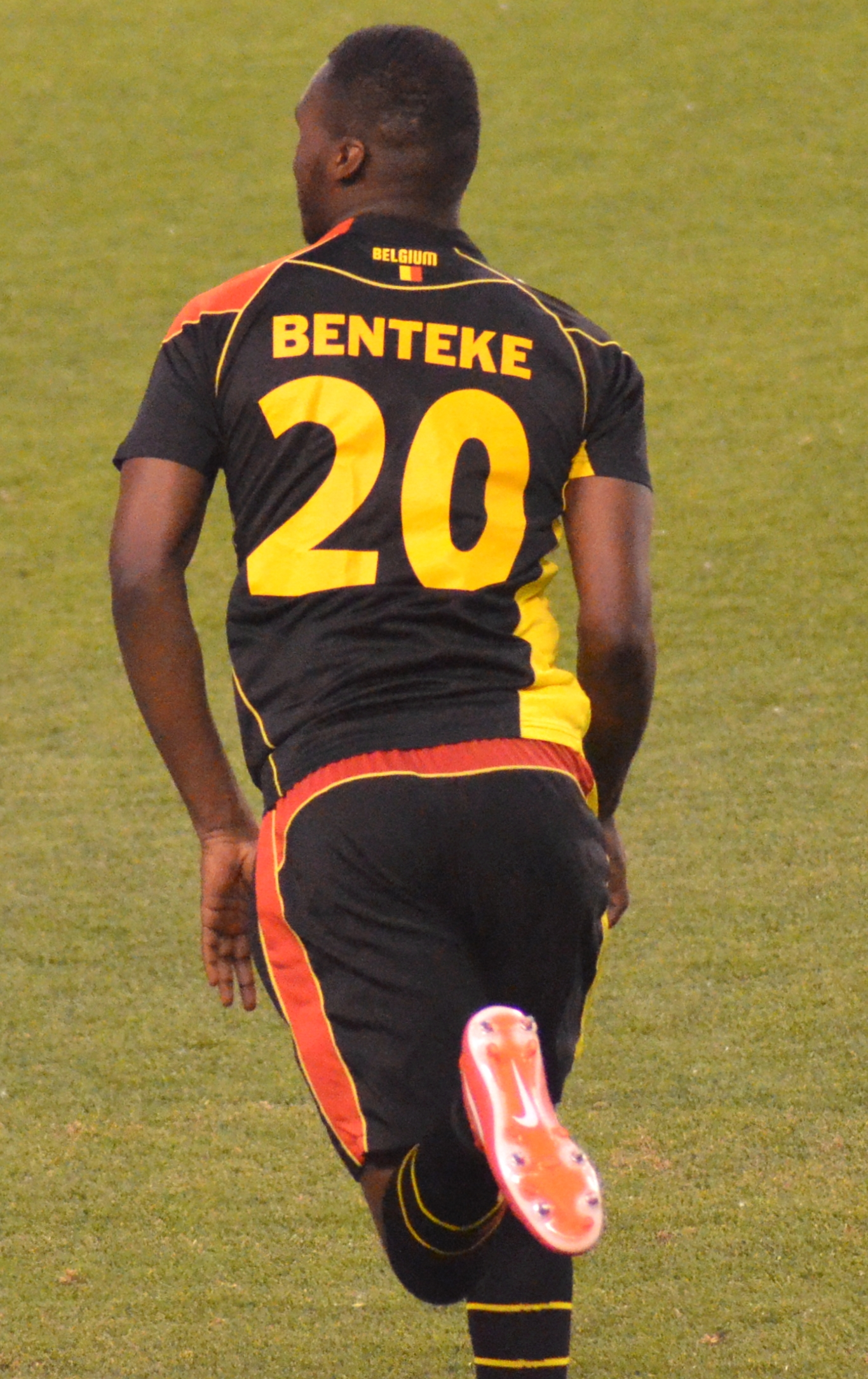
Benteke playing for Belgium in 2013

As of match played 29 March 2022

Appearances and goals by national team and year
National team	Year	Apps	Goals
Belgium	2010	3	0
Belgium	2011	0	0
Belgium	2012	6	4
Belgium	2013	8	2
Belgium	2014	3	0
Belgium	2015	5	1
Belgium	2016	6	3
Belgium	2017	2	2
Belgium	2018	1	0
Belgium	2019	3	3
Belgium	2020	1	0
Belgium	2021	5	2
Belgium	2022	2	1
Total		45	18

As of match played 29 March 2022
Scores and results list Belgium's goal tally first, score column indicates score after each Benteke goal

List of international goals scored by Christian Benteke
No.	Date	Venue	Cap	Opponent	Score	Result	Competition
1	15 August 2012	King Baudouin Stadium, Brussels, Belgium	5	Netherlands	1–0	4–2	Friendly
2	12 October 2012	Red Star Stadium, Belgrade, Serbia	7	Serbia	1–0	3–0	2014 FIFA World Cup qualification
3	16 October 2012	King Baudouin Stadium, Brussels, Belgium	8	Scotland	1–0	2–0	2014 FIFA World Cup qualification
4	14 November 2012	Arena Națională, Bucharest, Romania	9	Romania	1–0	1–2	Friendly
5	29 May 2013	FirstEnergy Stadium, Cleveland, United States	12	United States	2–1	4–2	Friendly
6	29 May 2013	FirstEnergy Stadium, Cleveland, United States	12	United States	4–1	4–2	Friendly
7	28 March 2015	King Baudouin Stadium, Brussels, Belgium	20	Cyprus	2–0	5–0	UEFA Euro 2016 qualification
8	10 October 2016	Estádio Algarve, Faro/Loulé, Portugal	30	Gibraltar	1–0	6–0	2018 FIFA World Cup qualification
9	10 October 2016	Estádio Algarve, Faro/Loulé, Portugal	30	Gibraltar	3–0	6–0	2018 FIFA World Cup qualification
10	10 October 2016	Estádio Algarve, Faro/Loulé, Portugal	30	Gibraltar	5–0	6–0	2018 FIFA World Cup qualification
11	28 March 2017	Fisht Olympic Stadium, Sochi, Russia	32	Russia	1–2	3–3	Friendly
12	28 March 2017	Fisht Olympic Stadium, Sochi, Russia	32	Russia	1–3	3–3	Friendly
13	10 October 2019	King Baudouin Stadium, Brussels, Belgium	35	San Marino	7–0	9–0	UEFA Euro 2020 qualification
14	19 November 2019	King Baudouin Stadium, Brussels, Belgium	37	Cyprus	1–1	6–1	UEFA Euro 2020 qualification
15	19 November 2019	King Baudouin Stadium, Brussels, Belgium	37	Cyprus	6–1	6–1	UEFA Euro 2020 qualification
16	30 March 2021	Den Dreef, Leuven, Belgium	39	Belarus	6–0	8–0	2022 FIFA World Cup qualification
17	13 November 2021	King Baudouin Stadium, Brussels, Belgium	43	Estonia	1–0	3–1	2022 FIFA World Cup qualification
18	29 March 2022	Constant Vanden Stock Stadium, Anderlecht, Belgium	45	Burkina Faso	3–0	3–0	Friendly

Note that the friendly of Belgium against Romania on 14 November 2012 is not an FIFA A-match due to an excessive number of substitutions according to the Laws of the Game.

== Honours ==
Standard Liège

- Belgian First Division: 2008–09

Aston Villa

- FA Cup runner-up: 2014–15

Liverpool

- Football League Cup runner-up: 2015–16
- UEFA Europa League runner-up: 2015–16

Individual

- Premier League Player of the Month: April 2015
- MLS All-Star: 2023, 2024
- MLS Best XI: 2024
- MLS Golden Boot: 2024
