= Diego Ochoa (footballer, born 2002) =

Mexican footballer (born 2002)

Personal information
- Full name: Diego Gomez-Ochoa
- Date of birth: 16 February 2002 (age 24)
- Place of birth: La Paz, Baja California Sur, Mexico
- Height: 6 ft 1 in (1.85 m)
- Position: Defender

Team information
- Current team: Notre Dame Fighting Irish
- Number: 18

Youth career
- 2016–2019: LA Galaxy
- 2019–2021: D.C. United

College career
Years	Team	Apps	(Gls)
2021–2024	Boston College Eagles	44	(2)
2025	Notre Dame Fighting Irish	17	(1)

Senior career*
Years	Team	Apps	(Gls)
2020–2021	Loudoun United FC	4	(0)
- * Club domestic league appearances and goals as of October 30, 2021

Diego Gomez-Ochoa (born 16 February 2002) is a Mexican-American college soccer player who plays as a defender. He played college soccer for the Boston College Eagles and Notre Dame Fighting Irish.

== Career statistics ==
=== Club ===
As of October 30, 2021

Club	Season	League			Cup		Other		Total	
Club	Season	Division	Apps	Goals	Apps	Goals	Apps	Goals	Apps	Goals
Loudoun United	2020	USL Championship	0	0	0	0	0	0	0	0
Loudoun United	2021	USL Championship	3	0	0	0	0	0	3	0
Career total			3	0	0	0	0	0	3	0
