= I-95 derbies =

Soccer rivalries between teams along I-95

The I-95 derbies (Note: Citations:), also known as the Acela derbies are the various local soccer derbies between the teams located on the Interstate 95 highway and Northeast Corridor railway of the United States (the Northeast megalopolis). It specifically refers to individual games between the teams located along the corridor, but may also be used to describe the rivalries between the supporters groups. The first I-95 derby in the modern era of American soccer history took place during the 1996 Major League Soccer season, when the New England Revolution and D.C. United played each other on April 27, 1996. The match ended in a 1–1 tie.

Historically the most intense I-95 derbies between American soccer clubs is the Atlantic Cup rivalry between D.C. United and the New York Red Bulls, as well as the Hudson River derby, between the Red Bulls and New York City FC, based upon polls and pundit analysis.

== Teams based along I-95 ==
Division	Team(s)
Major League Soccer	D.C. United, New England Revolution, New York City FC, New York Red Bulls, Philadelphia Union
National Women's Soccer League	NJ/NY Gotham FC, Washington Spirit; Boston Legacy FC
USL Championship	Loudoun United FC, Hartford Athletic, Rhode Island FC
USL League One	Richmond Kickers, New York Cosmos
National Independent Soccer Association	Maryland Bobcats

== Major I-95 derbies ==
Some of the most heated rivalries are between clubs that are geographically close together, or clubs that play in the same league, including:

- Atlantic Cup – between D.C. United and New York Red Bulls – This rivalry is often considered one of the most intense rivalries of original MLS franchises, and one of the most intense rivalries on the East Coast
- East River Derby – between New York Cosmos, which plays in the USL (and previously played in the NASL), and New York City FC, which plays in the MLS. The two teams can only face each other in the US Open Cup.
- Hudson River derby – between New York City FC and New York Red Bulls – This rivalry features Major League Soccer's two clubs based in the New York metropolitan area.
- Shertz–Gemmel Cup or Colonial Cup – between D.C. United and Philadelphia Union.
- El Clamico – between Hartford Athletic and Rhode Island FC – This rivalry features both USL Championship clubs in the New England region.

=== Other I-95 derbies ===
- D.C. United–New England Revolution rivalry: historically, two of the most successful franchises in the Eastern Conference.
- New England Revolution–Philadelphia Union
- New York City FC–Philadelphia Union
- New York Red Bulls–New England Revolution
- New York Red Bulls–Philadelphia Union

== See also ==
- Soccer in the United States
