= Hassan Pinto =

American soccer

Personal information
- Full name: Hassan Rashid Smalls Pinto
- Date of birth: July 29, 1997 (age 29)
- Place of birth: Durham, North Carolina, United States
- Height: 6 ft 1 in (1.85 m)
- Position: Defender

Youth career
- North Carolina Fusion

College career
Years	Team	Apps	(Gls)
2015–2018	Elon Phoenix	48	(0)
2019	Duke Blue Devils	18	(1)

Senior career*
Years	Team	Apps	(Gls)
2019	Wake	6	(0)
2020	Richmond Kickers	1	(0)
2021	Loudoun United	8	(0)
- * Club domestic league appearances and goals as of October 30, 2021

Hassan Rashid Smalls Pinto (born July 29, 1997) is an American professional soccer player who plays as a defender.

== Club career ==
Born in Durham, North Carolina, Pinto began his career with North Carolina Fusion youth academy. He then enrolled at Elon University where he played for the Elon Phoenix from 2016 through 2018. He then transferred to Duke University where he played for the Duke Blue Devils in 2019.

On August 6, 2020, after leaving Duke, Pinto signed his first professional contract when he joined USL League One side Richmond Kickers. He made his professional debut for the club on October 7, 2020, against Orlando City B. Pinto came on as a 72nd-minute substitute as Richmond Kickers won 2–1.

On April 9, 2021, Pinto joined USL Championship side Loudoun United ahead of the 2021 season.

== Career statistics ==
=== Club ===
As of match played October 7, 2020

Appearances and goals by club, season and competition
Club	Season	League			Cup		Other		Total	
Club	Season	Division	Apps	Goals	Apps	Goals	Apps	Goals	Apps	Goals
Wake	2019	USL League Two	6	0	—	—	—	—	6	0
Richmond Kickers	2020	USL League One	1	0	—	—	—	—	1	0
Career total			7	0	0	0	0	0	7	0

== Personal life ==
Pinto's younger siblings, Brianna and Malik, are also soccer players.
