= Owen Walz =

American soccer player

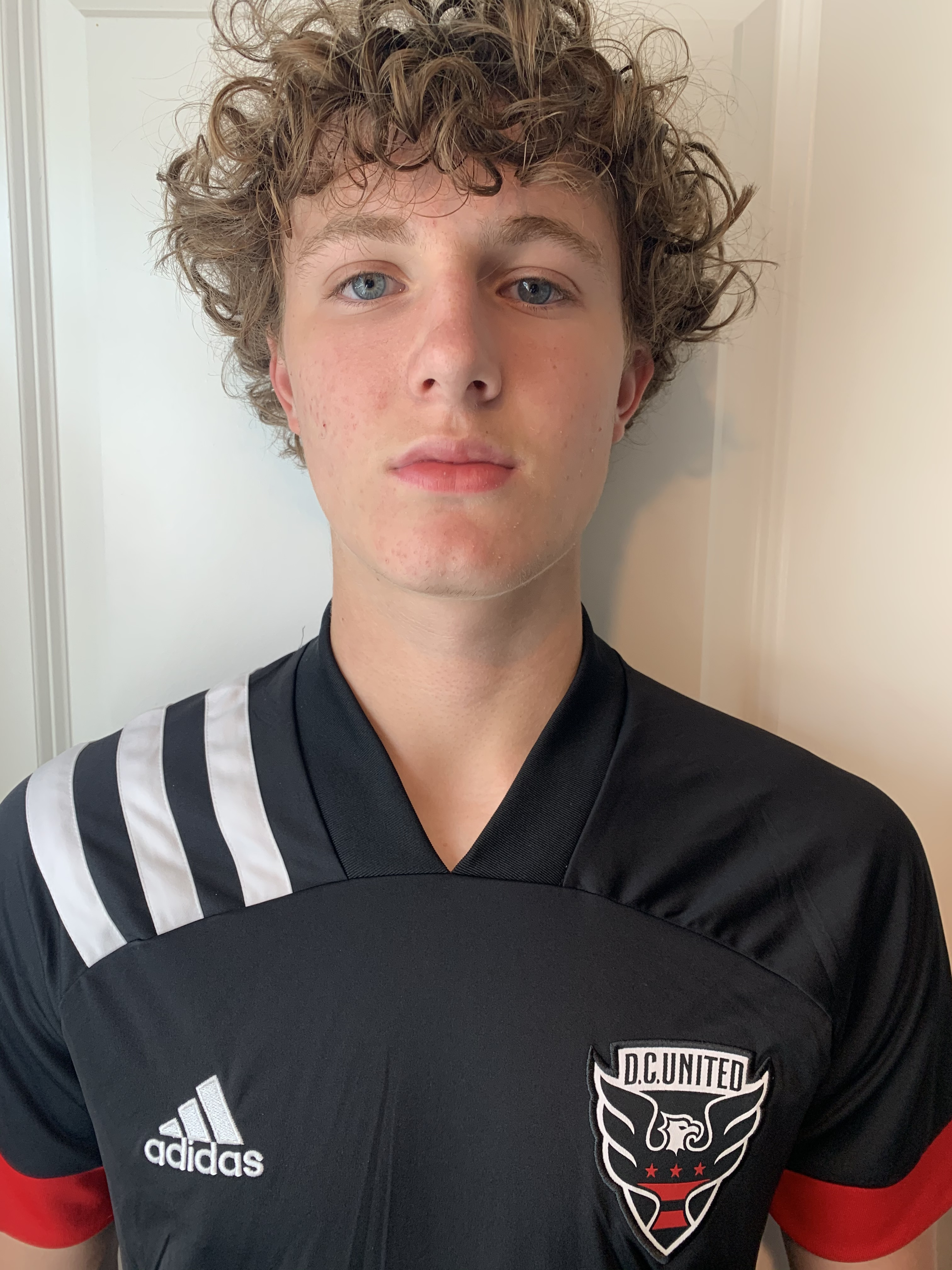

Personal information
- Full name: Owen Walz
- Date of birth: February 27, 2004 (age 22)
- Place of birth: Arlington, Virginia United States
- Height: 6 ft 1 in (1.85 m)
- Position: Defender

Team information
- Current team: Loudoun United
- Number: 26

Youth career
- 2016–2019: Arlington Soccer Association
- 2019–: D.C. United

College career
Years	Team	Apps	(Gls)
2023–2025	San Diego State	57	(2)

Senior career*
Years	Team	Apps	(Gls)
2021	Loudoun United	8	(1)
- * Club domestic league appearances and goals as of 14:42, 27 July 2021 (UTC)

Owen Walz (born February 27, 2004) is an American soccer player who plays as a defender.

== Club career ==
Walz began his career with the Arlington Soccer Association, a local youth soccer organization, before joining the youth setup at Major League Soccer club D.C. United. In February 2021, it was announced that Walz had committed to playing college soccer with the Virginia Cavaliers of the University of Virginia, joining as part of the incoming class of 2022. In March 2021, Walz was announced as part of the pre-season roster for D.C. United affiliate Loudoun United as an academy player.

On May 18, 2021, Walz made his senior debut for Loudoun United in the USL Championship against New York Red Bulls II, starting in the 2–1 defeat.

== International career ==
In April 2021, Walz was called into the United States boy's youth identification camp as part of the 2004–2005 group.

== Career statistics ==
As of match played May 18, 2021

Appearances and goals by club, season and competition
Club	Season	League			National Cup		Continental		Total	
Club	Season	Division	Apps	Goals	Apps	Goals	Apps	Goals	Apps	Goals
Loudoun United	2021	USL Championship	1	0	—		—		1	0
Career total			1	0	0	0	0	0	1	0
