= Jermaine Fordah =

English footballer

Personal information
- Date of birth: 17 April 1993 (age 33)
- Place of birth: London, England
- Height: 6 ft 0 in (1.83 m)
- Position: Goalkeeper

Team information
- Current team: Dothan United

Youth career
- 2006–2009: Luton Town

Senior career*
Years	Team	Apps	(Gls)
2010–2011	Lewes		
2011	Ware		
2013–2014	Banbury United		
2017	AC Connecticut	1	(0)
2018	New York Cosmos B	0	(0)
2019–2020	El Paso Locomotive	2	(0)
2021	Loudoun United	24	(0)
2022	Western Mass Pioneers		
2022	Los Angeles Force		
2024	New Mexico United	0	(0)
2025–	Dothan United	9	(0)
- * Club domestic league appearances and goals as of 08:21, 20 October 2025 (UTC)

Jermaine Fordah (born 17 April 1993) is an English footballer who plays as a goalkeeper for Dothan United.

== Career ==
Fordah was born in London and spent time with Luton Town and in non-league football whilst growing up. In 2014 he moved to America for the first time and joined New York Red Bulls II, before returning to England to spend time training with West Ham United. He then returned to the States to play for AC Connecticut and New York Cosmos B in USL League Two and the National Premier Soccer League respectively. In February 2019, he signed a deal to join newly formed USL Championship side El Paso Locomotive. On 16 May 2019, he made his debut for El Paso, playing the full match in a 3–0 defeat to Forward Madison in the second round of the U.S. Open Cup. On 21 July 2019, Fordah made his USL Championship debut, keeping a clean sheet in a goalless draw with Real Monarchs. On 19 February 2021, Fordah joined Loudoun United FC ahead of the 2021 season. In 2022, he was playing for USL League Two side Western Mass Pioneers. In September 2024, Fordah signed a 25-day emergency contract with USL Championship side New Mexico United. In April 2025, Fordah joined USL League Two side Dothan United.

== Career statistics ==
=== Club ===
As of 18 May 2019.

Appearances and goals by club, season and competition
Club	Season	League			Cup		Other		Total	
Club	Season	Division	Apps	Goals	Apps	Goals	Apps	Goals	Apps	Goals
AC Connecticut	2017	PDL	1	0	0	0	0	0	1	0
El Paso Locomotive	2019	USL Championship	0	0	1 (Note: Appearances in the U.S. Open Cup)	0	0	0	1	0
Career total			1	0	1	0	0	0	2	0
