= Gaoussou Samaké =

Ivorian footballer

Personal information
- Full name: Gaoussou Samaké
- Date of birth: 4 November 1997 (age 29)
- Place of birth: Dabou, Ivory Coast
- Height: 5 ft 7 in (1.70 m)
- Position: Left back

Team information
- Current team: Las Vegas Lights
- Number: 72

Senior career*
Years	Team	Apps	(Gls)
2018–2021	ASEC Mimosas		
2021	→ Loudoun United (loan)	14	(1)
2022–2023	D.C. United	3	(0)
2022–2023	→ Loudoun United (loan)	15	(0)
2024–	Las Vegas Lights	11	(3)

International career
- Ivory Coast U23
- * Club domestic league appearances and goals as of October 28, 2025

Gaoussou Samaké (born 4 November 1997) is an Ivorian professional footballer who plays as a left back for Las Vegas Lights in the USL Championship.

== Career ==
=== ASEC Mimosas ===
Samaké spent two years with the first team of Ivorian MTN Ligue 1 side ASEC Mimosas, making 10 appearances for the club. On 11 February 2021, Samaké signed on loan with USL Championship side Loudoun United for their 2021 season. He made his debut for Loudoun on 2 May 2021, starting in a 2–1 loss to Miami FC.

=== D.C. United ===
On 22 November 2021, Loudoun United's MLS parent club D.C. United signed Samaké on a permanent deal ahead of the 2022 season.

=== Las Vegas Lights ===
On 23 February 2024, Samaké signed with USL Championship side Las Vegas Lights FC.

== Career statistics ==
=== Club ===
As of 23 November 2021

Club	Season	League			Cup		Continental		Other		Total	
Club	Season	Division	Apps	Goals	Apps	Goals	Apps	Goals	Apps	Goals	Apps	Goals
Loudoun United (loan)	2021	USL Championship	14	1	0	0	0	0	0	0	14	1
Career total			14	1	0	0	0	0	0	0	14	1
