= 2022 Loudoun United FC season =

Loudoun United FC
2022 season
- General manager: Lucy Rushton
- Head coach: Ryan Martin
- Stadium: Segra Field
- USL Championship: Conference: 11th Overall: 25th
- USL Cup: Did not qualify
- Top goalscorer: League: Tyler Freeman (6); All: Tyler Freeman (6)
- Highest home attendance: 2,496 (vs Detroit City, October 1, USLC)
- Lowest home attendance: 1,031 (vs Indy Eleven, March 12, USLC)
- Average home league attendance: 1,583
- Biggest win: 3–0 (vs New York Red Bulls II (A), March 20, USLC)
- Biggest defeat: 0–8 (at Tampa Bay Rowdies (A), October 8, USLC)
Home colors	Away colors

The 2022 Loudoun United FC season was Loudoun United FC's fourth season of existence, their fourth in the second-division of American soccer, and their fourth in the USL Championship.

The 2022 marked an improvement in United's overall record, winning twice as many matches as last season. Despite this, the club still finished with a losing record, and failed to qualify for the playoffs for their fourth consecutive season. Notable offseason pickups included Tyler Freeman, who lead Loudoun in goals during the season. Other major pickups included Rio Hope-Gund, Carson Vom Steeg, and Skage Simonsen. During the season, several players on Loudoun were promoted to the first team including Kristian Fletcher, Sami Guediri, and Jackson Hopkins.

== Background ==
The 2021 season was Loudoun United's third season of existence. The club played in the second tier of American soccer, the USL Championship. There, the club finished with the worst record in USL Championship, with 4–3–25, scoring 31 goals and allowing 78, by far the worst goal differential in the league. Midfielder Ted Ku-DiPietro lead the team with seven goals during the course of the season, and also lead the team with three assists during the 2021 campaign. Jovanny Bolívar finished with six goals during the season, while Samson Sergi finished with three goals. Jermaine Fordah finished the season with two clean sheets.

The club failed to qualify for the 2021 USL Championship Playoffs.

== Transfers ==
=== Transfers in ===
Date	Position	No.	Name	From	Fee/notes	Ref.
January 28, 2022	DF	21	(Algeria) Sami Guediri	(United States) Inter Miami CF	Free	
January 28, 2022	FW	18	(United States) Azaad Liadi	(United States) Tormenta	Free	
January 28, 2022	DF	5	(United States) Grant Lillard	(United States) Columbus Crew	Free	
January 28, 2022	GK	1	(United States) Trey Muse	(United States) San Diego Loyal	Free	
February 11, 2022	DF	2	(United States) Rio Hope-Gund	(United States) Orlando City SC	Free	
February 11, 2022	GK	13	(United States) Joe Rice	(United States) New England Revolution II	Free	
February 11, 2022	MF	4	(United States) Carson Vom Steeg	(United States) UC Santa Barbara Gauchos	Free	
March 8, 2022	MF	8	(Norway) Skage Simonsen	(United States) SMU Mustangs	2022 MLS SuperDraft	
March 10, 2022	MF	31	(United States) Arvid Lindquist	(United States) D.C. United Academy	Academy call-up	
March 10, 2022	MF	31	(United States) Mathias Yohannes	(United States) D.C. United Academy	Academy call-up	
March 10, 2022	DF	32	(United States) Jace Clark	(United States) D.C. United Academy	Academy call-up	
March 10, 2022	MF	35	(Egypt) Abdellatif Aboukoura	(United States) D.C. United Academy	Academy call-up	
March 10, 2022	MF	36	(United States) Brandon Meminger	(United States) D.C. United Academy	Academy call-up	
March 10, 2022	MF	37	(United States) Ignacio Alem	(United States) D.C. United Academy	Academy call-up	
March 10, 2022	DF	38	(United States) Owen Walz	(United States) D.C. United Academy	Academy call-up	
March 10, 2022	MF	39	(Honduras) Isaac Espinal	(United States) D.C. United Academy	Academy call-up	
March 10, 2022	FW	40	(United States) Gavin Turner	(United States) D.C. United Academy	Academy call-up	
March 10, 2022	DF	41	(Ghana) Matai Akinmboni	(United States) D.C. United Academy	Academy call-up	
March 10, 2022	FW	42	(United States) Jackson Hopkins	(United States) D.C. United Academy	Academy call-up	
March 10, 2022	GK	43	(United States) Luke Peacock	(United States) D.C. United Academy	Academy call-up	
March 11, 2022	FW	11	(United States) Tyler Freeman	(United States) Sporting Kansas City	Free	
March 11, 2022	GK	50	(United States) Luis Zamudio	(United States) Miami FC	Free	
September 4, 2022	FW	9	(Belgium) Jonathan Benteke	(Germany) Wegberg-Beeck	Free	

=== Transfers out ===
Date	Position	No.	Name	To	Fee/notes	Ref.
November 21, 2021	DF	2	(Ivory Coast) Gaoussou Samaké	(United States) D.C. United	Signed with first team	
December 31, 2021	MF	4	(El Salvador) Jeremy Garay	(United States) D.C. United	Signed with first team	
December 31, 2021	MF	5	(United States) Hassan Pinto	None	Retired	
December 31, 2021	FW	6	(Canada) Massimo Ferrin	(Canada) Vaughan Azzurri	Released	
December 31, 2021	FW	7	(Venezuela) Darluis Paz	None	Released	
December 31, 2021	MF	8	(Afghanistan) Barry Sharifi	(United States) Tormenta	Free	
December 31, 2021	FW	9	(Venezuela) Jovanny Bolívar	(Venezuela) Deportivo La Guaira	End of loan	
December 31, 2021	MF	14	(United States) Tyler Gabarra	(United States) Bay Cities FC	Free	
December 31, 2021	FW	17	(England) Kimarni Smith	(United States) D.C. United	End of loan	
December 31, 2021	DF	23	(Mexico) Diego Gomez-Ochoa	(United States) Boston College Eagles	Signed National Letter of Intent	
December 31, 2021	FW	24	(United States) Sammy Sergi	None	Released	
December 31, 2021	DF	27	(United States) Matt Di Rosa	None	Retired	
December 31, 2021	GK	30	(England) Noah Abrams	(United States) Miami FC	Released	
December 31, 2021	DF	33	(United States) Jacob Greene	(United States) D.C. United	End of loan	
December 31, 2021	MF	34	(Egypt) Abdellatif Aboukoura	(United States) D.C. United Academy	Returned to Academy	
December 31, 2021	DF	35	(United States) Troy Matingou	(United States) D.C. United Academy	Returned to Academy	
December 31, 2021	DF	55	(Trinidad and Tobago) Michael DeShields	(United States) New England Revolution II	End of loan	
January 1, 2022	GK	0	(England) Jermaine Fordah	(United States) Western Mass Pioneers	Released	
January 7, 2022	DF	29	(United States) Timmy Mehl	(United States) Tampa Bay Rowdies	Free	
January 13, 2022	MF	21	(United States) Ted Ku-DiPietro	(United States) D.C. United	Signed with first team	
January 19, 2022	DF	22	(United States) Robby Dambrot	(United States) Pittsburgh Riverhounds	Free	
February 10, 2022	DF	18	(Ghana) Wahab Ackwei	(United States) RGV Toros	Free	
February 10, 2022	FW	12	(Venezuela) Giovanni Montesdeoca	(United States) Union Omaha	Free	
March 18, 2022	GK	1	(United States) Keegan Meyer	(United States) Charlotte Independence	Released	
April 13, 2022	FW	42	(United States) Jackson Hopkins	(United States) D.C. United	Signed with first team	
July 1, 2022	DF	21	(Algeria) Sami Guediri	(United States) D.C. United	Signed with first team	
August 1, 2022	GK	31	(United States) Jonathan Mennell	(United States) Xavier Musketeers	Signed National Letter of Intent	
August 30, 2022	FW	45	(United States) Kristian Fletcher	(United States) D.C. United	Signed with first team	

=== Loans in ===
No.	Pos.	Player	Loaned from	Start	End	Source
19	MF	(Ivory Coast) Nanan Houssou	(Ivory Coast) Abengourou	February 19, 2021	December 31, 2022	
14	FW	(El Salvador) Jeremy Garay	(United States) D.C. United	March 1, 2022	October 31, 2022	
17	FW	(England) Kimarni Smith	(United States) D.C. United	March 1, 2022	October 31, 2022	
20	DF	(United States) Hayden Sargis	(United States) D.C. United	March 1, 2022	October 31, 2022	
33	MF	(United States) Jacob Greene	(United States) D.C. United	March 1, 2022	October 31, 2022	
35	MF	(United States) Ted Ku-DiPietro	(United States) D.C. United	March 1, 2022	October 31, 2022	
12	MF	(Ivory Coast) Zoumana Diarra	(Ivory Coast) ASEC Mimosas	March 10, 2022	November 30, 2022	
7	MF	(Ivory Coast) Abdoul Zanne	(Ivory Coast) ASEC Mimosas	March 10, 2022	November 30, 2022	
6	DF	(Ivory Coast) Gaoussou Samaké	(United States) D.C. United	April 6, 2022	April 11, 2022	
29	MF	(Liberia) Moses Nyeman	(United States) D.C. United	April 6, 2022	April 11, 2022	
28	GK	(United States) Jon Kempin	(United States) D.C. United	April 6, 2022	April 11, 2022	
25	MF	(Morocco) Hassan Aqboub	(Morocco) Mohammed VI	September 1, 2022	December 31, 2022	

=== Loans out ===
No.	Pos.	Player	Loaned to	Start	End	Source
18	MF	(United States) Azaad Liadi	(United States) D.C. United	February 26, 2022	March 2, 2022	
1	GK	(United States) Trey Muse	(United States) Memphis 901	March 11, 2022	October 31, 2022	
21	DF	(Algeria) Sami Guediri	(United States) D.C. United	May 18, 2022	June 30, 2022	

== Roster ==
=== Team management ===
Executive
General manager	(United States) Stewart Mairs
Marketing and digital manager	(United States) Emma Carlin
Technical staff
Head coach	(United States) Ryan Martin
Assistant coach	(The Gambia) Mattar M'Boge
Performance coach	(United States) Victor Lonchuk

=== Roster ===
Note: Flags indicate national team as defined under FIFA eligibility rules; some limited exceptions apply. Players may hold more than one non-FIFA nationality.

No.	Pos.	Nation	Player
0	GK	USA	Dane Jacomen
2	DF	USA	Rio Hope-Gund
3	DF	USA	Jacob Greene (on loan from D.C. United)
4	DF	USA	Carson Vom Steeg
5	DF	USA	Grant Lillard
6	DF	CIV	Gaoussou Samaké (on loan from D.C. United)
7	MF	CIV	Abdoul Zanne (on loan from ASEC Mimosas)
8	MF	NOR	Skage Simonsen
9	FW	BEL	Jonathan Benteke
10	MF	USA	Mike Gamble
11	FW	USA	Tyler Freeman
12	MF	CIV	Zoumana Diarra
13	GK	USA	Joe Rice
14	MF	ESA	Jeremy Garay (on loan from D.C. United)
15	MF	USA	Nicky Downs
17	FW	ENG	Kimarni Smith (on loan from D.C. United)
18	FW	NGR	Azaad Liadi

No.	Pos.	Nation	Player
19	DF	CIV	Nanan Houssou (on loan from ASI Abengourou)
20	DF	USA	Hayden Sargis (on loan from D.C. United)
24	MF	USA	Jalen Robinson
25	MF	MAR	Hassan Aqboub (on loan from Mohammed VI)
30	DF	USA	Arvid Lindquist
31	MF	USA	Mathias Yohannes
32	DF	USA	Jace Clark
35	FW	EGY	Abdellatif Aboukoura
36	MF	USA	Brandon Meminger
37	MF	USA	Ignacio Alem
38	DF	USA	Owen Walz
39	MF	HON	Isaac Espinal
40	FW	USA	Gavin Turner
43	GK	USA	Luke Peacock
46	FW	USA	Alexander Dexter
50	GK	MEX	Luis Zamudio
51	DF	ESA	Allexon Saravia

=== On loan ===
Note: Flags indicate national team as defined under FIFA eligibility rules; some limited exceptions apply. Players may hold more than one non-FIFA nationality.

No.	Pos.	Nation	Player
1	GK	USA	Trey Muse (on loan to Memphis 901)

== Non-competitive ==
=== Preseason exhibitions ===
February 12	Loudoun United	1–2	Richmond Kickers	Leesburg, VA
14:00 EDT	Liadi 66'	Report	Terzaghi 34'; Bentley 61'	Stadium: Segra Field; Attendance: 0

February 16	Pittsburgh Riverhounds	3–0	Loudoun United	Pittsburgh, PA
14:00 EDT	Borso 24'; Dixon 74' (pen.); Eyang 90'	Report		Stadium: Highmark Stadium; Attendance: 0

February 26	Richmond Kickers	0–0	Loudoun United	Glen Allen, VA
14:00 EST				Stadium: Striker Soccer Complex; Attendance: 0

March 12	Loudoun United	v	Richmond Kickers	Leesburg, VA
14:00 EDT				Stadium: Segra Field

=== Midseason exhibitions ===
To be announced

== Competitive ==
=== USL Championship ===
==== Standings ====
Pos	Team	Pld	W	L	T	GF	GA	GD	Pts
9	Indy Eleven	34	12	17	5	41	55	−14	41
10	Hartford Athletic	34	10	18	6	47	57	−10	36
11	Loudoun United FC	34	8	22	4	36	74	−38	28
12	Charleston Battery	34	6	21	7	41	77	−36	25
13	Atlanta United 2	34	6	23	5	39	85	−46	23

Source: USL Championship Standings
Rules for classification: 1) head-to-head points; 2) head-to-head goal differential; 3) points-per game within conference; 4) total wins; 5) total goal differential; 6) total goals scored; 7) points earned against top four Conference finishers; 8) disciplinary points; 9) coin toss or drawing of lots

==== Results summary ====
Overall								Home						Away					
Pld	W	D	L	GF	GA	GD	Pts	W	D	L	GF	GA	GD	W	D	L	GF	GA	GD
30	8	3	19	35	60	−25	27	6	2	8	22	28	−6	2	1	11	13	32	−19

Last updated: September 23, 2022.
Source: USL Championship

==== Results by matchday ====
Game Week	1	2	3	4	5	6	7	8	9	10	11	12	13	14	15	16	17
Stadium	H	A	A	A	H	A	H	H	A	A	H	H	H	A	H	A	H
Result	W	W	D	L	L	L	L	L	L	L	L	D	W	L	W	L	D
Position (conference)	3	2	3	5	7	9	10	10	11	12	12	12	11	11	10	11	11
Position (overall)	5	2	4	8	14	16	20	21	23	23	23	22	22	23	21	22	22

Updated to match(es) played on February 2022. Source: USL Championship
A = Away; H = Home; W = Win; D = Draw; L = Loss; P = Postponed
Notes: Positions show the situation at the end of the corresponding Game Weeks (GW); not the position at the conclusion of matches or game days

==== Match results ====
March 12 1	Loudoun United	1–0	Indy Eleven	Leesburg, VA
17:45 EST	Smith 43' (yellow card) 90+5'; Greene (yellow card) 62'; Hope-Gund (yellow card) 70'; Lillard (yellow card) 84'	Report	Hackshaw (yellow card) 20'; Briggs (yellow card) 87'; McQueen (red card) 90'	Stadium: Segra Field; Attendance: 1,031; Referee: John Matto

March 19 2	New York Red Bulls II	0–3	Loudoun United	Montclair, NJ
13:00 EDT	Murphy (yellow card) 17'; Cragwell (red card) 26'; Ofori (yellow card) 79'	Report	Greene (yellow card) 13' (goal) 76'; Freeman 52', 60'; Hope-Gund (yellow card) 54'	Stadium: Pittser Field; Attendance: 460; Referee: Jervis Atagana

March 26 3	Miami FC	0–0	Loudoun United	Miami, FL
19:00 EDT	Bah (yellow card) 8'; Parkes (yellow card) 61'; Antonelli (yellow card) 66'	Report	Guediri (yellow card) 15' (yellow-red card) 83'; Downs (yellow card) 42'	Stadium: Riccardo Silva Stadium; Attendance: 1,174; Referee: Jalen Gray

April 2 4	Pittsburgh Riverhounds	2–0	Loudoun United	Pittsburgh, PA
19:00 EDT	Kelly 65', 73' (yellow card) 88'; Forbes (yellow card) 77'	Report	Sargis (yellow card) 90+4'	Stadium: Highmark Stadium; Attendance: 2,456; Referee: Austin Saini

April 10 5	Loudoun United	0–2	Louisville City	Leesburg, VA
15:45 EDT	Ku-DiPietro (yellow card) 56'; Diarra (yellow card) 68'	Report	Harris 4'; Wynder (yellow card) 28'; Ownby 53'; Gonzalez (yellow card) 65'; Totsch (yellow card) 75'; Gibson (yellow card) 77'; Mushagalusa (yellow card) 89'	Stadium: Segra Field; Attendance: 1,444; Referee: Luis Arroyo

April 16 6	Oakland Roots	4–1	Loudoun United	Oakland, CA
15:45 EDT	Klimenta 26'; Karlsson 53' (pen.); Azócar 67'; Jáuregui (yellow card) 70'; Rito 76'; Formella (yellow card) 85'	Report	Liadi (yellow card) 34'; Downs (yellow card) 35'; Vom Steeg (yellow card) 74'; Aboukoura 81'; Zanne (yellow card) 81'	Stadium: Laney Stadium; Attendance: 3,807; Referee: Lorenzo Hernandez

April 24 7	Loudoun United	1–2	Birmingham Legion	Leesburg, VA
15:45 EDT	Greene (yellow card) 27'; Sargis (red card) 71'; Zanne 80'	Report	Asiedu (yellow card) 33'; Dean (yellow card) 50'; Martínez 62'; Diop 79'; Bruno Lapa (yellow card) 85'	Stadium: Segra Field; Attendance: 1,523; Referee: Elvis Osmanovic

April 30 8	Loudoun United	1–3	El Paso Locomotive	Leesburg, VA
17:45 EDT	Guediri 28' (pen.); Houssou (yellow card) 39'; Hope-Gund (yellow card) 44'; Downs (yellow card) 49'; Rice (yellow card) 67'; Liadi (red card) 87'	Report	Bahner (yellow card) 27'; Brockbank (yellow card) 40'; Herrera (yellow card) 65'; Solignac 68' (pen.), 90+5'; Luna 81', (yellow card) 83'; Borelli (yellow card) 90+1'	Stadium: Segra Field; Attendance: 1,282; Referee: Matthew Franz

May 7 9	Hartford Athletic	1–0	Loudoun United	Hartford, CT
19:00 EDT	Brewitt (yellow card) 24'; Johnson 41'; Hertzog (yellow card) 69'; Prpa (yellow card) 73'	Report	Grant Lillard (yellow card) 68'	Stadium: Trinity Health Stadium; Attendance: 4,631; Referee: Thomas Snyder

May 14 10	Detroit City	4–2	Loudoun United	Detroit, MI
19:30 EDT	Lillard 35' (o.g.); Botello 39'; Bryant 45+2'; Rodriguez 53'; Wynne (yellow card) 76'; Amoo-Mensah (yellow card) 88'	Report	Hope-Gund (yellow card) 58'; Simonsen 68'; Lillard 90+2'	Stadium: Keyworth Stadium; Attendance: 5,256; Referee: Austin Saini

May 22 11	Loudoun United	0–3	Memphis 901	Leesburg, VA
15:45 EDT	Lillard (yellow card) 27'; Yow (yellow card) 55'; Sargis (yellow card) 64'; Houssou (yellow card) 75'; Ku-DiPietro (yellow card) 90+2'	Report	Kissiedou 5', (yellow card) 66'; Kelly 29'; Goodrum 55'; Paul (yellow card) 55'; Allan (yellow card) 67'	Stadium: Segra Field; Attendance: 1,106; Referee: Jeremy Scheer

May 28 12	Loudoun United	1–1	Charleston Battery	Leesburg, VA
18:45 EDT	Lillard (yellow card) 50'; Guediri (yellow card) 64'; Dexter (yellow card) 72', (goal) 76'; Hope-Gund (red card) 85'	Report	Williams (penalty missed) 68'; Holcomb (yellow card) 85'; Piggott (yellow card) 85'; Kuzminsky 90+5'	Stadium: Segra Field; Attendance: 1,253; Referee: John Griggs

June 8 13	Loudoun United	1–0	New York Red Bulls II	Leesburg, VA
19:15 EDT	Aboukoura 38'; Liadi (yellow card) 54'; Clark (yellow card) 60'	Report	Ofori (yellow card) 46'; Williams (yellow card) 50'; Tyrkus (yellow card) 75'; Rafanello (yellow card) 77'	Stadium: Segra Field; Attendance: 1,037; Referee: Jalen Gray

June 11 14	Atlanta United 2	2–0	Loudoun United	Kennesaw, GA
19:30 EDT	Morales (yellow card) 20'; Raimar 32' (pen.), (yellow card) 60', (goal) 90+4'	Report	Smith (yellow card) 80'	Stadium: Fifth Third Bank Stadium; Attendance: 339; Referee: Adorae Monroy

June 18 15	Loudoun United	4–3	Phoenix Rising	Leesburg, VA
19:15 EDT	Zanne (yellow card) 18'; Aboukoura 32', 58'; Guediri 59'; Freeman 83'	Report	Quinn 9', 90+3'; Landry 90' (o.g.)	Stadium: Segra Field; Attendance: 1,588; Referee: Joshua Encarnación

June 26 16	Orange County SC	3–1	Loudoun United	Irvine, CA
20:00 EDT	Iloski 4', 90+4'; Pedersen (yellow card) 27' (yellow-red card) 69'; Orozco (yellow card) 52'; Torres 58'	Report	Lehland 2'; Landry (yellow card) 19'; Guediri (yellow card) 32', (penalty missed) 52'	Stadium: Championship Soccer Stadium; Attendance: 4,119; Referee: Joseph Salinas

July 3 17	Loudoun United	2–2	FC Tulsa	Leesburg, VA
19:15 EDT	Robinson 7'; Greene (yellow card) 53'; Freeman 55'; Zamudio (yellow card) 88'; Gamble (yellow card) 90'	Report	Obinwa (yellow card) 17'; Torres (yellow card) 29'; Williams (penalty missed) 43'; Suarez 85'; Bird (yellow card) 90' da Costa 90+7'	Stadium: Segra Field; Attendance: 1,405; Referee: Wes Caouette

July 16 18	Loudoun United	1–4	Tampa Bay Rowdies	Leesburg, VA
19:15 EDT	Freeman 80'	Report	LaCava 64'; Dos Santos 68'; Fernandes 73'; Dalgaard 82'	Stadium: Segra Field; Attendance: 1,613; Referee: Esad Omanovic

July 23 19	Loudoun United	1–2	Miami FC	Leesburg, VA
19:15 EDT	Zanne 13'; Diarra (yellow card) 60'; Freeman (yellow card) 70'; Downs (yellow card) 90'	Report	Valot 34'; Murphy (yellow card) 40'; Akinyode (yellow card) 59'; Craig 90+2'; Ballard (yellow card) 90+4'	Stadium: Segra Field; Attendance: 1,289; Referee: Austin Saini

July 27 20	Birmingham Legion	6–1	Loudoun United	Birmingham, AL
20:00 EDT	Lapa 22', 43', 49' (pen.); Kasim 31' (pen.); Corcoran (yellow card) 77'; Bunbury 88' (pen.); Dupont 90+3'	Report	Greene (yellow card) 47'; Landry (red card) 48'; Fletcher 54'	Stadium: Protective Stadium; Attendance: Not reported Referee: Sergii Demianchuk

July 30 21	Loudoun United	0–1	Monterey Bay FC	Leesburg, VA
19:15 EDT	Diarra (yellow card) 29'; Zanne (yellow card) 40'; Greene (yellow card) 90'	Report	Gorskie (yellow card) 45+1'; Conneh 90+3', (yellow card) 90+4'	Stadium: Segra Field; Attendance: 1,737; Referee: Matt Thompson

August 6 22	Loudoun United	2–0	LA Galaxy II	Leesburg, VA
19:15 EDT	Greene (yellow card) 32'; Zanne (yellow card) 59'; Fletcher 63', 85'; Zamudio (yellow card) 80'	Report		Stadium: Segra Field; Attendance: 2,076; Referee: Alex Beehler

August 10 23	San Antonio FC	2–1	Loudoun United	San Antonio, TX
21:00 EDT	Adeniran 10', 51'; Taintor (yellow card) 45+3'	Report	Zanne (yellow card) 18'; Nyeman 45'; Diarra (yellow card) 75'	Stadium: Toyota Field; Attendance: 4,756; Referee: Melvin Rivas

August 20 24	Loudoun United	3–1	Atlanta United 2	Leesburg, VA
19:15 EDT	Freeman 8' (pen.); Orji 68' (o.g.); Zamudio (yellow card) 90'; Garay 90+3'	Report	Conway 22'; Orji (yellow card) 52'; Raimar (yellow card) 75'	Stadium: Segra Field; Attendance: 1,932; Referee: Alex Billeter

August 27 25	FC Tulsa	2–1	Loudoun United	Tulsa, OK
19:15 EDT	Ramírez 38'; Suárez 79'	Report	Fletcher 37'	Stadium: ONEOK Field; Attendance: 4,359; Referee: Melvin Rivas

August 31 26	Memphis 901	0–1	Loudoun United	Memphis, TN
20:00 EDT	Smith (yellow card) 50' (yellow-red card) 90'; Turci (yellow card) 90+6'	Report	Greene 56'; Downs (yellow card) 65'; Zamudio (yellow card) 84'	Stadium: AutoZone Park; Attendance: 3,001; Referee: Deshun Beard

September 4 27	Loudoun United	1–2	Pittsburgh Riverhounds	Leesburg, VA
19:15 EDT	Freeman (yellow card) 69'; Benteke 89' (pen.)	Report	Cicerone 26'; Wiedt (yellow card) 41'; Waite (yellow card) 55'; Kizza 74'; Argudo (yellow card) 90'; Williams (yellow card) 90+3'	Stadium: Segra Field; Attendance: 2,020; Referee: Abdou Ndiaye

September 10 28	Sacramento Republic	4–0	Loudoun United	Sacramento, CA
22:00 EDT	Ross (yellow card) 35'; Brown 48'; Gurr 56' (yellow card) 90+5'; Casey 65'; Archimède 83'	Report	Zanne (yellow card) 30'; Freeman (yellow card) 63'; Downs (yellow card) 64'; Robinson (yellow card) 80'; Aboukoura (yellow card) 90+5'	Stadium: Heart Health Park; Attendance: 9,874; Referee: Alyssa Nichols

September 17 29	Louisville City	4–2	Loudoun United	Louisville, KY
19:30 EDT	Mushagalusa 4'; Harris 20'; Totsch 25' (pen.); Ownby 64'; Serrano (red card) 90+2'	Report	Freeman (yellow card) 19'; Ku-DiPietro 44' (yellow card) 90+3'; Diarra 62' (yellow card) 90+3'; Liadi (yellow card) 88'	Stadium: Lynn Family Stadium; Attendance: 11,345; Referee: Nabil Bensalah

September 21 30	Loudoun United	3–0	Hartford Athletic	Leesburg, VA
18:45 EDT	Simonsen (yellow card) 31'; Ku-DiPietro 50'; Akinmboni (yellow card) 51'; Freeman 71', 74'; Smith (yellow card) 90+6'	Report	Saydee (yellow card) 43'; Yacoubou (yellow card) 45+2'; Brewitt (yellow card) 63'	Stadium: Segra Field; Attendance: 2,073; Referee: Danielle Chesky

September 25 31	Indy Eleven	1–0	Loudoun United	Indianapolis, IN
17:00 EDT	Rebellón (yellow card) 41'; Ayoze García (penalty scored) 68'; Arteaga (yellow card) 81'; Aguilera (yellow card) 87'	Report	Landry (yellow card) 37'; Smith (yellow card) 44'; Robinson (yellow card) 90+6'; Greene (yellow card) 90+7'	Stadium: Michael A. Carroll Stadium; Attendance: 8,575; Referee: Austin Saini

October 1 32	Loudoun United	0–4	Detroit City	Leesburg, VA
18:15 EDT	Vom Steeg (yellow card) 21'; Zanne (yellow card) 83'; Liadi (yellow card) 88'	Report	Matthews 8'; Williams (yellow card) 26'; Rodriguez 41', 66', 70'; Lewis (yellow card) 73'	Stadium: Segra Field; Attendance: 2,496; Referee: Alyssa Nichols

October 8 33	Tampa Bay Rowdies	8–0	Loudoun United	St. Petersburg, FL
19:30 EDT	Guenzatti 19' (pen.), 61'; Castellanos 23'; LaCava 45+1'; Dalgaard 64'; Mkosana 83'; Harris 87', 90+3'	Report	Houssou (yellow card) 9'; Downs (yellow card) 49'; Koffi (yellow card) 73'; Freeman (yellow card) 90+1'; Zamudio (yellow card) 90+4'	Stadium: Al Lang Stadium; Attendance: 5,147; Referee: Eric Tattersall

October 15 34	Charleston Battery	1–1	Loudoun United	Charleston, SC
19:00 EDT	Paterson (yellow card) 13'; Oduro (yellow card) 37'; Kilwien (yellow card) 76'; Pérez 86'	Report	Smith 26'; Lehland (yellow card) 31'; Zanne (yellow card) 57'; Landry (yellow card) 71'	Stadium: Patriots Point Stadium; Attendance: 4,325; Referee: Matthew Franz

== Statistics ==
=== Appearances and goals ===
Numbers after plus-sign(+) denote appearances as a substitute.

No.	Pos	Nat	Player	Total		USLC		USL Cup	
No.	Pos	Nat	Player	Apps	Goals	Apps	Goals	Apps	Goals
0	DF	(United States) USA	Dane Jacomen	0	0	0	0	0	0
2	DF	(United States) USA	Rio Hope-Gund	16	0	15+1	0	0	0
3	DF	(United States) USA	Jacob Greene	26	2	26+0	2	0	0
4	MF	(United States) USA	Carson Vom Steeg	16	0	15+1	0	0	0
5	DF	(United States) USA	Grant Lillard	16	1	16+0	1	0	0
6	DF	(Ivory Coast) CIV	Gaoussou Samaké	14	0	11+3	0	0	0
7	MF	(Ivory Coast) CIV	Abdoul Zanne	19	2	10+9	2	0	0
8	MF	(Norway) NOR	Skage Simonsen	19	2	19+0	2	0	0
9	FW	(Belgium) BEL	Jonathan Benteke	1	1	0+1	1	0	0
10	MF	(United States) USA	Mike Gamble	15	0	12+3	0	0	0
11	FW	(United States) USA	Tyler Freeman	18	6	7+11	6	0	0
12	MF	(Ivory Coast) CIV	Zoumana Diarra	14	0	7+7	0	0	0
13	GK	(United States) USA	Joe Rice	5	0	5+0	0	0	0
14	MF	(El Salvador) ESA	Jeremy Garay	17	1	14+3	1	0	0
15	MF	(United States) USA	Nicky Downs	27	0	27+0	0	0	0
17	FW	(England) ENG	Kimarni Smith	8	1	8+0	1	0	0
18	FW	(Nigeria) NGR	Azaad Liadi	17	0	11+6	0	0	0
19	DF	(Ivory Coast) CIV	Nanan Houssou	21	0	10+11	0	0	0
20	DF	(United States) USA	Hayden Sargis	17	0	14+3	0	0	0
24	MF	(United States) USA	Jalen Robinson	16	1	14+2	1	0	0
25	MF	(Morocco) MAR	Hassan Aqboub	0	0	0	0	0	0
30	DF	(United States) USA	Arvid Lindquist	0	0	0	0	0	0
31	MF	(United States) USA	Mathias Yohannes	2	0	0+2	0	0	0
32	DF	(United States) USA	Jace Clark	4	0	0+4	0	0	0
35	FW	(Egypt) EGY	Abdellatif Aboukoura	10	4	5+5	4	0	0
36	MF	(United States) USA	Brandon Meminger	0	0	0	0	0	0
37	MF	(United States) USA	Ignacio Alem	5	0	0+5	0	0	0
38	DF	(United States) USA	Owen Walz	0	0	0	0	0	0
39	MF	(Honduras) HON	Isaac Espinal	7	0	0+7	0	0	0
40	FW	(United States) USA	Gavin Turner	2	0	0+2	0	0	0
43	GK	(United States) USA	Luke Peacock	0	0	0	0	0	0
46	FW	(United States) USA	Alexander Dexter	3	1	1+2	1	0	0
50	GK	(Mexico) MEX	Luis Zamudio	21	0	21+0	0	0	0
51	DF	(El Salvador) ESA	Allexon Saravia	0	0	0+0	0	0	0
Players transferred out during the season
16	FW	(United States) USA	Griffin Yow	2	0	2+0	0	0	0
21	DF	(Algeria) ALG	Sami Guediri	13	2	13+0	2	0	0
22	MF	(United States) USA	Ted Ku-DiPietro	6	0	6+0	0	0	0
27	MF	(Liberia) LBR	Moses Nyeman	2	1	2+0	1	0	0
28	GK	(United States) USA	Jon Kempin	1	0	1+0	0	0	0
41	DF	(Ghana) GHA	Matai Akinmboni	4	0	0+4	0	0	0
42	FW	(United States) USA	Jackson Hopkins	5	0	4+1	0	0	0
45	DF	(United States) USA	Kristian Fletcher	13	4	6+7	4	0	0
Total				27	30	27	30	0	0

- Last updated: September 6, 2022
- Source: Team Stats

=== Top scorers ===
Rank	Position	No.	Name	USLC	USL Cup	Total
1	FW	11	(United States) Tyler Freeman	6	0	6
2	FW	35	(Egypt) Abdellatif Aboukoura	4	0	4
2	FW	45	(United States) Kristian Fletcher	4	0	4
4	DF	3	(United States) Jacob Greene	2	0	2
4	MF	7	(Ivory Coast) Abdoul Zanne	2	0	2
4	MF	8	(Norway) Skage Simonsen	2	0	2
4	DF	21	(Algeria) Sami Guediri	2	0	2
8	DF	5	(United States) Grant Lillard	1	0	1
8	FW	9	(Belgium) Jonathan Benteke	1	0	1
8	MF	14	(El Salvador) Jeremy Garay	1	0	1
8	FW	17	(England) Kimarni Smith	1	0	1
8	MF	24	(United States) Jalen Robinson	1	0	1
8	FW	46	(United States) Alexander Dexter	1	0	1
8	MF	27	(Liberia) Moses Nyeman	1	0	1
Total				29	0	29

- Last updated: September 6, 2022
- Source: Team Stats

=== Top assists ===
Rank	Position	No.	Name	USLC	USL Cup	Total
1	MF	8	(Norway) Skage Simonsen	4	0	4
2	MF	10	(United States) Mike Gamble	3	0	3
3	MF	7	(Ivory Coast) Abdoul Zanne	2	0	2
3	MF	12	(Ivory Coast) Zoumana Diarra	2	0	2
3	MF	15	(United States) Nicky Downs	2	0	2
3	MF	20	(United States) Ted Ku-DiPietro	2	0	2
6	DF	3	(United States) Jacob Greene	1	0	1
6	DF	5	(El Salvador) Grant Lillard	1	0	1
6	FW	11	(United States) Tyler Freeman	1	0	1
6	MF	14	(El Salvador) Jeremy Garay	1	0	1
6	MF	19	(Ivory Coast) Nanan Houssou	1	0	1
6	FW	35	(Egypt) Abdellatif Aboukoura	1	0	1
Total				21	0	21

- Last updated: September 6, 2022
- Source: Team Stats

=== Disciplinary record ===
No.	Pos.	Player	USLC			USL Cup			Total		
No.	Pos.	Player	Booked	(yellow card) (yellow-red card)	Sent off (straight red)	Booked	(yellow card) (yellow-red card)	Sent off (straight red)	Booked	(yellow card) (yellow-red card)	Sent off (straight red)
2	DF	(United States) Rio Hope-Gund	4	0	1	0	0	0	4	0	1
3	DF	(United States) Jacob Greene	7	0	0	0	0	0	7	0	0
4	MF	(United States) Carson Vom Steeg	1	0	0	0	0	0	1	0	0
5	DF	(United States) Grant Lillard	4	0	0	0	0	0	4	0	0
7	MF	(Ivory Coast) Abdoul Zanne	5	0	0	0	0	0	5	0	0
10	MF	(United States) Mike Gamble	1	0	0	0	0	0	1	0	0
11	FW	(United States) Tyler Freeman	2	0	0	0	0	0	2	0	0
12	MF	(Ivory Coast) Zoumana Diarra	4	0	0	0	0	0	4	0	0
12	GK	(United States) Joe Rice	1	0	0	0	0	0	1	0	0
15	MF	(United States) Nicky Downs	5	0	0	0	0	0	5	0	0
17	FW	(England) Kimarni Smith	2	0	0	0	0	0	2	0	0
18	FW	(United States) Azaad Liadi	2	0	1	0	0	0	2	0	1
19	DF	(Ivory Coast) Nanan Houssou	3	0	1	0	0	0	3	0	1
20	DF	(United States) Hayden Sargis	2	0	1	0	0	0	2	0	1
21	DF	(Algeria) Sami Guediri	1	1	0	0	0	0	1	1	0
22	MF	(United States) Ted Ku-DiPietro	2	0	0	0	0	0	2	0	0
32	DF	(United States) Jace Clark	2	0	0	0	0	0	2	0	0
33	MF	(United States) Jacob Greene	1	0	0	0	0	0	1	0	0
37	MF	(United States) Ignacio Alem	1	0	0	0	0	0	1	0	0
50	GK	(Mexico) Luis Zamudio	5	0	0	0	0	0	5	0	0
Total			55	1	4	0	0	0	55	1	4

- Last updated: September 5, 2022
- Source: Team Stats

=== Clean sheets ===
No.	Name	USLC	USL Cup	Total	Games
50	(Mexico) Luis Zamudio	6	0	6	21
Total		6	0	6	21

- Last updated: September 5, 2022
- Source: Team Stats

== See also ==
- 2022 D.C. United season
