= 2023 Loudoun United FC season =

Loudoun United FC
2023 season
- Head coach: Ryan Martin
- Stadium: Segra Field
- USL Championship: Conference: TBD; Overall: TBD
- USL Cup: To be determined
- U.S. Open Cup: Round of 32
| Home colors | Away colors |

The 2023 season was Loudoun United FC's fifth season of existence, their fifth in the second-division of American soccer, and their fifth in the USL Championship.

The club had originally planned to begin the season playing in MLS Next Pro, the reserve league for Major League Soccer, however due to a legal agreement for leasing Segra Field, United is required to play in the second division, requiring the club to remain in USL Championship.

On February 2, 2023, Loudoun United FC was sold to Attain Sports and Entertainment, which owns minor league baseball teams Bowie Baysox and Frederick Keys. D.C. United will continue to own a minority stake in Loudoun United. Furthermore, the change of ownership also means that Loudoun United will become eligible to participate in the 2023 U.S. Open Cup.

== Background ==
Only four players from the previous year's squad (not including those signed to the first team in DC or members of the D.C. United Academy) remained with the team in 2023: Dane Jacomen, Isaac Espinal, Landry Nanan Houssou, and Abdoul Zanne (whose loan from ASEC Mimosas was extended through 2023). All other players who signed with Loudoun in 2022 were recalled by their loaner teams, or were out of contract and signed elsewhere. To make up for the roster shortfall, the team signed a whopping 16 players to different deals to replace the ones who left. From players with experience on other USL teams or reserve sides for MLS teams, to former D.C. United draft picks, to young international stars who showed promise.

With new ownership in place, the team could focus on building a cohesive unit and winning games as opposed to prioritizing the development of players for the first team in D.C. However, D.C. United still held a minority stake in Loudoun, and used the squad to give some of its academy players and reserve squad members some playing time: Jeremy Garay and Gaoussou Samake, who had spent most of their previous years playing with Loudoun even as they were signed to DC, were sent back to Loudoun on season-long loans. In addition, multiple Academy players trained with Loudoun and a handful (including Ethan Pendleton and Xavier O'Neil) were later added to the full roster.

Having new ownership separate from D.C. United allowed Loudoun to participate in the US Open Cup for the first time in their short history. Loudoun entered the second round as the home team against North Carolina FC, and emerged victorious with a 2–1 win in Extra Time. The team managed to draw a home game in the third round as well, with Flower City Union chosen as the visiting side.

== Transfers ==
=== Transfers in ===
| Date | Position | No. | Name | From | Fee/notes | Ref. |
|---|---|---|---|---|---|---|
| December 13, 2022 | DF | — | (United States) Thomas Williamson | (United States) Minnesota United 2 | Free | |
| December 15, 2022 | DF | — | (United States) Daniel Chica | (United States) George Mason Patriots | Free | |
| December 23, 2022 | MF | — | (Colombia) Juan Daniel Ramírez | (Spain) AD Alcorcón | Free | |
| January 10, 2023 | FW | — | (United States) Wesley Leggett | (United States) St. John's Red Storm | Free | |
| January 12, 2023 | FW | — | (Syria) Kalil ElMedkhar | (United States) FC Dallas | Free | |
| January 13, 2023 | DF | — | (United States) Koa Santos | (United States) Charlotte FC | Free | |
| January 14, 2023 | FW | — | (United States) Zach Ryan | (United States) New York Red Bulls | Free | |
| January 17, 2023 | DF | — | (Canada) Kwame Awuah | (United States) St. Louis City 2 | Free | |
| January 18, 2023 | DF | — | (France) Yanis Leerman | (United States) Pittsburgh Panthers | Free | |

=== Transfers out ===
| Date | Position | No. | Name | To | Fee/notes | Ref. |
|---|---|---|---|---|---|---|
| December 31, 2022 | DF | 3 | (United States) Jacob Greene | (United States) D.C. United | End of loan | |
| December 31, 2022 | DF | 6 | (Ivory Coast) Gaoussou Samaké | (United States) D.C. United | End of loan | |
| December 31, 2022 | MF | 14 | (El Salvador) Jeremy Garay | (United States) D.C. United | End of loan | |
| January 17, 2023 | DF | 4 | (United States) Carson Vom Steeg | (United States) Memphis 901 | Free | |

== Club ==
=== Roster ===
As of October 4, 2023

| No. | Pos. | Nation | Player |
|---|---|---|---|
| 1 | GK | USA | Dane Jacomen |
| 2 | DF | USA | Koa Santos |
| 3 | DF | USA | Jake Morris (on loan from Columbus Crew) |
| 4 | MF | USA | Aidan Rocha |
| 5 | DF | FRA | Yanis Leerman |
| 6 | DF | CAN | Kwame Awuah |
| 7 | MF | CIV | Abdoul Zanne (on loan from ASEC Mimosas) |
| 8 | MF | CIV | Abdoul Koanda |
| 9 | FW | USA | Tommy Williamson |
| 10 | MF | USA | Chris Hegardt (on loan from Charlotte FC) |
| 11 | MF | SLV | Jeremy Garay |
| 12 | DF | USA | Jacob Greene |
| 13 | DF | USA | Nelson Martinez |
| 14 | FW | USA | Wesley Leggett |
| 15 | MF | USA | Alex Nagy |
| 16 | DF | USA | Cole Turner |
| 17 | MF | USA | Juan Ramírez |
| 18 | DF | IRL | Harvey Neville (on loan from Inter Miami CF) |
| 19 | MF | CIV | Landry Houssou |
| 20 | DF | USA | Daniel Chica |
| 22 | MF | USA | Isaac Espinal |
| 23 | MF | USA | Kalil ElMedkhar |
| 27 | DF | USA | Bryce Washington |
| 28 | FW | USA | Zach Ryan |
| 30 | GK | FRA | Hugo Fauroux |
| 31 | DF | USA | Graham Jones |
| 32 | DF | USA | Dash Papez |
| 34 | MF | USA | Brian Chavez |
| 35 | DF | USA | Ethan Pendleton |
| 36 | DF | USA | Jace Clark |
| 37 | MF | USA | Ignacio Alem |
| 46 | FW | TRI | Xavier O'Neil |
| 53 | GK | USA | Drew Hartman |

Signed to first team contract with D.C. United.
D.C. United Academy player.

=== Staff ===
As of June 10, 2023

Executive
| Executive Business Officer | (United States) Doug Raftery |
| General Manager | (United States) Stewart Mairs |
| Assistant General Manager | (Haiti) Clarens Cheridieu |
Technical staff
| Head Coach | (United States) Ryan Martin |
| Assistant Coach | (The Gambia) Mattar M'Boge |
| Assistant Coach | (United States) Garland "GR" Cannon |
| Goalkeeping Coach | (Poland) Jack Stefanowski |
| Head of Performance | (Australia) Claudio Altieri |
| Head Athletic Trainer | (United States) Teresse Rehwoldt |
| Equipment Manager | (United States) TJ Salzberg |

== Non-competitive ==
=== Preseason exhibitions ===
| February 11 | Richmond Kickers | 1–1 | Loudoun United | Midlothian, VA |
| 1:00 p.m. EDT | Gomiero 62' | Report | Williamson 54' | Stadium: River City Sportsplex; Attendance: 100 |

| February 19 | Loudoun United | 2–1 | New York Red Bulls II |
| 1:00 p.m. EDT | | Report |

=== Midseason exhibitions ===
| August 5 | Loudoun United | 2–4 | Ethiopia | Leesburg, Virginia |
| 1:00 p.m. EDT | Goal | Report | Dagnachew 30'; Bekele 54'; Tamene 63' (pen.); Endeshaw 76' | Stadium: Segra Field |

== Competitive ==
=== USL Championship ===
==== Standings ====
| Pos | Team | Pld | W | L | T | GF | GA | GD | Pts | Qualification |
|---|---|---|---|---|---|---|---|---|---|---|
| 8 | Detroit City FC | 34 | 11 | 15 | 8 | 30 | 39 | −9 | 41 | Playoffs |
| 9 | Miami FC | 34 | 11 | 15 | 8 | 43 | 44 | −1 | 41 | |
| 10 | FC Tulsa | 34 | 10 | 15 | 9 | 43 | 55 | −12 | 39 | |
| 11 | Loudoun United FC | 34 | 7 | 23 | 4 | 36 | 61 | −25 | 25 | |
| 12 | Hartford Athletic | 34 | 4 | 24 | 6 | 40 | 79 | −39 | 18 | |

Source: USL Championship Standings
Rules for classification: 1) head-to-head points; 2) head-to-head goal differential; 3) points-per game within conference; 4) total wins; 5) total goal differential; 6) total goals scored; 7) points earned against top four Conference finishers; 8) disciplinary points; 9) coin toss or drawing of lots

==== Match results ====
| March 11 1 | Memphis 901 | 1–3 | Loudoun United | Memphis, TN |
| 5:00 pm EST | Kissiedou 37', (red card) 63'; Ward (yellow card) 41'; Nascimento (yellow card) 47'; Smith (yellow card) 71' | Report | Williamson 8' (yellow card) 27'; Ryan 11', 90+4'; Armenakas (yellow card) 49'; Houssou (yellow card) 63' | Stadium: AutoZone Park; Attendance: 4,001; Referee: Eric Tattersall |

| March 19 2 | Loudoun United | 1–1 | San Antonio FC | Leesburg, VA |
| 4:00 pm EDT | Ryan 35', (red card) 90+1'; Turner (yellow card) 53' | Report | Bailone 55' | Stadium: Segra Field; Attendance: 3,411; Referee: Joshua Encarnación |

| March 25 3 | FC Tulsa | 3–0 | Loudoun United | Tulsa, OK |
| 8:30 pm EDT | Dyer (yellow card) 28'; Ferri 45+1'; Yosef 46'; Corrales (yellow card) 53'; Bourgeois (yellow card) 90+3'; Epps 90+5' | Report | Turner (yellow card) 29'; Williamson (yellow card) 36' | Stadium: ONEOK Field; Attendance: 4,565; Referee: Matthew Corrigan |

| April 1 4 | Loudoun United | 0–1 | Colorado Springs Switchbacks | Leesburg, VA |
| 4:00 pm EDT | Samaké (yellow card) 44' | Report | Williams 5'; Herrera (yellow card) 19' | Stadium: Segra Field; Attendance: 2,379; Referee: Jeremy Scheer |

| April 15 5 | Loudoun United | 3–0 | Birmingham Legion | Leesburg, VA |
| 6:00 pm EDT | Leggett 32'; ElMedkhar 42'; Houssou (yellow card) 50'; Ryan 69', (yellow card) 90+4'; Rocha (yellow card) 81' | Report | Rufe (yellow card) 54' | Stadium: Segra Field; Attendance: 2,505; Referee: Luis Arroyo |

| April 23 6 | Loudoun United | 2–0 | Oakland Roots | Leesburg, VA |
| 4:00 pm EDT | Ryan 30' (pen.); Armenakas 58'; Williamson (yellow card) 60'; Leerman (yellow card) 64'; Zanne (yellow card) 90+1' | Report | Tamacas (yellow card) 27'; Morad (yellow card) 29'; Mfeka (yellow card) 39'; Reid (yellow card) 75'; Kohler (yellow card) 75'; Murray (yellow card) 90+1' | Stadium: Segra Field; Attendance: 2,061; Referee: Cristian Campo Hernández |

| April 29 7 | Phoenix Rising | 3–1 | Loudoun United | Phoenix, AZ |
| TBD EDT | | Report | | Stadium: Rising Soccer Stadium; Attendance: 7,334 |

| May 6 8 | Loudoun United | 1–2 | Indy Eleven | Leesburg, VA |
| TBD EDT | | | | Stadium: Segra Field; Attendance: 2,214 |

| May 13 9 | El Paso Locomotive | 1–0 | Loudoun United | El Paso, TX |
| TBD EDT | | | | Stadium: Southwest University Park; Attendance: 6,723 |

| May 17 10 | Loudoun United | 1–3 | New Mexico United | Leesburg, VA |
| TBD EDT | | | | Stadium: Segra Field; Attendance: 1,527 |

| May 20 11 | Hartford Athletic | 2–0 | Loudoun United | Hartford, CT |
| TBD EDT | | | | Stadium: Trinity Health Stadium |

| May 28 12 | Loudoun United | 0–1 | Pittsburgh Riverhounds | Leesburg, VA |
| TBD EDT | | | | Stadium: Segra Field; Attendance: 2,880 |

| June 3 13 | Monterey Bay FC | 4–1 | Loudoun United | Seaside, CA |
| TBD EDT | | | | Stadium: Cardinale Stadium; Attendance: 3,054 |

| June 9 14 | Loudoun United | 3–1 | FC Tulsa | Leesburg, VA |
| TBD EDT | | | | Stadium: Segra Field; Referee: 4,007 |

| June 17 15 | Miami FC | 1–2 | Loudoun United | Miami, FL |
| TBD EDT | | | | Stadium: Riccardo Silva Stadium; Attendance: 1,357 |

| June 21 16 | Birmingham Legion | 2–0 | Loudoun United | Birmingham, AL |
| TBD EDT | | | | Stadium: Protective Stadium; Attendance: 4,572 |

| June 24 17 | Loudoun United | 2–4 | Tampa Bay Rowdies | Leesburg, VA |
| TBD EDT | | | | Stadium: Segra Field; Attendance: 2,189 |

| June 30 18 | Charleston Battery | 3–0 | Loudoun United |
| TBD EDT | | | | Attendance: 3,359 |

| July 3 19 | Loudoun United | 2–1 | Hartford Athletic | Leesburg, VA |
| TBD EDT | | | | Stadium: Segra Field; Attendance: 3,907 |

| July 8 20 | Louisville City FC | 1–0 | Loudoun United | Louisville, KY |
| TBD EDT | | | | Stadium: Lynn Family Stadium; Attendance: 9,709 |

| July 12 21 | Detroit City FC | 1–1 | Loudoun United | Hamtramck, MI |
| TBD EDT | | | | Stadium: Keyworth Stadium; Attendance: 5,291 |

| July 15 22 | Loudoun United | 1–3 | Orange County SC | Leesburg, VA |
| TBD EDT | | | | Stadium: Segra Field; Attendance: 2,458 |

| July 29 23 | Loudoun United | 1–2 | Miami FC | Leesburg, VA |
| TBD EDT | | | | Stadium: Segra Field; Attendance: 1,992 |

| August 2 24 | Loudoun United | 0–0 | Memphis 901 FC | Leesburg, VA |
| 11:00 am EDT | | | | Stadium: Segra Field; Attendance: 2,416 |

| August 9 25 | San Diego Loyal | 2–1 | Loudoun United | San Diego, CA |
| 10:00 PM EDT | | | | Stadium: Torero Stadium; Attendance: 3,214; Referee: Brad Jensen |

| August 12 26 | Las Vegas Lights | 0–3 | Loudoun United | Las Vegas, NV |
| 9:30 PM EDT | | | | Stadium: Cashman Field; Attendance: 2,819; Referee: Lorenzo Hernandez |

| August 19 27 | Loudoun United | 1–3 | Sacramento Republic | Leesburg, VA |
| 7:30 PM EDT | | | | Stadium: Segra Field; Attendance: 2,665; Referee: Greg Dopka |

| August 26 28 | Indy Eleven | 2–1 | Loudoun United | Indianapolis, IN |
| 8:00 PM EDT | | | | Stadium: Michael A. Carroll Stadium; Attendance: 10,137; Referee: Brandon Stevis |

| September 9 29 | Pittsburgh Riverhounds | 3–1 | Loudoun United | Pittsburgh, PA |
| 7:00 PM EDT | | | | Stadium: Highmark Stadium; Attendance: 5,512; Referee: JC Griggs |

| September 16 30 | Loudoun United | 2–2 | Charleston Battery | Leesburg, VA |
| 7:00 PM EDT | | | | Stadium: Segra Field; Attendance: 3,017; Referee: Alex Billeter |

| September 23 31 | Loudoun United | 1–2 | Louisville City FC | Leesburg, VA |
| 7:00 PM EDT | | | | Stadium: Segra Field; Attendance: 1,271; Referee: Kyle Johnston |

| September 30 32 | Tampa Bay Rowdies | 1–0 | Loudoun United | St. Petersburg, FL |
| 7:00 PM EDT | | | | Stadium: Al Lang Stadium; Attendance: 5,345; Referee: Jonathan Bilinski |

| October 7 33 | Loudoun United | 0–3 | Detroit City FC | Leesburg, VA |
| 7:00 PM EDT | | | | Stadium: Segra Field; Attendance: 4,389; Referee: Jeremy Scheer |

| October 14 34 | Rio Grande Valley FC | 2–1 | Loudoun United | Edinburg, TX |
| 9:00 PM EDT | | | | Stadium: H-E-B Park; Attendance: 4,843; Referee: Melvin Rivas |

=== U.S. Open Cup ===
==== Match results ====
| April 5 Second round | Loudoun United (USLC) (Virginia) | 2–1 (a.e.t.) | North Carolina FC (USL1) | Leesburg, VA |
| 7:00 pm EDT | Ryan 8'; ElMedkhar (yellow card) 72'; Leggett (yellow card) 86', (goal) 117'; Garay (yellow card) 120+1' | Report | Servania 68'; Lue Young (yellow card) 86'; Garcia (yellow card) 93'; Fernandes (yellow card) 120' | Stadium: Segra Field; Attendance: 2,779; Referee: Kenneth Rojas |

| April 26 Third round | Loudoun United (USLC) (Virginia) | 5–0 | (New York (state)) Flower City Union (NISA) | Leesburg, VA |
| 7:00 pm EDT | Williamson 6', 35'; Garay (yellow card) 20'; Ryan 39'; Zanne 49'; ElMedkhar 61'; Leggett (yellow card) 89' | Report | Calfo (yellow card) 12' | Stadium: Segra Field; Attendance: 250; Referee: Melvin Rivas |

| May 10 Round of 32 | Loudoun United (USLC) (Virginia) | 1–5 | (Ohio) Columbus Crew (MLS) | Leesburg, VA |
| 7:00 pm EDT | Samaké (red card) 10'; ElMedkhar 86' (pen.); Leggett (yellow card) 90+1' | Report | Yeboah 6'; Zawadzki 18'; Parente 24', 27'; Ramírez 36'; Morris (yellow card) 65' | Stadium: Segra Field; Attendance: 3,201; Referee: Luis Arroyo |

== Statistics ==
=== Top scorers ===
| Rank | Position | No. | Name | USLC | US Open Cup | Total |
|---|---|---|---|---|---|---|
| 1 | FW | 11 | (United States) Zach Ryan | 10 | 2 | 12 |
| 2 | MF | 23 | (United States) Kalil ElMedkhar | 8 | 2 | 10 |
| 3 | FW | 9 | (United States) Tommy Williamson | 5 | 2 | 7 |
| 4 | MF | 12 | (United States) Jackson Hopkins | 4 | 0 | 4 |
| 4 | FW | 14 | (United States) Wesley Leggett | 3 | 1 | 4 |
| 6 | 4 players with 1 goal | | | | | |
| Total | | | | 31 | 8 | 40 |

- Last updated: October 12, 2023
- Source: Team Stats

=== Top assists ===
| Rank | Position | No. | Name | USLC | USL Cup | Total |
| Total | | | | 0 | 0 | 0 |

- Last updated: October 26, 2022
- Source: Team Stats

=== Disciplinary record ===
| No. | Pos. | Player | USLC | | | USL Cup | | | Total | | |
| No. | Pos. | Player | Booked | (yellow card) (yellow-red card) | Sent off (straight red) | Booked | (yellow card) (yellow-red card) | Sent off (straight red) | Booked | (yellow card) (yellow-red card) | Sent off (straight red) |
| Total | | | 0 | 0 | 0 | 0 | 0 | 0 | 0 | 0 | 0 |

- Last updated: October 26, 2022
- Source: Team Stats

=== Clean sheets ===
| No. | Name | USLC | USL Cup | Total | Games |

== See also ==
- 2023 D.C. United season
