= Matai Akinmboni =

American soccer player (born 2006)

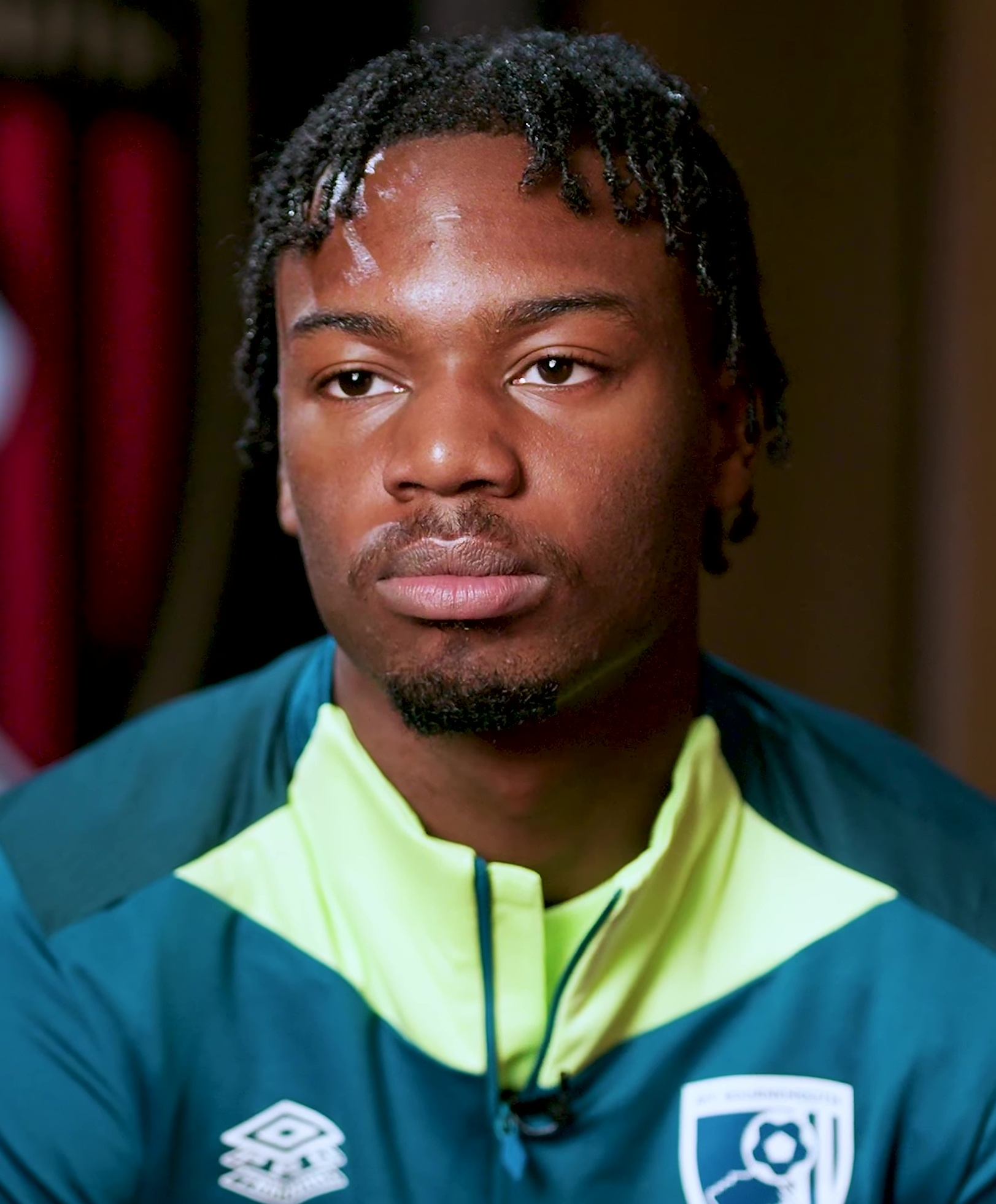
- Akinmboni with Bournemouth in 2025

Personal information
- Full name: Matai Eyitayo Akinmboni
- Date of birth: October 17, 2006 (age 20)
- Place of birth: Upper Marlboro, Maryland, United States
- Height: 6 ft 3 in (1.91 m)
- Position: Defender

Team information
- Current team: Dundee (on loan from Bournemouth)
- Number: 6

Youth career
- 2021–2022: D.C. United

Senior career*
Years	Team	Apps	(Gls)
2022–2024	Loudoun United	13	(0)
2022–2024	D.C. United	13	(0)
2025–	Bournemouth	0	(0)
2026–	→ Dundee (loan)	1	(0)

International career^{‡}
2024–	United States U19	3	(0)
2025–	United States U20	7	(0)
- * Club domestic league appearances and goals as of October 28, 2026 ‡ National team caps and goals as of October 11, 2025

Matai Eyitayo Akinmboni (born October 17, 2006) is an American professional soccer player who plays as a defender for Scottish Premiership club Dundee, on loan from Premier League club Bournemouth.

== Club career ==
Akinmboni is a central defender who started his career with D.C. United's USL affiliate Loudoun United while training at the D.C. United Academy. His first professional appearance was on March 27, 2022, coming on as a substitute in the last four minutes of a Loudoun match against The Miami FC. Akinmboni trained for two weeks with the German football club Bayern Munich in 2021, and was reported to have received "contractual terms" from the club, but ultimately did not join the team.

On August 31, 2022, Akinmboni was signed by D.C. United to a homegrown contract, which allowed him to join the first team. On the same day, he was featured as part of the team's gameday roster against NYCFC, but ultimately was not called to take the field for that game. Akinmboni's first appearance with D.C. United would come on September 10, 2022, when he was given a starting spot and played the entire first half of a match against Real Salt Lake that ended in a 0–0 draw.

=== Bournemouth ===
On January 3, 2025, Akinmboni signed for Premier League side Bournemouth on a long-term contract.

==== Dundee (loan) ====
On 27 August 2026, after trialling with the club for two weeks, Akinmboni joined Scottish Premiership club Dundee on a season-long loan deal. On 28 October, Akinmboni made his debut off the bench for the Dark Blues in a home league victory over Kilmarnock.

== International career ==
Akinmboni was born in the United States, but through his parentage, is also eligible to play for the senior teams of Nigeria or Ghana. On August 16, 2022, he was called up to the United States men's national under-17 soccer team for their training camp.

== Personal life ==
Akinmboni is the nephew of retired Ghanaian player Sammy Kuffour, who played in the center back position, and was part of the Ghana national team and Bayern Munich.

== Career statistics ==
=== Club ===
As of match played October 28, 2026

Appearances and goals by club, season and competition
Club	Season	League			National cup (Note: Includes U.S. Open Cup)		League cup		Continental		Other		Total	
Club	Season	Division	Apps	Goals	Apps	Goals	Apps	Goals	Apps	Goals	Apps	Goals	Apps	Goals
Loudoun United	2022	USL	6	0	—		—		—		—		6	0
Loudoun United	2023	USL	5	0	—		—		—		—		5	0
Loudoun United	2024	USL	2	0	1	0	—		—		—		3	0
Loudoun United	Total		13	0	1	0	—		—		—		14	0
D.C. United	2022	MLS	2	0	—		—		—		—		2	0
D.C. United	2023	MLS	3	0	2	0	—		—		—		5	0
D.C. United	2024	MLS	8	0	—		—		—		2 (Note: Appearances in Leagues Cup)	0	10	0
D.C. United	Total		13	0	2	0	—		—		2	0	17	0
Bournemouth	2024–25	Premier League	0	0	0	0	—		—		—		0	0
Bournemouth	Total		0	0	0	0	—		—		—		0	0
Dundee (loan)	2026–27	Scottish Premiership	1	0	0	0	—		—		—		1	0
Career total			27	0	3	0	—		0	0	2	0	32	0
