= Gavin Turner =

American soccer player (born 2007)

Personal information
- Date of birth: January 5, 2007 (age 19)
- Place of birth: Fairfax, Virginia, U.S.
- Height: 5 ft 7 in (1.70 m)
- Position: Attacking midfielder

Team information
- Current team: D.C. United
- Number: 48

Youth career
- 2017–2025: D.C. United

Senior career*
Years	Team	Apps	(Gls)
2022	→ Loudoun United (loan)	8	(0)
2024	→ Loudoun United (loan)	8	(0)
2025–	D.C. United	4	(0)
2025	→ Chattanooga (loan)	12	(1)

International career
2022	United States U15	4	(1)
2022	United States U16	1	(0)
- * Club domestic league appearances and goals as of April 18, 2026

Gavin Turner (born January 5, 2007) is an American professional soccer player who currently plays as a midfielder for Major League Soccer club D.C. United.

== Early career ==
Turner played as a youth at D.C. United Academy while he was 10 years old.

== Club career ==
=== D.C. United ===
On February 21, 2025, Turner signed a contract to the professional club making the 21st homegrown player signing in club's history.

== Personal life ==
Turner is a Vietnamese American, born to an American father and a Vietnamese mother.

== Career statistics ==
=== Club ===
As of match played April 18, 2026

Appearances and goals by club, season and competition
Club	Season	League			National cup		Others		Total	
Club	Season	Division	Apps	Goals	Apps	Goals	Apps	Goals	Apps	Goals
D.C. United	2025	Major League Soccer	1	0	0	0	—		1	0
D.C. United	2026	Major League Soccer	3	0	1	0	—		4	0
D.C. United	Total		4	0	1	0	0	0	5	0
Loudoun United (loan)	2022	USL	8	0	—		—		8	0
Loudoun United (loan)	2024	USL	8	0	2	0	—		10	0
Loudoun United (loan)	Total		17	0	2	0	0	0	19	0
Chattanooga	2025	MLS Next Pro	12	1	0	0	1 (Note: Appearance in MLS Next Pro Playoffs)	0	13	1
Career total			31	1	3	0	1	0	33	1
