= Jace Clark =

American soccer player

Personal information
- Date of birth: July 18, 2005 (age 21)
- Place of birth: Baltimore, Maryland, United States
- Height: 5 ft 10 in (1.78 m)
- Position: Defender

Youth career
- 2014–2018: Baltimore Armour
- 2018–: D.C. United

Senior career*
Years	Team	Apps	(Gls)
2021–2023	Loudoun United	28	(1)
- * Club domestic league appearances and goals as of October 19, 2023

Jace Clark (born July 18, 2005) is an American soccer player who last played for Loudoun United FC in the USL Championship. Clark committed to playing college soccer for the University of Maryland, College Park in 2023.

== Career ==
Clark began his youth soccer career playing for Baltimore Armour before transferring into the D.C. United Academy in 2018. In 2021, he signed a development contract with D.C. United's reserve team, Loudoun United FC. He made his Loudoun debut on September 26, 2021, in a 1–6 loss against Miami FC, playing in the entire second half of the match. On October 3, 2021, Clark scored his first professional goal, in a 1–5 loss against the Charlotte Independence.

On November 29, 2021, Clark committed to playing collegiately for the Maryland Terrapins men's soccer program beginning in the fall of 2023.

== Statistics ==
=== Club ===
As of match played April 16, 2022

Appearances and goals by club, season and competition
Club	Season	League			Cup		Other		Total	
Club	Season	Division	Apps	Goals	Apps	Goals	Apps	Goals	Apps	Goals
Loudoun United	2021	USL Championship	9	1	—	—	—	—	9	1
Loudoun United	2022	USL Championship	1	0	—	—	—	—	1	0
Career total			10	1	—	—	—	—	10	1
