= Alexander Dexter =

American soccer player (born 1998)

Personal information
- Full name: Alexander Joshua Dexter
- Date of birth: November 3, 1998 (age 27)
- Place of birth: Brooklyn, New York, United States
- Height: 1.73 m (5 ft 8 in)
- Positions: Left winger; forward

Youth career
- –2017: FK Pirmasens

College career
Years	Team	Apps	(Gls)
2017–2021	Pittsburgh Panthers	92	(22)

Senior career*
Years	Team	Apps	(Gls)
2018–2019	Long Island Rough Riders	16	(5)
2022	Loudoun United	3	(1)
2022	Charleston Battery	10	(0)
- * Club domestic league appearances and goals as of October 16, 2022

Alexander Joshua Dexter (born November 3, 1998) is an American soccer player who currently plays as a left-winger.

== Early life ==
Dexter was born in Brooklyn, New York, but moved to Germany at a young age, attending Kaiserslautern High School. Whilst in Germany, Dexter played with the FK Pirmasens academy.

== College career ==
In 2017, Dexter returned to the United States to play college soccer at the University of Pittsburgh. In five years with the Panthers, including a truncated season in 2020 due to the COVID-19 pandemic, Dexter made 92 appearances, scoring 22 and goals and tallying 22 assists. He was named ACC All-Freshman Team in 2017 and All-ACC Third Team in 2020.

While at college, Dexter played in the USL PDL for two seasons in both 2018 and 2019, making 16 appearances for the Long Island Rough Riders, scoring five goals.

== Club career ==
=== Loudoun United ===
In May 2022, Dexter signed with USL Championship side Loudoun United, who he made three regular season appearances for, scoring one goal on May 28, 2022, against Charleston Battery.

=== Charleston Battery ===
On July 8, 2022, Dexter signed a short-term deal with Charleston Battery. On July 16, 2022, Dexter made his debut for Charleston during a 3–1 win against Hartford Athletic. On July 29, 2022, Charleston announced that they had extended Dexter's contract through the end of the 2022 season. Following the 2022 season, Dexter was released by Charleston.
