= D.C. United Academy =

Soccer team

- Full name: D.C. United Academy
- Founded: 2005
- Stadium: Segra Field
- League: MLS Next
- Website: www.dcunited.com/academy
Home colors	Away colors

The D.C. United Academy is the youth and development program for the Major League Soccer club D.C. United. The program consists of teams at four age levels: the under-23 and under-20 teams, as well as the Academy (U-17, U-16, and U-15).

The D.C. United Academy has been one of the most successful MLS academies. Many players have been signed directly from the Academy to the professional team, or have later played professionally. Notable players to have graduated from the D.C United Academy include Bill Hamid, who has been called up by the U.S. national team and who was the MLS 2014 Goalkeeper of the Year, and Andy Najar, who has been capped for Honduras and who was the MLS 2010 Rookie of the Year.

== History ==
The D.C. United Academy was created in 2005 in an effort to provide local talent an opportunity to have professional training. D.C. United was one of the first MLS clubs to develop its own academy. The D.C. United Academy gained some press in 2013 when D.C. United Academy graduate Michael Seaton made his league debut with D.C. United; Seaton was the first player to play an MLS game who was born after MLS began play in 1996. D.C. United decided in 2015, however, to reduce its outlays on its academy in part to help defray the expenses associated with the team's new soccer-specific stadium.

== Structure ==
D.C. United Academy Structure
Level	Type	League
Senior team	Professional	Major League Soccer
Reserve team	Professional	USL Championship
U-18	Academy	MLS Next
U-16	Academy	MLS Next
U-15	Academy	MLS Next
U-14	Academy	MLS Next

Like most Major League Soccer teams, United's academy features youth pre-academy teams that ascend to the ranks of the senior team on the professional level. Starting in 2016, United will field their reserve team in the second-division USL Championship. Beneath their reserve and senior squads is the under-23 side, whom play exhibition matches.

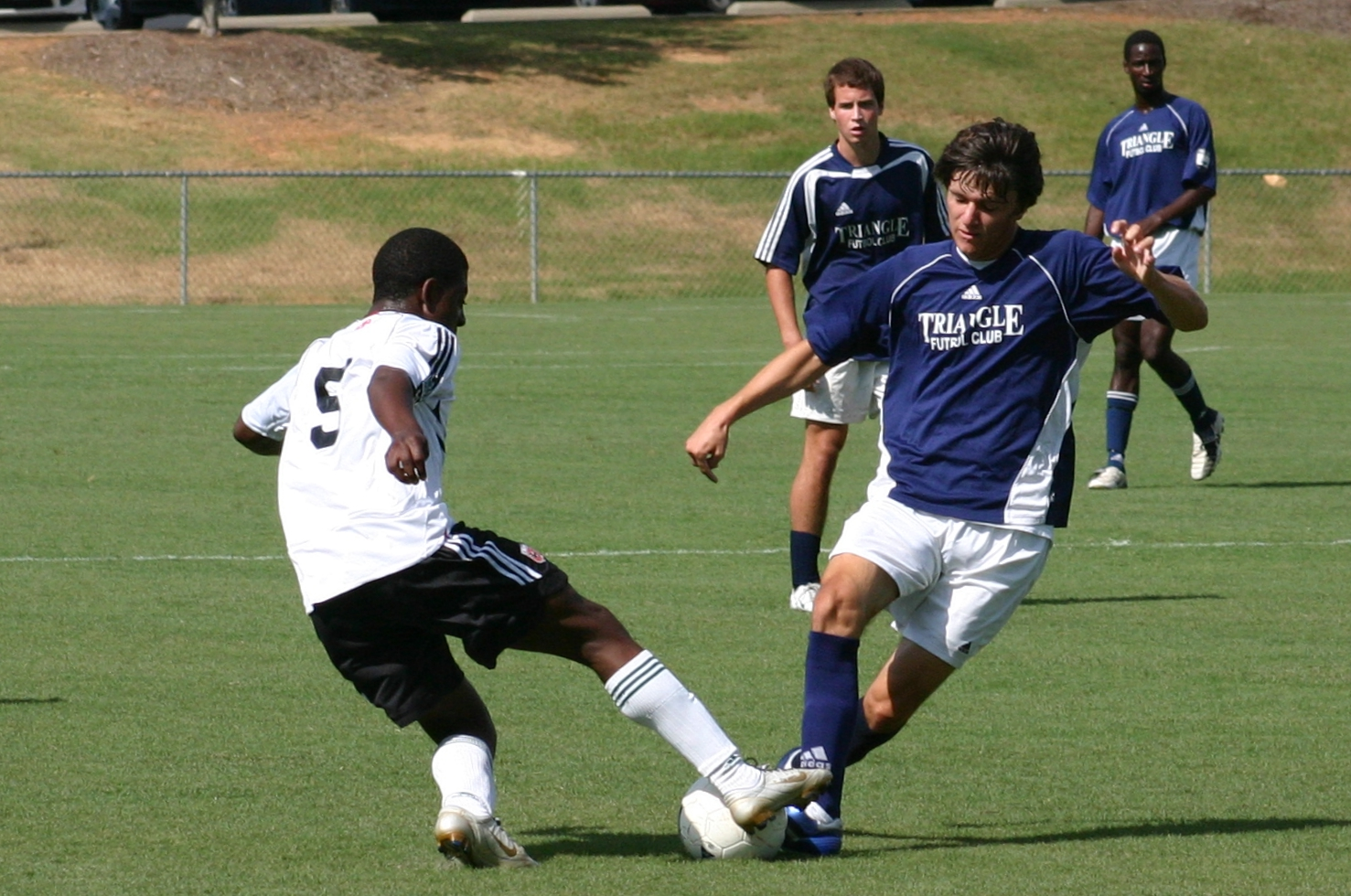
The U-16 team playing Triangle F.C. in the 2006 Super Y League semifinals.

The teenage brackets represent the main academy as well as the pre-academy structure. Players from the under-15 to the under-18 age level play in MLS Next, playing against other academy teams around the nation. Formerly, the academy played in the USSDA.

Consisting of players aged from under-12 to under-14, the Pre-Academy is a stepping stone for younger players to adapt to an academy setting. This age group of players participates in Northeast Pre-Academy League.

For players at the U-10 level and below, United offers specialty training camps.

D.C. United Academy is fully funded and does not charge any fees for its players.

== Notable alumni ==
Andy Najar, who transferred from D.C. United to Belgium's Anderlecht for a reported $2 million, was the first player from the D.C. United Academy — and first from any MLS academy — to move to Europe on a permanent contract. The youngest D.C. United Academy signing is Chris Durkin, who signed for D.C. United in 2016 at 16 years old. Furthermore, several D.C. United Academy players have played with U.S. national youth teams.

== MLS players ==
The following list includes players who, after leaving the D.C. United Academy, have played at least one match in Major League Soccer.

D.C. Academy prospects who played in MLS
Name	Turned Pro	DCU apps	Left DCU	Departure	National team (caps)
Bill Hamid	2009	240	—	—	United States (7)
Andy Najar	2010	100	2013	$3 million transfer to Anderlecht (Belgium).	Honduras (36)
Conor Shanosky	2010	5	2014	Released. Signed with Louisville City FC.	United States U20
Ethan White	2010	38	2013	Traded to Philadelphia for Jeff Parke.	United States U20
Michael Seaton	2013	5	2015	Traded to Portland.	Jamaica (14)
Collin Martin	2013	15	2016	Traded to Minnesota for 4th round draft pick.	United States U20
Jalen Robinson	2014	26	2019	Contract ended.	United States U23
Chris Durkin	2016	36	2020	$1.1 million transfer to Sint-Truiden (Belgium).	United States U23
Ian Harkes	2017	33	2018	Released. Signed with Dundee (Scotland).	United States U20
Antonio Bustamante	2019	2	2019	Released. Signed with Blooming (Bolivia).	Bolivia (2)
Donovan Pines	2019	93	2023	Signed with Barnsley F.C.	United States (2)
Griffin Yow	2019	36	2022	$100,000 transfer to K.V.C. Westerlo (Belgium)	United States (4)
Moses Nyeman	2019	32	2022	$350,000 transfer to S.K. Beveren (Belgium)	United States U20
Kevin Paredes	2020	41	2022	$7.35 million transfer to VfL Wolfsburg (Germany)	United States (4)
Jacob Greene	2021	16	2024	Signed with Columbus Crew 2	Trinidad and Tobago
Jeremy Garay	2021	3	2025	Out of contract, joined Loudoun United	El Salvador (2)
Ted Ku-DiPietro	2022	70	2025	Sold to Colorado Rapids	United States U23
Jackson Hopkins	2022	53			United States U20
Matai Akinmboni	2022	17	2025	Transfer to AFC Bournemouth	United States U20
Gavin Turner	2025	1			United States U16
Oscar Avilez	2026	0			United States U16
Grant Leveille	2026	0			Haiti

Notes:

- D.C. United appearances updated as of November 29, 2020.
- Where a player has played with multiple levels of a national team (e.g., men's team, under-20 team, under-18 team), only the highest level is listed.

Source: D.C. United

== The Academy ==
=== U19 team ===
As of November 1, 2024

Note: Flags indicate national team as defined under FIFA eligibility rules; some limited exceptions apply. Players may hold more than one non-FIFA nationality.

No.	Pos.	Nation	Player
1	GK	USA	Luke Peacock
2	DF	SLV	Diego Vásquez
3	DF	USA	Justin Melly
4	MF	USA	James Snaith
5	DF	USA	Dash Papez
6	DF	USA	William Jones
7	FW	LTU	Gabrielius Mažonas
8	MF	USA	Garry Zhang
9	FW	USA	Adrian Buri
10	FW	USA	Christopher Argueta
11	MF	HON	Brian Chavez
12	MF	ETH	Michael Dessalegn
13	DF	USA	Ramsey Ray
14	DF	HON	Alessandro Maldonado
15	DF	BRA	Henrique Borges

No.	Pos.	Nation	Player
16	MF	SLV	Felipe Rodriguez
17	FW	USA	Diego Diaz
18	GK	USA	Cameron Marbray
19	MF	GHA	Otu Bisong
20	FW	USA	Langston Fabiyi
21	FW	USA	Sydney Aggrey
22	MF	TUN	Teymour Mohammed
23	DF	USA	Judah Pritchett
24	GK	USA	Alexander Aguilar
25	MF	BUL	Glb Bogdanov
26	MF	TUR	Tito Segni
27	MF	USA	Nelson Martinez
28	FW	SLV	Brice Hall
29	FW	USA	Brown Huffard

=== U16/U17 Team ===
As of February 19, 2022

Note: Flags indicate national team as defined under FIFA eligibility rules; some limited exceptions apply. Players may hold more than one non-FIFA nationality.

No.	Pos.	Nation	Player
—	GK	USA	Jason Guevara
—	GK	USA	Luke Peacock
—	GK	USA	Ethan Talapatra
—	DF	SLV	Alexander Aguilar
—	DF	USA	Gleb Bogdanov
—	DF	USA	Gustavo Borges
—	DF	USA	Michael La Greca
—	DF	USA	Alexis Gonzales
—	DF	USA	Greg Jones
—	DF	USA	Dash Papez
—	DF	SLV	Diego Vasquez

No.	Pos.	Nation	Player
—	MF	SLV	Jonathan Aguirre
—	MF	SLV	Christopher Argueta
—	MF	USA	David Ayala
—	MF	USA	Isaiah Chisolm
—	MF	USA	Diego Diaz
—	MF	NCA	Luciano Lanzas
—	MF	USA	Nelson Hernandez
—	MF	HON	Alessandro Maldonado
—	MF	USA	Justin Melly
—	MF	USA	Ethan Pendleton
—	MF	USA	Gavin Turner
—	MF	USA	Gary Zhang

No.	Pos.	Nation	Player
—	FW	USA	Ignacio Alem
—	FW	USA	Sydney Aggrey
—	FW	USA	James Ashby
—	FW	HON	Noel Calix Ortiz
—	FW	PER	Gabriel Cossio
—	FW	USA	Wilson Holman
—	FW	USA	Gage Lyons
—	FW	TUN	Teymour Mohammed
—	FW	USA	Hugo Portillo

=== U15 Team ===
Note: Flags indicate national team as defined under FIFA eligibility rules; some limited exceptions apply. Players may hold more than one non-FIFA nationality.

No.	Pos.	Nation	Player
—	GK	USA	Jason Guevara
—	GK	USA	Owen Pschigoda
—	GK	USA	Cameron Marbray
—	DF	USA	Michael Bosley
—	DF	USA	Myles Mercer
—	DF	USA	Kemari Kerr
—	MF	USA	Ayaan Ali
—	MF	USA	Emidio Castro-Valdez
—	MF	USA	John Chisholm
—	MF	USA	Ejani Christian
—	MF	USA	Neil Das
—	MF	USA	Kevin Diaz-Blanco

No.	Pos.	Nation	Player
—	MF	USA	Braxton Hayes
—	MF	USA	Brice Hall
—	MF	USA	Jimmy Juarez
—	MF	USA	Jerry Lopez Felix
—	MF	USA	Ada Karatepe
—	MF	PER	Jason Molina
—	MF	USA	Damilola Olupona
—	MF	SLV	Diego Torres
—	MF	USA	Makai Wells
—	MF	USA	Aiden Zarate
—	FW	SLV	Raul Avalos
—	FW	USA	Langston Fabiyi
—	FW	USA	Haadi Khalid

No.	Pos.	Nation	Player
—		SLV	German Argueta
—		USA	Jerry Boasmanboon
—		USA	Julian Dix
—		USA	Alan Flores
—		GUA	Gabriel Fuentes
—		USA	Brown Huffard
—		POL	Jakub Porada

=== U14 Team ===
Note: Flags indicate national team as defined under FIFA eligibility rules; some limited exceptions apply. Players may hold more than one non-FIFA nationality.

No.	Pos.	Nation	Player
—		USA	Anthony Applewhaite
—		USA	Mayson Barillas
—		USA	Braydon Bloom
—		USA	Jeffrey Bonilla
—		USA	Austin Brown
—		DOM	Kamil Castillo
—		USA	Pascal Crosley
—		USA	Juani Cuneo
—		USA	MJ Day
—		USA	Nate Free

No.	Pos.	Nation	Player
—		USA	Chase Gould
—		USA	Luca Nicolacci
—		USA	Marco Nicolacci
—		USA	Edwin Ortiz
—		USA	Dominick Pell
—		USA	Mateo Pinto
—		USA	Valentino Quaranta
—		PUR	Edwin "SJ" Rios Jr.
—		USA	Austin Roberts
—		USA	Siji Sowemimo
—		USA	Brayden Stevens

== Coaching staff ==
As of January 7, 2026

Position	Staff
U-18 Head Coach	Declan Duffin
U-16 Head Coach	Nikola Katić
U-15 Head Coach	Daniel Szolosi
U-14 Head Coach	Robert Ivanovich Nunez

== Reserves ==
From 2005 until 2012, D.C. United fielded a reserve team that played in the MLS Reserve Division. The reserve team disbanded when Major League Soccer and USL Pro announced a player development partnership, and United announced Richmond Kickers as their USL Pro affiliate.

=== Honors ===
- MLS Reserve Division: 1
  - 2005

=== Seasons ===
Season	MLS Reserve League								Top goalscorer(s)	
Season	GP	W	T	L	GF	GA	Pts	Pos	Name	Goals
2005	12	8	0	4	26	21	24	1st	Jamil Walker	9
2006	12	6	1	5	22	11	19	5th		
2007	12	4	5	3	16	12	17	5th		
2008	12	5	1	4	19	21	16	5th		
2011	9	6	3	0	21	9	21	Eastern Division; 2nd	Joseph Ngwenya	4

== See also ==
- D.C. United
- D.C. United U-23
- D.C. United U-20
- U.S. Soccer Development Academy
