= Jackson Hopkins =

American soccer player (born 2004)

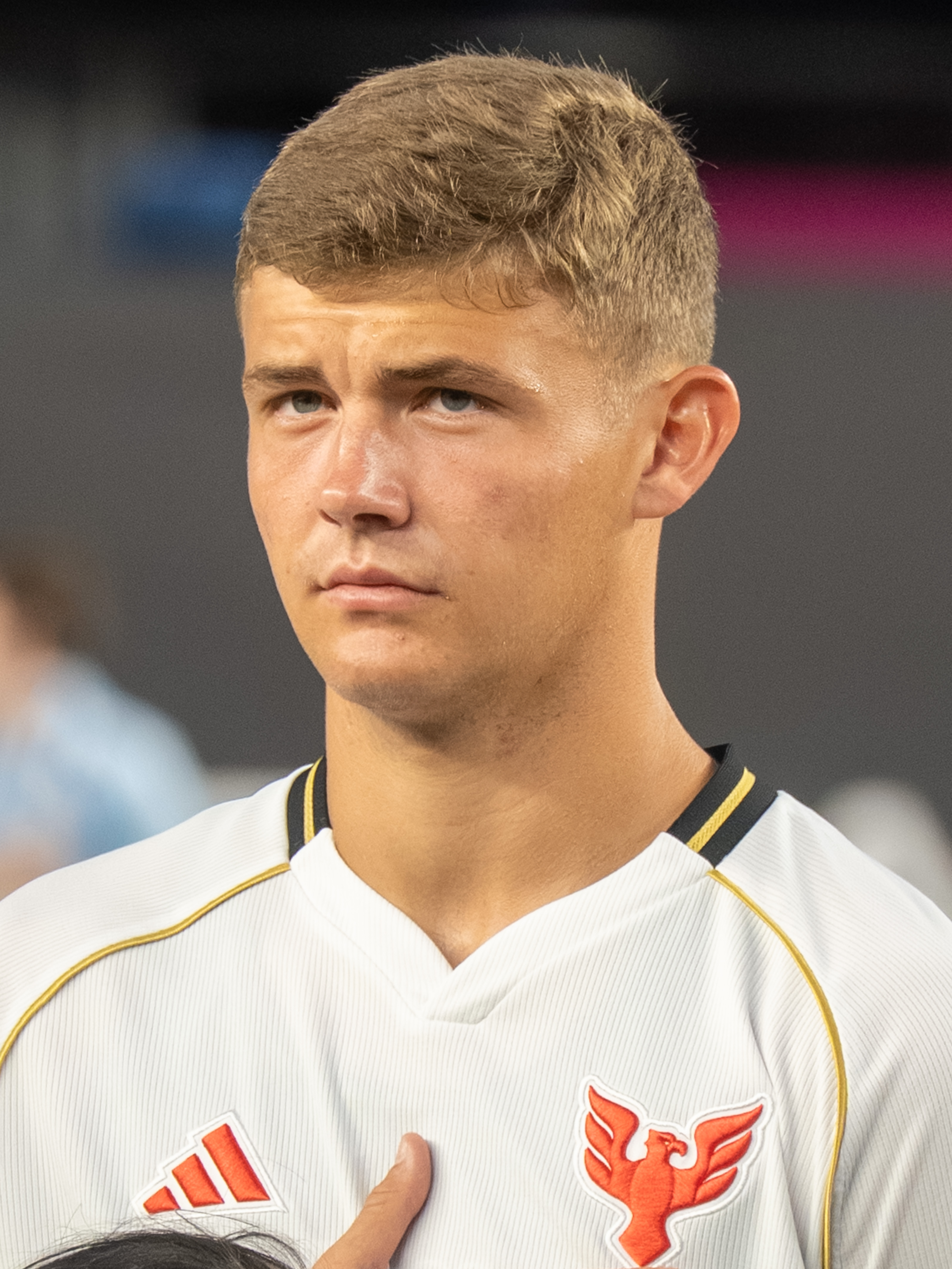
- Hopkins with DC United in 2025

Personal information
- Full name: Jackson Paul Lee Hopkins
- Date of birth: July 1, 2004 (age 22)
- Place of birth: Fredericksburg, Virginia, U.S.
- Height: 6 ft 2 in (1.88 m)
- Position: Midfielder

Team information
- Current team: D.C. United
- Number: 25

Youth career
- 2016–2019: Virginia Development Academy
- 2019: D.C. United
- 2020: New York Red Bulls
- 2021–2022: D.C. United

Senior career*
Years	Team	Apps	(Gls)
2021–2023	Loudoun United	33	(6)
2022–	D.C. United	93	(3)

International career^{‡}
2022	United States U20	6	(0)
2023–	United States U23	5	(0)
- * Club domestic league appearances and goals as of October 25, 2025 ‡ National team caps and goals as of September 24, 2022

Jackson Paul Lee Hopkins (born July 1, 2004) is an American professional soccer player who plays as a midfielder for Major League Soccer club D.C. United.

== Club career ==
Hopkins spent time with the Virginia Development Academy, before having spells with both the D.C. United and New York Red Bulls academy teams.

On July 27, 2021, Hopkins appeared for D.C. United's USL Championship affiliate side Loudoun United, coming on as an 82nd-minute substitute during a 3–5 loss to Charleston Battery.

On April 13, 2022, D.C. United signed Hopkins as the 18th homegrown player in club history.

== Career statistics ==
As of match played October 19, 2025

Appearances and goals by club, season and competition
Club	Season	League			National cup		Continental		Other		Total	
Club	Season	Division	Apps	Goals	Apps	Goals	Apps	Goals	Apps	Goals	Apps	Goals
Loudoun United	2021	USL Championship	16	2	—		—		—		16	2
Loudoun United	2022	USL Championship	5	0	—		—		—		5	0
Loudoun United	2023	USL Championship	12	4	—		—		—		12	4
Loudoun United	Total		33	6	—		—		—		33	6
D.C. United	2022	Major League Soccer	21	0	—		—		—		21	0
D.C. United	2023	Major League Soccer	7	0	2	0	—		3 (Note: Appearances in Leagues Cup)	0	12	0
D.C. United	2024	Major League Soccer	17	0	—		—		2	0	19	0
D.C. United	2025	Major League Soccer	17	3	2	1	—		—		19	4
D.C. United	Total		62	3	4	1	—		5	0	71	4
Career total			95	9	4	1	0	0	5	0	104	10

== Honors ==
United States U20

- CONCACAF U-20 Championship: 2022
