= Thomas Williamson (soccer) =

American soccer player (born 1999)

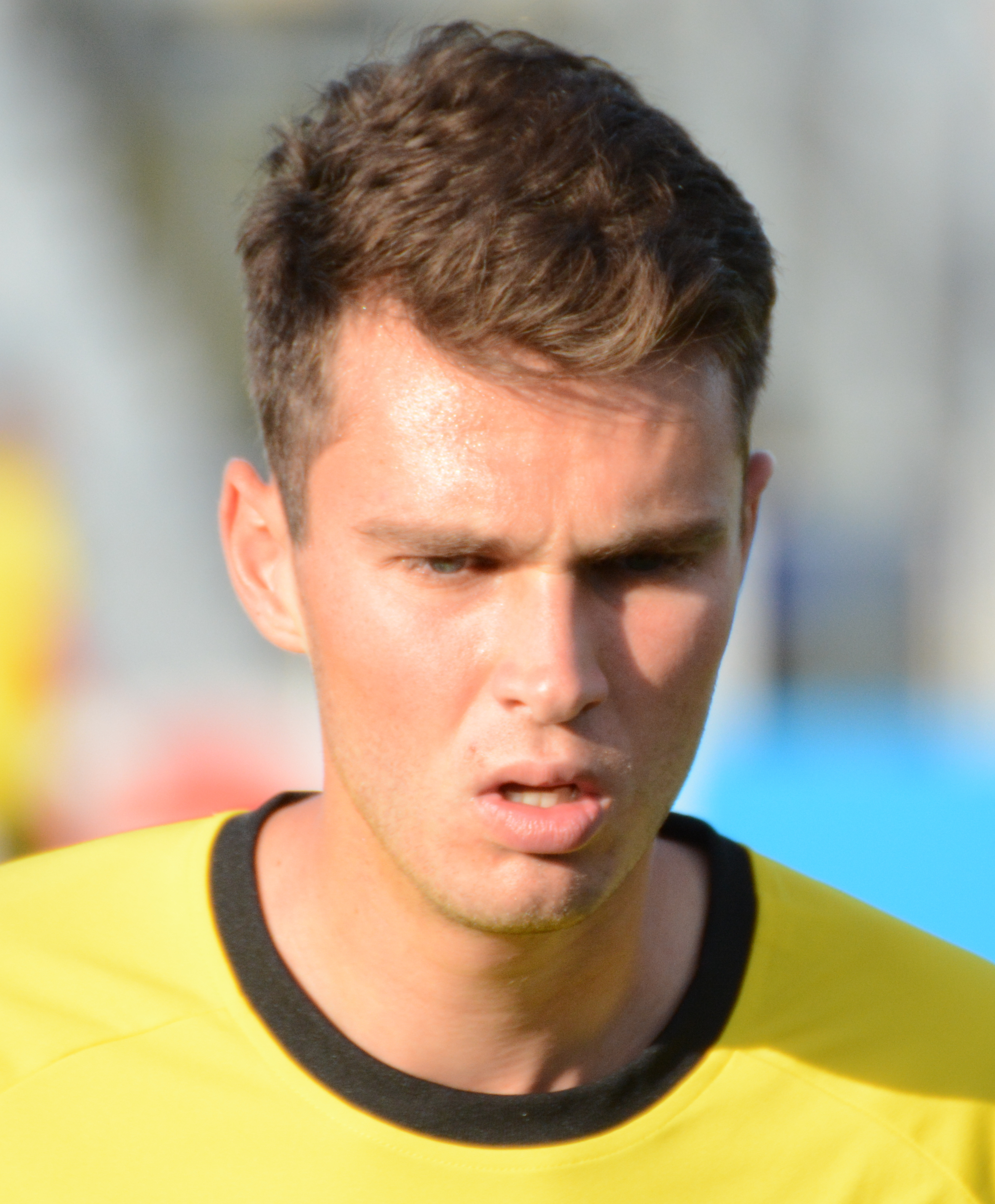
- Williamson with the Pittsburgh Riverhounds in 2021

Personal information
- Full name: Thomas Williamson
- Date of birth: May 5, 1999 (age 27)
- Place of birth: Anaheim Hills, California, United States
- Height: 1.85 m (6 ft 1 in)
- Position: Forward

Youth career
- 2013–2017: Strikers FC

College career
Years	Team	Apps	(Gls)
2017–2020	California Golden Bears	45	(9)

Senior career*
Years	Team	Apps	(Gls)
2018	Orange County SC U23	3	(2)
2021	San Jose Earthquakes	0	(0)
2021	→ Pittsburgh Riverhounds (loan)	27	(6)
2022	Minnesota United 2	21	(9)
2023–2024	Loudoun United	48	(7)
- * Club domestic league appearances and goals as of October 31, 2024

Thomas "Tommy" Williamson (born May 5, 1999) is an American former professional soccer player who played as a forward.

== Career ==
=== Youth ===
Williamson was born in Anaheim Hills, California. He played youth soccer as part of the USSDA academy team Strikers FC in Irvine, forgoing high school soccer at Villa Park High School. Williamson was in the top 10 in his division's scoring table during the 2015–16 season, scoring 18 goals in 34 games and tallying 12 assists. He graduated with a 4.3 GPA and accepted a scholarship to play soccer for the University of California, Berkeley.

=== College and amateur ===
In three full seasons with the Golden Bears, Williamson scored 9 goals and tallied 1 assist in 45 appearances, earning All PAC-12 Honors in 2019. Williamson was also selected as a Pac-12 All-Academic Honorable Mention in 2018. Williamson missed his senior season in 2020 due to the Pac-12 Conference being cancelled because of the COVID-19 pandemic. In 2021, he graduated with a B.A. in legal studies.

In 2018, Williamson appeared for USL PDL side Orange County SC U23.

=== Professional ===
On January 21, 2021, Williamson was drafted 12th overall in the 2021 MLS SuperDraft by the San Jose Earthquakes. On April 23, 2021, Williamson was officially signed by the Earthquakes. The same day, he was sent on a season-long loan to USL Championship side Pittsburgh Riverhounds.

Williamson made his professional debut on May 8, 2021, starting against Tampa Bay Rowdies, becoming the first player in Riverhounds history born after the club's formation. On June 15, 2021, he scored his first professional goal in a 1–0 away win against Indy Eleven. Williamson scored the first of two goals in a 2–0 win against Tampa Bay Rowdies, clinching a spot for the Riverhounds in the 2021 USL Championship Playoffs. He ended his rookie season with 6 goals and 4 assists.

Following the 2021 season, San Jose declined their contract option on Williamson.

On February 8, 2022, Williamson signed with the MLS Next Pro side, Minnesota United 2, ahead of their inaugural season.

On December 13, 2022, it was announced that Williamson would join USL Championship side Loudoun United for the 2023 season.
