= Nicky Downs =

American professional soccer player

Personal information
- Full name: Michael Newth Downs
- Date of birth: January 8, 1996 (age 30)
- Place of birth: Lakeville, Connecticut, United States
- Height: 6 ft 1 in (1.85 m)
- Position: Midfielder

College career
| Years | Team | Apps | (Gls) |
| 2015–2018 | Yale Bulldogs | 65 | (9) |

Senior career*
| Years | Team | Apps | (Gls) |
| 2018 | Black Rock FC | 12 | (0) |
| 2019–2020 | Hartford Athletic | 34 | (0) |
| 2021–2022 | Loudoun United | 64 | (1) |
- * Club domestic league appearances and goals as of October 19, 2022

Michael Newth "Nicky" Downs (born January 8, 1996) is an American professional soccer player who plays as a midfielder.

== Career ==
=== College and amateur ===
Downs spent four years playing college soccer at Yale University between 2015 and 2018, scoring 9 goals and tallying 15 assists in 65 appearances. While at Yale, he was a three-time All-Ivy selection, and was named to the United Soccer Coaches All-Northeast Region third team.

Downs played for USL PDL side Black Rock FC in 2018.

=== Professional ===
In January 2019, Downs joined USL Championship side Hartford Athletic ahead of their inaugural season. He was the very first player to sign with the team and was the first Yale alumni to sign with a US based professional soccer team since Ryan Raybould signed with the Kansas city Wizards in 2005.

On April 2, 2021, Downs signed with USL Championship side Loudoun United. On July 24, 2021, Downs scored his first professional goal.
