= Luis Zamudio =

American soccer player (born 1998)

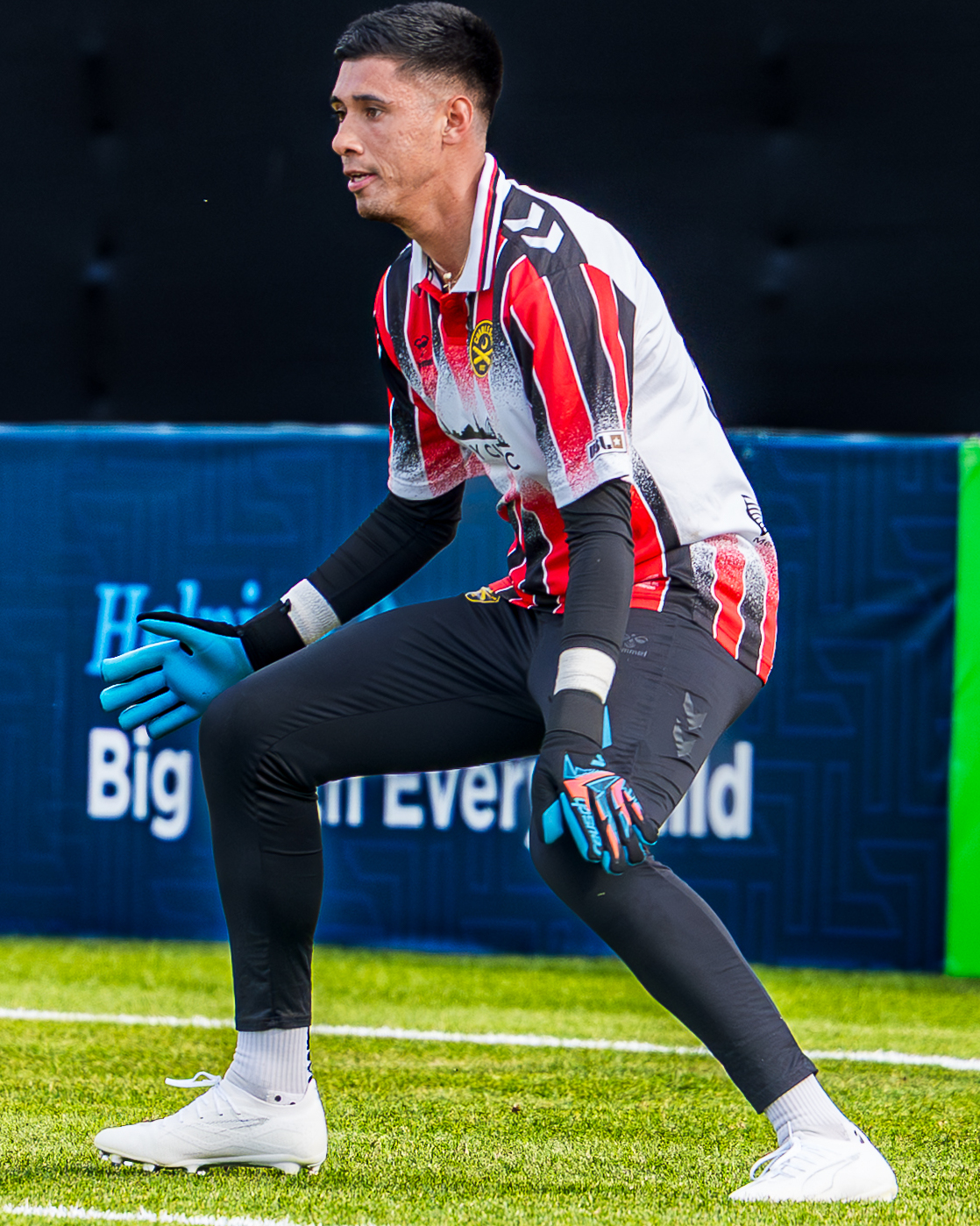
- Zamudio with the Charleston Battery in 2026

Personal information
- Full name: Luis Enrique Zamudio Lizardo Jr.
- Date of birth: June 24, 1998 (age 28)
- Place of birth: Las Vegas, Nevada, United States
- Height: 1.93 m (6 ft 4 in)
- Position: Goalkeeper

Team information
- Current team: Charleston Battery
- Number: 56

Senior career*
Years	Team	Apps	(Gls)
2016–2019	América Premier	6	(0)
2019	América	0	(0)
2020	North Texas SC	4	(0)
2021	Fort Lauderdale CF	9	(0)
2021	→ Miami FC (loan)	0	(0)
2022	Loudoun United	27	(0)
2023–2024	D.C. United	0	(0)
2023	→ Pittsburgh Riverhounds (loan)	5	(0)
2024	→ Colorado Springs Switchbacks (loan)	0	(0)
2025–	Charleston Battery	53	(0)
- * Club domestic league appearances and goals as of November 4, 2026 ‡ National team caps and goals as of October 31, 2021

Luis Enrique Zamudio Lizardo Jr. (born June 24, 1998) is an American professional soccer player who plays as a goalkeeper for USL Championship side Charleston Battery.

== Early life ==
Born in Las Vegas, Nevada, United States to Mexican parents, Zamudio holds double citizenship and is eligible to play for the United States or Mexico. Zamudio is a product of Sueño MLS, he participated in the 2015 MLS tryouts and reached the national finals after advancing from the Los Angeles leg.

== Club career ==
=== Club América ===
Zamudio has been registered with America's first team since 2019, and was the third-choice goalkeeper Guillermo Ochoa and Óscar Jiménez.

=== North Texas SC ===
On 7 February 2020, Zamudio joined USL League One side North Texas SC on a one-year contract with an option for the 2021 season. His contract option was declined by North Texas following their 2020 season.

=== Fort Lauderdale CF ===
In April 2021, Zamudio joined USL League One side Fort Lauderdale CF ahead of the 2021 season.

On July 7, 2021, Zamudio joined Miami FC on loan.

=== Loudoun United ===
Zamudio signed with USL Championship side Loudoun United ahead of their 2022 season. Zamudio was Loudoun's No. 1 goalkeeper in 2022, starting 27 matches and recording the league's second-second most saves, 105, along with seven shutouts.

=== D.C. United ===
On October 17, 2022, it was announced Zamudio would join MLS side D.C. United ahead of their 2023 season. On June 16, 2023, he joined USL Championship side Pittsburgh Riverhounds on a one-month loan. He picked up a clean sheet in his first match for the Riverhounds in a 0–0 draw against Oakland Roots SC. D.C. United declined his contract option following their 2024 season.

=== Charleston Battery ===
On January 22, 2025, Zamudio signed with the Charleston Battery of the USL Championship. Zamudio was Charleston's No. 1 goalkeeper in 2025, making 32 appearances across all competitions, and he ranked among the top of the league's goalkeepers for the season. Zamudio had the fifth-best save percentage (71%), tallied the seventh-most saves (71) and shutouts (eight) in the regular season and playoffs. His eight clean sheets set a new career best.

Zamudio's option was picked up by the club for the 2026 season.
