= Abdoul Zanne =

Ivorian footballer

Personal information
- Full name: Abdoul Moumouni Ousseni Zanne
- Date of birth: 18 February 2003 (age 23)
- Place of birth: Abidjan, Ivory Coast
- Height: 1.65 m (5 ft 5 in)
- Position: Midfielder

Team information
- Current team: SOA

Youth career
- ASEC Mimosas

Senior career*
Years	Team	Apps	(Gls)
2022–2025	ASEC Mimosas		
2022–2023	→ Loudoun United (loan)	54	(3)
2022	→ D.C. United (loan)	1	(0)
2024	→ North Texas SC (loan)	3	(0)
- * Club domestic league appearances and goals as of 7 April 2024

Abdoul Moumouni Ousseni Zanne (born 18 February 2003) is an Ivorian professional footballer who plays as a midfielder for SOA.

== Career ==
On 1 April 2022, Zanne signed on a season-long loan with USL Championship side Loudoun United from ASEC Mimosas, where he played with the club's reserve team. After playing with Loudoun, Zanne earned a short-term loan deal with Loudoun's Major League Soccer parent club D.C. United on 16 July 2022. He appeared for D.C. United on the same day, entering in the 87th–minute during a 2–0 loss away to Minnesota United.

Zanne joined Loudoun United on loan again on 7 March 2023.

Zanne joined North Texas SC on 23 December 2023 on a 1-year loan.

== Career statistics ==
=== Club ===
As of 7 April 2024

Club	Season	League			Cup		Continental		Other		Total	
Club	Season	Division	Apps	Goals	Apps	Goals	Apps	Goals	Apps	Goals	Apps	Goals
Loudoun United (loan)	2022	USL Championship	26	2	0	0	0	0	0	0	27	2
Loudoun United (loan)	2023	USL Championship	28	0	3	1	0	0	0	0	31	1
North Texas SC (loan)	2024	MLS Next Pro	3	0	0	0	0	0	0	0	3	0
Career total			57	2	3	1	0	0	0	0	61	3
