= Nanan Houssou =

Ivorian footballer (born 2000)

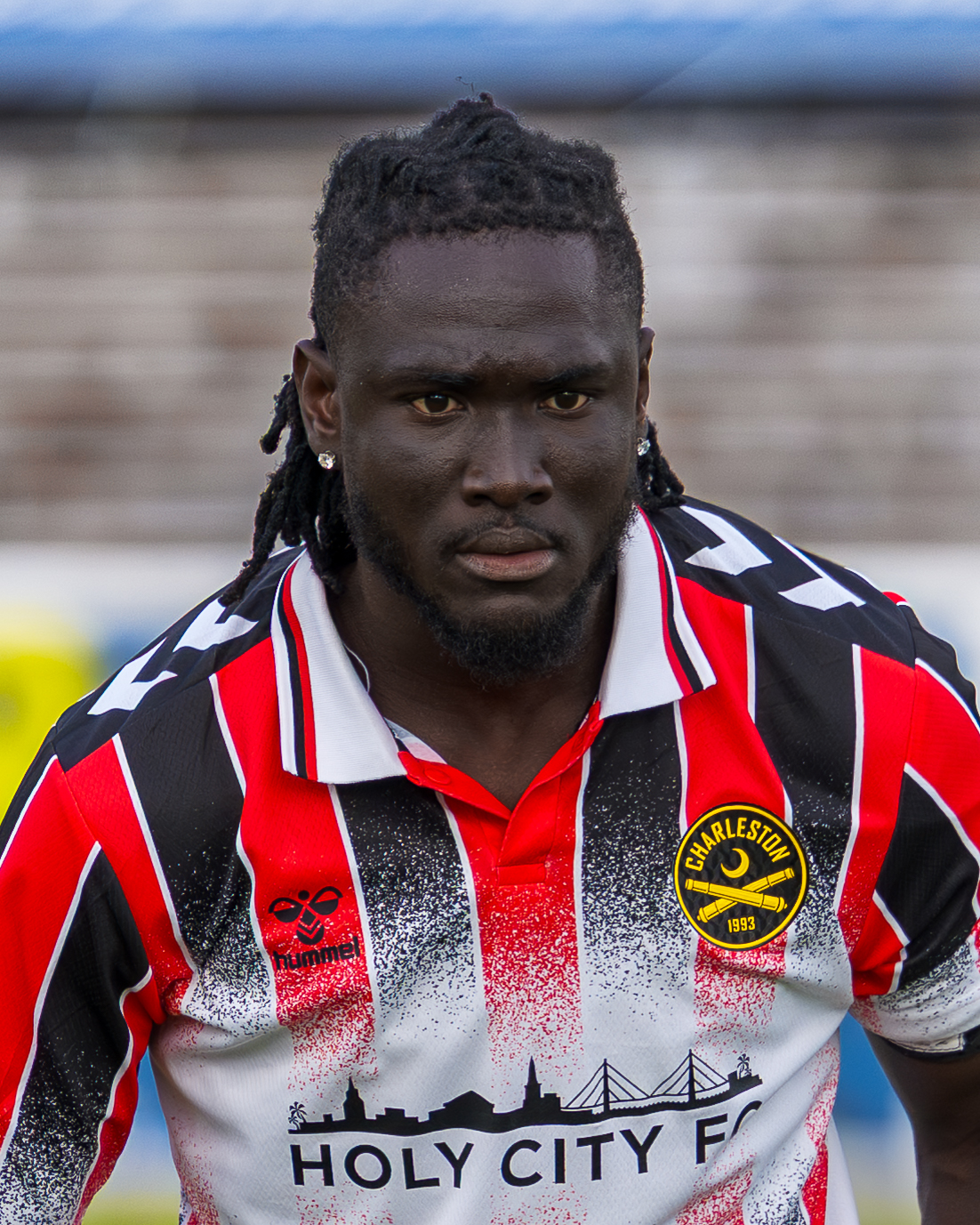
- Houssou with the Charleston Battery in 2026

Personal information
- Full name: Landry Nanan Houssou
- Date of birth: 28 December 2000 (age 25)
- Place of birth: Abidjan, Ivory Coast
- Height: 6 ft 3 in (1.91 m)
- Position: Midfielder

Team information
- Current team: Charleston Battery
- Number: 91

Senior career*
Years	Team	Apps	(Gls)
2019–2022	ASI D'Abengourou	20	(7)
2021	→ Loudoun United (loan)	22	(0)
2022–2023	Loudoun United	57	(1)
2024	New Mexico United	31	(1)
2025–	Charleston Battery	47	(4)

International career
- Ivory Coast U20
- * Club domestic league appearances and goals as of November 4, 2026

Landry Nanan Houssou (born 28 December 2000) is an Ivorian professional footballer who plays as a midfielder for Charleston Battery.

== Career ==
=== ASI D'Abengourou ===
Houssou scored seven goals and recorded 16 assists in 20 appearances for MTN Ligue 1 side ASI D'Abengourou in the 2019–20 season. On 19 February 2021, he moved to the United States on a loan deal with USL Championship side Loudoun United.

=== New Mexico United ===
On 23 February 2024 USL Championship side New Mexico United announced they had acquired Houssou via transfer from Loudoun United. He recorded his first goal for the club in a 2–1 win over San Antonio FC on 25 May 2024.

=== Charleston Battery ===
On 19 January 2025, Houssou made the move to USL Championship side Charleston Battery on a multi-year deal. His first goal with the club came in the 56th minute of a home match against Hartford Althletic on 3 May 2025.

== Career statistics ==
=== Club ===
As of 3 December 2024

Club	Season	League			Cup		Continental		Other		Total	
Club	Season	Division	Apps	Goals	Apps	Goals	Apps	Goals	Apps	Goals	Apps	Goals
Loudoun United (loan)	2021	USL Championship	22	0	0	0	0	0	0	0	22	0
Loudoun United	2022	USL Championship	30	0	0	0	0	0	0	0	30	0
DC United	2022	Major League Soccer	0	0	1	0	0	0	0	0	1	0
Loudoun United	2023	USL Championship	27	1	3	0	0	0	0	0	30	1
New Mexico United	2024	USL Championship	31	1	4	0	0	0	0	0	35	1
Career total			110	2	8	0	0	0	0	0	118	2
