= Jacob Greene =

Trinidadian footballer (born 2003)

Personal information
- Date of birth: March 23, 2003 (age 23)
- Place of birth: Crofton, Maryland, United States
- Height: 5 ft 10 in (1.78 m)
- Positions: Midfielder; defender

Team information
- Current team: Lexington SC
- Number: 2

Youth career
- 2015–2020: D.C. United

Senior career*
| Years | Team | Apps | (Gls) |
| 2019–2023 | Loudoun United | 73 | (3) |
| 2021–2023 | D.C. United | 11 | (1) |
| 2024 | Columbus Crew 2 | 22 | (2) |
| 2025– | Lexington SC | 46 | (1) |

International career
| 2021 | United States U20 | 2 | (0) |
| 2026– | Trinidad and Tobago | 1 | (0) |
- * Club domestic league appearances and goals as of October 31, 2026

Jacob Greene (born March 23, 2003) is a professional footballer who plays as a midfielder or defender for USL Championship club Lexington SC. Born in the United States, he plays for the Trinidad and Tobago national team.

== Club career ==
D.C. United signed Greene on November 25, 2020, making him the club's 15th homegrown signing. Greene made his MLS debut on March 19, 2023, in a 3–2 defeat against New York City FC.

== International career ==
In November 2021, Greene represented the United States national under-20 team at the Revelations Cup. He was called up to the Trinidad and Tobago national team for a set of friendlies in May 2026.

== Career statistics ==
=== Club ===
As of July 30, 2023

| Club | Season | League | | | National cup | | Continental | | Other | | Total | |
| Club | Season | Division | Apps | Goals | Apps | Goals | Apps | Goals | Apps | Goals | Apps | Goals |
|---|---|---|---|---|---|---|---|---|---|---|---|---|
| Loudoun United | 2019 | USL Championship | 7 | 0 | 0 | 0 | – | | 0 | 0 | 7 | 0 |
| Loudoun United | 2020 | USL Championship | 8 | 0 | 0 | 0 | – | | 0 | 0 | 8 | 0 |
| Loudoun United | 2021 | USL Championship | 24 | 1 | 0 | 0 | – | | 0 | 0 | 24 | 1 |
| Loudoun United | 2022 | USL Championship | 33 | 2 | 1 | 0 | – | | 0 | 0 | 34 | 2 |
| Loudoun United | Total | | 72 | 3 | 1 | 0 | — | | 0 | 0 | 73 | 3 |
| D.C. United | 2023 | Major League Soccer | 11 | 1 | 2 | 0 | — | | 2 (Note: Appearances in Leagues Cup) | 0 | 15 | 1 |
| Career total | | | 83 | 4 | 3 | 0 | 0 | 0 | 2 | 0 | 88 | 4 |
